= Lake Altaussee =

Lake in Austria

- Altausseersee
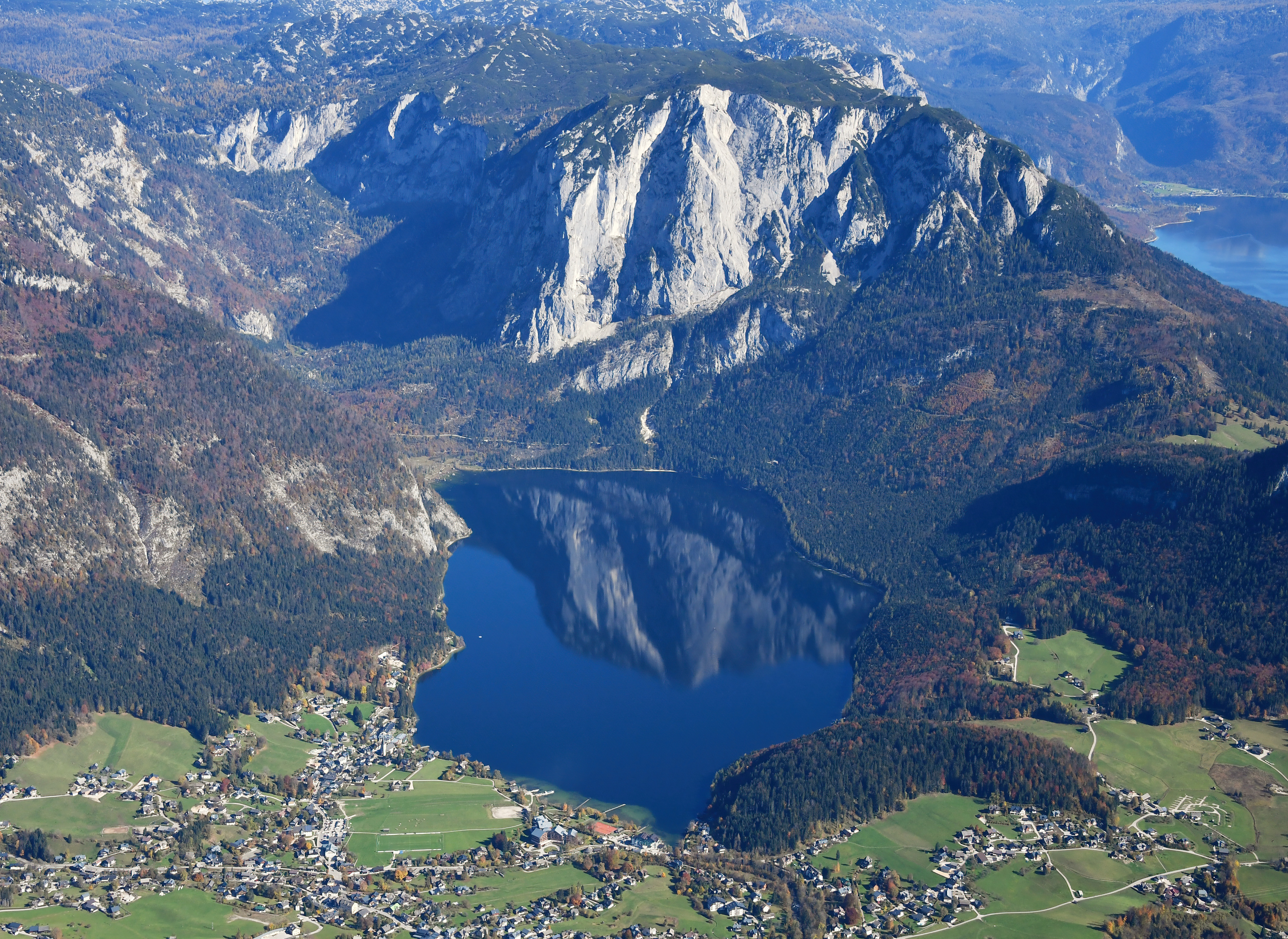
- Aerial view of the city of Altaussee with Lake Altaussee and Trisselwand

- Location within Austria
- Location: Styria, Austria
- Coordinates: 47°38′30″N 13°47′10″E
- Catchment area: 54 km^{2} (21 sq mi)
- Max. length: 2.6 km (1.6 mi)
- Max. width: 1 km (0.62 mi)
- Surface area: 2.1 km^{2} (0.81 sq mi)
- Average depth: 35 m (115 ft)
- Max. depth: 73 m (240 ft)
- Water volume: 72,700,000 m^{3} (58,900 acre⋅ft)
- Settlements: Altaussee

Lake Altaussee, also known as Altausseersee, is a mountain lake located at the southwestern foot of the Totes Gebirge in the Styrian part of the Salzkammergut. It lies at 712 m above sea level. The center of the municipality of Altaussee is located on the western shore. The Altaussee Traun, which flows into the Danube via the Traun, serves as the outlet of the lake. The largely undeveloped shores and adjacent wetlands of Lake Altaussee provide habitats for numerous animal and plant species and have been under nature conservation since 1959. The Austrian Federal Forests own Lake Altaussee, which is a popular excursion destination due to its beautiful location. Every third year, the lake hosts the Daffodil Festival, Austria's largest flower festival.

== Geography ==
The Totes Gebirge surround Lake Altaussee in a horseshoe shape. The Loser (1873m above sea level ) lies to the north, with steep flanks that drop sharply to the lakeshore. To the east, the Trisselwand (1754m sea level) features a rock face that rises approximately 600 meters high. On the northeastern shore, the Seewiese marks the beginning of a trough valley that leads over the Hochklapfsattel to the plateau of the Totes Gebirge. To the south, the Tressenstein (1201m above sea level) follows, while the village of Altaussee in the hilly area of the Aussee Basin is situated to the west. The shores are rocky and steep, particularly in the north, while in other areas, they are partly pebbly, flat and largely undeveloped.

The lake stretches from west-southwest to east-northeast, covering a length of 2.6 km with a maximum width of 1 km, and a surface area of around 2.1 km^{2}. With an average depth of 35 m, the lake basin has steep slopes, except for the northeastern part, where the slope gradually decreases from approximately 40m depth, leading to a relatively large bottom zone with a maximum depth of 53m. The deepest point is a spring funnel near the north bank, which reaches a depth of 73m, while the water volume measures 72.7 million cubic meters.

The lake can be reached via the Altausseerstraße L702. The lake is surrounded by a 7.4 km long circular hiking trail Uferpromenade.

== Hydrology ==
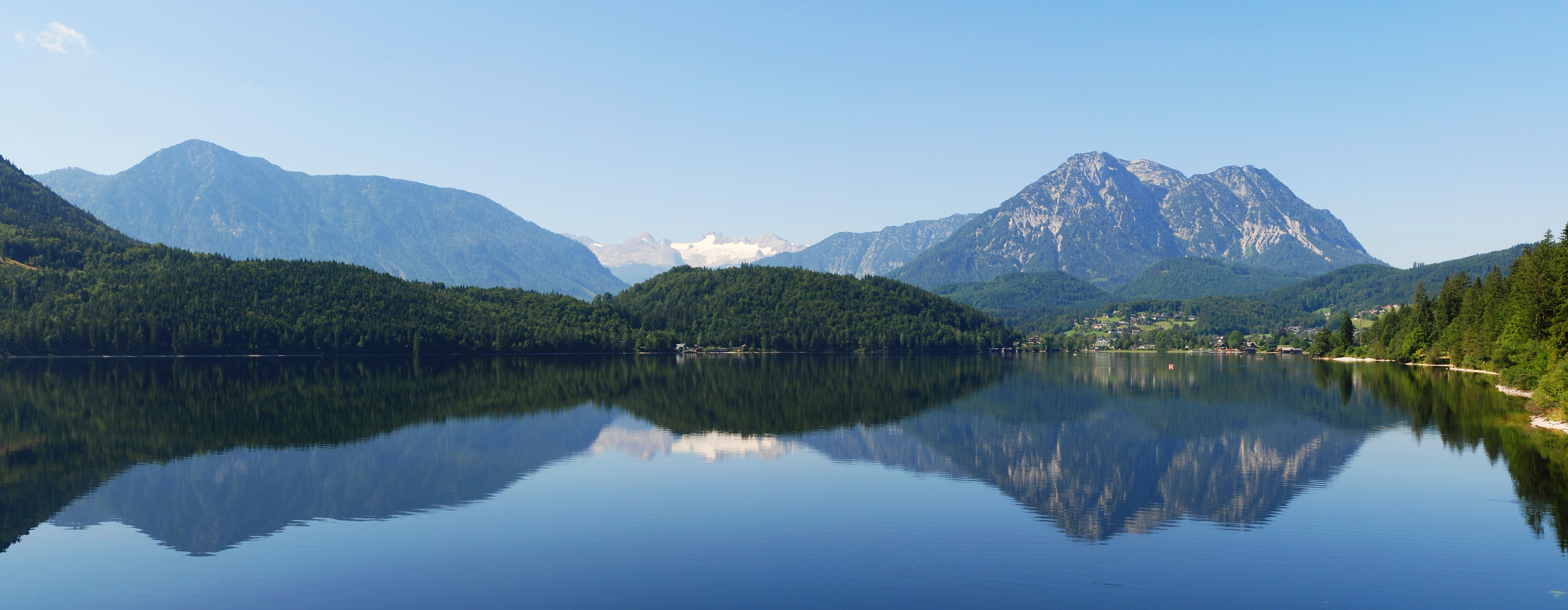
The nature reserve in Styria with the ID NSG 03 a.

The hydrological catchment area of Lake Altaussee encompasses a total area of 54 km^{2}, entirely located within the Totes Gebirge. The lake's primary source of water is from karst springs located at the lake's bottom, which receive underground flow from debris and rock crevices. These springs have an average total discharge of 3750 L/s. Additionally, there are a few small spring outlets along the shores with a combined discharge of approximately 20 L/s. Lake Altaussee demonstrates typical fluctuations in discharge commonly associated with karst springs. In the northeast, there is a small dead ice hole called Lake Osterseen, which is filled by groundwater corresponding to the water level of Lake Altaussee. The Altaussee Traun, the lake's outlet, exits in the southwest at the Seeklause, where a bridge spans the outflow. It carves its path between the rock barrier of the Plattenkogel and the alluvial fan of the Augstbach, which acts as a natural dam for the lake.

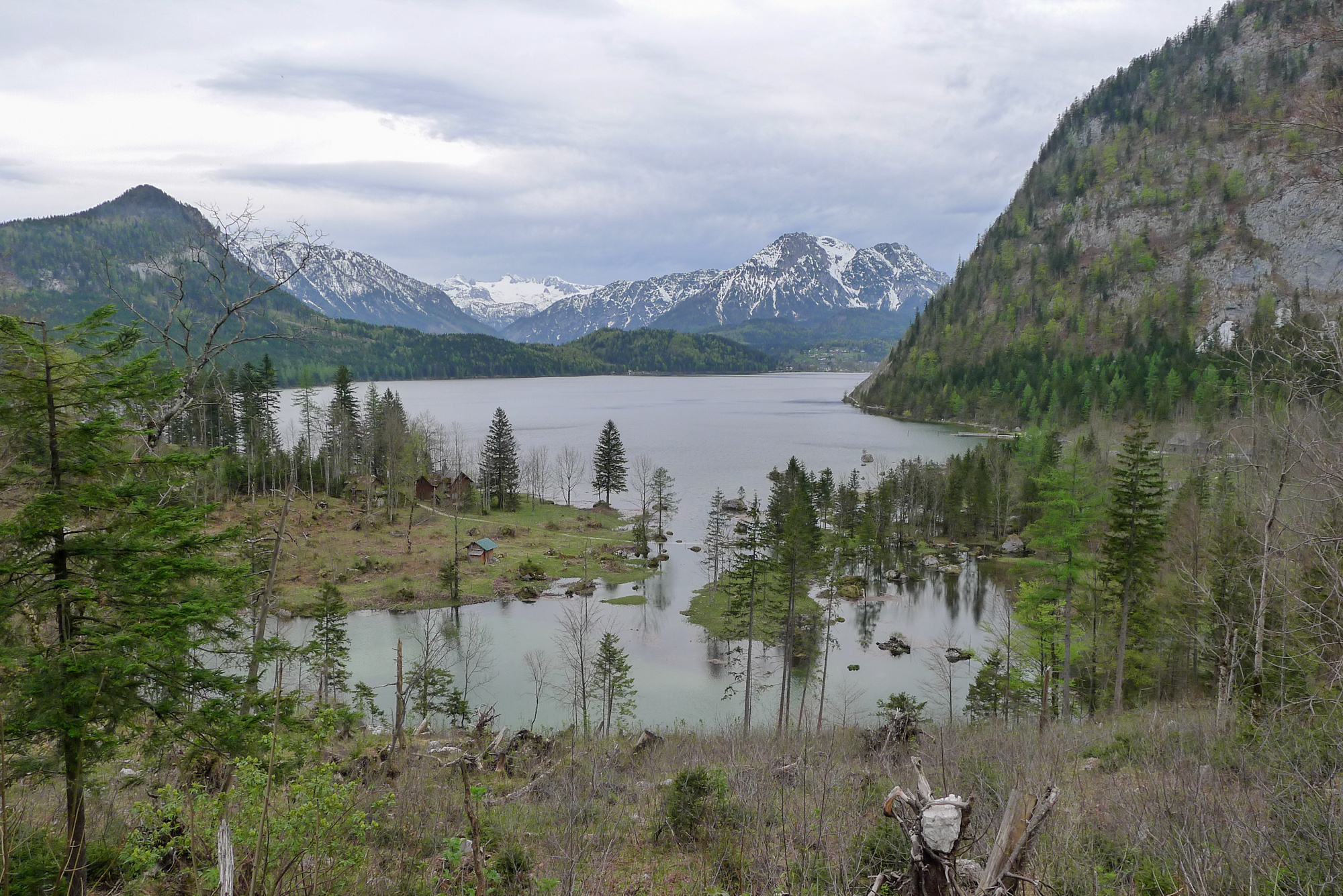
lake at high tide with a flooded lake meadow in April 2012

Originally, the Augstbach stream flowed into Lake Altaussee 250m north of the lake outlet. However, due to the issue of saline water from the nearby salt mine repeatedly reaching the lake through this stream, the stream bed was artificially relocated before 1530. Since then, the Augstbach has been redirected to flow westward, past Lake Altaussee, and into the Traun River approximately 150m downstream from the lake outlet.

After heavy and prolonged rainfalls, a hydrological karst phenomenon known as "the Liagern" can be witnessed in the Seewiese area. This event occurs due to the presence of two cave entrances situated at different elevations. During this spectacle, vast amounts of water accumulate within a cave in the middle section of the Loserwand. The resulting overpressure causes a large jet of water to shoot out of the cave portal of the Liager hole in a high arc. The process, with some interruptions, only takes about an hour, and the bulk quantities can reach 3000 L/s. The waterfall turns into a torrent in the area of the wall, which tumbles down to the lake and, together with the strong underground inflow, causes the lake level to rise by up to 60 cm within just 12 hours.

== Geology ==
=== Tectonic ===
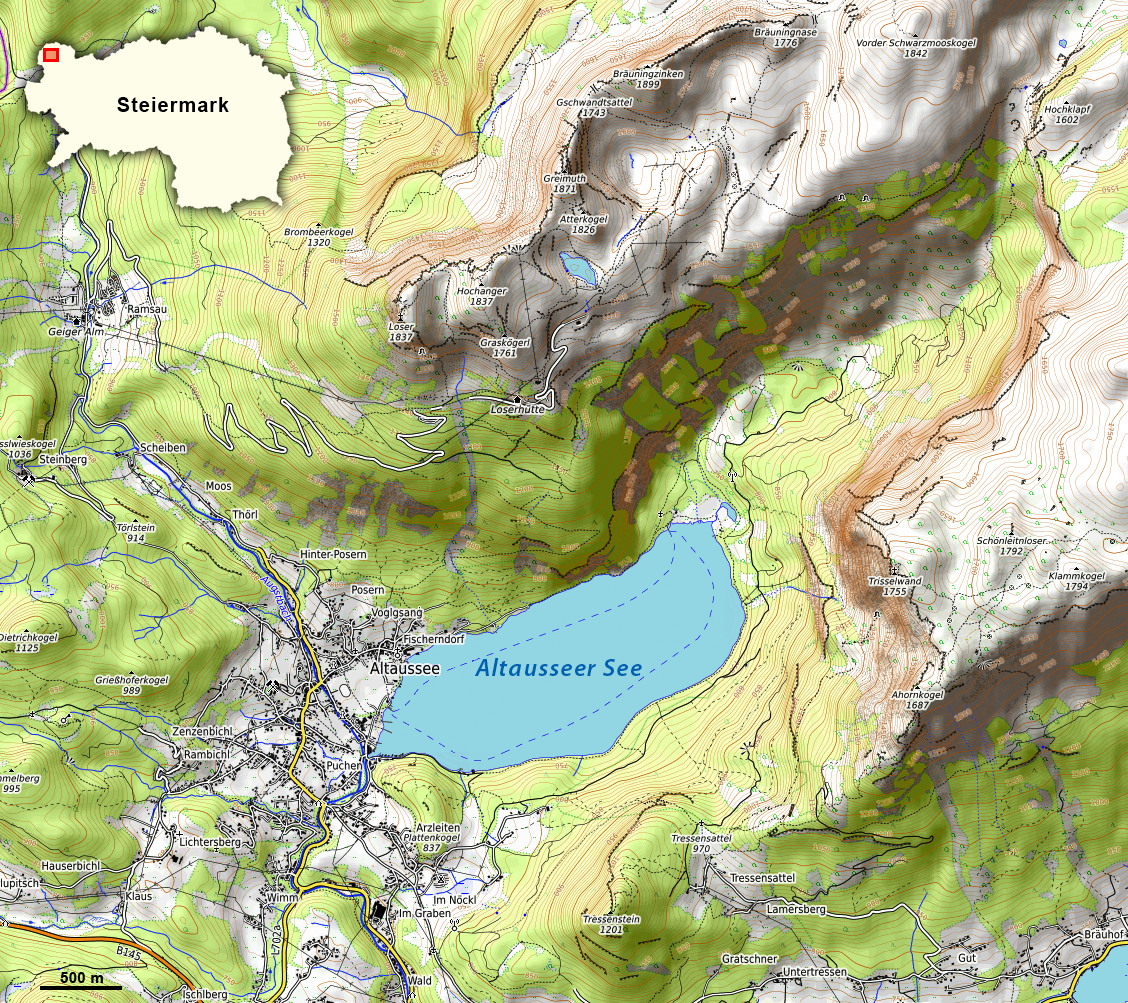
Topographic map of the Altaussee Lake.

Lake Altaussee is a component of the Northern Limestone Alps, which lies on the southwestern edge of the Totengebirge cover (Tirolic period), characterized by its abundance of Mesozoic limestones and dolomites from the Triassic and Jurassic periods. Within the western part of the Totes Gebirge, lies the Schönberg group, which is geologically distinct from the Priel group due to a deep incursion furrow. The Wildensee line is a geological structure that stretches from Lake Altaussee, traverses the Hochklapfsattel, extends to Wildensandee Lake, and continues over the Rinnerboden to Offensee Lake. The base of the Loser mountain is composed predominantly of Dachstein limestone, while the Plattenkogel showcases Pedata limestone or dolomite formations, both originating from the Triassic period. The Trisselwand and Tressenstein areas exhibit the presence of Oberalmer Formation and Tressensteinkalk, which formed during the Jurassic period. Scattered around the lake, one can observe remnants of terminal and lateral moraines, offering glimpses into the region's glacial history and the shaping of its surrounding landscape.

=== Former glaciation and formation ===
During the ice ages, the Altaussee glacier flowed from the Totes Gebirge plateau, flowing over the Aussee basin and reaching the Traun glacier near Bad Goisern. The glacier's movement was instrumental in sculpting the valley's over-deepened basin of Lake Altaussee. About 16,000 years ago, a powerful readvance of the glacier occurred and filled the basin once again, giving it its current form. Simultaneously, as the over-deepened basin was being freed from the ice, a lake began to form at the edge of the ice body. This phase, marked by the presence of a high debris formation around Lake Altaussee's basin, indicates the interaction between the ice body and the lake basin. As the ice eventually disappeared entirely, the alluvial cone adjusted to accommodate the present lake level. Originally, the lake area was likely more extensive, stretching over the Seewiese and reaching the Osterseen. Over the course of the post-glacial period, the lake basin constantly changed its shape as a result of silting up. It is expected that, over tens of thousands of years, the lake basin will eventually vanish once again, further transforming the landscape.

== Climate ==
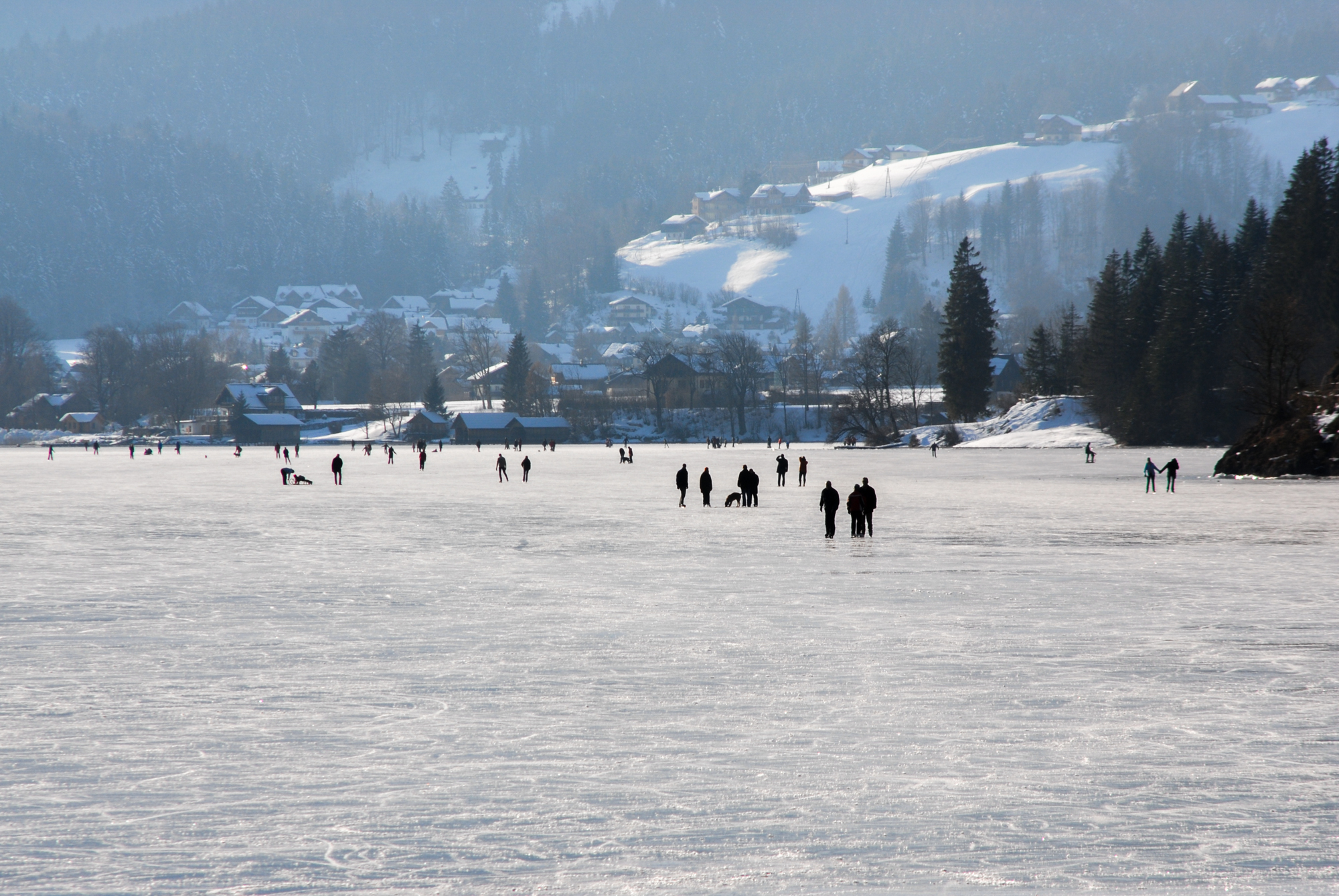
The lake often freezes over completely in winter, as here in December 2007.

The climate data show a temperature and precipitation distribution typically found in the Northern Limestone Alps: Cool and precipitation-rich summers, with a maximum of 16.2 °C and 220mm in July, respectively, and winters with low precipitation, with a minimum temperature of -2.2 °C in January. Precipitation shows a secondary maximum from December to January. Overall, the annual precipitation was 2041mm with an annual average temperature of 7.1 °C. The Schönberg group, located at the edge of the Totes Gebirge, benefits from frequent cloud accumulation, resulting in above-average precipitation in that area. A comparison with Bad Mitterndorf, situated on the southern side of the Totes Gebirge and approximately 12 km away, highlights the barrier effect of the Totes Gebirge at a similar altitude. Bad Mitterndorf receives annual precipitation of 1222mm at an elevation of 803m above sea level. In terms of snow cover duration, the nearby town of Bad Aussee, located 3 km away, experiences approximately 126 days of winter snow cover.

Climate data for Lake Altaussee (Salzbergwerk)
| Month | Jan | Feb | Mar | Apr | May | Jun | Jul | Aug | Sep | Oct | Nov | Dec | Year |
|---|---|---|---|---|---|---|---|---|---|---|---|---|---|
| Daily mean °C | −2.2 | −1.4 | 1.9 | 6.5 | 11.3 | 14.8 | 16.2 | 15.9 | 11.7 | 7.8 | 2.9 | −0.9 | 7.0 |
| Average precipitation mm | 194 | 147 | 173 | 102 | 191 | 202 | 220 | 193 | 185 | 148 | 119 | 167 | 2,041 |
| Daily mean °F | 28.0 | 29.5 | 35.4 | 43.7 | 52.3 | 58.6 | 61.2 | 60.6 | 53.1 | 46.0 | 37.2 | 30.4 | 44.7 |
| Average precipitation inches | 7.6 | 5.8 | 6.8 | 4.0 | 7.5 | 8.0 | 8.7 | 7.6 | 7.3 | 5.8 | 4.7 | 6.6 | 80.4 |
Source: Hydrographic Service Styria, Office of the Styrian Provincial Government, data from 1998 to 2019.

== Limnology ==
=== Circulation ===
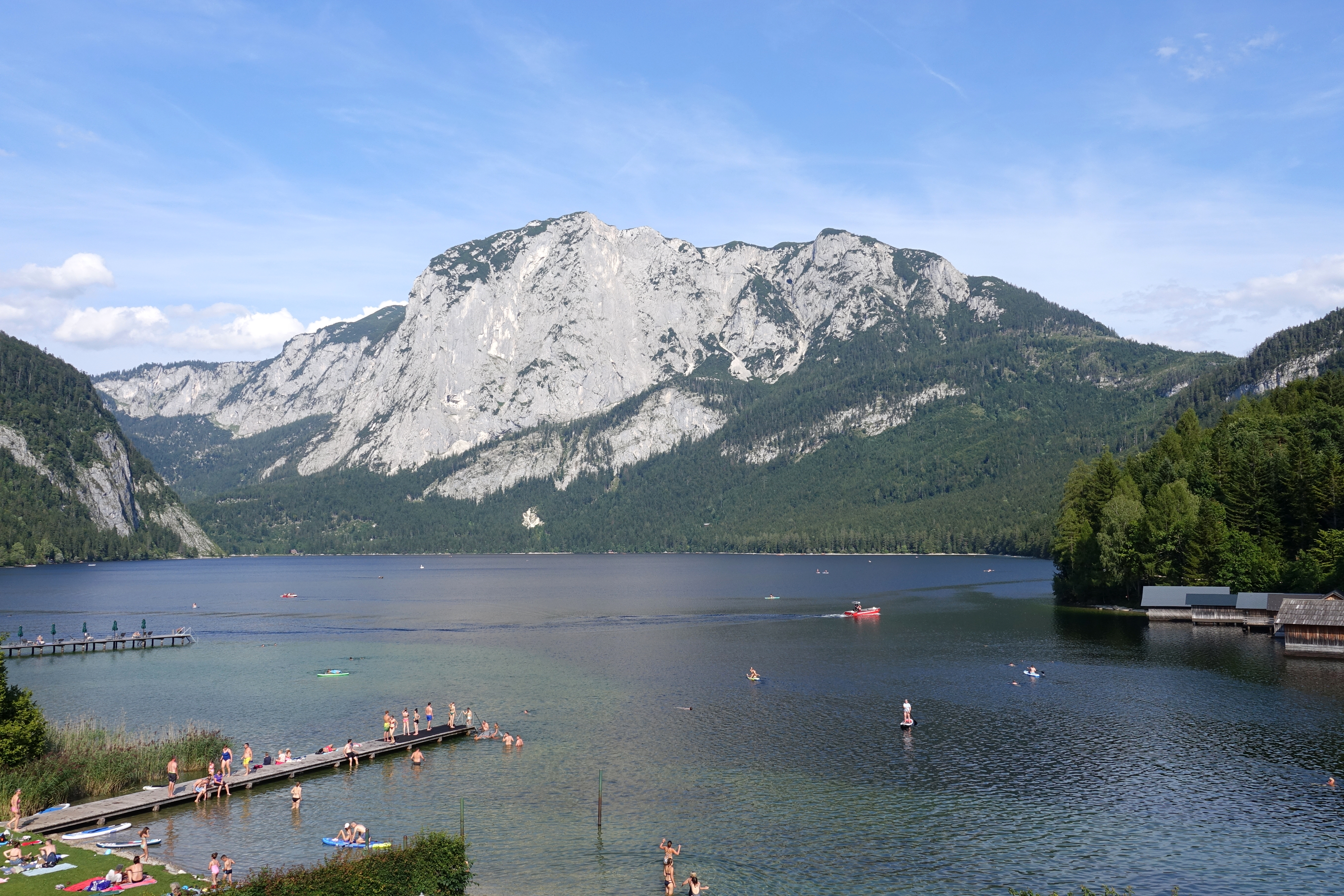
Especially in summer, the lake is used for swimming because of the mild water temperatures

Lake Altaussee is classified as a dimictic lake. In spring after the ice melts, the water body mixes and brings oxygen-rich water into the depths. In the summer half-year, a distinct thermocline forms, and only the surface layer warms up, in autumn mixing occurs again, followed by ice formation. Strict stratification conditions are present in Lake Altaussee. The epilimnion has only a very small thickness of about two meters. The metalimnion lies at a depth of about five meters. The uniformly temperate hypolimnion begins at 10 meters. The strikingly high position of the metalimnion is due to the relatively wind-protected location and only moderate flooding of the lake. After the spring circulation, surface water temperatures gradually increase, reaching a long-term average of 16.3 °C in August. However, between 2000 and 2006, the mean August temperature was higher at 18.4 °C, nearly 2 °C above the long-term average. The highest recorded water temperature in the lake was 21.8 °C during the summer of 2003. At depths below 15 meters, temperatures average around 4.6 °C. Throughout the summer stagnation phase, the hypolimnion warms up by an average of only 0.3 °C. The lake is typically covered by ice for an average of 57 days each year.

=== Trophy ===
The lake has a low concentration of nutrients and is thus oligotrophic. Measurements in the years 2000 to 2006 showed an average phosphorus content of 6.7 μg/L. Due to the discharge of untreated wastewater, a eutrophication trend could be detected in the years 1963 to 1973 and the oxygen saturation above ground was already decreasing. In addition, bacteriological tests revealed the presence of salmonella. As a result, remediation measures began, which were completed in 1980 with the construction of a regional association sewage treatment plant with a third treatment stage in the municipal area of Bad Aussee. The hygienic situation of the bathing areas improved rapidly and the oligotrophic condition of the lake could be maintained. Several supply and disposal pipes run through the lake, connecting the rest areas at the Seewiese and the beach café located on the southern shore to the sewage system. Due to the low phytoplankton concentration and low algae growth, the average summer visibility depth is 8.9 meters.

=== Plankton ===
According to chlorophyll studies, algae growth in Lake Altaussee is relatively low. Cryptophyceae and diatoms are the principal phytoplankton community components, with species from the genus Cyclotella standing out. In particular, Cyclotella Styria is a unique species found exclusively in Lake Altaussee and Lake Grundlsee. The zooplankton community, on the other hand, exhibits significantly higher biomass. Among the rotifers, the species Kellicottia longispina, Keratella cochlearis, and Keratella hiemalis were frequently observed. The crustacean plankton in Lake Altaussee is largely composed of species such as Cyclops abyssorum, Eudiaptomus gracilis, Daphnia hyalina, and Eubosmina longispina.

== Flora and vegetation ==
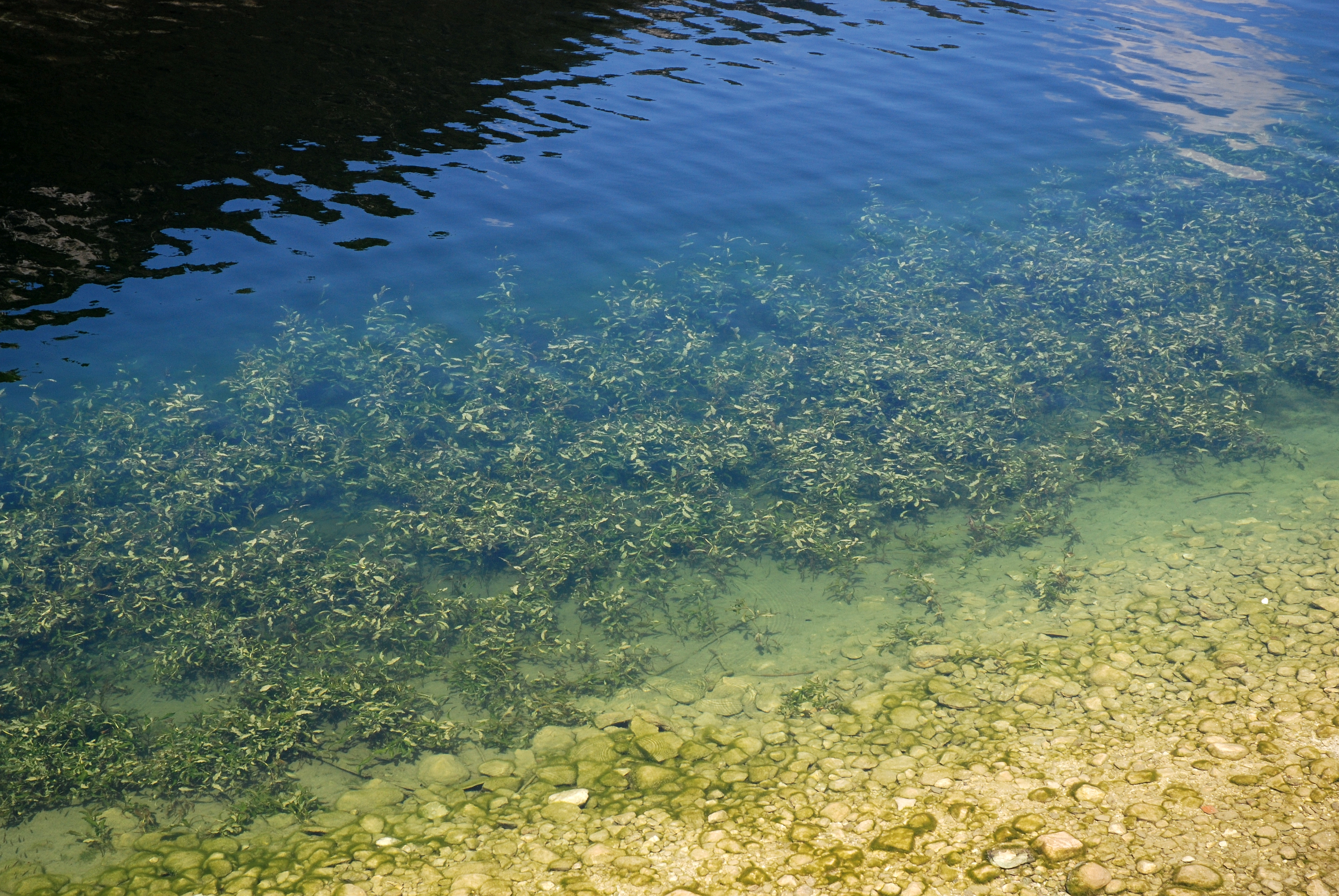
Mirror pondweed ( Potamogeton lucens ) is the most common aquatic plant in the lake, south shore 2013

The potential natural vegetation on the riparian slopes is a spruce-fir-beech forest (Aposerido-Fagetum). However, centuries of prioritizing spruce as a fuel source for the salt flats have led to a significant depletion and displacement of fir and beech trees. Snow heath-red pine forests (Erico-Pinetum) can only be found in the rockiest, driest regions. In the Seewiese, a treeless area created by mowing and grazing, there are tall perennials such as meadowsweet ( Filipendula ulmaria ), ring thistle ( Carduus personata ), and monkshood (Aconitum napellus ). In the meadow around the hunting lodge, many star daffodils (Narcissus radiiflorus) bloom in the second half of May. On the shore edge of the lake meadow grows the very rare shore buttercup (Ranunculus reptans). It is found in Austria and on the shores of Lake Constance. On the very dry, steep, and south-exposed slopes of the “Bumpy Stone Walls” in the shore area grows the mountain laserwort (Laserpitium siler), the only host plant of the mountain cumin summer work (Orobanche laserpitii-sileris), which is highly uncommon in Austria. This full parasite reaches flowering there only in wet years.

In Lake Altaussee, mirror pondweed (Potamogeton lucens), alpine pondweed (Potamogeton alpinus), crested pondweed (Stuckenia pectinate), Berchtold's dwarf pondweed (Potamogeton berchtoldii) and hairy-leaved water crowfoot (Ranunculus trichophyllus) occur in larger stands in places in the shallower shore areas. Grass pondweed (Potamogeton gramineus) grows only locally in the reed stand (Phragmites australis) on the north bank and marsh pond thread (Zannichellia palustris) on the bank near the church. Dense stonewort algae lawns on the former alluvial cone of the Augstbach are conspicuous.

== Fauna ==
The fish population of Lake Altaussee is composed of the following species: burbot (Lota lota), chub (Squalius cephalus), minnow (Phoxinus phoxinus), perch (Perca fluviatilis), lake Trout (Salmo trutta) and arctic Char (Salvelinus alpinus). The perch is not native to the lake. The common pond mussel (Anodonta anatina) lives sporadically on the former alluvial cone of the Augstbach. The green jelly spherule (Ophrydium versatile) is also common.

About 6 species of waterfowl have been recorded in the area. In addition to the common annual birds’ coot (Fulica atra), mute swan (Cygnus olor), mallard (Anas platyrhynchos), and tufted duck (Aythya fuligula), the great crested grebe (Podiceps cristatus) is also among the breeding birds. The great egret (Ardea alba) also lives at the lake.

== Nature Conservation ==
With its largely undeveloped shores with nearby marshes and wooded steep slopes, the lake provides habitats for many animal and plant species and the area has been under nature protection since 1959. The Altaussee Nature Reserve (NSG-a03) spans 242 hectares and extends to an altitude of 1600m above sea level. In 2006, the Totes Gebirge European Protected Area with Lake Altaussee European Protected Area No. 35 was designated under the Habitats and Birds Directives as part of the Natura 2000 network.

== Research ==
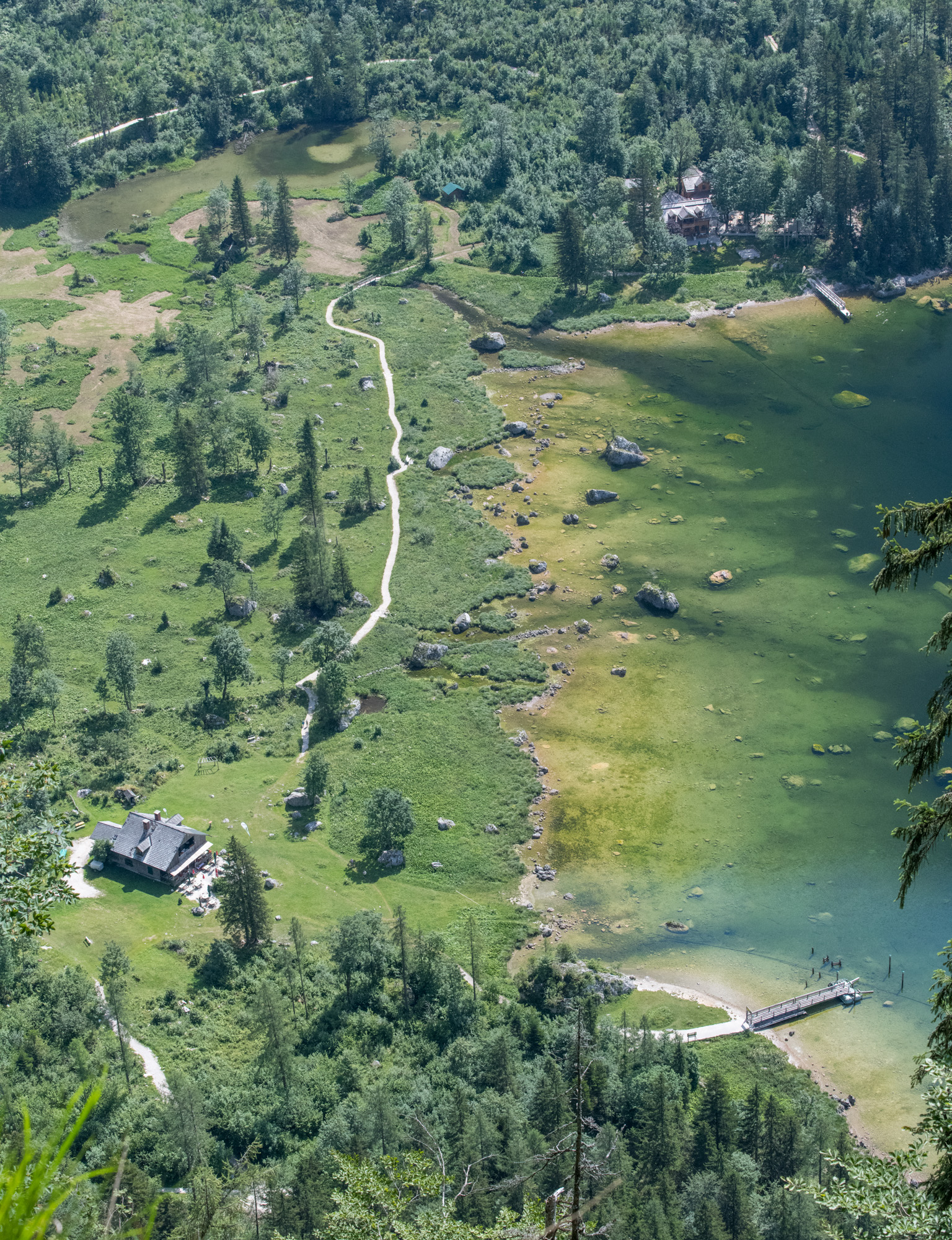
The shallow pools of the Seewiese are an important habitat for young fish

The Walter Munk Foundation for the Oceans supports research projects in the field of limnology, ecology, and underwater archaeology at Lake Altaussee. Together with the University of Natural Resources and Applied Life Sciences Vienna, a high-resolution multibeam echo sounder was used to create a detailed 3D model of the lake bottom in 2019. It shows, among other things, sediment formations of various kinds, large boulders, crater-shaped underwater springs, and around 100 standing tree trunks with heights of one to about fifteen meters distributed over the entire lake. In the summer of 2022, a 10-meter-tall white fir (Abies alba) was recovered from the lake. By combining dendrochronology and radiocarbon methods, the age could be accurately determined. The tree has 247 annual rings and died in 859 AD. The rootstock of the fir can be visited on the north bank. How the approximately 100 tree trunks got into the lake - for example, through a tectonic event, or whether they grew in the site - require further investigation.

== Economy ==
=== Fishing ===
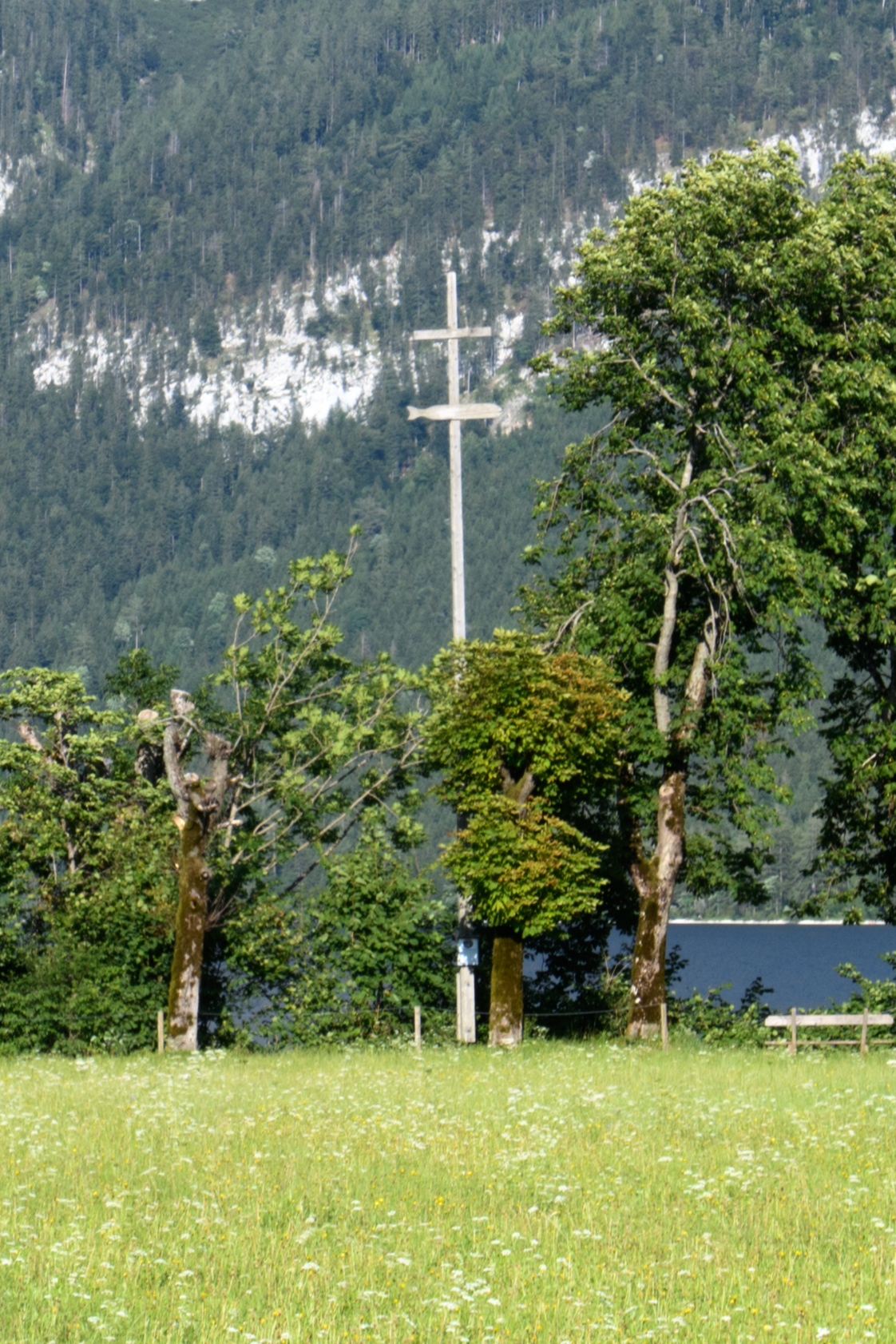
The Fisherman's Cross on the west bank

Lake fishing in Altaussee has a documented history dating back to the 13th century. The fishing activities were under the authority of the sovereign lordship of Pflindsberg, and only a selected group of residents from the village of Fischerndorf had the privilege to engage in fishing. These individuals were obligated to pay fishing fees, which granted them the right to fish. The fishing operations were organized by guilds, as indicated by the name Fischerndorf. The allocation of fishing rights was based on the size of the land owned by the entitled farmers. In Altaussee, fishing rights are passed down through generations and are considered hereditary. The Austrian Federal Forests hold the lake, but the rights of the fishermen are registered in the land register and have been owned by the local families for generations. Fishing in the lake is still conducted professionally to this day.

Lake Altaussee is renowned for its large char and trout populations, with Arctic char accounting for approximately 90% of the total catch. The shallow and flowing water on the lake side of the Seeklause serves as a crucial spawning area for lake trout, which spawn from October to December. To prevent the fish from migrating into the Traun River, grids are installed under the bridge during the spawning season. Additionally, there is a spawning sanctuary (Laichschonstätte) located at the Lechthütte on the southeast bank. The char in Lake Altaussee spawn from October to November on gravel banks that are free of silt, typically at a depth of around 20 meters. To support the char population, a portion of the fish is captured using nets during what is known as "leaching batches." The eggs are then stripped and fertilized to cultivate young fish. During the summer, these young fish are released back into the lake. The fishermen's cross, located on the western shore, used to serve as a guide to locate the spawning grounds and the best fishing spots for Arctic char. Fishermen would navigate with a flatboat to a specific point where the alignment of the Granzling, the tip of the flatboat, the fisherman's cross, and the Dietrichskogel formed a line. The cross needed to be positioned on the horizon of the Dietrichskogel. In the past, the fisherman's cross was a freestanding structure easily visible from all directions. However, it is now obscured by tall trees.

The perch (Perca fluviatilis) was not originally native to the lake but entered the water body at the end of the 1980s for yet unexplained reasons. As a foreign fish species, it changed the aquatic ecosystem and caused damage to the population of minnows and Arctic char, on whose spawn it feeds. To restore the balance, attempts are being made to reduce the population of the perch. One method involves placing submerged spruce branches, where the perch lay their eggs, and then removing the branches to destroy the fish eggs.

=== Shipping ===
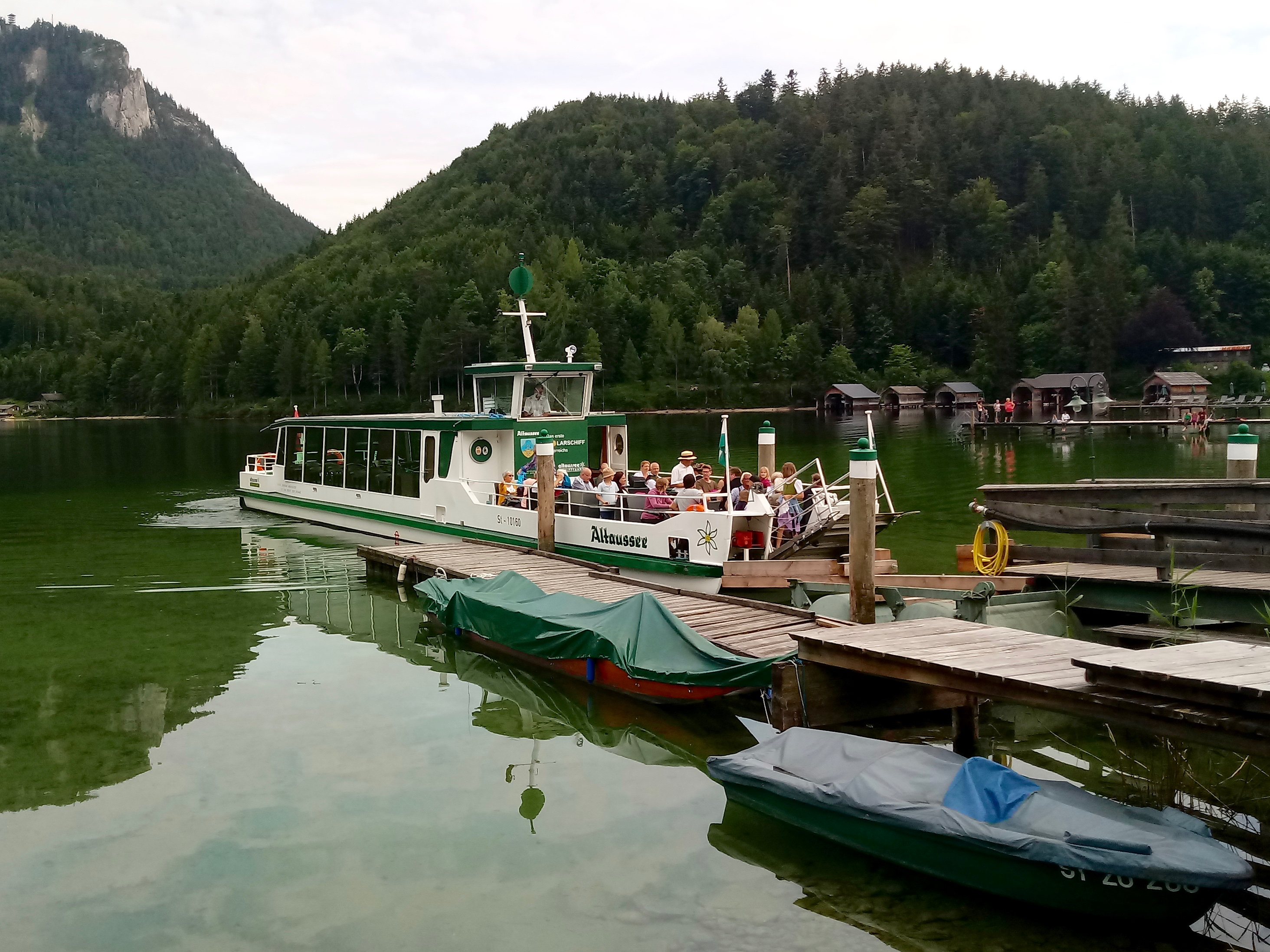
The Altaussee 2019

The company Stern Schifffahrt GmbH, based in Gmunden, operates shipping on Lake Altaussee. Boats run regularly between the Madlmaier landing stage in Altaussee and the Seewiese landing stage on the northeast shore. On May 7, 2011, the Altaussee, Austria's first solar-electric powered catamaran, began operating on the lake. The boat has room for 80 passengers. Since 2018, the company has also been offering flatboat trips including skippers. Combustion engines are prohibited on ships and boats in Lake Altaussee, as well as on all lakes in the inner Salzkammergut region. However, there are some exceptions to this rule, including professional fishing, liner shipping, and vehicles used by rescue and fire departments.

=== Tourism ===
Lake Altaussee is a popular destination for excursions because of its beautiful location. In Altaussee exists a distinctive tourist infrastructure with accommodation and catering establishments. The hunting lodge Seewiese on the northeast shore was originally owned by the Hohenlohe-Schillingsfürst family and is now run as an inn. It contains a small natural history museum on the second floor, which focuses on Lake Altaussee and the numerous fossils found in the region. To the south of the Seewiese, an inn dating from the 1900s was purchased by Dietrich Mateschitz and rebuilt in local style in May 2018. Most of the shore is freely accessible. Public bathing jetties are located at the Seeklausanger parking lot and at the Seepark in Altaussee. Lake Altaussee is also suitable for ice skating and curling, as it often freezes over completely in winter. During the Daffodil Festival at the end of May/beginning of June, which lasts several days, a boat parade takes place every third year on Lake Altaussee. Here, sculptures decorated with star daffodils are put on display.

== History ==
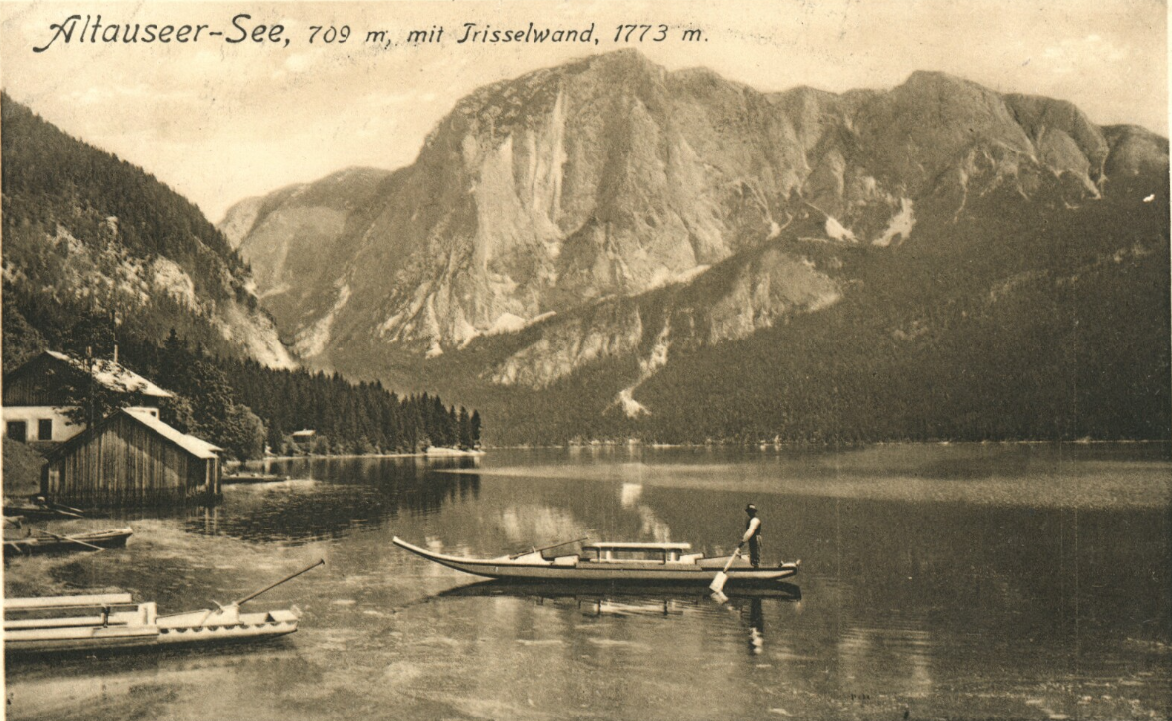
Lake Altaussee around 1910

At the outlet of Lake Altaussee, like other lakes in the inner Salzkammergut, there existed a hermitage specifically used for wood drifting. With relatively modest means, this location allowed for the storage of large quantities of water. The first mention of this hermitage dates back to the forest survey of 1561. In 1633, a new building was constructed, entirely made of wood at the time. The reconstruction of the Seeklause using ashlars began in 1781. Additionally, an external rake was built around 1300 to gather the floated wood. However, after the brewing operation in Aussee market in 1867, the rake fell into disuse. The final wood drifting event on the Altaussee Traun occurred in 1882. Presumably, the Klause was destroyed during a flood in 1899. Subsequent to the catastrophic floods of 1897 and 1899, the remaining traces of the rake were eliminated as part of the shore reinforcement measures.

In the last days of the Second World War, a truck was sunk on the north bank. Today, this consists only of fragments scattered over an area of about 20 × 40 m.

== Lake Altaussee in Art ==
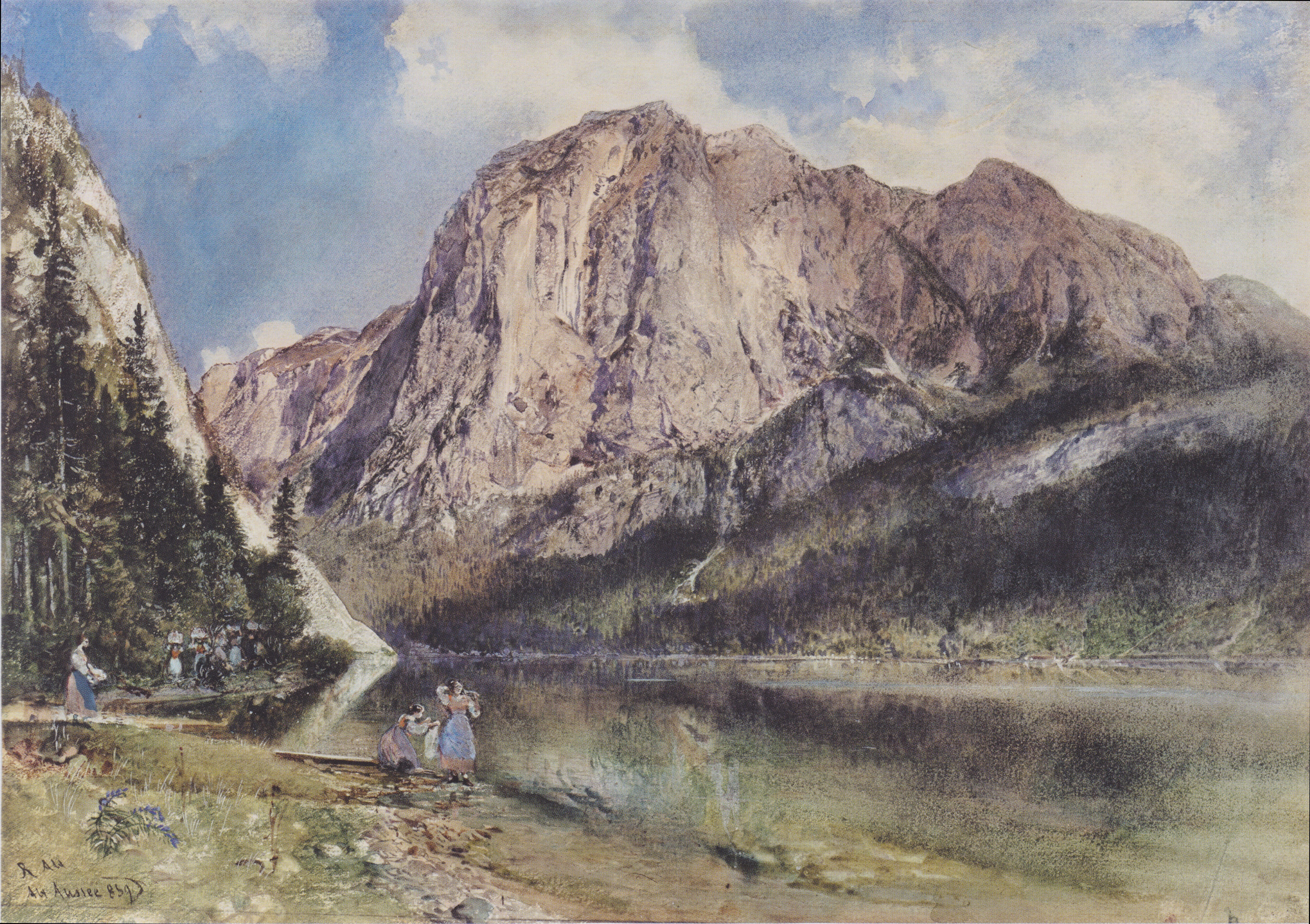
Rudolf von Alt: Lake Altaussee with Trisselwand, 1839

As the nobility began to settle in Ausseerland, Altaussee also attracted more and more writers, painters, and musicians. From the middle of the 19th century, Altaussee developed into a "home of writers". Raoul Auernheimer, in his autobiography "Das Wirtshaus zur verlorenen Zeit", compares the lake to an inkwell into which “the poets sitting around in circles dipped their quills”. The influence of the lake is documented in the Altaussee Literature Museum.

The lake and the hunting lodge Seewiese were filming locations for the James Bond film Spectre in 2015.
