= Altaussee =

Place in Styria, Austria

Altaussee Oid Aussee
- Municipality
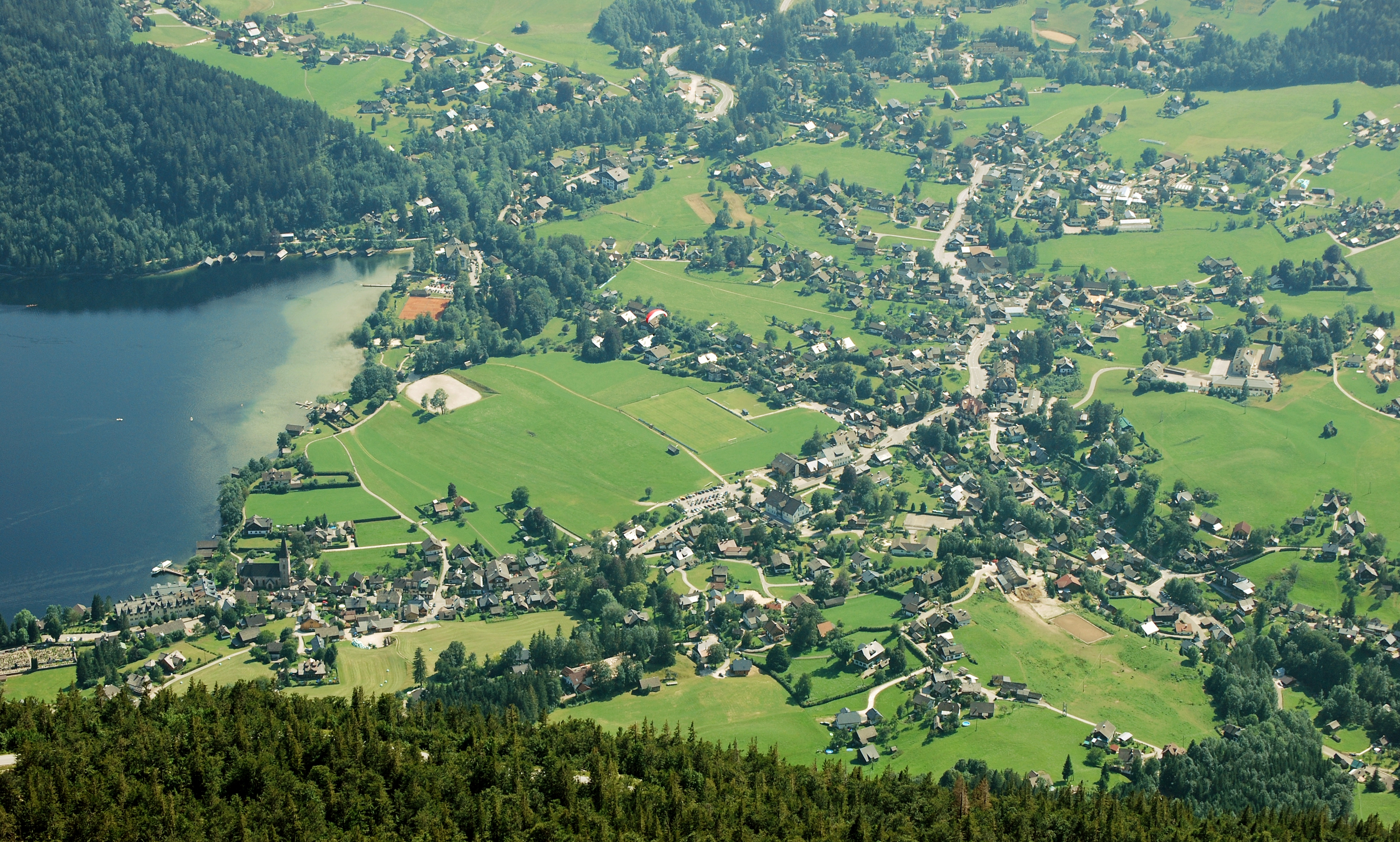

- Coat of arms

- Location within Austria
- Coordinates: 47°36′36″N 13°46′58″E
- Country: Austria
- State: Styria
- District: Liezen

Government
  - Mayor: Herbert Pichler (ÖVP)

Area
  - Total: 92.58 km^{2} (35.75 sq mi)
- Elevation: 712 m (2,336 ft)

Population (2025)
  - Total: 1,913
  - Density: 20.66/km^{2} (53.52/sq mi)
- Time zone: UTC+1 (CET)
  - Summer (DST): UTC+2 (CEST)
- Postal code: 8992
- Area code: 03622
- Vehicle registration: LI
- Website: Official website

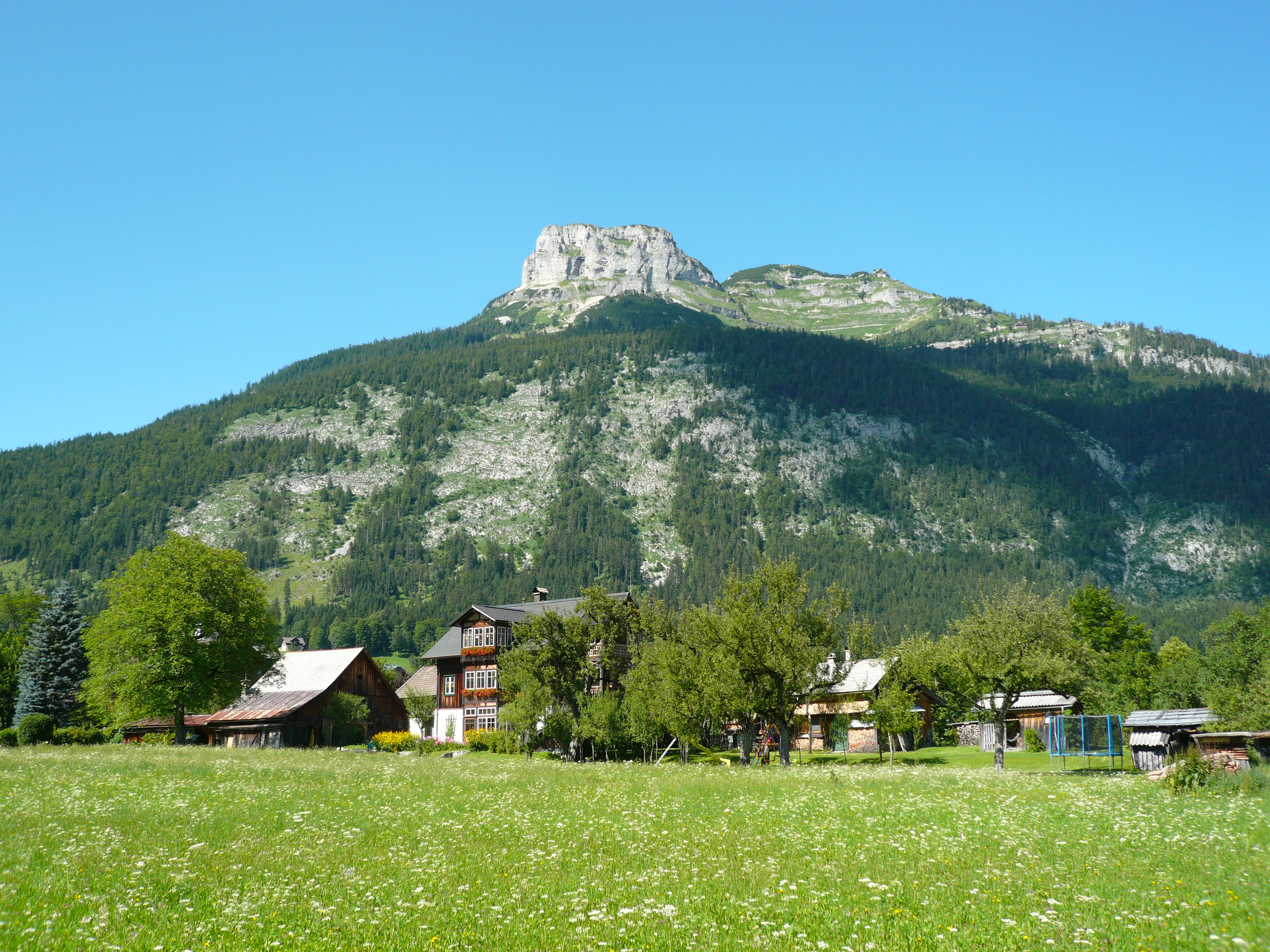
View of the Loser, the local mountain of Altaussee

Altaussee (German: [ˈalt.aʊ̯sˌseː]; Central Bavarian: Oid Aussee) is a municipality and spa town in the district of Liezen in Styria, Austria. The small village is nestled on the shores of the Lake Altaussee, beneath the Loser Plateau. Occupying an area of 92 km^{2} (36 sq mi), Altaussee is home to 1,777 people. The municipality includes two cadastral communities: Altaussee and Lupitsch. The designated climatic spa is within the Salzkammergut region. Altaussee has the biggest salt deposits of Austria, which are still mined today.

== Geography ==
The municipality is located in the small Ausseerland-Region within the Styrian part of the Salzkammergut in the district of Liezen in Styria. Altaussee covers an area of 92.11 km^{2} (35.56 sq mi) and is located at 712 m (2,336 ft) above sea level on the western shore of Lake Altaussee on the southwestern edge of the Totes Gebirge. The community center is located in a valley, which is encircled by mountains. The most noticeable of these peaks are the Loser (1,838 m or 6,030 ft) to the north, the Trisselwand (1,755 m or 5,758 ft) to the east and the Sandling (1,717 m or 5,633 ft) to the west. The highest mountain within the community area is the Schoenberg (2,093 m or 6,867 ft) close to the border with Upper Austria. Due to the alpine location and the strong share of the Totes Gebirge about half of the municipal area consists of alpine wasteland, the rest are forests, grasslands and other land forms.

Nearby towns are Bad Aussee, Hallstatt, Bad Goisern, Bad Ischl and Gmunden.

=== Local geology ===
The characteristic pale grey mountains which surround Altaussee are made of limestone, a carbonate rock. The age of these rocks are Triassic and Jurassic. The mountains themselves did not form until the Cenozoic, when immense forces between the colliding African and Eurasian plates caused the mountains to be uplifted. The limestones which make up the mountains are white to pale grey in colour, and formed relatively deep in the ancient Tethys Ocean. Because the rocks formed so deep, fossils are rare. However, corals are reported from the lower slopes of Loser mountain.

==== Tectonics ====
A major tectonic fault line runs directly beneath the Lake Altaussee, approximately east–west, and terminates in the valley west of the Seewiese. The fault is seismically active, with small earthquakes common. On a hot, clear day in August 1998, a small earthquake on the fault (M=3) caught summer bathers by surprise with a low, rumbling sound and, a few minutes later, unusually high waves.

==== Evaporites ====
Large evaporite reserves are present in the Sandling mountain, formed as a result of a major period of marine lowstand, when the sea level was low and the sea dried out. Panning and surface-level drift mining of the deposits dates back to Roman times, thanks to evidence from archaeological excavations in the 1990s, followed by similar local works from 200-400 AD. By 1147 the mines had become a commercial venture, controlled by the Rein Abbey near Graz. In 1211 the mines were nationalised by Leopold VI, Duke of Austria, who transferred control to Unterlupitsch. With operations later transferred to Bad Aussee, investment in 1319 allowed the opening of the Steinberg tunnel. Followed by further periods on investment, by 1334, the mines were operated under license by the private Hallinger Union who employed 120 people, producing about 10,000 tonnes (22,000,000 lb) of product per annum. Renationalised by Frederick III in 1445, 120 people produced about 1,000 tonnes (2,200,000 lb) of product per annum until the early 20th century. In 1906, a new brine pipeline through the Rettenbach Valley to Bad Ischl to supply the Solvay Works located in the market town of Ebensee. Production volumes in the following years quadrupled, and employees doubled to 238.

By 1938, the salt mine had come to the attention of Adolf Hitler. Located close to his intended museum complex in Linz, inside the mine the conditions were constant: between 40 and 47 °C (104 and 117 °F); about 65 percent humidity; with the deepest tunnels more than 1.6 kilometres (1 mi) inside the mountain, safe from enemy bombs. The Nazi's built floors, walls, and shelving as well as a workshop deep in the chambers.

Post-war after recovery of the art, brine production resumed. The mines are still operational today, and brine is pumped to the market town of Ebensee. In 2008, 61 employees produced 1,506,000 m^{3} (53,200,000 cu ft) of brine, with a salt content of 450 thousand tonnes (0.99 billion pounds). It is for this reason that Altaussee, and other local towns and villages such as Hallstatt, are now part of the Salzkammergut region.

== History ==
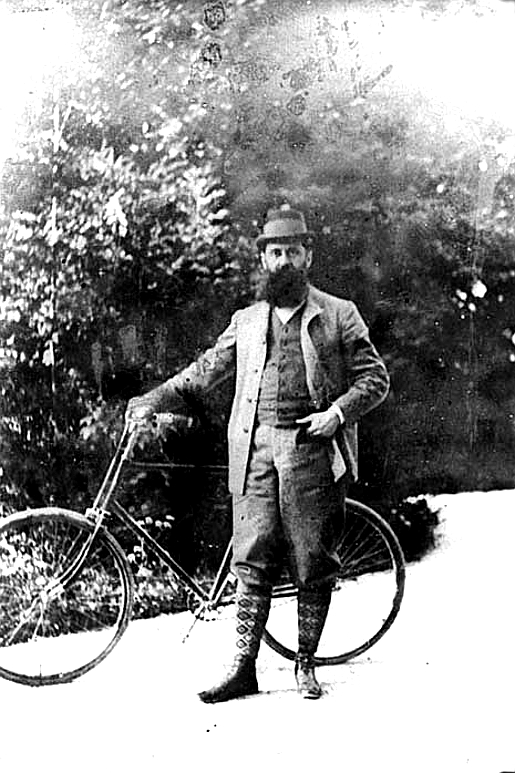
Theodor Herzl at Altaussee 1900

The oldest settlement on the ground of the modern village of Altaussee dates back to the Roman rule (200-400 AD). However, there is no historical continuity of a settlement before the Middle Ages. The salt mine on the ground of the modern village was first documented in 1147 AD, the village itself in 1265.

Around 1250 Philipp of Spanheim, the Archbishop-elect of Salzburg, occupied the Ausseerland and the Ennstal. For the coverage of his claim to power he built the small Pflindsberg castle on a hill east of the Altaussee village. He had to withdraw in 1254 and the region returned to Styria. In the following centuries the Pflindsberg castle developed into a regional seignory with the right to hold high justice. It was administered by an official of the styrian Landesfürst.

In 1848 manorialism was abolished in the cisleithanian part of the Austrian Empire and Altaussee became an autonomous political municipality.

In the 19th century Altaussee evolved into a popular summer-resort. Especially writers and intellectuals, for example Hugo von Hofmannsthal, Jakob Wassermann, Theodor Herzl and Friedrich Torberg, spent their summer holidays in the small alpine village.

=== World War II ===
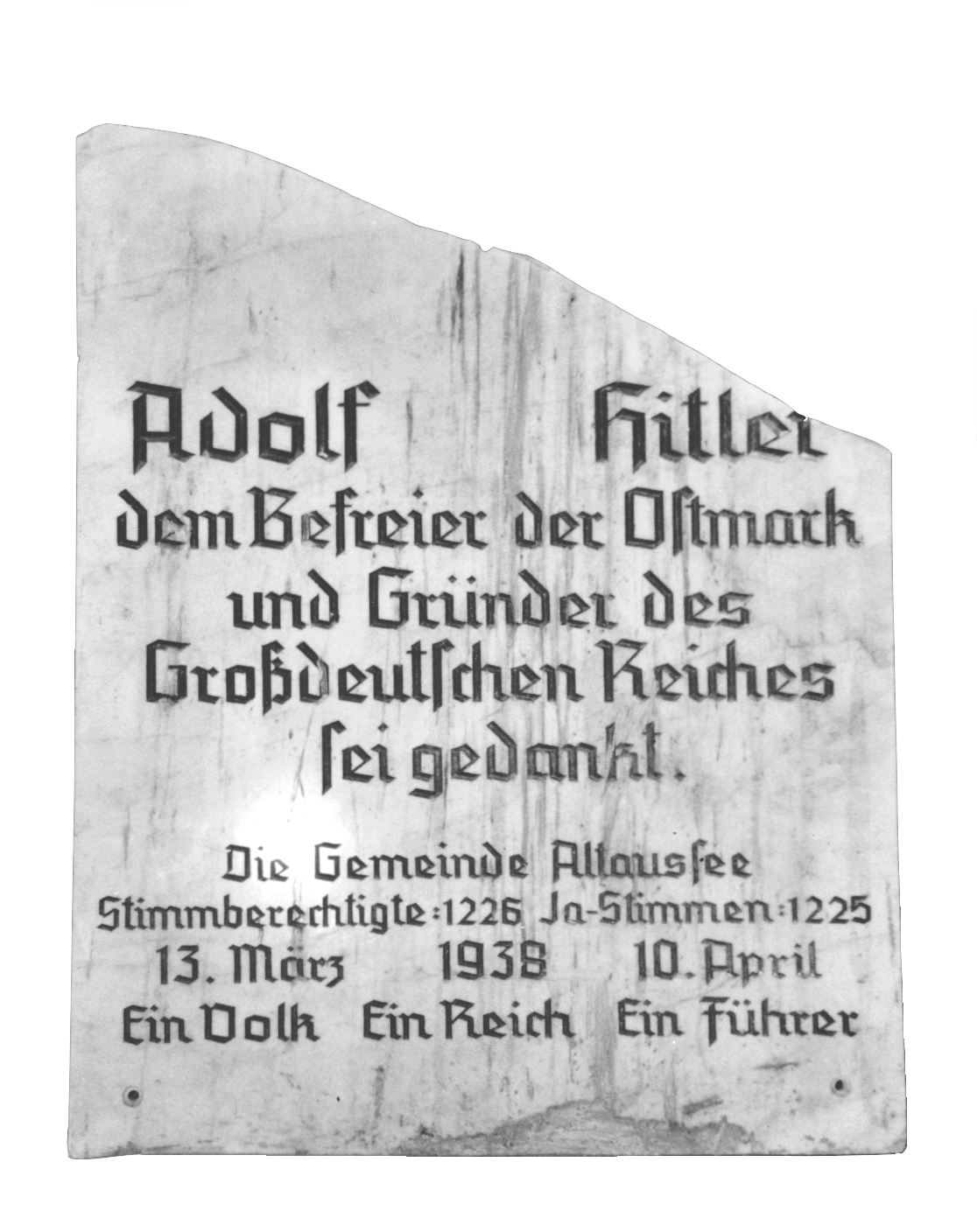
Memorial plaque for the Austrian plebiscite for the Anschluss on the 10 April 1938, Altaussee 1938

After the annexation of Austria into the German Third Reich in 1938 the entire Ausseerland region (a small region in Styria consisting of Bad Aussee, Grundlsee and Altaussee) was incorporated into the new administrative unit Reichsgau Oberdonau (Upper Austria). The autonomy of the municipalities Bad Aussee, Grundlsee and Altaussee was dissolved and one single Bürgermeisterei (mayoralty) was established in Bad Aussee. The municipal offices of Altaussee and Grundlsee were henceforth field offices of Bad Aussee. The 29 country residences in possession of Jewish families were aryanized. In the following time the community attracted many top Nazis who inhabited these aryanized country estates. For example, three Nazi Gauleiter regularly spent their holidays in Altaussee: August Eigruber, Konrad Henlein and Hugo Jury. The Nazi propaganda minister Joseph Goebbels spent his holidays in an "aryanized" country residence at the neighbouring Grundlsee.

As of spring 1944, there was a permanent shelter for Wehrmacht deserters, draft dodgers and resisters hidden in the rough terrain of the Totes Gebirge north of the village. This hideout called Igel (hedgehog), was provided with food by trusted third parties in the population. At the end of the war the Igel sheltered 35 people.

The Ausseerland region was part of the so-called Alpine fortress. It is for this reason, why 1944/45 it became a last refuge for Nazi party, government and army staffs. Also entire pro-fascist governments that had been used by the Nazis in the Balkans took refuge in the region. As of the end of the war, nine pro-Nazi governments in exile from Eastern Europe stayed in Altaussee. Günther Altenburg for example served as head the Department of Foreign Affairs of Bulgaria and Romania in Altaussee, where he oversaw the Germany-impaired exiled governments of Bulgaria and Romania (see also: Bulgarian government-in-exile). Ernst Kaltenbrunner, head of the SS-Reichssicherheitshauptamt, moved his headquarters from Berlin to the Villa Kerry in Altaussee in late April 1945. From here, with the help of Wilhelm Höttl, he was trying to contact the Western Allies to reach a separate peace. At the end of the war several high Nazi and SS officials, like August Eigruber, Hugo Jury, Adolf Eichmann, Franz Stangl (commandant of the Sobibor and Treblinka extermination camps) and Anton Burger (Commandant of Theresienstadt concentration camp), tried to go into hiding in the village.

On 8 May 1945 a reconnaissance squadron of the U.S. Seventh Army reached the Ausseerland region followed by the main force of the U.S. Army on the next day. Previously to the arrival of the U.S. Army, a self-employed civilian government was formed in Bad Aussee which preserved the order and ensured the supply of the population. Ernst Kaltenbrunner fled to the Wildensee alp nearby Altaussee where he was captured by a U.S. patrol on 12 May 1945. At the end of the war a box of 60 kilograms (130 lb) Nazi gold was found near the mansion in which Kaltenbrunner had lived. Much of it has been lost since the turmoil of the early post-war days.

In the two world wars, a total of 162 citizens of Altaussee fell as soldiers (44 in World War I and 118 in World War II). (Note: Numbers of the fallen citizens according to the death roll of the Altaussee war memorial.)

On 1 July 1948 the village became part of the Austrian state Styria again. Until 1955 Altaussee was part of the American occupation zone in Austria.

==== Nazi repository for stolen art ====
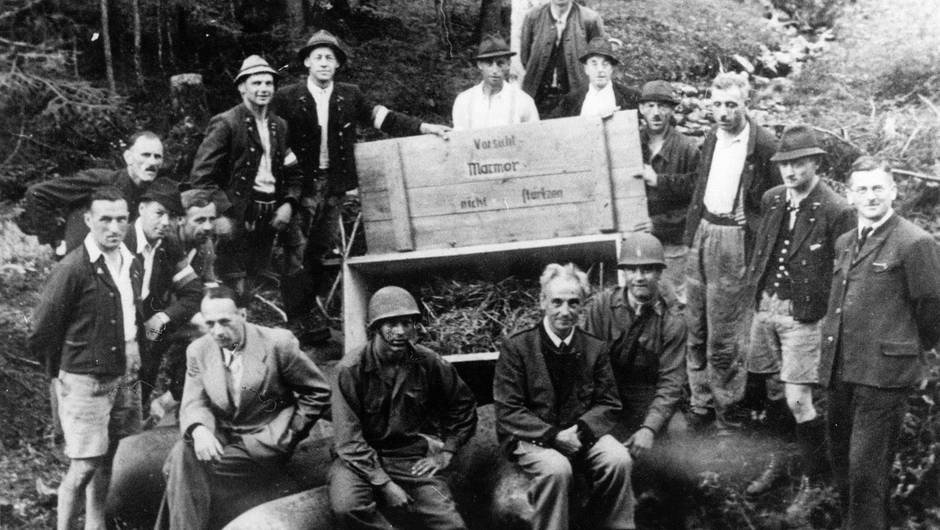
Altaussee, May 1945 after the removal of the eight 500-kilogram (1,100 lb) bombs at the Nazi stolen art repository

In 1943–1945, the extensive complex of salt mines in Altaussee served as a huge repository for art stolen by the Nazis. These artworks were accumulated under the alias Sonderauftrag Linz (Special Commission: Linz) by Adolf Hitler and were intended for the planned Führermuseum in Linz, Austria. At the end of the war the entire depot included around 6,500 paintings, as well as many statues, furniture, weapons, coins, and libraries. After the occupation of Altaussee on 8 May 1945 by an American infantry unit, the art depot was seized by the U.S. Army (Monuments Men, events portrayed in the 2014 film The Monuments Men.

== Leisure and Sport ==
Altaussee (Station Bad Aussee, 4 km distance)

Climate chart (precipitation, max. and min. temperature)
J	F	M	A	M	J	J	A	S	O	N	D
111 2 −6	82 5 −5	112 9 −1	96 13 2	121 19 7	181 21 10	212 23 11	167 24 11	129 20 8	88 15 4	110 7 −1	124 3 −4
- █ Average max. and min. temperatures in °C
- █ Precipitation totals in mm
- Source: ZAMG
Imperial conversion
J	F	M	A	M	J	J	A	S	O	N	D
4.4 36 21	3.2 41 23	4.4 48 30	3.8 55 36	4.8 66 45	7.1 70 50	8.3 73 52	6.6 75 52	5.1 68 46	3.5 59 39	4.3 45 30	4.9 37 25
- █ Average max. and min. temperatures in °F
- █ Precipitation totals in inches

A 7.5-kilometre (4.7 mi) trail goes around the clear Lake Altaussee surrounded by 1838 m high Loser mountain the Trisslwand, the Tressenstein and other mountain ranges. Brown and white alpine-style houses with a beautiful church are in the center of town. The tourist bureau has a few English pamphlets, but most information, including the Literatur museum inside, is in German. A saltmine tour through the Altaussee saltmine and the former Nazi Stolen Art Repository is available every hour in the summer. Hiking trails abound, with various gradings. They are marked with green and white signs. The lower ones are easy to follow while the more difficult routes are sometimes less well-marked. A paradise for outdoor enthusiasts and hikers. Flora and waterfalls make the forests and mountains even more attractive in the summer. The 9-kilometre-long (5.6 mi) Loser Panorama Road leads to a perfect base (1.600 m) for hikes into the heart of the Tote Gebirge Mountain Range. From where the road ends it is only an hours walk to the Loser Peak (1.838 m). In the wintertime the ski resort of Loser offers 29 kilometres (18 mi) slopes with all levels of difficulty. In addition there are other nearby ski resorts available.

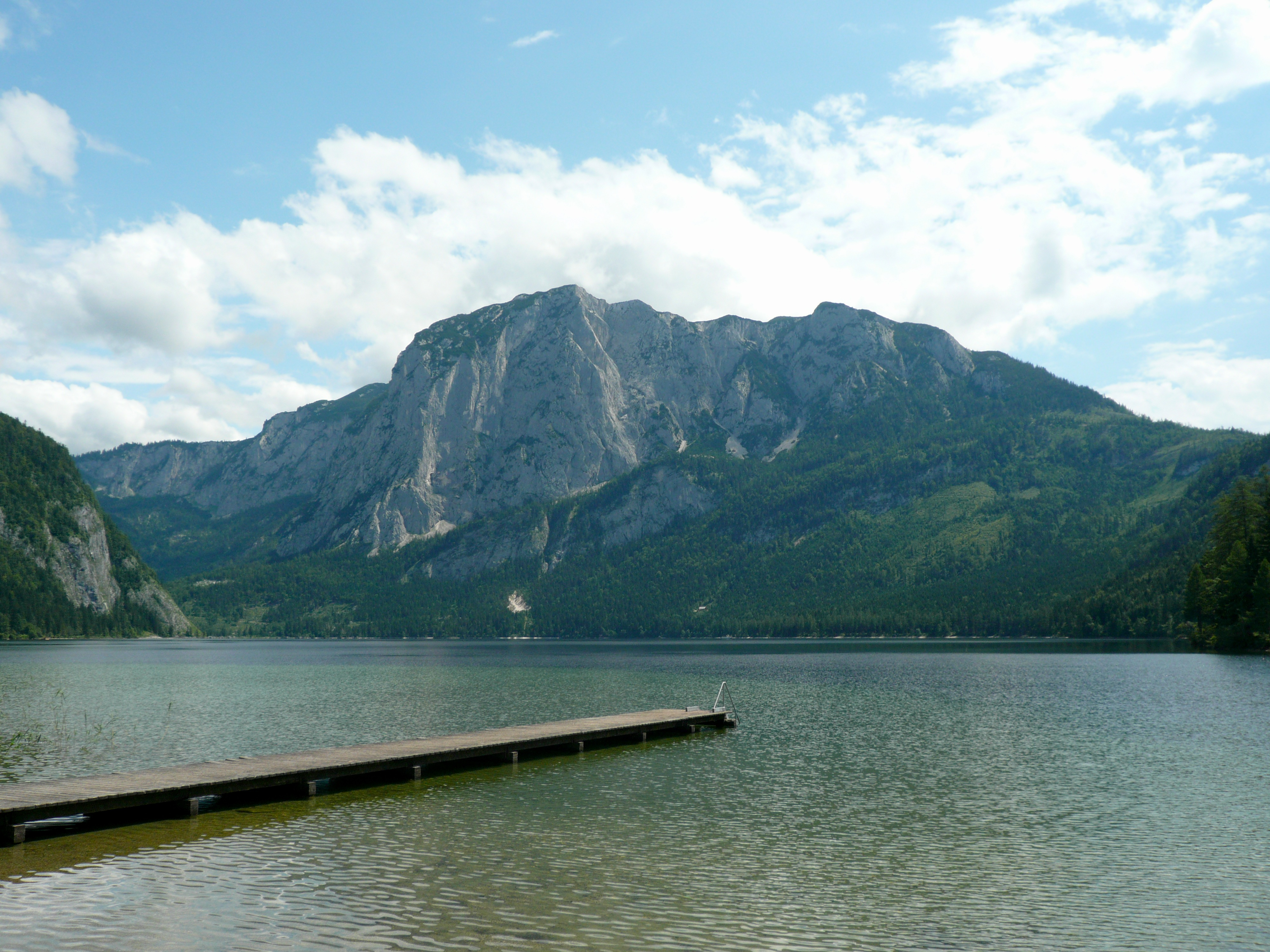
The Lake Altaussee and the Trisselwand Mountain

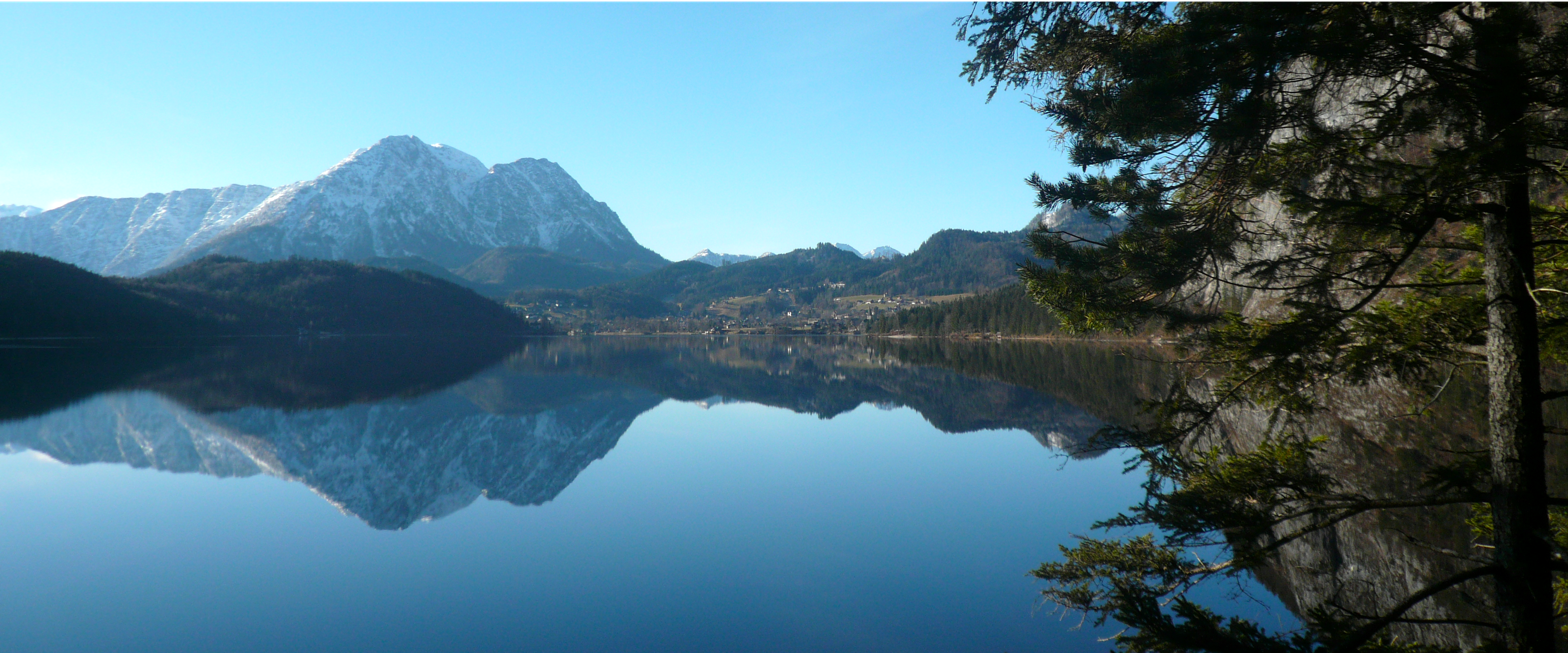
Lake Altaussee

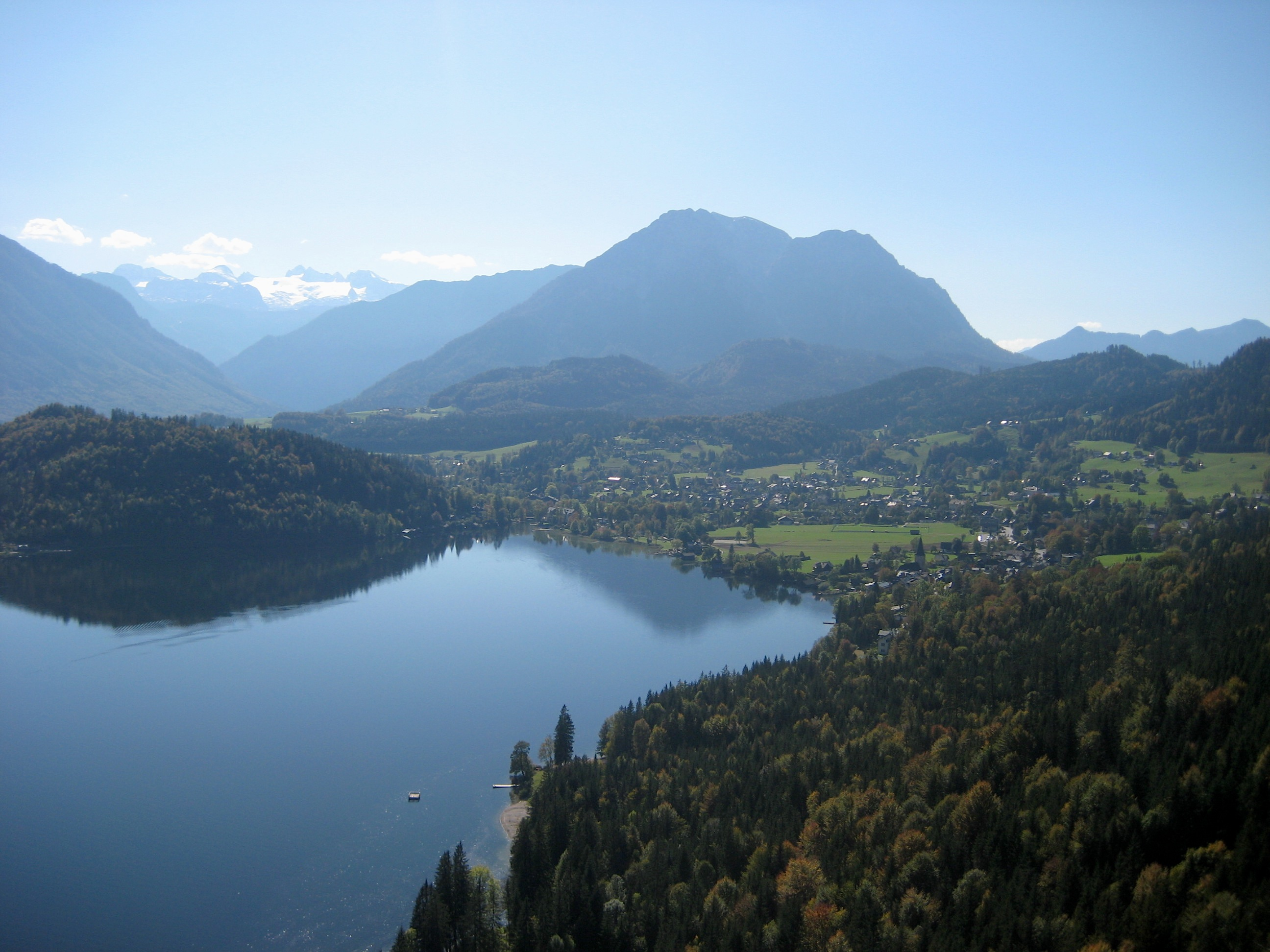
View of the Lake Altaussee and Altaussee, in the background the Hoher Dachstein

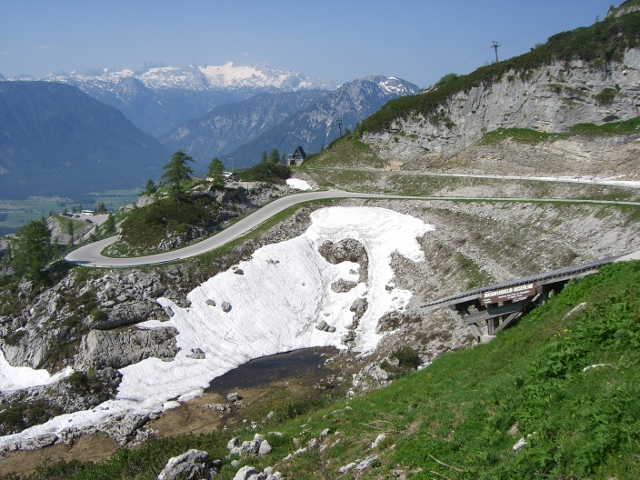
Loser Panorama Road, in the background the Hoher Dachstein

== Notable people ==
- Karin Brandauer (1945–1992), Austrian film director and screenwriter.
- Klaus Maria Brandauer (born 1943), Austrian actor, film director, and professor at the Max Reinhardt Seminar in Vienna; lives in Altaussee and Vienna.
- Marianne Feldhammer (1909–1996), Austrian resistance fighter against Nazism.
- Barbara Frischmuth (1941–2025), Austrian writer of poetry and prose.
- Joseph Fröhlich (1694–1757), court jester of Augustus II the Strong.
- Michael Moser (1853–1912), Austrian photographer.
- Hermann Markus Pressl (1939–1994), Austrian composer and music teacher.
- Paul Preuss (1886–1913), Austrian alpinist.
- Jakob Wassermann (1873–1934), German-Jewish writer.

== See also ==
- Lake Altaussee
