= Ruine Pflindsberg =

Castle ruin in Austria

Coordinates: 47°38′N 13°45′E

Pflindsberg Castle
- Altaussee, Styria, Austria
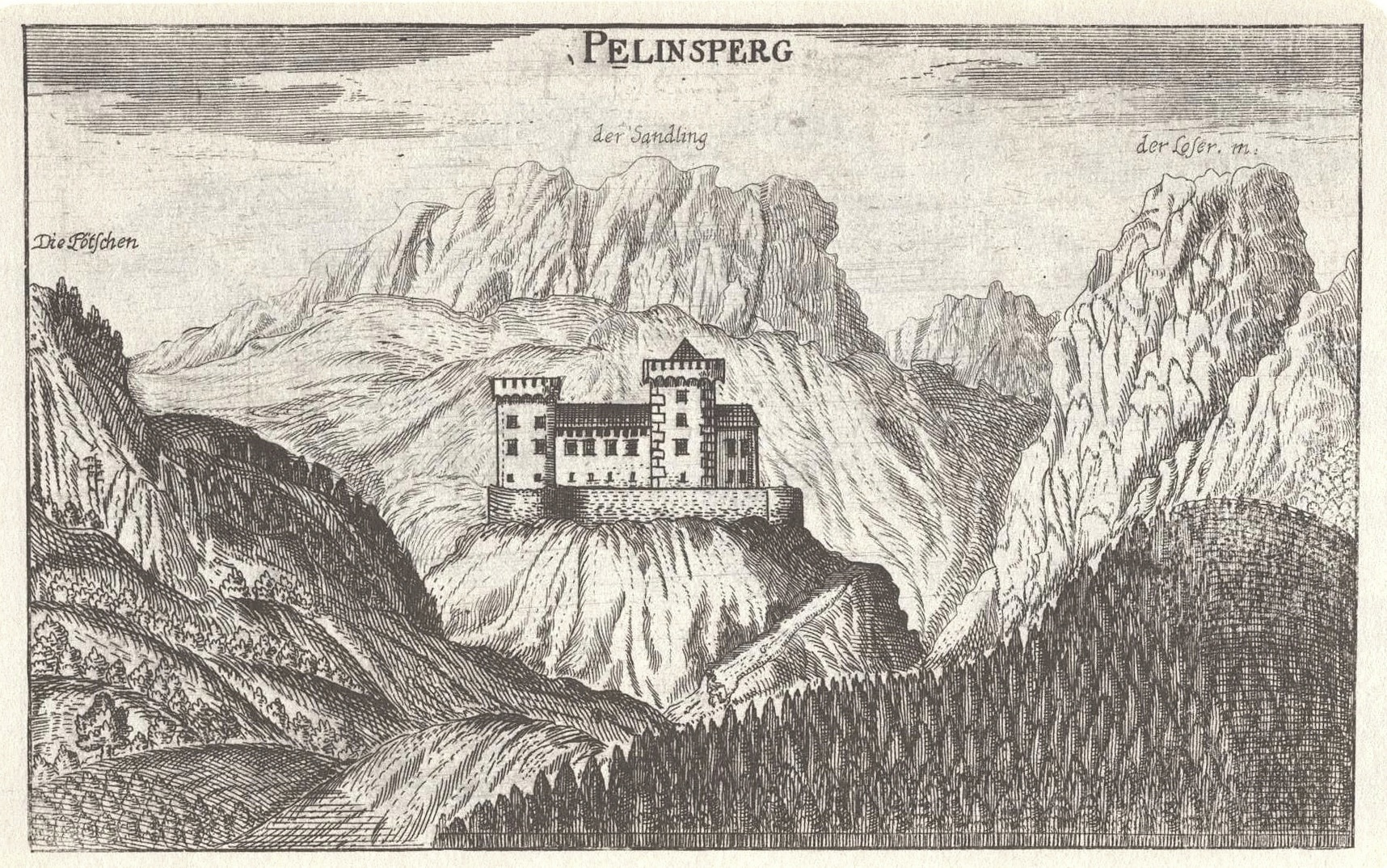
- Copper engraving by Georg Matthäus Vischer around 1681.

Site information
- Type: Hill castle
- Condition: Ruin

Location
- Height: 945 m

Site history
- Built: ~1250
- Built by: Philipp von Spanheim

Ruine Pflindsberg is a castle in Styria, Austria.

Around 1250 Philipp of Spanheim, the Archbishop-elect of Salzburg, occupied the Ausseerland and the Ennstal in Styria. For the coverage of his claim to power he built the small Pflindsberg castle on a hill west of the village Altaussee. In 1254 he had to withdraw, and the region returned to Styria. In the following centuries the Pflindsberg castle developed into a regional seignory with the right to hold high justice. It was administered by an official of the styrian Landesfürst. The castle was abandoned in 1755 and already a ruin in 1780.

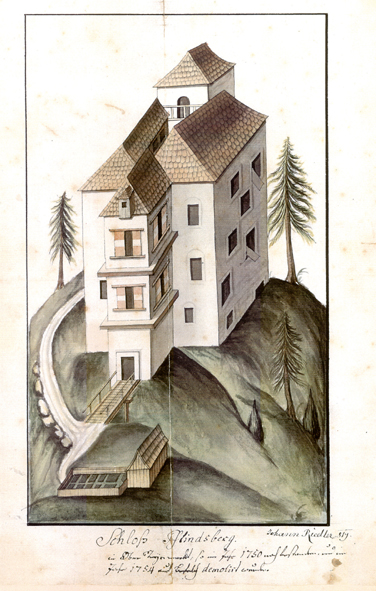
Pflindsberg Castle 1750

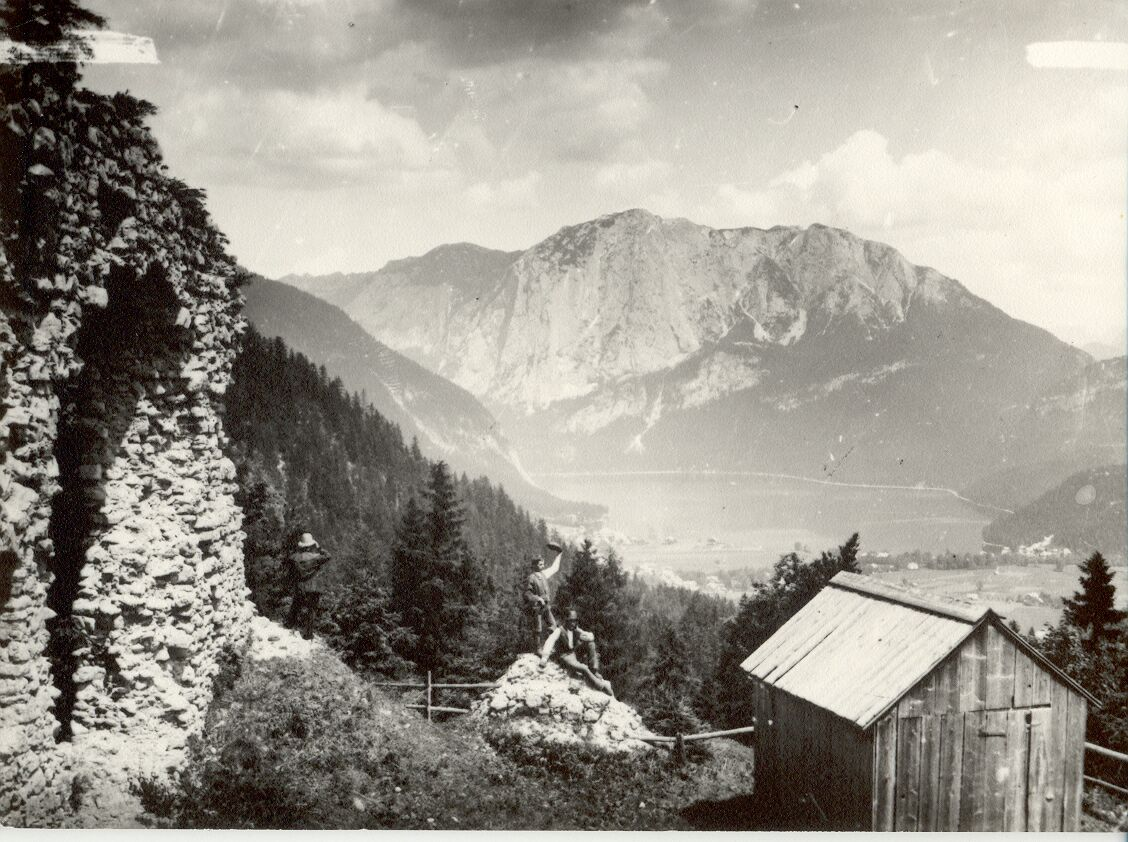
Pflindsberg Castle around 1900

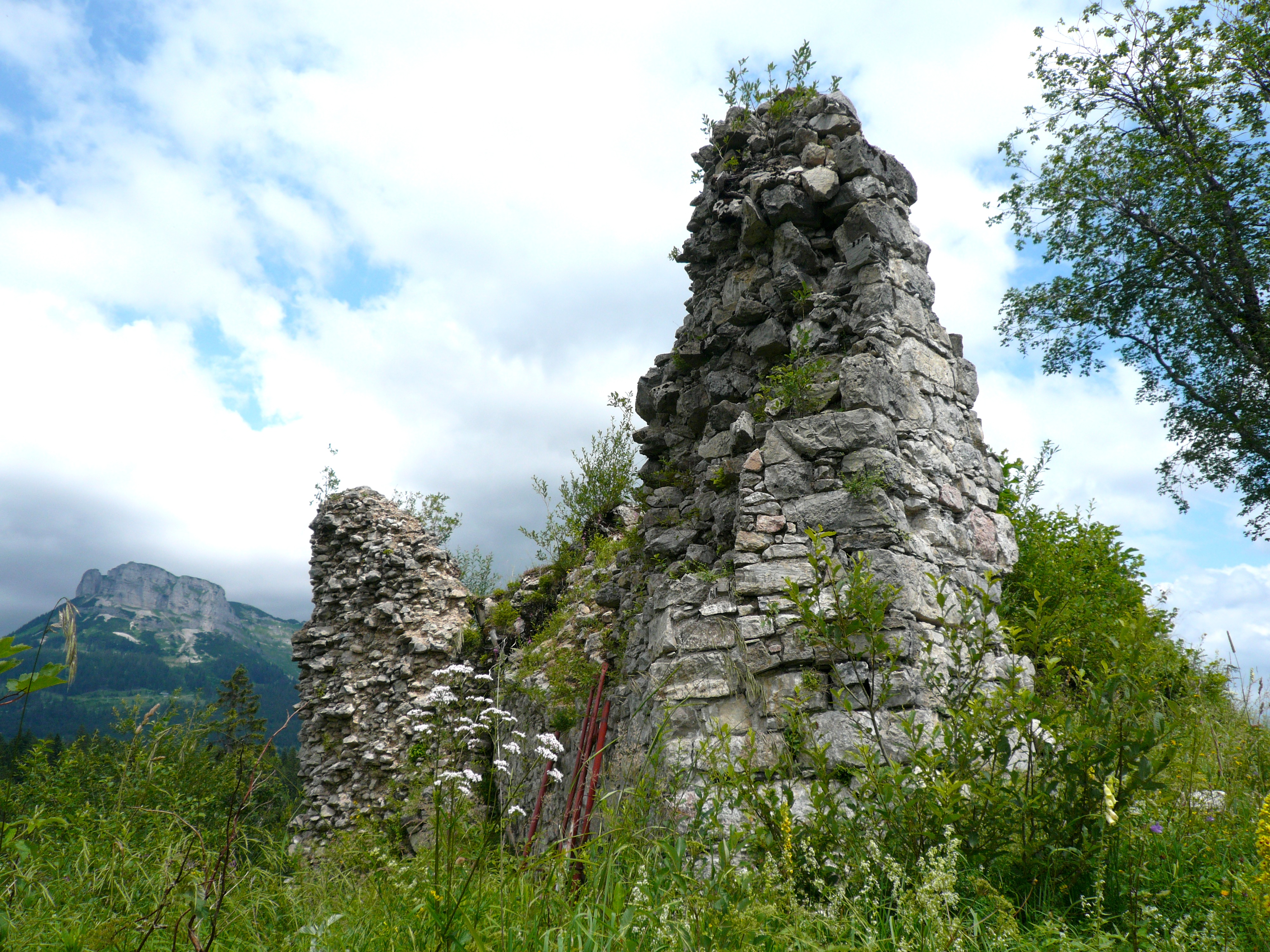
Pflindsberg Castle 2012

== See also ==
- List of castles in Austria
