= Loser (mountain) =

Mountain in Styria, Austria

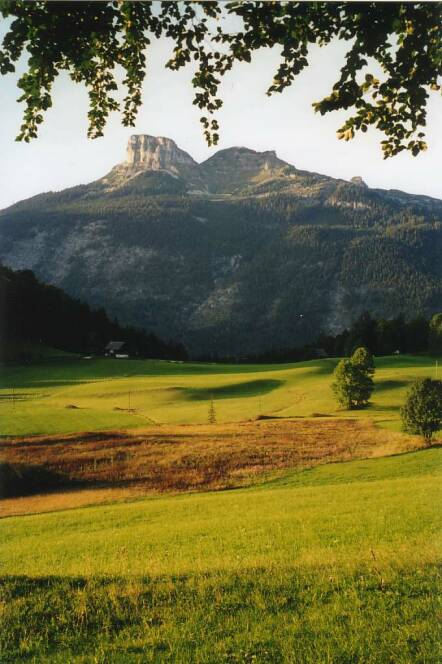

Highest point
- Elevation: 1,838 m (6,030 ft)
- Prominence: 408 m (1,339 ft)
- Coordinates: 47°40′N 13°46′E

Geography
- Location: Styria, Austria
- Parent range: Totes Gebirge

Climbing
- First ascent: 1800
- Easiest route: Loser Restaurant - Augstsee

Loser (German pronunciation: [ˈloːzə]) is the name of a mountain in the Ausseerland in Austria which has an elevation of 1,838 metres above sea level.

The mountain is the most prominent landmark of the Ausseerland. Among the locals, it is also known as the Ausseer Ohrwaschl (Aussee Ear) because of its shape. It is possible to almost reach the peak by car by using a toll road of 9 km. There is an extensive parking lot in front of the Loser Restaurant at an elevation of 1600 m, from where one can embark on various tours. The Augstsee (1643 m / 250 m × 100 m) is located close to the restaurant and is an attractive target for hiking which can be reached with just a little walking. From there onwards, one can reach the peak by passing the Loser-Fenster (Loser Window), a natural rock gate. One of the most important ski resorts of the Ausseerland is located on the Loser and spans about 1000 meters of elevation. During the descent, one passes a second gastronomic establishment, the Loserhütte at 1498 m.

== Loser Solar Plant ==
The largest solar power plant of the Alps is located on the southern slope of Loser at an elevation of 1600 metres. The pure air, the usual absence of fog, and, in winter, reflection of sunlight from snow, create good conditions for obtaining electricity from sunlight in the mountains. The Loser plant was built from 1988 to 1989 and consists of 598 solar modules covering a total surface area of 263 m^{2}. Its original architect Abdur-Rahman Rana, designed the module's inclination of 60 degrees allows for a stable delivery of electricity throughout the year. Three generators (from the USA, Japan and Germany) produce about 30 kilowatts under optimal conditions, which enter the electrical network through a power inverter.

== Gallery ==
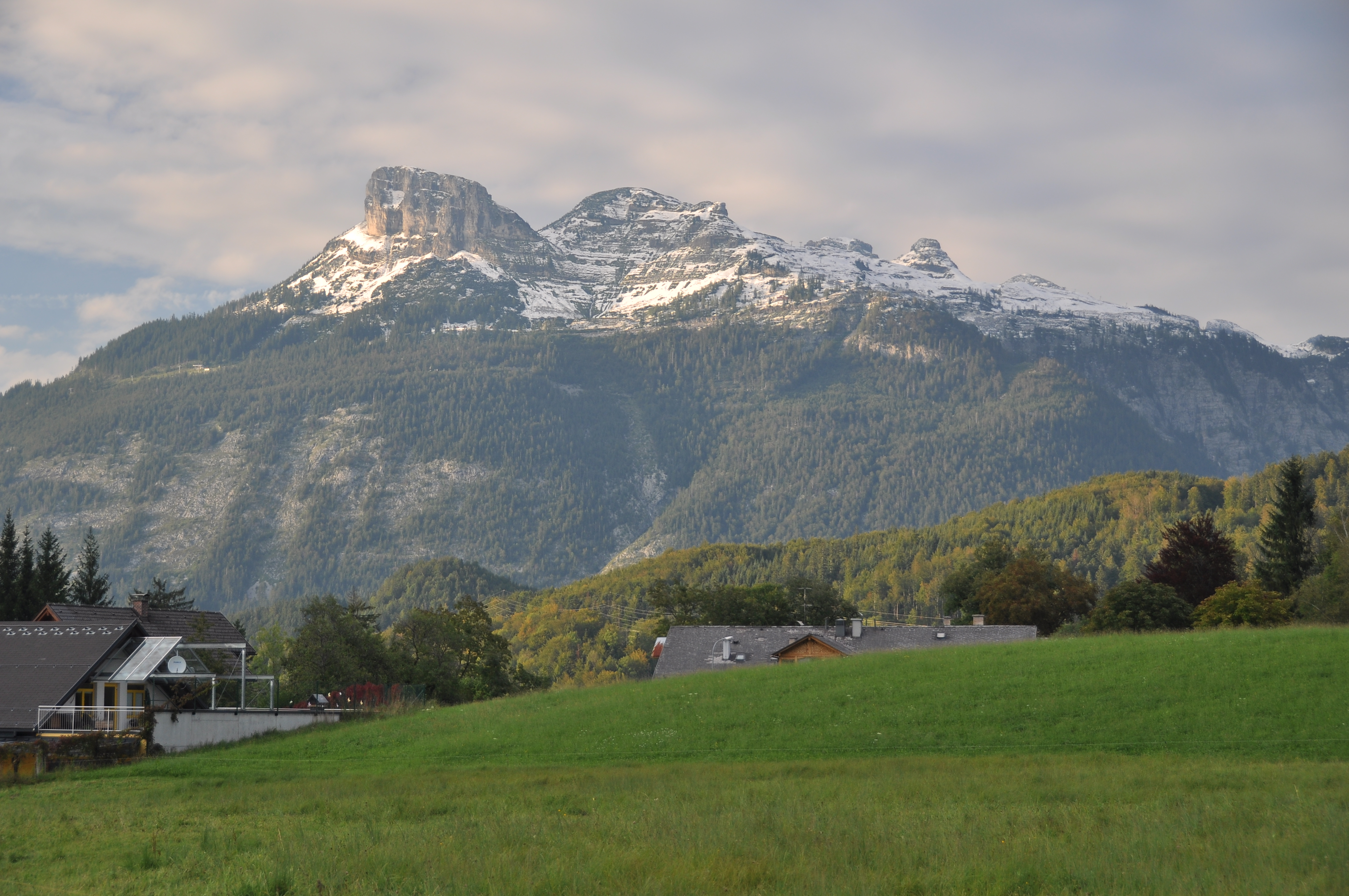
Loser mountain in September

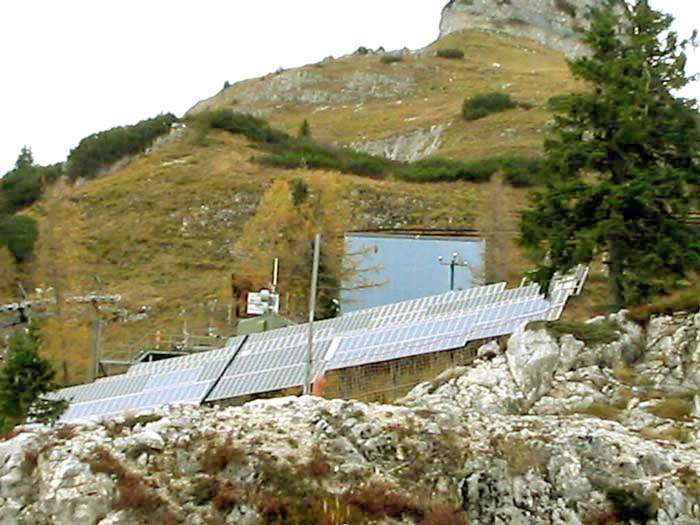
Loser Solar Power Plant

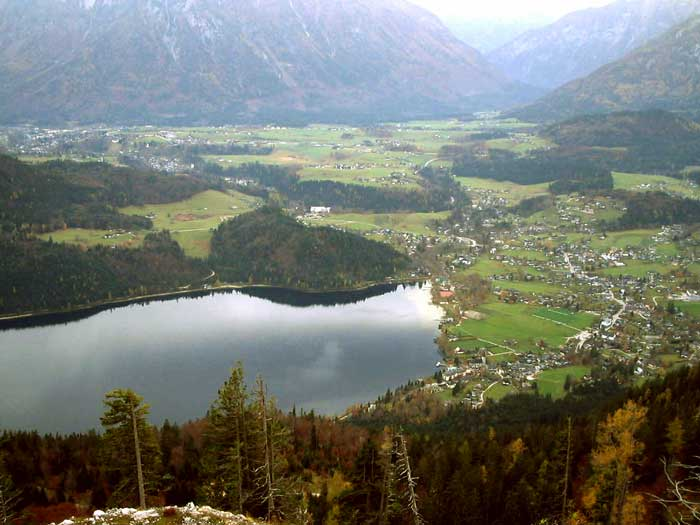
View on Altaussee / Altausseer See

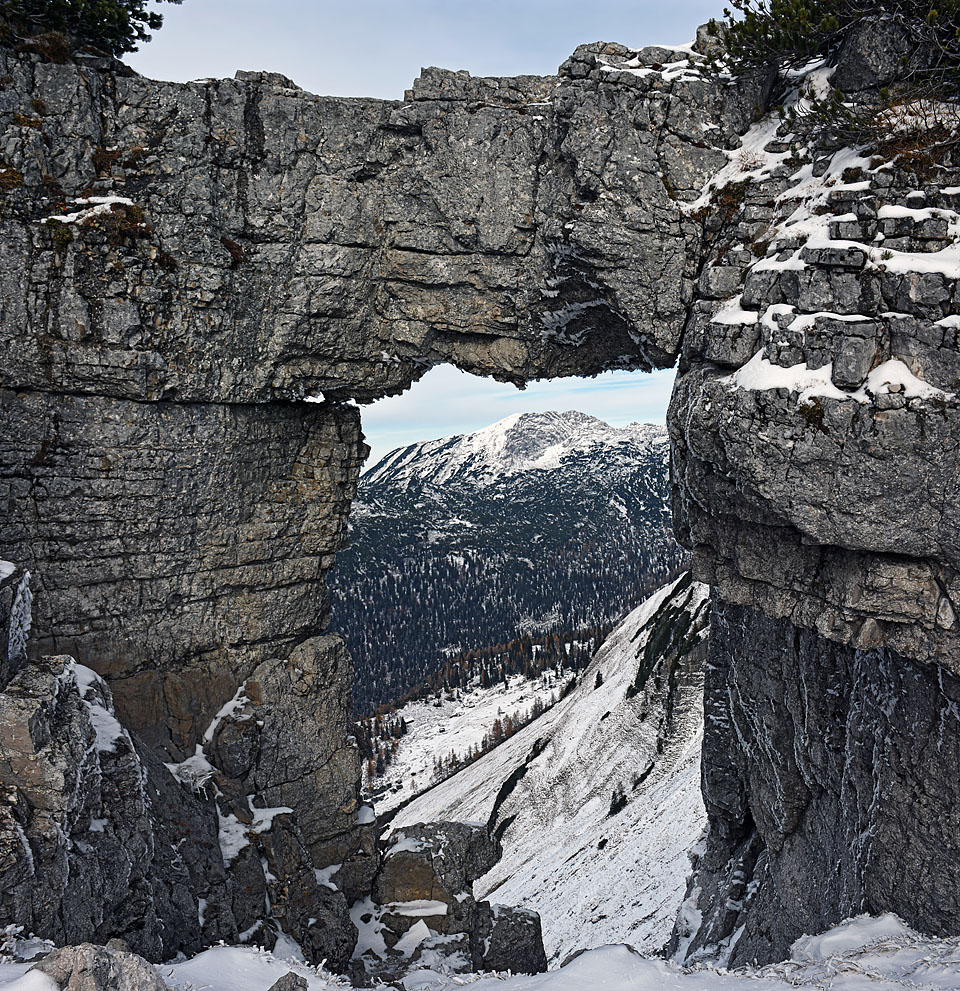
Loser rock window
