= Ebensee am Traunsee =

Ebensee am Traunsee Emsee
- Municipality
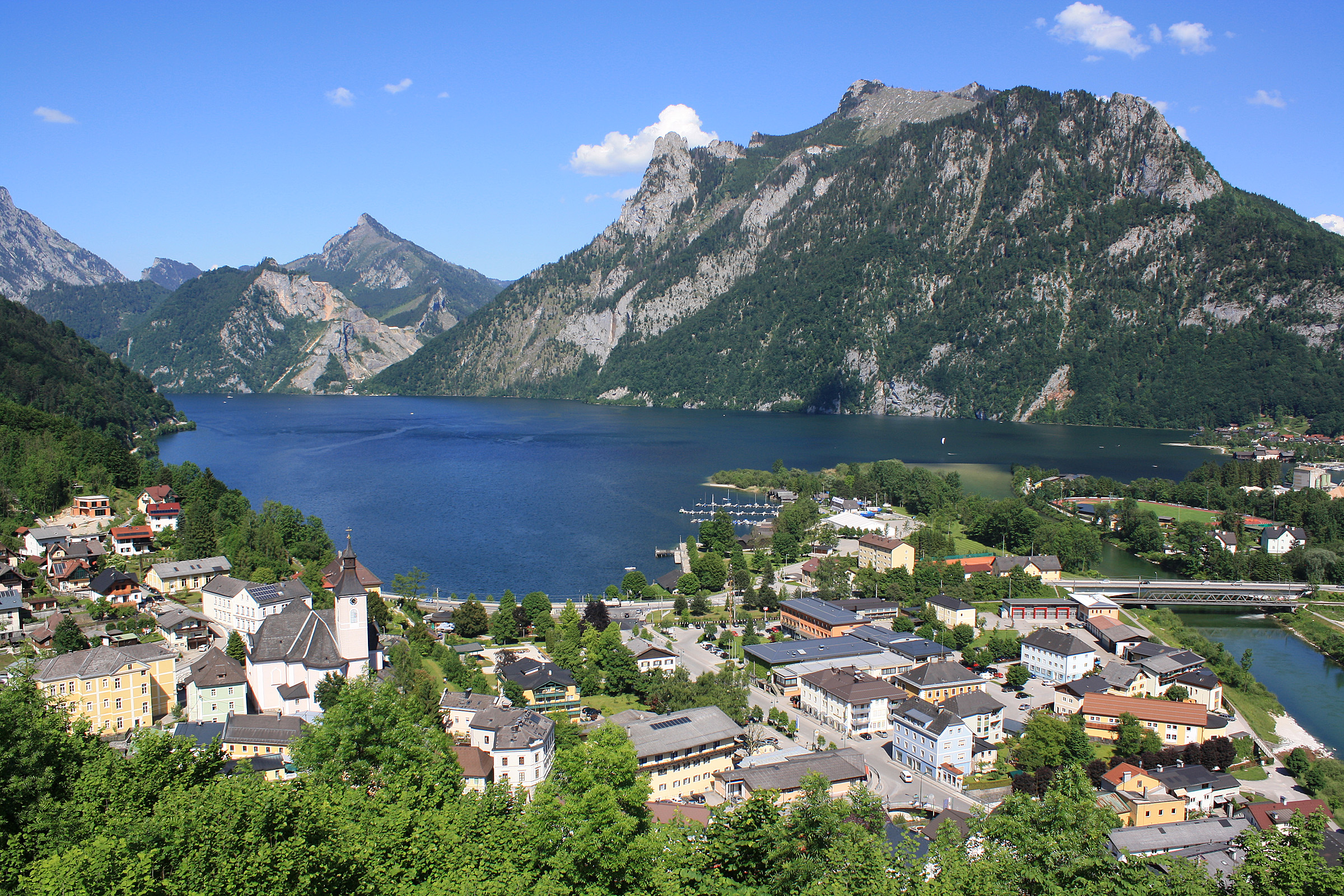

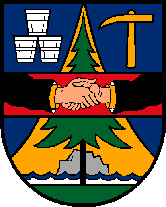
- Coat of arms

- Location within Austria
- Coordinates: 47°48′30″N 13°46′30″E
- Country: Austria
- State: Upper Austria
- District: Gmunden

Government
  - Mayor: Barbara Promberger (SPÖ)

Area
  - Total: 194.69 km^{2} (75.17 sq mi)
- Elevation: 443 m (1,453 ft)

Population (2018-01-01)
  - Total: 7,717
  - Density: 39.64/km^{2} (102.7/sq mi)
- Time zone: UTC+1 (CET)
  - Summer (DST): UTC+2 (CEST)
- Postal code: 4802
- Area code: 06133
- Vehicle registration: GM
- Website: www.ebensee.at

Ebensee am Traunsee (Austrian German: [ˈeːbn̩seː am ˈtraʊnseː]; Central Bavarian: Emsee) is a market town in the Traunviertel region of the Austrian state of Upper Austria, located within the Salzkammergut Mountains at the southern end of the Traunsee. The regional capital Linz lies approximately 90 km (56 mi) to the north, nearest towns are Gmunden and Bad Ischl. The municipality also comprises the Katastralgemeinden of Langwies, Oberlangbath, Rindbach, Kohlstatt and Roith.

== History ==
With the Traunviertel, Ebensee since 1180 belonged to the Duchy of Styria held by the House of Babenberg from 1192, until in 1254 King Ottokar II of Bohemia finally allocated it to his Austrian duchy. Ebensee itself was first mentioned in a 1447 deed.

From 1596 on Emperor Rudolf II had a salt evaporation pond erected near the settlement, supplied with brine being delivered via a 40 km (25 mi) long pipeline from the salt mines around Hallstatt. Ebensee therefore was the primary production centre for salt in Austria. Historically, the site was chosen because of the rich forests, whose wood was used to boil the salt out of the brine. In 1883 the Belgian chemist Ernest Solvay established soda works of the Solvay company at Ebensee. Although a former industrial center in the larger Salzkammergut region, it has recently fallen on bad fortunes with the closure of some of the larger factories.

=== Nazi concentration camp ===
In 1943, the SS established Ebensee concentration camp (codename "Zement") near the town, a planned emergency location for the Peenemünde research centre after the RAF Operation Hydra attack. It was part of the Mauthausen network. Slave laborers were worked to death digging tunnels for armaments storage. The camp was liberated by American soldiers in May 1945. Due to the extremely high death rates, Ebensee is considered one of the most horrific Nazi concentration camps.

Used as a Displaced Persons camp after the war, the area is today site of a memorial and a museum.

== Population ==
Historical population
Year	Pop.	±%
1951	10,327	—
1991	8,800	−14.8%
2001	8,451	−4.0%
2011	7,817	−7.5%
2021	7,597	−2.8%
2022	7,515	−1.1%

== Politics ==
Seats in the municipal assembly (Gemeinderat) as of 2021 elections:

- Social Democratic Party of Austria (SPÖ): 16
- Austrian People's Party (ÖVP): 6
- Citizens' List for Ebensee (BÜFE): 11
- Freedom Party of Austria (FPÖ): 4

== Tourism ==
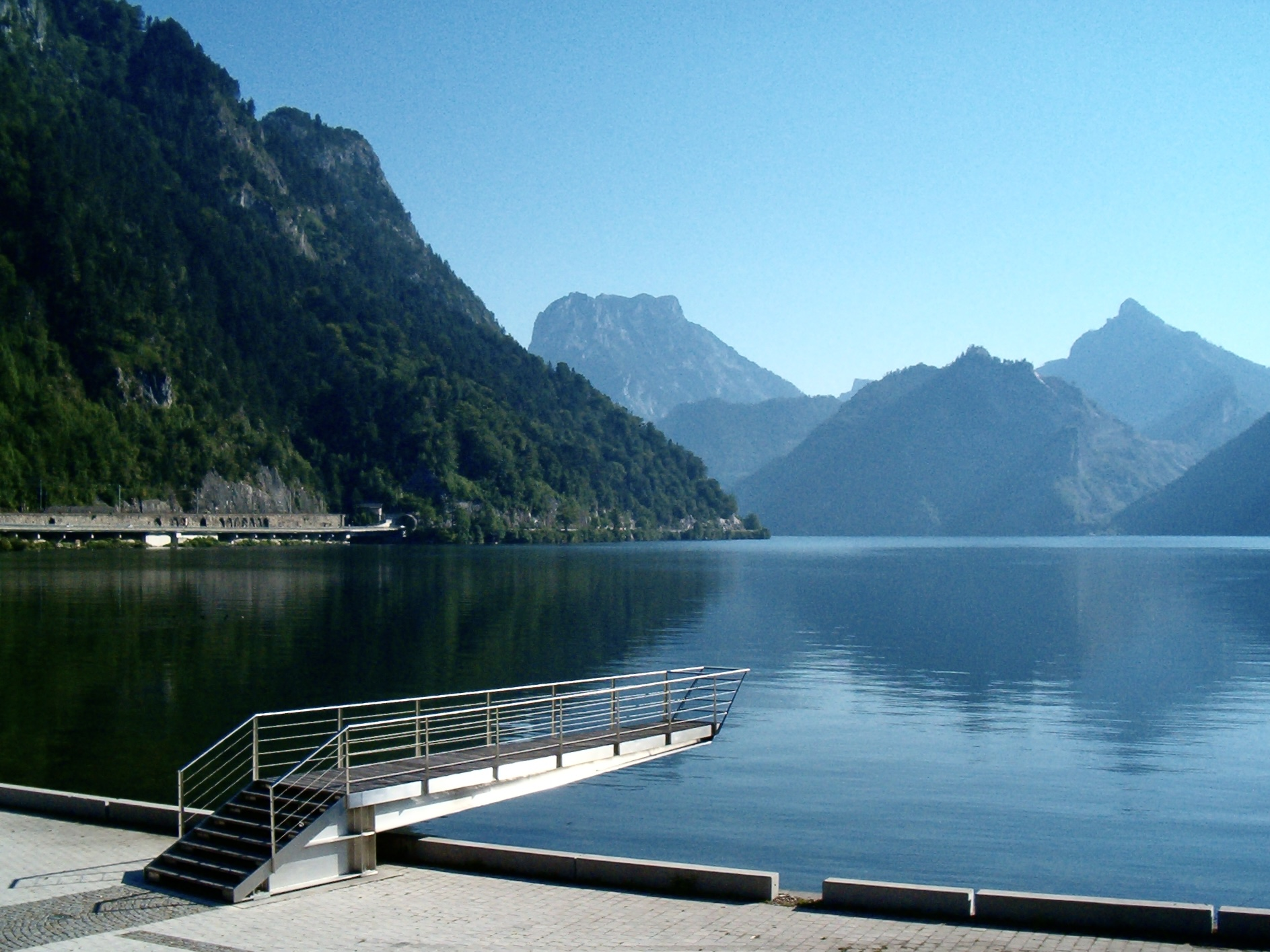
View of the Traunsee

Ebensee is surrounded by three picturesque lakes, the Traunsee, the Offensee and the Langbathsee. The Traunsee is large enough to be used for boating, while the other two lakes are smaller, surrounded by mountains and used only for bathing; both are protected natural areas. On the shore of the Langbathsee is a 19th-century hunting lodge erected at the behest of Emperor Franz Joseph I of Austria.

Since 1927 an aerial tramway built by the Bleichert engineering company runs up to the summit of the Feuerkogel mountain. Other tourist attractions include the Gasselhöhle show cave and a small skiing area with about ten lifts.

Parts of the 1968 Where Eagles Dare film were shot in the Ebensee area.

== Climate ==
Feuerkogel is a nearby mountain peak with a weather station on it.

Climate data for Feuerkogel: 1618m (1991−2020 normals)
Month	Jan	Feb	Mar	Apr	May	Jun	Jul	Aug	Sep	Oct	Nov	Dec	Year
Record high °C (°F)	13.4 (56.1)	14.5 (58.1)	14.5 (58.1)	19.4 (66.9)	24.0 (75.2)	26.8 (80.2)	28.0 (82.4)	26.3 (79.3)	23.4 (74.1)	22.7 (72.9)	20.2 (68.4)	15.7 (60.3)	28.0 (82.4)
Mean daily maximum °C (°F)	−0.1 (31.8)	−0.6 (30.9)	1.7 (35.1)	5.8 (42.4)	10.1 (50.2)	14.0 (57.2)	15.4 (59.7)	15.0 (59.0)	11.7 (53.1)	8.5 (47.3)	4.3 (39.7)	0.8 (33.4)	7.2 (45.0)
Daily mean °C (°F)	−2.8 (27.0)	−3.3 (26.1)	−1.0 (30.2)	2.8 (37.0)	7.2 (45.0)	10.7 (51.3)	12.5 (54.5)	12.8 (55.0)	8.8 (47.8)	5.9 (42.6)	1.6 (34.9)	−1.8 (28.8)	4.5 (40.0)
Mean daily minimum °C (°F)	−5.3 (22.5)	−6.4 (20.5)	−3.5 (25.7)	−0.1 (31.8)	3.9 (39.0)	7.4 (45.3)	8.9 (48.0)	9.1 (48.4)	6.0 (42.8)	2.9 (37.2)	−1.2 (29.8)	−4.3 (24.3)	1.5 (34.6)
Record low °C (°F)	−20.2 (−4.4)	−22.7 (−8.9)	−20.6 (−5.1)	−13.9 (7.0)	−6.1 (21.0)	−3.1 (26.4)	0.0 (32.0)	−0.9 (30.4)	−2.9 (26.8)	−12.5 (9.5)	−17.1 (1.2)	−22.6 (−8.7)	−22.7 (−8.9)
Average precipitation mm (inches)	138.2 (5.44)	110.9 (4.37)	151.2 (5.95)	105.2 (4.14)	171.6 (6.76)	201.7 (7.94)	230.8 (9.09)	202.8 (7.98)	175.6 (6.91)	130.2 (5.13)	126.3 (4.97)	144.7 (5.70)	1,889.2 (74.38)
Average snowfall cm (inches)	115.5 (45.5)	108.5 (42.7)	118.7 (46.7)	65.6 (25.8)	20.7 (8.1)	1.4 (0.6)	0.0 (0.0)	0.6 (0.2)	9.0 (3.5)	30.5 (12.0)	73.8 (29.1)	109.7 (43.2)	654 (257.4)
Average precipitation days (≥ 1.0 mm)	13.7	13.5	15.7	11.7	15.3	16.0	16.4	13.6	13.0	12.3	12.6	14.9	168.7
Average snowy days (≥ 1 cm)	30.8	28.3	30.9	27.6	11.4	0.7	0.0	0.1	2.1	7.9	18.1	28.8	186.7
Mean monthly sunshine hours	104.8	110.6	141.2	173.7	185.4	176.5	195.6	201.7	155.6	148.3	107.4	95.8	1,796.6
Source 1: Central Institute for Meteorology and Geodynamics
Source 2: NOAA(Sun)

== Twin towns – sister cities ==
Ebensee is twinned with:

- Prato, Italy, since 1987
- Zawiercie, Poland, since 2000

== Notable people ==
- Frederick Katzer (1844–1903), Bishop of Green Bay
