= Offensee =

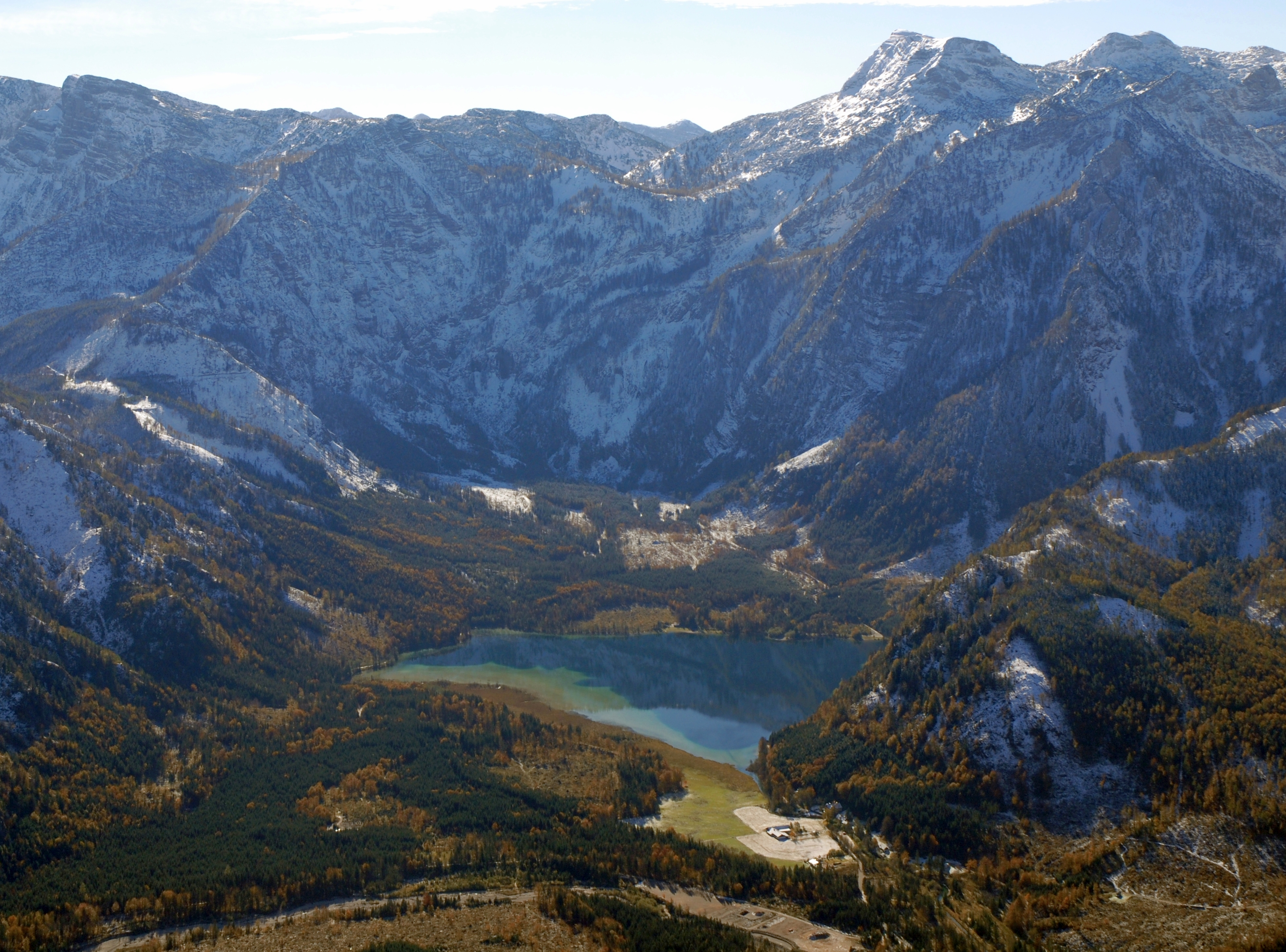
- Offensee

- Location within Austria
- Location: Upper Austria
- Coordinates: 47°45′N 13°50′E
- Type: lake

Offensee is a lake located at the western end of the Totes Gebirge mountain range in Upper Austria's part of the Salzkammergut.
