= Wildensee (Salzkammergut) =

Lake in the Salzkammergut, Styria, Austria

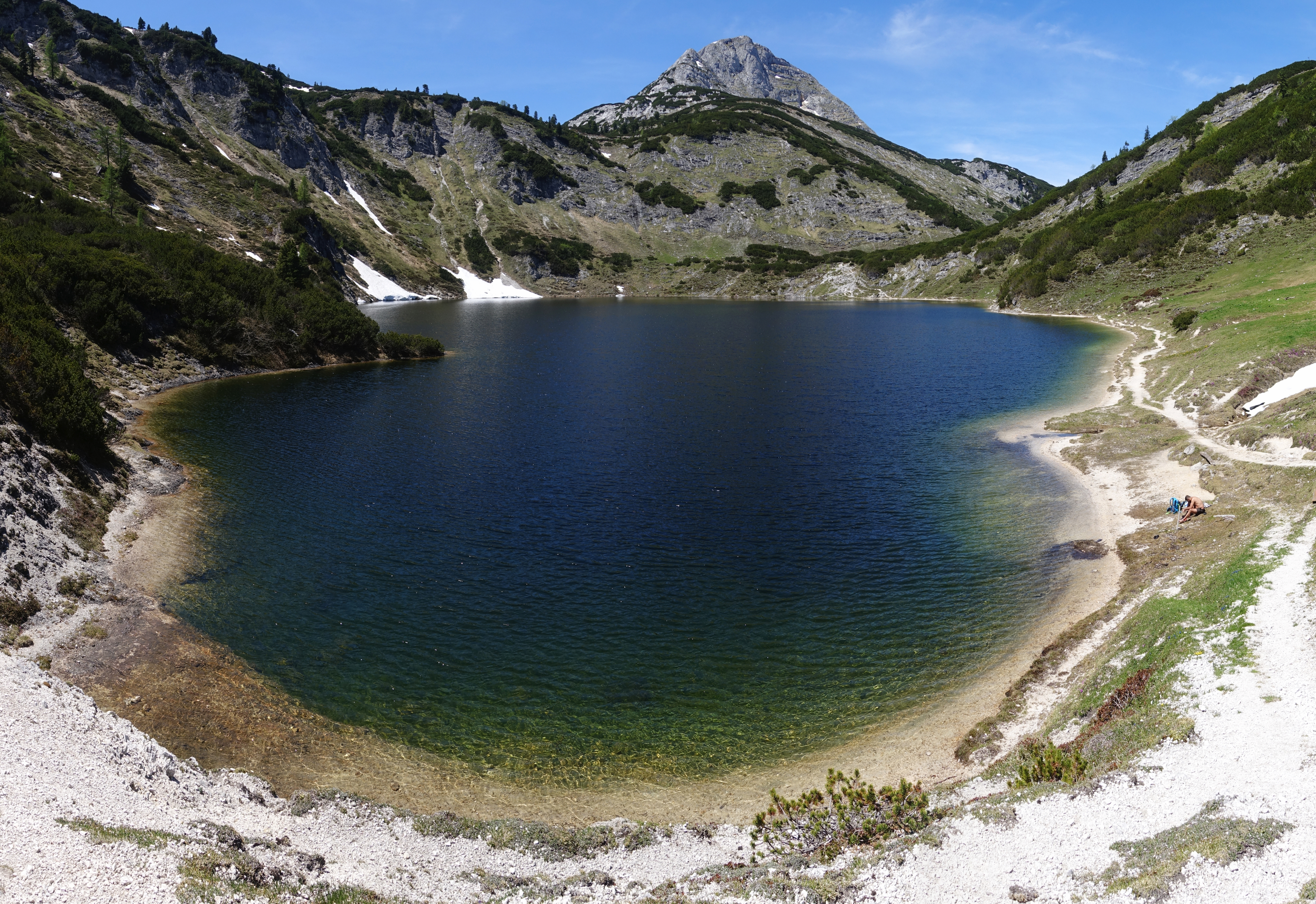

- Location within Styria
- Location: Salzkammergut
- Coordinates: 47°42′45″N 13°51′6″E
- Basin countries: Austria
- Surface elevation: 1,535 m (5,036 ft)

Wildensee is a lake in Styria in the Salzkammergut resort region. The lake is about 1,535 metres above sea level in the Totes Gebirge mountains.
