= Ernst Welisch =

Austrian playwright

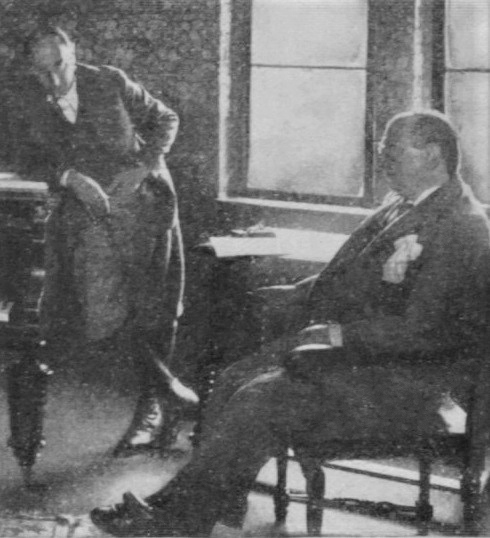
- Ernst Welisch (left) and Rudolf Schanzer (right) in Schanzer's villa at Bad Ischl, 1925
- Born: Ernst Friedrich Wilhelm Welisch; 27 February 1875; Vienna, Austria
- Died: 26 March 1941 (aged 66); Vienna, Austria
- Occupations: librettist; theatre director

Ernst Welisch (27 February 1875 – 26 March 1941) was an Austrian playwright and theatre director. He is primarily known for the numerous operetta librettos that he wrote for composers such as Leo Fall, Jean Gilbert, Emmerich Kálmán, and Ralph Benatzky. Welisch was born in Vienna, but spent most of his career in Berlin. In the 1930s he returned to Vienna where he died shortly before the premiere of his last work, Venedig in Wien.

== Life and career ==
Welisch was born in Vienna. He studied history and literature at the University of Vienna followed by studies in art history and archeology at the Ludwig-Maximilians-Universität München where he received his doctorate in 1898. In 1901, he published a book on the painters of Augsburg during the Baroque and Roccoco eras, but then turned his activity to the theatre. He had settled in Berlin in 1900 and from 1904 worked as a director and dramaturge in various Berlin theatres, beginning with the Lessing Theater. He went on to work at the Berliner Theater in 1905, the Neues Schauspielhaus where he was the head director from 1905 to 1911, and finally the Komödienhaus where he was the deputy head director from 1913 to 1922.

Welisch's parallel career as a librettist began in 1905 when he and Rudolf Bernauer co-wrote the libretto for Leo Fall's first operetta Der Rebell. During his career he wrote or co-wrote over 20 librettos for operettas and musical theatre works as well as two stage comedies. In the 1930s he returned to Vienna where he died at the age of 66. His final work was the libretto for the operetta Venedig in Wien composed by Rudi Gfaller. It premiered in Chemnitz on 29 March 1941, three days after Welisch's death. His son, Ernst Adolf Welisch (1915–?), likewise became a playwright and director and also wrote several screenplays for German-language films in the 1940s and 50s.

== Librettos ==
Librettos written or co-written by Welisch include:

- Der Rebell (with Rudolf Bernauer), operetta in 3 acts composed by Leo Fall; premiered Vienna, Theater an der Wien 29 November 1905. A failure at its premiere, it was greatly revised as Der liebe Augustin which premiered in Berlin at the Neues Theater am Zoo on 3 February 1912.
- Die Frau im Hermelin (with Rudolf Schanzer), operetta in 3 acts composed by Jean Gilbert; premiered Berlin, Theater des Westens, 22 August 1919
- Der Geiger von Lugano (with Rudolf Schanzer), operetta in 3 acts composed by Jean Gilbert; premiered Berlin, Thalia Theater, 26 September 1920
- Die Braut des Lucullus (with Rudolf Schanzer), operetta in 3 acts composed by Jean Gilbert; premiered Berlin, Theater des Westens, 26 August 1921
- Madame Pompadour (with Rudolf Schanzer), operetta in 3 acts composed by Leo Fall; premiered Berlin, Berliner Theater; 9 September 1922
- Riquette (with Rudolf Schanzer), operetta in 3 acts composed by Oscar Straus; premiered Berlin, Deutsches Künstlertheater, 17 January 1925
- Die Teresina (with Rudolf Schanzer), operetta in 3 acts, composed by Oscar Straus; premiered Berlin, Deutsches Künstlertheater, 11 September 1925
- Das Spiel um die Liebe (with Rudolf Schanzer), operetta in 3 acts composed by Jean Gilbert; premiered Berlin, Theater des Westens, 19 December 1925
- Eine Frau von Format (with Rudolf Schanzer), operetta in 3 acts composed by Michael Krausz; premiered Berlin, Theater des Westens, 21 September 1927
- Casanova (with Rudolf Schanzer), operetta in 3 acts composed by Ralph Benatzky; premiered Berlin, Großes Schauspielhaus, 1 September 1928
- Die drei Musketiere (with Rudolf Schanzer), operetta in 3 acts composed by Ralph Benatzky; premiered Berlin, Großes Schauspielhaus, 31 August 1929
- Die erste Beste (with Rudolf Schanzer), operetta in 3 acts, composed by Oscar Straus; premiered Prague, Neues Deutsches Theater, 19 October 1929
- Das Mädel am Steuer (with Rudolf Schanzer), musical comedy in 3 acts composed by Jean Gilbert; premiered Berlin, Komische Oper, 17 September 1930
- Der Teufelsreiter (with Rudolf Schanzer), operetta in 3 acts composed by Emmerich Kálmán; premiered Vienna, Theater an der Wien, 10 March 1932
- Die Sacher-Pepi (originally titled Die Gräfin bitteschön), operetta in 3 acts, composed by Rudi Gfaller; premiered Leipzig, Neues Operetten-Theater, 16 September 1939
- Venedig in Wien, operetta in 3 acts, composed by Rudi Gfaller; premiered Chemnitz, Central-Theater, 29 March 1941
- Die himmelblaue Stadt (with Ernst Friese), operetta in 3 acts, composed by Rudi Gfaller; premiered Ostrava, Mährisch-Schlesisches Theater, 1944

== Filmography ==
- The Lady in Ermine, directed by James Flood (1927, based on the operetta Die Frau im Hermelin)
- Madame Pompadour, directed by Herbert Wilcox (UK, 1927, based on the operetta Madame Pompadour)
- A Woman with Style, directed by Fritz Wendhausen (Germany, 1928, based on the operetta Eine Frau von Format)
- Bride of the Regiment, directed by John Francis Dillon (1930, based on the operetta Die Frau im Hermelin)
- That Lady in Ermine, directed by Ernst Lubitsch (1948, based on the operetta Die Frau im Hermelin)
- Madame Pompadour, directed by Eugen York (West Germany, 1974, TV film, based on the operetta Madame Pompadour)
