= Rudolf Schanzer =

Austrian playwright and journalist

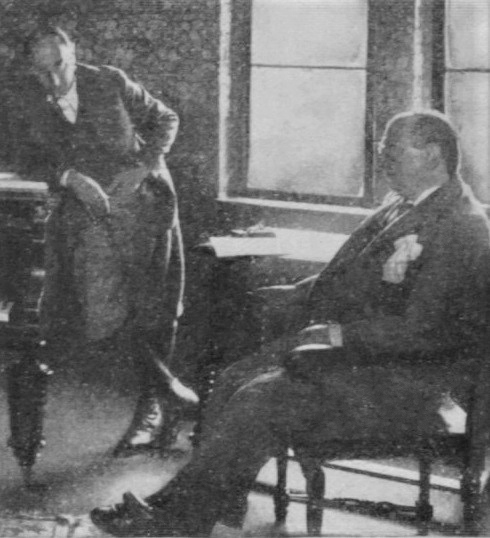
- Ernst Welisch (left) and Rudolf Schanzer (right) in Schanzer's villa at Bad Ischl, 1925
- Born: Rudolf Moritz Schanzer; 12 January 1875; Vienna, Austria
- Died: 1944; Italy
- Occupations: librettist; journalist

Rudolf (or Rudolph) Schanzer (12 January 1875 – 1944) was an Austrian playwright and journalist. He is primarily known for the numerous operetta librettos that he wrote for composers such as Leo Fall, Jean Gilbert, Emmerich Kálmán, and Ralph Benatzky. He was born in Vienna and died in Italy where he committed suicide after his arrest by the Gestapo.

== Life and career ==
Schanzer was born into a Jewish family in Vienna where his father worked as a shipping agent. From 1894 to 1895 he studied law at the University of Vienna and then went to Paris where he worked as a private secretary and journalist. After Paris, he settled in Berlin working there as a journalist, critic, and editor for the Berliner Zeitung am Mittag. He also began writing theatrical pieces in his spare time. Some of his earliest works were for pantomimes and cabaret and variety shows. He then began collaborating on operetta librettos with his friends and fellow writers Rudolf Bernauer and Ernst Welisch. Their success led him to becoming a full-time librettist.

During the course of his career he would write or co-write over 30 operetta and musical theatre librettos, many of which were later made into films. With the rise of Nazi Germany and the enactment of the antisemitic Nuremberg Laws in 1935, Schanzer left Berlin and moved to his villa in the Austrian spa town of Bad Ischl. He returned to Vienna in 1936, but following the German annexation of Austria in 1938, he fled to Abbazia, a town now in Croatia but then under Italian control. He tried to emigrate to the US or England but was unsuccessful. Schanzer was arrested by the Gestapo in 1944 and was to be deported to a concentration camp. He committed suicide while in custody by taking the poison which he had always carried with him after his flight from Austria.

== Librettos ==
Librettos written or co-written by Schanzer include:

- Der schwarze Mann, comic opera in 1 act composed by Oscar Straus; premiered Berlin, Secessionstheater, 23 December 1901
- Lord Piccolo (with Carl Lindau), operetta in 2 acts composed by Henri Berény; premiered Vienna, Johann Strauss Theater, 9 January 1910
- Filmzauber (with Rudolf Bernauer), Posse mit Gesang in 4 acts composed by Walter Kollo; premiered Berlin, Berliner Theater, 19 October 1912
- Wie einst im Mai (with Rudolf Bernauer), operetta in 4 acts composed by Walter Kollo; premiered Berlin, Berliner Theater, 4 October 1913
- Die tolle Komtess (with Rudolf Bernuauer), operetta in 3 acts composed by Walter Kollo; premiered Berlin, Berliner Theater, 21 February 1917
- Blitzblaues Blut (with Rudolf Bernauer), operetta in 3 acts composed by Walter Kollo; premiered Berlin, Berliner Theater, 9 February 1918
- Sterne, die wieder leuchten (with Rudolf Bernauer), operetta in 3 acts composed by Walter Kollo; premiered Berlin, Berliner Theater, 6 September 1918
- Die Frau im Hermelin (with Ernst Welisch), operetta in 3 acts composed by Jean Gilbert; premiered Berlin, Theater des Westens, 22 August 1919
- Der Geiger von Lugano (with Ernst Welisch ), operetta in 3 acts composed by Jean Gilbert; premiered Berlin, Thalia Theater, 26 September 1920
- Die Braut des Lucullus (with Ernst Welisch ), operetta in 3 acts composed by Jean Gilbert; premiered Berlin, Theater des Westens, 26 August 1921
- Madame Pompadour (with Ernst Welisch ), operetta in 3 acts composed by Leo Fall; premiered Berlin, Berliner Theater, 9 September 1922
- Riquette (with Ernst Welisch), operetta in 3 acts composed by Oscar Straus; premiered Berlin, Deutsches Künstlertheater, 17 January 1925
- Die Teresina (with Ernst Welisch), operetta in 3 acts, composed by Oscar Straus; premiered Berlin, Deutsches Künstlertheater, 11 September 1925
- Das Spiel um die Liebe (with Ernst Welisch), operetta in 3 acts composed by Jean Gilbert; premiered Berlin, Theater des Westens, 19 December 1925
- Eine Frau von Format (with Ernst Welisch), operetta in 3 acts composed by Michael Krausz; premiered Berlin, Theater des Westens, 21 September 1927
- Casanova (with Ernst Welisch ), operetta in 3 acts composed by Ralph Benatzky; premiered Berlin, Großes Schauspielhaus, 1 September 1928
- Die drei Musketiere (with Ernst Welisch), operetta in 3 acts composed by Ralph Benatzky; premiered Berlin, Großes Schauspielhaus, 31 August 1929
- Die erste Beste (with Ernst Welisch), operetta in 3 acts, composed by Oscar Straus; premiered Prague, Neues Deutsches Theater, 19 October 1929
- Das Mädel am Steuer (with Ernst Welisch), musical comedy in 3 acts composed by Jean Gilbert; premiered Berlin, Komische Oper, 17 September 1930
- Der Teufelsreiter (with Ernst Welisch), operetta in 3 acts composed by Emmerich Kálmán; premiered Vienna, Theater an der Wien, 10 March 1932

== Filmography ==
- Maytime, directed by Louis J. Gasnier (1923, based on the operetta Wie einst im Mai)
- Maytime, directed by Willi Wolff (Germany, 1926, based on the operetta Wie einst im Mai)
- The Lady in Ermine, directed by James Flood (1927, based on the operetta Die Frau im Hermelin)
- Madame Pompadour, directed by Herbert Wilcox (UK, 1927, based on the operetta Madame Pompadour)
- Princess Olala, directed by Robert Land (Germany, 1928, based on the operetta Prinzessin Olala)
- A Woman with Style, directed by Fritz Wendhausen (Germany, 1928, based on the operetta Eine Frau von Format)
- The Crazy Countess, directed by Richard Löwenbein (Germany, 1928, based on the operetta Die tolle Komtess)
- Bride of the Regiment, directed by John Francis Dillon (1930, based on the operetta Die Frau im Hermelin)
- (The 1937 film Maytime is not based on Rudolf Schanzer's play)
- That Lady in Ermine, directed by Ernst Lubitsch (1948, based on the operetta Die Frau im Hermelin)
- Wie einst im Mai, directed by Thomas Engel (West Germany, 1961, TV film, based on the operetta Wie einst im Mai)
- Madame Pompadour, directed by Eugen York (West Germany, 1974, TV film, based on the operetta Madame Pompadour)
