= Mikulášovice =

- Town
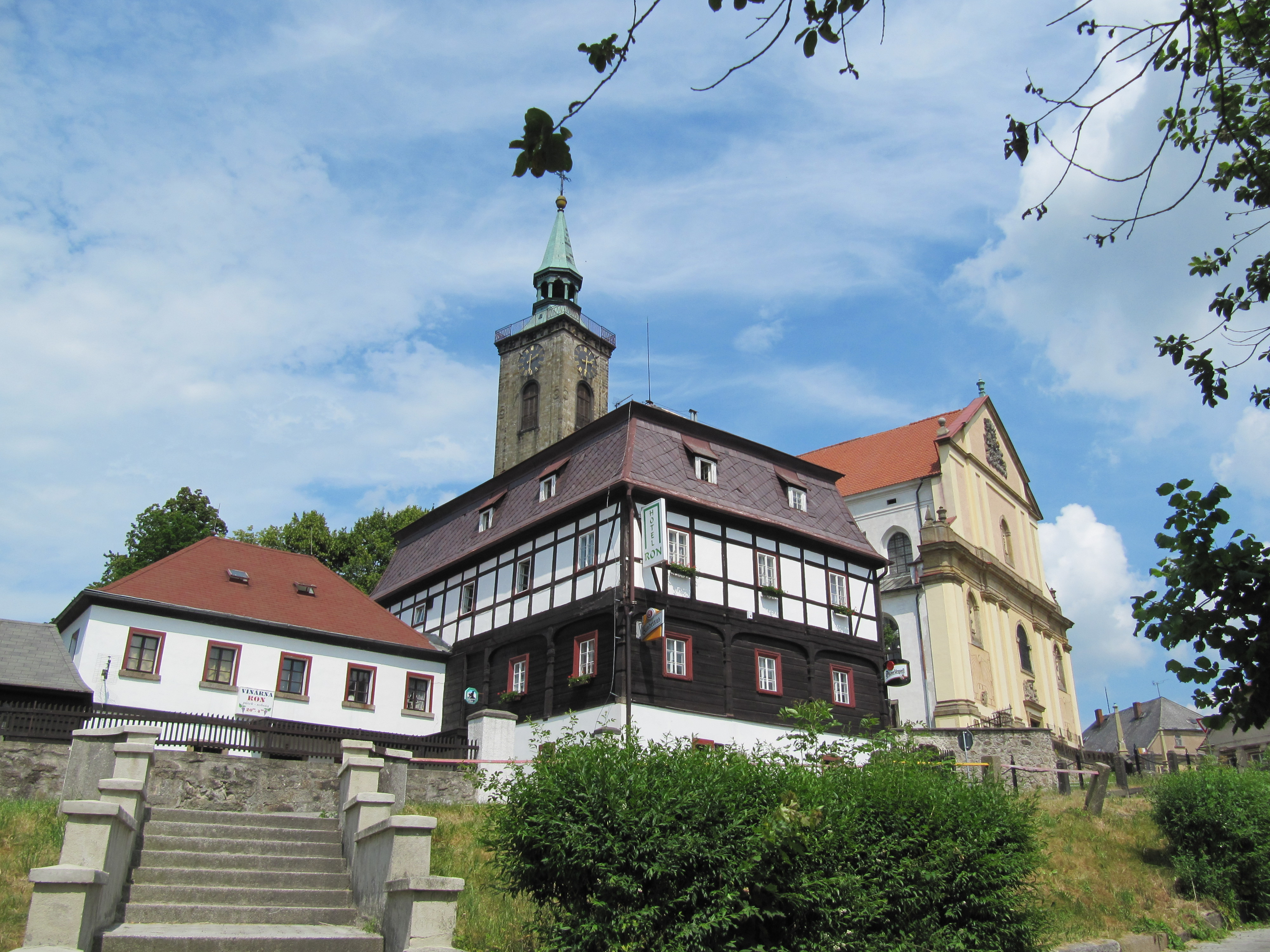
- Church of Saint Nicholas

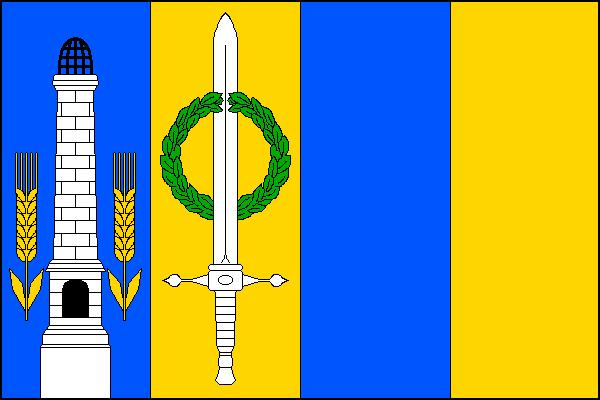
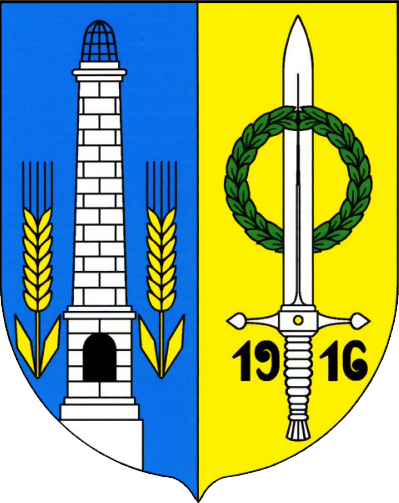
- Flag Coat of arms

- Location in the Czech Republic
- Coordinates: 50°57′56″N 14°21′28″E
- Country: Czech Republic
- Region: Ústí nad Labem
- District: Děčín
- First mentioned: 1449

Government
  - Mayor: Aleš Jandus

Area
  - Total: 25.85 km^{2} (9.98 sq mi)
- Elevation: 414 m (1,358 ft)

Population (2026-01-01)
  - Total: 2,060
  - Density: 79.7/km^{2} (206/sq mi)
- Time zone: UTC+1 (CET)
  - Summer (DST): UTC+2 (CEST)
- Postal code: 407 79
- Website: www.mikulasovice.cz

Mikulášovice (Czech pronunciation: [ˈmɪkulaːʃovɪtsɛ]; German: Nixdorf) is a town in Děčín District in the Ústí nad Labem Region of the Czech Republic. It has about 2,100 inhabitants.

== Administrative division ==
Mikulášovice consists of four municipal parts (in brackets population according to the 2021 census):

- Mikulášovice (1,890)
- Mikulášovičky (71)
- Salmov (28)
- Tomášov (9)

== Etymology ==
The initial German name of Mikulášovice was Nickelsdorff, meaning "Nickel's village". Nickel was a shortened form of the Latin name Nicolaus (and German Nicolas). The Czech name is a translation of the German name, derived from the Czech equivalent of Nicolaus, which is Mikuláš. The Czech name Mikulášovice first appeared in 1544.

== Geography ==
Mikulášovice is located about 23 kilometres (14 mi) northeast of Děčín and 40 km (25 mi) northeast of Ústí nad Labem. It lies in the salient region of Šluknov Hook, on the border with Germany, adjacent to the municipal territory of Sebnitz.

Mikulášovice lies in the Lusatian Highlands. The highest point is the mountain Tanečnice at 598 m (1,962 ft) above sea level. The town is situated in the elongated valley of the stream Mikulášovický potok.

== History ==
The first written mention of Mikulášovice is from 1446. The village was founded in the 12th century. In the 18th century, it was already an industrial municipality with tradition in knives sharpening. In 1794, the production of knives began.

From 1938 to 1945, Mikulášovice was occupied by Germany, before it was liberated by Polish soldiers in May 1945 and restored to Czechoslovakia. In the final stages of World War II, in May 1945, the prisoners of the AL Bautzen subcamp of the Gross-Rosen concentration camp, evacuated from Bautzen to Mikulášovice by the Germans, were liberated there by Polish soldiers.

== Demographics ==
Historical population

Year	Pop.	±%
1869	5,787	—
1880	6,449	+11.4%
1890	6,704	+4.0%
1900	7,109	+6.0%
1910	7,665	+7.8%

Year	Pop.	±%
1921	6,640	−13.4%
1930	6,755	+1.7%
1950	3,044	−54.9%
1961	2,741	−10.0%
1970	2,631	−4.0%

Year	Pop.	±%
1980	2,747	+4.4%
1991	2,546	−7.3%
2001	2,397	−5.9%
2011	2,151	−10.3%
2021	1,998	−7.1%

Source: Censuses

== Economy ==
The company Mikov, producing the popular knife Rybička, has its seat in Mikulášovice.

== Transport ==
The town is served by three train stations. The station Mikulášovice dolní nádraží on the railway line Děčín–Rumburk is located just behind the municipal border. The stations Mikulášovice horní nádraží and Mikulášovice střed are on the line Rumburk–Mikulášovice dolní nádraží, but trains run on it only on weekends and holidays during the summer season.

== Sights ==
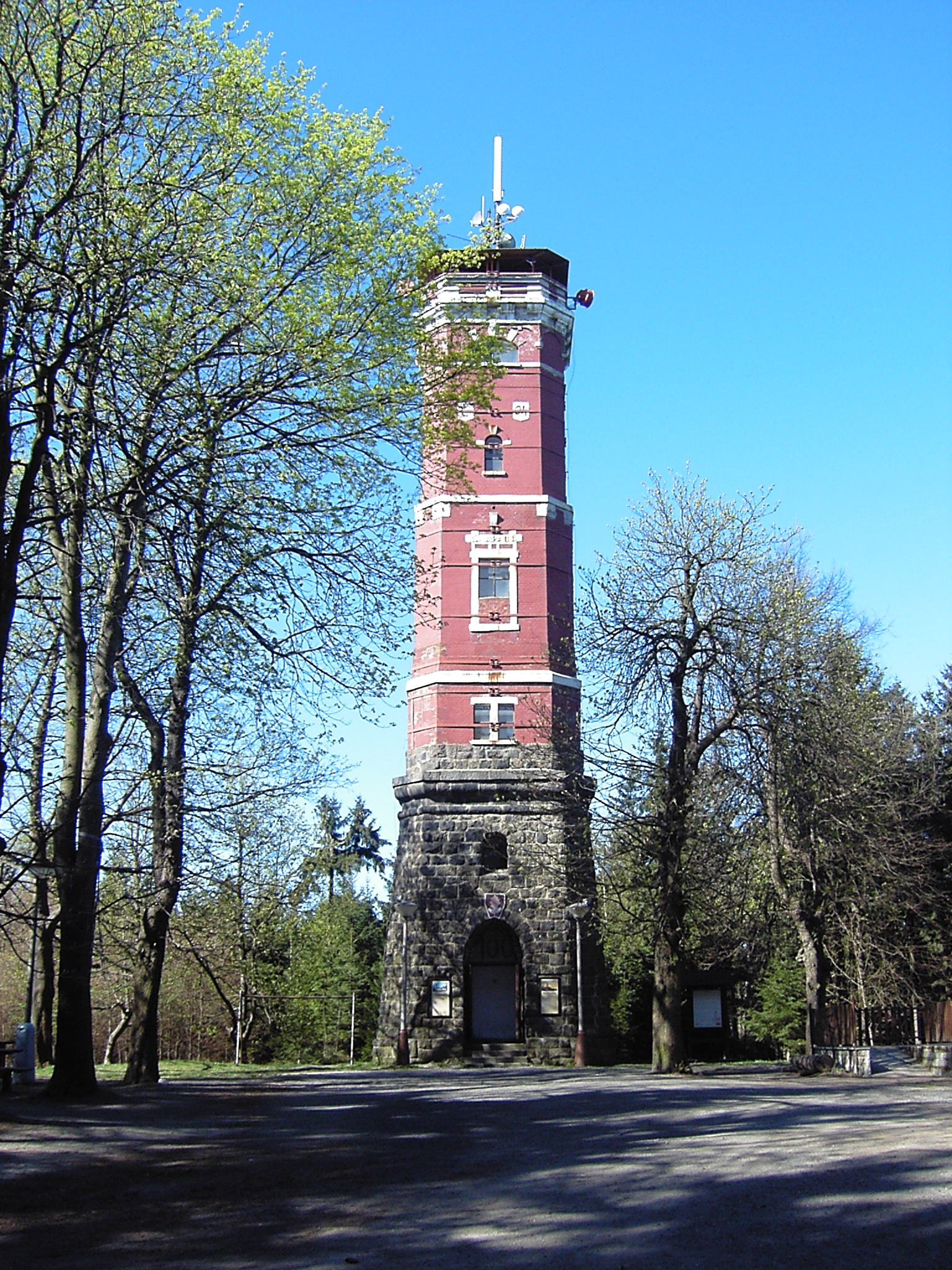
Observation tower on Tanečnice

The main landmark of Mikulášovice is the Church of Saint Nicholas. It was built in the late Baroque style in 1750–1751.

On the hill Tanečnice is an eponymous observation tower. The first wooden observation tower was built here in 1885. The current stone tower dates from 1905. It is 26 m (85 ft) high.

== Notable people ==
- Franz Dittrich (1815–1859), pathologist
- Anni Frind (1900–1987), opera singer

== Gallery ==
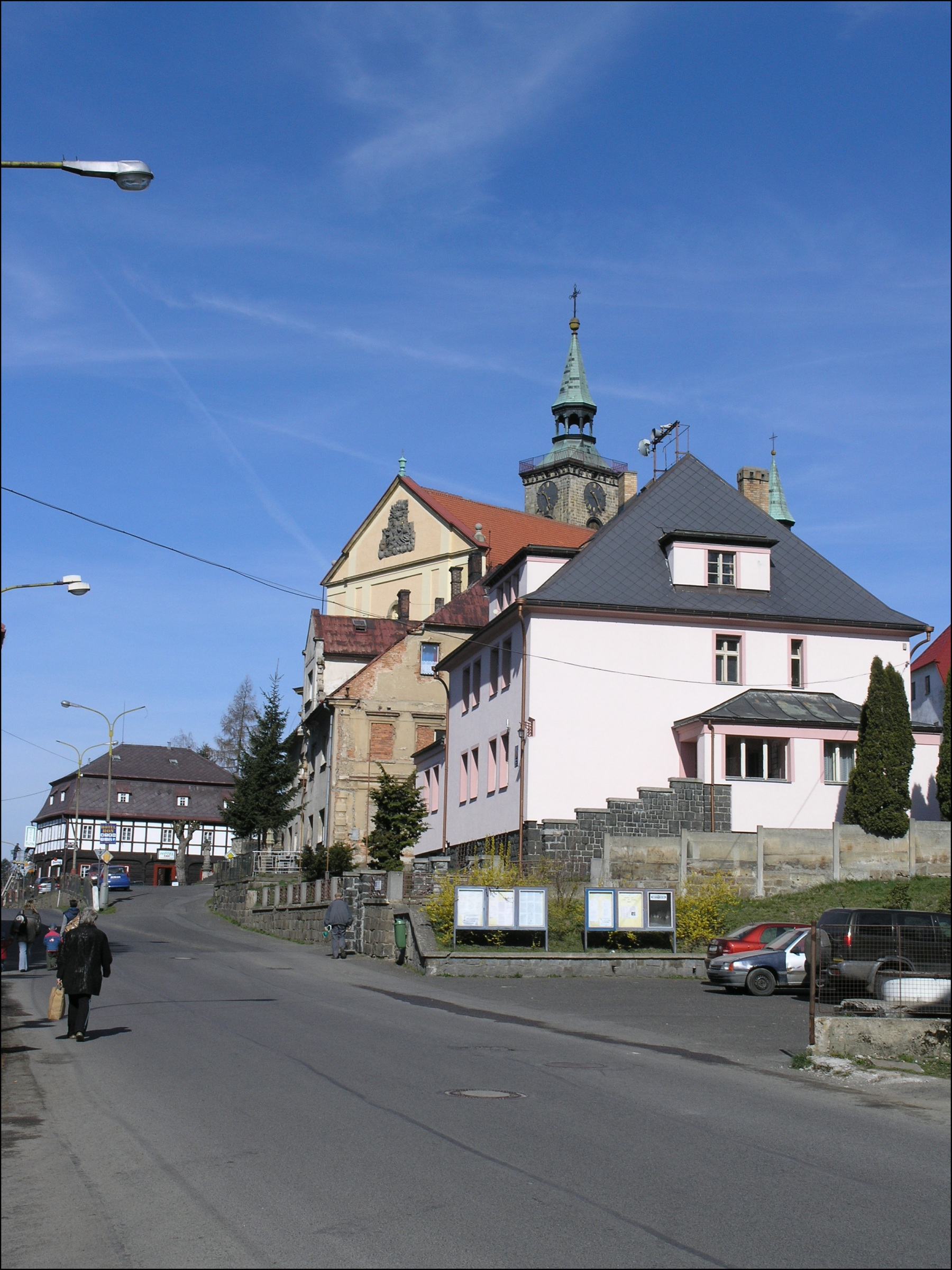
Town hall and Church of Saint Nicholas

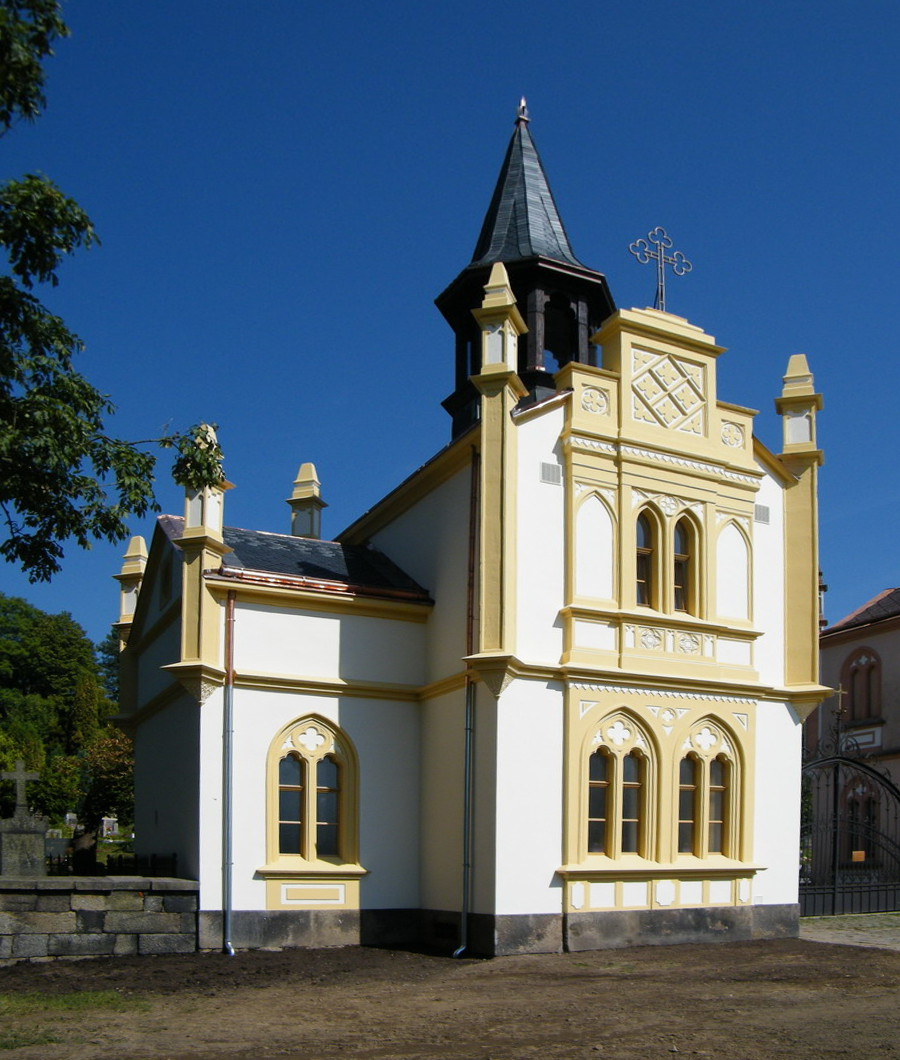
Church of the Ascension of Jesus
