= Allan Prior (tenor) =

Australian singer (1897–1949)

Allan Prior, also known as Allan Priora and born Allan Lonergan, (16 September 1897 – 24 June 1949) was an Australian tenor who starred in light operas and musicals. He began his career as a child actor in Australia at the age of 12. He trained as a tenor at the Milan Conservatory and then appeared in Australian theaters from 1918 until 1922. He performed regularly on Broadway from 1923 until 1929, briefly leaving New York in 1926 to star as Prince Karl in the original West End production of The Student Prince. He starred as Count Adrian Beltrami in the 1930 musical film Bride of the Regiment. He was married to American actress Dorothy Janis in the 1920s.

== Life and career ==
The son of James Lonergan and his wife Louis Lonergan (née Dennis), Allan William Lonergan was born 16 September 1897 in Wagga Wagga, New South Wales. His father was a blacksmith and an alcoholic who was physically abusive towards his mother. She petitioned for a divorce in 1909. Around this same time he made his stage debut at the age of twelve at the Tivoli Theatre in Sydney which was then managed by Harry Rickards. He adopted the surname Priora after his mother married the Italian-Australian Ernesto Priora in 1914. He went to Italy where he studied singing at the Milan Conservatory.

In 1918 he performed in The Courtiers in Australia, and in 1919 he performed at the Bijou Theatre, Melbourne. He starred in a Christmas pantomime at Her Majesty's Theatre, Melbourne, in December 1919. In 1920 he performed in The Sparklers as a member of Harry Borradale's Costume Comedy Company at the Victoria Theatre, Newcastle and the Palace Gardens Theatre in Brisbane. In 1921 he performed at the Strand Theatre, Toowoomba, and the Palace Theatre in Hobart, Tasmania. That same year he starred as the Captain in Rudolf Friml's The Firefly at Her Majesty's Theatre, Sydney. He successfully toured Australia with his own theatre company in 1922. He gained the moniker "The Australian Caruso".

In the United States, Lonergan performed on the Broadway stage as Allan Prior from 1923 until 1929. He made his Broadway debut in the musical revue Topics of 1923 at the Broadhurst Theatre. Songs he sang in this revue included two songs by Jean Schwartz and Harold Atteridge: "The Flowers of Evil" and "When You Love". He played Sir Gawaine in The Passing Show of 1924 at the Winter Garden Theatre. He portrayed composer Jacques Offenbach in the biographical musical The Love Song which was loosely based on Offenbach's life at the Century Theatre in 1925. His other Broadway credits included Carl in Katja (1926), Capt. James Wynnegate in White Eagle (1927), Harry Stanton in Rainbow (1928), and Jim Brent in Great Day! (1929).

Prior portrayed Prince Karl in the original West End cast of The Student Prince in 1926; a role he also played in New York as a replacement cast member. He toured the United States in The Student Prince in the early 1930s. He starred as Count Adrian Beltrami in the 1930 musical film Bride of the Regiment. He was married to the actress Dorothy Janis in the 1920s. He later married Edna May Lloyd in 1942. He died on 24 June 1949.
