= Madame Pompadour (1927 film) =

1927 film by Herbert Wilcox

- Directed by: Herbert Wilcox
- Written by: Ewald André Dupont; Frances Marion; Rudolph Schanzer (operetta); Ernst Welisch (operetta)
- Produced by: Ewald André Dupont
- Starring: Dorothy Gish; Antonio Moreno; Henri Bosc; Nelson Keys
- Music by: Leo Fall
- Production company: British National Pictures
- Distributed by: Paramount British Pictures
- Release date: 1 August 1927 (US)
- Running time: 70 minutes
- Country: United Kingdom
- Language: English
- Budget: £80,000

Madame Pompadour is a 1927 British silent historical drama film directed by Herbert Wilcox and starring Dorothy Gish, Antonio Moreno and Nelson Keys. The film depicts the life of Madame de Pompadour, mistress of Louis XV. It was the first film to be shot at the newly christened Elstree Studios.

== Plot ==
In 18th-century France, the King's mistress Madame Pompadour, frees her jailed lover, political prisoner Rene Laval, to make him her bodyguard.

== Cast ==
- Dorothy Gish as Madame de Pompadour
- Antonio Moreno as Rene Laval
- Nelson Keys as Duc de Courcelette
- Henri Bosc as Louis XV
- Gibb McLaughlin as Comte Maurepas
- Cyril McLaglen as Gogo
- Marsa Beauplan as Madame Poisson
- Marie Ault as Belotte

== Production ==
Gish and Wilcox had just enjoyed a big hit with Nell Gwyn. British National Pictures and Paramount signed them to make three more movies of which this was the first.

Gish was paid £1500 a week for six weeks. Filming was delayed an extra three weeks and this added a large amount to the budget and almost brought the film to a standstill.

Wilcox was paid £3000 for a film plus 25% of the profits but there were none.

== Critical reception ==
Allmovie wrote, "Dorothy Gish's screen vehicles for British director Herbert Wilcox were usually a treat, but her 1927 film Madame Pompadour tended to be weighed down by the ponderous stylistic choices of its producer, Germany's E. A. DuPont....Madame Pompadour was an especially lavish and handsome production. Unfortunately, despite its brief 75-minute running time, the film moved at a snail's pace."
