= Anni Frind =

German opera singer (1900–1987)

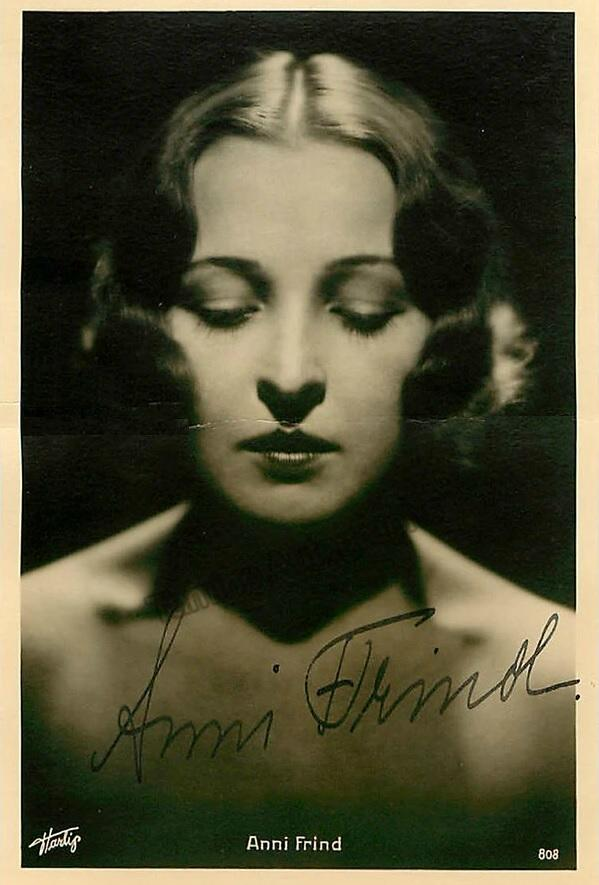
- Anni Frind by Gregor Harlip, signed photo postcard (1920s)
- Born: February 3, 1900; Nixdorf, Austria-Hungary
- Died: April 8, 1987 (aged 87); New Orleans, Louisiana, U.S.
- Occupations: Opera singer, Singing teacher

Anni Frind (3 February 1900 – 8 April 1987) was one of the most highly recorded lyric sopranos in Germany during the 1920s and 1930s.

Anni Frind was born into a German family in Nixdorf, a small town in Bohemia (now Czech Republic).

== Career ==
She made her debut in 1922 at the Volksoper Berlin and went on to sing leading soprano roles in both opera and operetta at the Munich State Opera, the Dresden State Opera, the German Opera House in Berlin and other major European cities. After the successful premiere of Ralph Benatzky's operetta Casanova in 1928, her energies were devoted mainly to operetta; and the ever-popular His Master's Voice recording of "The Nuns' Chorus" (comp. Johann Strauss II/arr. Ralph Benatzky) was produced. She appeared as Adele in Max Reinhardt's production of Die Fledermaus 200 times.

== Retirement from professional singing and later life ==
Anni Frind retired from professional singing at the outbreak of World War II, subsequently marrying. At the end of the war she sang for Allied soldiers at the front and worked as a volunteer nurse. Anni Frind-Sperling moved to New Orleans in 1951, and became a singing teacher at Newcomb College Tulane University. She died 1987 in New Orleans aged 87.
