= Spas Wenkoff =

Bulgarian-Austrian opera singer (1928–2013)

- Born: 23 September 1928; Veliko Tarnovo, Bulgaria
- Died: 12 August 2013 (aged 84); Bad Ischl, Austria
- Occupation: Operatic heldentenor
- Organization: Berlin State Opera
- Awards: Kammersänger

Spas Wenkoff (Спас Венков) (23 September 1928 – 12 August 2013) was a Bulgarian-Austrian operatic tenor. He was known internationally for mastering the heldentenor roles by Wagner, such as Tristan and Tannhäuser. He appeared in his signature role Tristan first in 1975 at the Staatsoper Dresden, followed by the centenary Bayreuth Festival in 1976, and the Metropolitan Opera in 1981, among many others. He was a member of the Berlin State Opera from 1976 to 1984, and then appeared freelance at major opera houses. He was awarded the title Kammersänger in both Berlin and Vienna.

== Career ==
Born in Veliko Tarnovo, Wenkoff initially studied law and worked for several years as a lawyer. He also studied singing, first in Tarnovo and Ruse, later in Dresden with Johannes Kemter. He worked as legal advisor, and was also second concertmaster in an amateur operetta theatre in his hometown. In 1954, he made his stage debut in the operetta Keto and Kote by Viktor Dolidze. Until 1963, he was full-time operetta tenor at the theatre, performing around 1000 times. He then moved to Ruse, Bulgaria's second largest opera house. Besides operetta, he appeared as Don Ottavio in Mozart's Don Giovanni, Almaviva in Rossini's The Barber of Seville, Alfredo in Verdi's La traviata and as Gounod's Faust. He sang there until 1965.

In 1965 he moved to East Germany, and worked at first a member of the Stadttheater Döbeln in Saxony, where he appeared in the title role of Weber's Der Freischütz, as Riccardo in Verdi's Un ballo in maschera and in the title role of Otello, among others. He moved in 1968 to the Theater Magdeburg, and appeared from 1971 to 1976 at the Halle Opera House.

On 12 October 1975, after a successful audition with stage director Harry Kupfer in Dresden, he sang the title role in Tristan und Isolde for the first time, which became his signature role. The performance was conducted by Marek Janowski, and he sang alongside Ingeborg Zobel as Isolde and Theo Adam as Marke. He appeared as Tristan a total of 226 times during his career. He appeared as Tristan at the Bayreuth Festival in the centenary year 1976, alongside Catarina Ligendza as Isolde, staged by August Everding and conducted by Carlos Kleiber. After that success, he was a member of the ensemble of the Berlin State Opera from 1976 to 1984. The Tristan production in Bayreuth was repeated in 1977, 1982 and 1983. He also performed there the title role in Götz Friedrich's new staging of Tannhäuser in 1978, alongside Gwyneth Jones as both Venus and Elisabeth, conducted by Colin Davis, and filmed live. A reviewer noted his assured singing and acting, giving the character both authority and anguish.

In 1981, Wenkoff made his debut at the Metropolitan Opera, again as Tristan. The New York Times' review compared him to Ludwig Suthaus and Ramón Vinay, and noted his "solid lower register", "care for declamation and a sensitivity to the drama", with a focus on the character's introspection, with the "finest impact during the legato of the Act II love duet". In March 1982, Wenkoff appeared at the (West German) Frankfurt Opera as Otello. In the following years, he sang mainly at the Deutsche Oper Berlin, the Vienna State Opera, the Bavarian State Opera in Munich and the Cologne Opera.

On 16 October 1982, at the Vienna State Opera, Wenkoff stepped in for the suddenly indisposed Reiner Goldberg in the middle of the first act of Tannhäuser. He appeared in other Wagner roles such as Stolzing, Parsifal, Siegmund and Siegfried.

Wenkoff retired from the stage in 1993. He received Austrian citizenship in 1984 and spent his retirement in Bad Ischl where he died after a long illness at the age of 84. He is buried in the Bad Ischl Cemetery.

=== Awards ===
Wenkoff was a Kammersänger of both the Berlin State Opera and the Vienna State Opera. He was an honorary citizen of his hometown Veliko Tarnovo and honorary member of several Wagner associations. A biography was written on the occasion of his 80th birthday by Peter M. Schneider, titled Heldentenor Spas Wenkoff: alles war Zufall.

== Recordings ==
- Ein Opernabend mit Spas Wenkoff. Richard Wagner: Arien und Szenen. CD at Ars Vivendi, earlier as LP at Eterna 1977.
- Richard Wagner: Tristan und Isolde. Complete recording. CD for Myto with Carlos Kleiber.
- Richard Wagner: Tristan und Isolde. Excerpts. CD for Bella Voce with Otmar Suitner.
- Richard Wagner: Tannhäuser. Recording of the Bayreuth Festival 1978. DVD for Deutsche Grammophon.
- Richard Wagner: Tannhäuser. Complete recording (Berlin, 1982). Gala 3 CDs GL100621.

== Literature ==
- Peter M. Schneider: Heldentenor Spas Wenkoff. Alles war Zufall. BS-Verlag, Rostock 2008, ISBN 978-3-86785-045-2 (Biography)
