= A Woman with Style =

1928 film directed by Fritz Wendhausen

- Directed by: Fritz Wendhausen
- Written by: Heinz Goldberg; Rudolph Schanzer (operetta); Ernst Welisch (operetta); Fritz Wendhausen
- Starring: Mady Christians; Peter C. Leska; Hans Thimig
- Cinematography: Arpad Viragh
- Music by: Giuseppe Becce
- Production company: Terra Film
- Distributed by: Terra Film
- Release date: 12 September 1928
- Country: Germany
- Languages: Silent; German intertitles

A Woman with Style (German: Eine Frau von Format) is a 1928 German silent film directed by Fritz Wendhausen and starring Mady Christians, Peter C. Leska and Hans Thimig. It was shot at the Terra Studios in Berlin. The film's sets were designed by the art director Hans Jacoby.

== Cast ==
- Mady Christians as Dschilly Bey
- Peter C. Leska as Graf Géza von Tököly
- Hans Thimig as Die Ordonnanz
- Robert Garrison as Hotelwirt
- Emil Heyse as Negruzzi
- Diana Karenne as Fürstin Petra
- Hedwig Wangel as Mavre

== Bibliography ==
- Bock, Hans-Michael; Bergfelder, Tim, eds. (2009). The Concise Cinegraph: Encyclopaedia of German Cinema. New York: Berghahn Books. ISBN 978-1-57181-655-9.
