= Josma Selim =

Austrian singer (1886–1929)

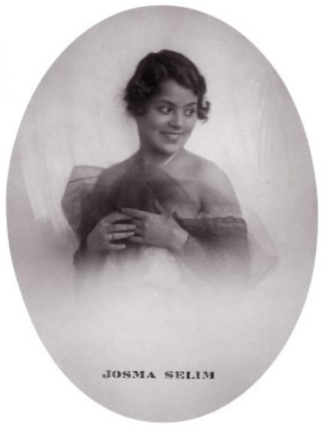
Photograph by Franz Xaver Setzer, c. 1917

Josma Selim (born Hedwig Fischer; 23 February 1886 – 25 August 1929) was an Austrian singer. She appeared in Kabarett, and toured Europe giving performances accompanied on the piano by her husband Ralph Benatzky.

== Life ==
Selim was born in Vienna in 1886. She studied singing with the Schubert singer Viktor Heim; she then turned to Kabarett, and appeared in establishments in Vienna, from 1909 to 1912 at Hölle, and from 1912 at Simplicissimus. She soon became a well known singer.

She married the composer Ralph Benatzky in 1914. He wrote about 500 songs for her, and accompanied her on the piano; together they toured Germany, Switzerland, Italy and England. Her style of presentation was based on Kabarett in Munich (in particular the venue Die Elf Scharfrichter) and in Vienna (Cabaret Fledermaus).

In 1921, Selim and Benatzky performed to great acclaim at the Deutsches Theater in Berlin, and from that time the city became important in their work. From 1924 they lived in Berlin, where they made recordings of their songs.

Selim died in Berlin in 1929.
