= That Lady in Ermine =

1948 film by Otto Preminger, Ernst Lubitsch

- Original poster
- Directed by: Ernst Lubitsch; Otto Preminger (uncredited but completed the film)
- Screenplay by: Samson Raphaelson
- Based on: Die Frau im Hermelin; 1919 operetta by Ernst Welisch & Rudolph Schanzer
- Produced by: Ernst Lubitsch
- Starring: Betty Grable; Douglas Fairbanks Jr. Cesar Romero
- Cinematography: Leon Shamroy
- Edited by: Dorothy Spencer
- Music by: Alfred Newman
- Distributed by: 20th Century Fox
- Release date: August 24, 1948
- Running time: 89 minutes
- Country: United States
- Language: English
- Budget: $3 million
- Box office: $1.5 million (US rentals)

That Lady in Ermine is a 1948 American Technicolor musical film directed by Ernst Lubitsch. The screenplay by Samson Raphaelson is based on the 1919 operetta Die Frau im Hermelin by Rudolph Schanzer and Ernst Welisch.

Although Lubitsch received sole credit as director, he died after only eight days of filming, and the project was completed by Otto Preminger.

== Plot ==
In 1861, Countess Angelina, ruler of Bergamo in North Italy near the Swiss border, marries Mario, a baron she has known since childhood. When the castle is threatened by Hungarian hussars led by Colonel Teglash on their wedding night, Mario flees.

At midnight, the paintings in the ancestral gallery come to life, and their subjects ask Francesca, Angelina's great-great-great-great-grandmother who looks exactly like Countess Angelina, to save the castle just as she did in the 16th century. Through a spyglass, Francesca observes Teglash leading the advancing army and finds herself attracted to him. When he sees her portrait, Teglash is puzzled by the fact she is wearing an ermine coat but no shoes.

Angelina greets Teglash, who flirts with her when he learns her bridegroom has escaped, but she makes it clear she respects her marriage vows and is concerned about her husband's safety. Angelina's servant Luigi, seeing how smitten the colonel is with his mistress, tells Teglash how three hundred years earlier, Francesca retained control of the castle when a tyrannical duke attempted to seize it. Via flashback, we see her, barefoot and in ermine, present herself to the duke and accompany him into his tent. After a period of time, Francesca departs, leaving the duke, with a dagger in his back, lying dead on his bed. Luigi tells the colonel that, according to rumor, she killed the duke because she feared she was falling in love with him.

Disguised as a gypsy, Mario returns to the castle but runs off when soldiers come to investigate. When he is captured, Teglash, unaware of his identity but impressed by his musical ability, decides to spare Mario's life and make him his personal gypsy. When he realizes he is Angelina's husband, he offers to free him if she dines with him that night, but she fails to rendezvous with him.

Francesca visits Teglash while he is asleep, prompting a dream in which Angelina joins him for dinner and demands a kiss. While she embraces him, she removes a knife from a roast pig and throws it at the clock, effectively stopping time. The two acknowledge their love and, as the gallery portraits look on, they fly up and crash through the roof.

The following morning, Teglash awakens to find the knife still in the pig and the clock ticking. Angelina arrives, and Teglash tells her he is freeing her husband and then describes his dream, touching her with his obvious deep feelings for her. When Mario arrives, she assures him she had nothing to do with the colonel.

Time passes, but Teglash still mourns the loss of Angelina. One night, while he is asleep, she arrives and falls asleep in a chair near his bed. Teglash revisits his prior dream, but this time the knife falls from the clock and Angelina stabs him with it. He awakens with a start and finds Angelina, who tells him Mario has left her and proposes they wed. That night at midnight, the portraits come to life once again to celebrate their union with song and dance.

== Cast ==
- Betty Grable as Francesca/Angelina
- Douglas Fairbanks Jr. as Colonel Teglash/The Duke
- Cesar Romero as Mario
- Harry Davenport as Luigi
- Walter Abel as Major Horvath/Benvenuto
- Reginald Gardiner as Alberto
- Virginia Campbell as Theresa
- Harry Cording as Orlando (uncredited)

== Production ==
In 1942, 20th Century Fox purchased the screen rights to the 1919 operetta Die Frau im Hermelin, which had served as the basis of the 1922 stage musical Lady in Ermine by Al Goodman, Harry Graham, and Cyrus Wood. The operetta previously had been filmed twice, in 1927 as The Lady in Ermine, starring Corinne Griffith and Einar Hanson, and in 1930 as Bride of the Regiment with Vivienne Segal and Walter Pidgeon. At the time, the studio announced Irene Dunne would star in the dual roles of Angelina and Francesca, and a few months later, Charles Boyer was announced as her co-star, but nothing came of the project.

When Ernst Lubitsch became involved, he initially wanted Jeanette MacDonald for the female lead, although Fox production chief Darryl F. Zanuck preferred Gene Tierney, opposite either Cornel Wilde or Rex Harrison. The Production Code Administration deemed an early draft of the screenplay "unacceptable" because "adultery and suspicion of adultery [were] treated for comedy without any compensating moral values." PCA Director Joseph Breen suggested Angelina be portrayed as anxious to preserve her marriage and Mario be the one to instigate the dissolution of their union. His recommendations were incorporated into the script, and the final draft of the screenplay was approved. During pre-production, the film's title was Lady in Ermine, which was changed to This Is the Moment when principal photography began. By the time the film was released, its title had been changed yet again.

The film was Lubitsch's first musical project since directing The Merry Widow for MGM in 1934. It proved to be his last film. Eight days after principal photography began, he died of a heart attack, and Otto Preminger, who had completed A Royal Scandal when Lubitsch was forced to withdraw due to illness in 1944, took over the reins. He stipulated sole screen credit should go to Lubitsch "as a mark of respect and admiration for the departed master."

Friedrich Hollaender and Leo Robin composed the five musical numbers performed in the film.

The cast included Reginald Gardiner and Virginia Campbell, but an error on the promotional poster (pictured above) mistakenly credits "Virginia Gardiner."

== Critical reception ==
Bosley Crowther of The New York Times called the film "a bright and beguiling swatch of nonsense cut straight from the rich, gold-braided cloth of best-grade Graustarkian romance and done in a nimble, playful style." He added, "Wrapped up in Technicolor, which complements the trappings and costumes, it is a luxurious something to walk into on a damp and oppressive August day. For Mr. Lubitsch was nothing if not thoroughly indulgent of the tastes of the workaday moviegoers for elegance, amplitude and splash. And he also was nothing if not generous—as far as his writers would be—with the twists and turns and conniptions of an aggressively impudent wit. Fortunately, both of these penchants have been amply supported in this film."

TV Guide rated it 2½ out of four stars, noting it "is definitely not a Lubitsch film" and adding, "Though the production was lavish, the film has no life and remains an exercise in trite and contrived plotting."

Douglas Fairbanks Jr. thought that Otto Preminger "ruined everything. No sense of humour, no fun, everything light in the... script was squeezed out... It just wrecked my [career] momentum, just wrecked it."

== Awards and nominations ==
Friedrich Hollaender and Leo Robin were nominated for the Academy Award for Best Original Song for "This Is the Moment," but lost to Jay Livingston and Ray Evans for "Buttons and Bows" from The Paleface.

Samson Raphaelson was nominated for the Writers Guild of America Award for Best Written American Musical.

== Home media ==
On September 25, 2006, the film was released on DVD with Ernst Lubitsch's 1946 film Cluny Brown as part of the two-disc set Hollywood Highlights 1 - Comedy.
