= Hilde Spiel =

Austrian writer (1911–1990)

- Hilde Spiel in the 1960s
- Born: Hilde Maria Spiel; 19 October 1911; Vienna, Austria-Hungary
- Died: 30 November 1990 (aged 79)
- Resting place: Bad Ischl Friedhof
- Education: University of Vienna
- Occupations: Writer, journalist, translator, cultural critic
- Writing career
- Pen name: Grace Hanshaw, Jean Lenoir
- Language: German, English
- Genres: Fiction, essays, literary criticism
- Notable works: Fanny von Arnstein oder die Emanzipation, Rückkehr nach Wien, Lisas Zimmer
- Notable awards: Order of Merit of the Federal Republic of Germany, 1st class (1962); Austrian Cross of Honour for Science and Art (1972); Goethe Medal (1990)

Hilde Spiel (19 October 1911 – 30 November 1990) (pseudonyms: Grace Hanshaw and Jean Lenoir) was an Austrian writer and journalist who received numerous awards and honours.

== Biography ==
=== Youth in Vienna ===
Hilde Spiel was born in Vienna in October 1911, into a prosperous assimilated and apostatized Jewish family. Her paternal grandfather had attained a level of prominence in Vienna as a salesman, living in the 1st district of the capital. Her parents, who became Roman Catholics as adults, were Hugo F. Spiel, an engineering research chemist and an officer in the Austro-Hungarian army during World War I, and Marie (née Gutfeld). For the first ten years of her life she lived in a garden apartment in Probusgasse in the prestigious Heiligenstadt, in the 19th district, where her mother's family had lived for generations, and then between Arenbergpark and Fasangasse in the 3rd district. She had no siblings, and was a nervous child.

=== Studies and emigration ===
After passing her school-leaving examination at Schwarzwald School, she studied philosophy at the University of Vienna, under Moritz Schlick among others. From 1933 to 1935 she worked at the Industrial Psychological Research Centre at the University of Vienna; in 1933 she joined the Social Democratic Workers' Party (which was banned in 1934) and wrote her first two novels, Kati auf der Brücke and Verwirrung am Wolfgangsee. She received her doctorate in 1936 with Versuch einer Darstellungstheorie des Films (Attempt at a representational theory of film). In the same year she emigrated to London, where she married the writer and journalist Peter de Mendelssohn.

On settling in London they had two children, Christine (later Shuttleworth), now a translator and indexer, and Felix de Mendelssohn, who became a psychoanalyst practising in Vienna and Berlin. In 1941, Hilde Spiel became a British subject, and from 1944 she contributed regularly to the New Statesman magazine.

=== Postwar years ===
On 30/31 January 1946, wearing British army uniform, she flew to Vienna in a military aircraft, as a war correspondent for the New Statesman. Her declared intention was to 'compare my present life with my past, test my loyalty, and subject my powers of emotion to an experiment'. In Vienna she met, among others, the Czech painter Josef Dobrowsky, the Communist city councillor in charge of cultural affairs Viktor Matejka, and the young cultural critic Hans Weigel, who had returned from exile, and sought out the legendary intellectuals' coffee house Café Herrenhof. She also visited refugee camps in Carinthia, and the Italian town of Udine, at that time also under British occupation.

On 7 March 1946 she returned to London and wrote up the notes she had made on her observations in Vienna as a travel report. It was not until the late 1960s that she translated her English-language report into German, editing and expanding it substantially; it was published in 1968 under the title Rückkehr nach Wien (Return to Vienna). The report, according to one review, was a 'self-examination as well as an examination of a city, a mixture of personal and historical snapshots. All written in the crystal-clear, straightforward style of poetical and analytical precision already so typical of Spiel.' In 1946 she returned a further three times to 'the Continent' – (Paris, Budapest, Brixen, Nuremberg), and soon afterwards settled in Berlin with her family until 1948. Here she was active as a drama critic for Die Welt as well as the New Statesman, La France Libre, the Berlin Tagesspiegel and the weekly magazine sie.

On her return to Britain, Spiel worked as a cultural correspondent for the Neue Zeitung, the Süddeutsche Zeitung, the Tagesspiegel, the Weltwoche, The Guardian and Theater Heute, and also as a broadcaster. In the postwar years she was one of the most important literary critics in the German-speaking world, and promoted the breakthrough of the Austrian writer Heimito von Doderer among others. Over several decades she repeatedly found herself in ideological conflict with the writers Elias Canetti and Friedrich Torberg. Conversely, she counted many outstanding writers among her close friends, particularly the playwright and novelist Thomas Bernhard.

=== Return to Austria ===
From 1955 she had a second home in St Wolfgang in Upper Austria. In 1963 she finally returned to Austria, where she continued to work as a cultural correspondent for the Frankfurter Allgemeine Zeitung (FAZ) and published several volumes of essays and her memoirs. Since the mid-1960s, she was acquainted with, and translated poetry by, British-American writer W. H. Auden, who had owned a house in Kirchstetten since 1957.

After her separation from Peter de Mendelssohn in 1963 and her divorce in 1970, she was married, from 1972 until his death in 1981, to the writer and retired BBC employee Hans Flesch von Brunningen. In the 1980s she spent another year in London as FAZ correspondent.

Hilde Spiel was a member of the Austrian PEN Centre, and its general secretary from 1966 to 1971. In 1971 she took on the post of vice-president, and after the resignation of Alexander Lernet-Holenia in 1972, and at his suggestion, stood for election as president. However, her election was blocked by an initiative mainly conducted by Friedrich Torberg, who tried to persuade some of his friends to publish attacks on Hilde Spiel. After resigning from the Austrian PEN Centre in protest, she joined the German centre and remained active in International PEN, in particular, together with Heinrich Böll, in its Writers in Prison Committee. In addition she joined the Grazer Autorenversammlung, today the largest writers' association in Austria, where she became a defender and mentor of controversial younger writers, such as Wolfgang Bauer and Peter Turrini. She also became an active member of the German Academy for Language and Literature in Darmstadt.

Hilde Spiel died in Vienna in 1990. Like her parents and her second husband, Hans Flesch von Brunningen, she was buried in the cemetery at Bad Ischl. Her tombstone records her name as Hilde Maria Flesch-Brunningen.

== Career ==
Apart from her journalistic work, Hilde Spiel was the author of novels, stories and works of cultural history. The biography Fanny von Arnstein oder die Emanzipation (Fanny von Arnstein: A Daughter of the Enlightenment, 1758–1818), her favourite among her own books, was described as 'a remarkable historical document ... the portrait, not only of one of the most brilliant and charming women of her time, but of a whole era of European culture and history'. Spiel was also a distinguished translator into German of English-language novels and dramas.

== Awards and honours ==
- 1934 Julius Reich Prize
- 1962 Order of Merit of the Federal Republic of Germany, 1st class
- 1972 Austrian Cross of Honour for Science and Art
- 1972 Golden Order of Merit for Services to the State of Vienna
- 1976 Prize of the City of Vienna for Journalism
- 1978 Golden Order of Merit of the State of Salzburg
- 1981 Johann Heinrich Merck Prize
- 1981 Roswitha von Gandersheim Prize
- 1981 Donauland Prize
- 1985 Peter Rosegger Prize
- 1986 Ernst Robert Curtius Prize
- 1986 Honorary Award of the Cultural Circle of the Federation of German Industry
- 1988 Literature Award of the Bavarian Academy of the Fine Arts
- 1989 Friedrich Schiedel Prize for Literature
- 1990 Goethe Medal
- 2003 Hilde-Spiel-Gasse, street named after Hilde Spiel in Liesing, Vienna
- 2011 Hilde-Spiel-Weg, path named after Hilde Spiel in St Wolfgang, Austria

== Works ==
- Kati auf der Brücke. Berlin etc. 1933. New edition: Edition Atelier, Vienna 2012, ISBN 978-3-902498-58-8.
- Verwirrung am Wolfgangsee. Leipzig etc. 1935
- Flöte und Trommeln. Vienna 1947
- Der Park und die Wildnis. Munich 1953
- London. Munich 1956 (with photographer Elisabeth Niggemeyer)
- Laurence Olivier. Berlin 1958
- Welt im Widerschein. Munich 1960
- Fanny von Arnstein oder Die Emanzipation. Frankfurt am Main 1962
- Lisas Zimmer. Munich 1965
- Verliebt in Döbling. Vienna etc. 1965 (with Franz Vogler)
- Rückkehr nach Wien. Munich 1968
- Wien. Munich 1971
- Städte und Menschen. Vienna 1971
- Kleine Schritte. Munich 1976
- Mirko und Franca. Munich 1980
- Die Früchte des Wohlstands. Munich 1981
- In meinem Garten schlendernd. Munich 1981
- Englische Ansichten. Stuttgart 1984
- Ortsbestimmung. Weilheim 1984
- Der Mann mit der Pelerine und andere Geschichten. Bergisch Gladbach 1985
- Der Baumfrevel. Stuttgart 1987
- Vienna's golden autumn. London 1987
- Anna und Anna. Vienna 1988
- Venedig, Theater der Träume. Munich 1988 (with Giosanna Crivelli and Thomas Klinger)
- Die hellen und die finsteren Zeiten. Munich 1989
- Welche Welt ist meine Welt? Munich etc. 1990
- Die Dämonie der Gemütlichkeit. Munich 1991
- Das Haus des Dichters. Literarische Essays, Interpretationen, Rezensionen. List, Munich 1992
- Hilde Spiel – die grande dame. Göttingen 1992 (with Anne Linsel)
- Briefwechsel. Munich etc.. 1995

== Edited works ==
- England erzählt. Frankfurt am Main etc. 1960
- William Shakespeare, König Richard III.. Frankfurt/M. etc. 1964
- Der Wiener Kongreß in Augenzeugenberichten. Düsseldorf 1965
- Die zeitgenössische Literatur Österreichs. Zürich etc. 1976

== Translations into German ==
- Nigel Balchin: Elf Jahre und ein Tag. Hamburg 1952
- Elizabeth Bowen: Eine Welt der Liebe. Cologne etc. 1958
- James M. Cain: Die Rechnung ohne den Wirt. Hamburg 1950 (with Peter de Mendelssohn)
- Peter de Mendelssohn: Festung in den Wolken. Zürich 1946 (with Peter de Mendelssohn)
- William Macneile Dixon: Die Situation des Menschen. Munich 1963
- Rumer Godden: Uralt der Wind vom Himalaja. Hamburg 1952
- Graham Greene: Leihen Sie uns Ihren Mann?. Vienna etc. 1967
- Graham Greene: Die Stunde der Komödianten. Vienna etc. 1966
- Thomas Kilroy: Tod und Auferstehung des Herrn Roche in Dublin. Reinbek bei Hamburg 1968
- Hugh Leonard: Der Mann für alles. Reinbek bei Hamburg 1967
- Mary McCarthy: Ein Blitz aus heiterem Himmel. Munich etc. 1970 (with Maria Dessauer)
- Edna O'Brien: Virginia. Frankfurt am Main 1982
- Joe Orton: Seid nett zu Mr. Sloane. Beute. Reinbek bei Hamburg 1967
- James Saunders: Abschiedskanon. Reinbek bei Hamburg 1974
- James Saunders: Bessere Zeiten. Reinbek bei Hamburg 1990
- James Saunders: Ein Duft von Blumen. Ein unglücklicher Zufall. Wer war Mr. Hilary? Nachbarn. Reinbek bei Hamburg 1967
- James Saunders: Herbst. Reinbek bei Hamburg 1982
- James Saunders: Irre alte Welt. Reinbek bei Hamburg 1976
- James Saunders: Leib und Seele. Reinbek bei Hamburg 1978
- James Saunders: Michael Kohlhaas. Reinbek bei Hamburg 1973
- James Saunders: Der Schulmeister. Reinbek bei Hamburg 1990
- James Saunders: Spiele. Reinbek bei Hamburg 1971
- James Saunders: ... und was kommt danach?. Reinbek bei Hamburg 1970
- James Saunders: Vogelgezwitscher. Reinbek bei Hamburg 1980
- Tom Stoppard: Akrobaten. Reinbek bei Hamburg 1973
- Tom Stoppard: Das einzig Wahre. Reinbek bei Hamburg 1983
- Tom Stoppard: Travesties. Reinbek bei Hamburg 1976
- Jack White: Wer fragt nach Finken?. Reinbek bei Hamburg 1971
- Emlyn Williams: Die leichten Herzens sind. Munich 1983
- Angus Wilson: Mehr Freund als Untermieter. Frankfurt am Main 1961
- Angus Wilson: Was für reizende Vögel. Wiesbaden 1958

== Translations into English ==
- Alfred Schmeller: Cubism. London 1961
- Alfred Schmeller: Surrealism. London 1961

== Sources ==
- Spiel, Hilde (2009) [1968]. Rückkehr nach Wien: Ein Tagebuch [Return to Vienna: A Diary] (in German). Munich: Milena Verlag orig. publisher Nymphenburger. ISBN 978-3-85286-177-7.
- Bettina Hawlitschek: Fluchtwege aus patriarchaler Versteinerung. Geschlechterrollen und Geschlechterbeziehungen im Frühwerk Hilde Spiels. Pfaffenweiler: Centaurus 1997. (Frauen in der Literaturgeschichte; 8) ISBN 3-8255-0140-X
- Howells, Christa Victoria (4 June 2009). "Heimat und Exil: Ihre Dynamik im Werk von Hilde Spiel (German text)". Rice Scholarship Home. hdl:1911/16739.
- Bettina Krammer: Wer ist Lisa L. Curtis? Manifestation der hysterischen Charakterstruktur sowie der Emigrations- und Suchtproblematik bei Lisa Leitner Curtis in "Lisas Zimmer" von Hilde Spiel. Frankfurt am Main etc.: Lang 1998. (Europäische Hochschulschriften; Series 1, Deutsche Sprache und Literatur; 1686) ISBN 3-631-32663-7
- Marcel Reich-Ranicki: Reden auf Hilde Spiel. Munich: List 1991. ISBN 3-471-78549-3
- Marcel Reich-Ranicki: Über Hilde Spiel. Munich: dtv 1998. (dtv; 12530) ISBN 3-423-12530-6
- Hilde Spiel. Weltbürgerin der Literatur, edited by Hans A. Neunzig and Ingrid Schramm. Vienna: Zsolnay 1999. (Profile; vol. 2, issue 3) ISBN 3-552-04895-2
- Waltraud Strickhausen: Die Erzählerin Hilde Spiel oder "Der weite Wurf in die Finsternis". New York etc.: Lang 1996. (Exile Studies; 3) ISBN 0-8204-2623-7
- Sandra Wiesinger-Stock: Hilde Spiel. Ein Leben ohne Heimat? Vienna: Verlag für Gesellschaftskritik 1996. (Biographische Texte zur Kultur- und Zeitgeschichte; 16) ISBN 3-85115-233-6
