= Rudi Gfaller =

Austrian actor (1882–1972)

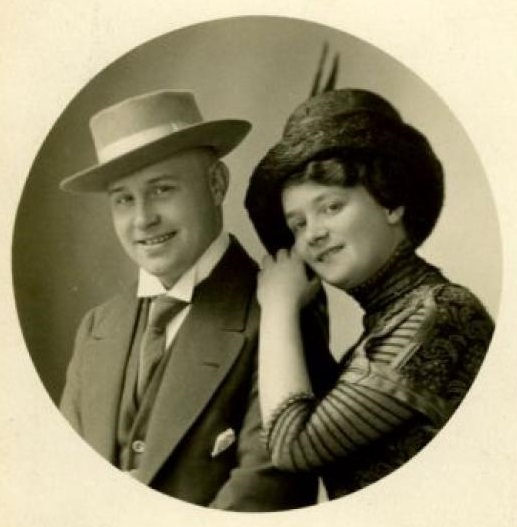
- Rudi Gfaller and his wife, Therese Wiet
- Born: Rudolf Gfaller; 10 November 1882; Vienna, Austria
- Died: 11 February 1972 (aged 89); Bad Ischl, Austria
- Occupations: composer; operetta singer

Rudi Gfaller (10 November 1882 – 11 February 1972) was an Austrian operetta composer and singer. Born in Vienna, he began his career as an actor and singer and appeared in various provincial theatres in Germany. In 1906, he composed the first of his twelve operettas. Gfaller was married to the operetta singer Therese Wiet and often appeared with her in Leipzig where the couple were based for most of their careers. In 1943 he retired to their house in Bad Ischl where he died at the age of 89.

== Life and career ==
Gfaller was born in Vienna, the son of a restaurant proprietor. He began acting in children's roles at the Carltheater in the suburbs of Vienna and then attended the Dorr'sche Theatre and Music School. As an adult he worked as an actor and tenor singer in musical theatre and operetta in various provincial theatres in Germany and in what is now the Czech Republic, including Rudolstadt, Wiesbaden, Darmstadt, Magdeburg, and Stralsund. In 1906, he composed his first operetta, Der Frühlingsonkel which premiered at the municipal theatre in Stralsund. He then relocated to Leipzig where he continued his career as an operetta singer. It was there that he met his future wife, the soprano Therese Wiet. The couple married in 1912 and would often perform together after their marriage.

Gfaller's second operetta, Der Windelkavalier, premiered to considerable success in 1914 at the Neues Operetten-Theater in Leipzig. He went on to compose nine more between 1915 and 1944, many of them while staying at his country house in Bad Ischl. In 1926, he became the founding artistic director of the Leipzig theatre Panorama Künstlerspiele where both he and his wife were based until their retirement. A critic for Die Weltbühne noted in 1931 that the couple could have had international careers had they not remained "riveted" to Leipzig. When the theatre was destroyed by Allied bombing in 1943, Rudi and Therese retired to their house in Bad Ischl and lived there for the rest of their lives. They were both active in the musical life of the town, which hosted an annual Operetta Week festival after the war. Gfaller also became a board member of the Gesellschaft für Operette, Musical und Unterhaltungsmusik (Society for Operetta, Musical Theatre, and Entertainment Music).

Gfaller came out of retirement in the early 1960s to compose his final operetta, Der feurige Elias. The phrase in the title, "feurige Elias" ("fiery Elijah" in English), is a German colloquial term for steam locomotives. The libretto is based on the real-life closing in 1957 of the narrow-gauge railway line that had connected Bad Ischl with Salzburg since 1893. The closure led to protests, rallies, and a final silent march by the residents of the town and the railway's employees. Composed as a "folk operetta", it was premiered in Bad Ischl in 1963 with a cast that included the veteran operetta singers Mitzi Tesar and Emmerich Arleth and was broadcast later that year on Austrian television.

Therese Wiet died in 1971. Rudi Gfaller died a year later at the age of 89. They are buried together in the Bad Ischl Cemetery.

== Works ==
- Der Frühlingsonkel, operetta in 3 acts, libretto by Karl Schmalz; premiered Stralsund, Stadttheater. 1906
- Der Windelkavalier, operetta in 3 acts, libretto by Karl Dibbern and Martin Martin; premiered Leipzig, Neues Operetten-Theater, 1914
- Der dumme August, operetta in 3 acts, libretto by Bruno Decker and Robert Pohl; premiered Altenburg, Hoftheater, 1915
- Der Mann seiner Frau, operetta in 3 acts, libretto by Bruno Decker and Robert Pohl; premiered Frankfurt, Albert-Schumann-Theater, 1917
- Eine Walzernacht, operetta in 3 acts, libretto by Hans Bachwitz; premiered Erfurt, Stadttheater, 1918
- Wenn dich die bösen Buben locken, musical farce in 3 acts, libretto by Hans Bachwitz and Hans Sturm; premiered Kassel, Residenztheater, 1919
- Der glückliche Kiebitz, operetta in 3 acts, libretto by Bruno Decker and Robert Pohl; premiered Nuremberg, Stadttheater am Ring, 1921
- Hallo, hier Garmisch, revue operetta in two parts and 11 scenes, libretto by Carl Bretschneider; premiered Fürth, Stadttheater, 1937
- Die Sacher-Pepi (originally titled Die Gräfin bitteschön), operetta in 3 acts, libretto by Ernst Welisch; premiered Leipzig, Neues Operetten-Theater, 1939
- Venedig in Wien, operetta in 3 acts, libretto by Ernst Welisch; premiered Chemnitz, Central-Theater, 1941
- Die himmelblaue Stadt, operetta in 3 acts, libretto by Ernst Friese and Ernst Welisch; premiered Ostrava, Mährisch-Schlesisches Theater, 1944
- Der feurige Elias, folk operetta in 3 acts, libretto by Hermann Demel and Maximilian Gottwald; premiered Bad Ischl, Kurhaus, 1963
