= Casanova (Benatzky) =

Operetta by Ralph Benatzky

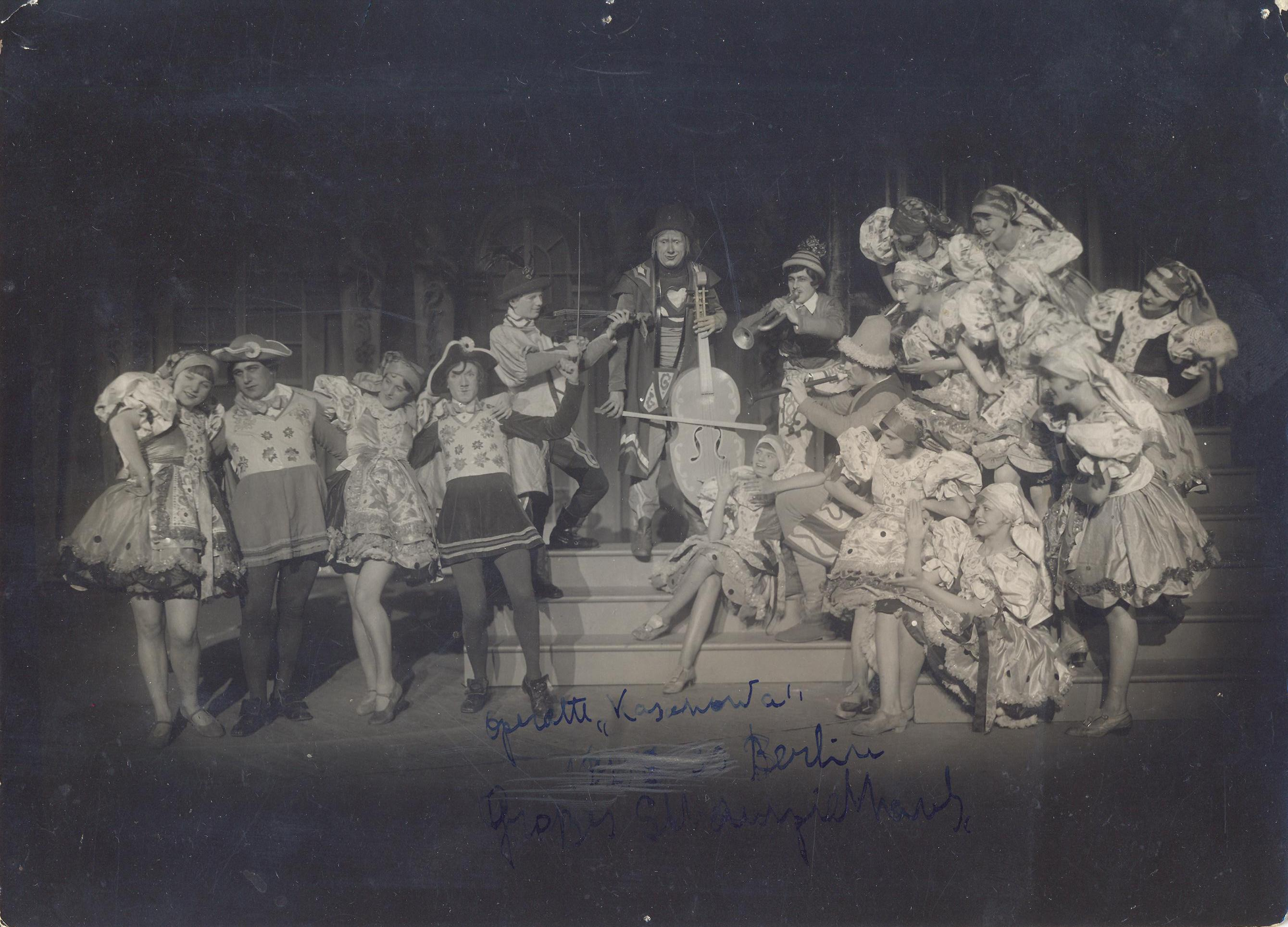
Comedian Harmonists, 1928

Casanova is an operetta in three acts by Ralph Benatzky. It is based on the life of 18th century Italian adventurer and womanizer Giacomo Casanova. The work utilizes the music of the 1878 operetta Blindekuh written by Johann Strauss II but with a different and new libretto by Rudolph Schanzer and Ernst Welisch. Its first performance was on 1 September 1928 at the Großes Schauspielhaus in Berlin.

Casanova was one of a series of spectacular "revue-operettas" Benatzky wrote for producer and revue director Erik Charell at the Großes Schauspielhaus. The star-studded original cast of Casanova included Michael Bohnen, the well-known opera bass-baritone in the title role, Anni Frind, Anny Ahlers, Paul Morgan, and Siegfried "Sig" Arno. La Jana was a dancer, and the Comedian Harmonists appeared there with enormous success. The Nuns' Chorus is a well-known excerpt from the work that has been performed on the concert stage.

In December 2024 the work had a revival in Stuttgart with Michael Mayes in the title role, Esther Dierkes as Laura and Moritz Kallenberg as Lieutenant Hohenfals.
