= Rainbow (musical) =

Rainbow is a musical in two acts with music by Vincent Youmans, lyrics by Oscar Hammerstein II, and a book co-authored by Laurence Stallings and Hammerstein. After flopping on Broadway in 1928, it was adapted by Warner Bros. into the 1930 Western musical film Song of the West.

== Performance history ==
Rainbow premiered on Broadway at the Gallo Opera House on November 21, 1928. While critics praised the quality of the show and in particular the higher standard of the dialogue, the length of the show was deemed too long, and technical troubles with sets made scene changes delay the action of the play. The opening premiere extended more than four hours, and several critics commented that the show should have been in development longer in tryout performances in order to make necessary cuts and other adjustments to make the production smoother and the length shorter. The musical ran for just 29 performances; closing on December 15, 1928.

The Broadway production was produced by Philip Goodman, directed by Hammerstein, and choreographed by Busby Berkeley. Max Steiner orchestrated the music, and served as the show's music director. The costumes were designed by Charles LeMaire and the sets by Frank E. Gates and Edward A. Morange. It starred Allan Prior as Harry Stanton, Louise Brown as Virginia Brown, Libby Holman as Lotta, Rupert Lucas as Major Davolo, Brian Donlevy as Captain Robert Singleton, Henry Pemberton as Colonel Brown, and Helen Lynd as Penny.

== Plot ==
Set in the years 1849–1851, the plot follows the soldier Harry Stanton who is stationed at Fort Independence in Missouri and is in love with Virginia, the daughter of his commanding officer. He is dishonorably discharged and sentenced to prison after killing Major Davolo, a troublemaker, in self-defense. He escapes and flees to California with Virginia during the 1849 Gold Rush. The couple marry along the journey, and eventually arrive in the mining town of Red Dog, California. When finding gold leads to naught, the couple relocate to Sacramento, California where Harry establishes a gambling house much to the chagrin of Virginia. There marriage begins to fall apart. After other misadventures, Harry and Virginia reconcile in San Francisco had Harry's good name and military record are cleared when he is exonerated from his murder conviction.
