= Meine Schwester und ich =

Musical comedy

- Musical comedy by Ralph Benatzky
- Translation: My Sister and I
- Librettist: Ralph Benatzky; Robert Blum
- Language: German
- Premiere: 29 March 1930; Komödie, Berlin

Meine Schwester und ich (My Sister and I) is a musical comedy in two acts with prelude and postlude. Ralph Benatzky composed the music and also wrote the libretto together with Robert Blum. Benatzky based the work on a contemporary comedy by Georges Berr and Louis Verneuil. The work was premiered on 29 March 1930 in Berlin, Germany, at the Theater am Gendarmenmarkt, also known as Komödie.

== Roles ==
The cast need not be made up by operatic voices; performers can be singing actors.

Role	Voice type/actor type	
Dolly Fleuriot, originally Princess Saint Labiche	soprano	Liane Haid
Dr. Roger Fleuriot, librarian	tenor	Oskar Karlweis
Count Lacy de Nagyfaludi	buffo tenor	
Filosel, owner of a shoe shop	singing comic actor	Felix Bressart
Irma, saleswoman	soubrette	
Presiding judge	tenor	
Bailiff	baritone	
First committee member	speaking role	
Second committee member	speaking role	
Henrietta	contralto	
Charly, valet	baritone	
customer at Filosel	silent role	

== Scoring ==
The music is scored for an orchestra of flute, two saxophones, two clarinets, bassoon, two French horns, two trumpets, oboe, harp, celeste, banjo, percussion and strings. The stage music requires a violin and a piano. Compared to the revues Benatzky had been known for in the 1920s, Meine Schwester und ich is one of the pieces Benatzky wrote in a "new vein" of "smaller scale, more intellectual, more cabaret-style forms of operetta".

== Synopsis ==
The work is set in Paris and Nancy about 1930.

=== Prelude ===
Setting: Courtroom

The next case is summoned. Married couple Dolly and Dr. Roger Fleuriot appear before the judge. They want their marriage dissolved on the grounds of irreconcilable differences. The judge finds this odd, as both give the appearance of still being in love with each other. He therefore asks that they explain to him how they came to know each other and how their marriage has developed. Dr. Fleuriot complies immediately.

=== Act 1 ===
Setting: Library in Chateau Saint-Labiche in Paris

Princess Dolly has inherited the chateau Saint-Labiche. The rich young lady can afford to engage her own librarian, and music scientist Roger Fleuriot has been appointed to the post. He has a secret admiration for his employer, but is far too shy to show his feelings. He comes from a poor background and regards her riches as a barrier to any relationship beyond their professional one.

Dolly would welcome an approach from her librarian. Her delicate attempts to pry him out of his shell have been unsuccessful. She has a betrothed, the rich Count Lacy, but she feels nothing more than friendship for him. She tells Lacy quite openly that she is unluckily in love with someone, but not with whom.

Roger cannot bear to meet the lady each day, one with whom he is in love but for whom he cannot declare his feelings. In order to distract himself, he has applied successfully for a professorship at the university of Nancy. Today is his last day of work at chateau Saint-Labiche. As he is saying farewell to his employer, she explains that she has a sister in Nancy, working as a saleswoman in Filosel's shoe shop. Dolly would like to send her a ring along with a letter; Roger volunteers quickly to be the messenger. He does not know that Dolly has invented the sister in order to act as her later.

=== Act 2 ===
Setting: a shoe shop in Nancy

Monsieur Filosel, owner of an eponymous shoe shop, is struggling with his saleswoman Irma; she constantly daydreams of being a star in a revue. He has to drag her back down to earth frequently. When a pretty young lady appeals to him for a job, he is delighted and employs her straight away, terminating Irma's employment the next time she is away with the fairies. They part on good terms, Irma with a good reference for another job and another few hours' employment in this one.

After a short while, Dr. Fleuriot enters the shop. He recognises that the shop girl must be Dolly's sister, as the resemblance is really remarkable. It's love at first sight for him, and the sister doesn't seem to be that rich, given that she's working in a shoe shop. He immediately invites her for a glass of wine in the evening and is delighted when she does not reject him. Dolly cannot believe how well her plan is working.

Roger has barely left the store when a new customer arrives. It is Count Lacy. Someone has told him where fate has sent his betrothed and he has followed her. Irma serves him and he immediately falls for her. This girl seems to suit him so much better than Dolly. He invites her to elope with him to Monte Carlo and she does not resist; they leave the shop in high spirits.

Roger returns to pick up "the sister"; after a long kiss the couple leave the building arm in arm.

=== Postlude ===
Setting: back in the courtroom

Roger has told the whole story to the judge and now elaborates. A few weeks after the wedding, Roger discovered the truth about the "sister" and retreated into his shell again; he is uneasy with the situation.

Not only does the judge deny the application to dissolve the marriage, but talks urgently and earnestly with Roger. He should try again with his beloved; riches need not be a burden, but rather lighten the burden of life. The judge can plainly see the love between Roger and his wife, which should last a lifetime.

Hand in hand, Roger and Dolly leave the courtroom.

== Musical highlights ==
Dolly: "Um ein bisschen Liebe dreht sich das Leben" ("The world revolves around a little love") (tango)

Roger: "Ich lade Sie ein, Fräulein" ("I invite you, Ma'am")

Roger: "Mein Mädel ist nur eine Verkäuferin in einem Schuhgeschäft mit 80 Franc Salär in der Woche" ("My girl is just a sales girl in a shoe shop, with 80 francs salary per week")

== Film adaptations ==
The musical comedy was filmed in 1954, directed by Paul Martin, with Sonja Ziemann, Adrian Hoven, Herta Staal, Paul Hörbiger and Werner Fuetterer in the main roles. In 1956 it was filmed again for television (black and white), this time under the direction of Franz Peter Wirth and with Anneliese Rothenberger as Dolly, Johannes Heesters as Roger and Kurt Großkurth as Filosel. Friedrich Meier arranged the music, which was performed by Erwin Lehn and his Südfunk Tanzorchester (dance orchestra of the SDR).

A further TV adaptation of the operetta took place in 1975, directed by Fred Kraus for the ZDF, with Heidi Brühl, Béla Ernyey, Ernst H. Hilbich, Irene Mann and Willy Millowitsch in the main roles.
