= Therese Wiet =

Austrian singer

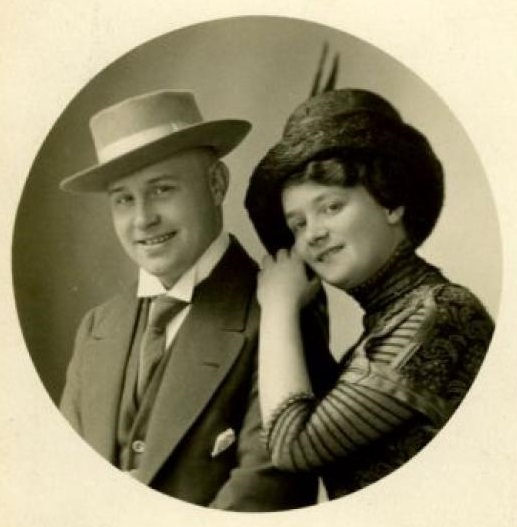
- Therese Wiet and her husband, Rudi Gfaller
- Born: Theresia Wiet; 15 October 1885; Vienna, Austria
- Died: 24 January 1971 (aged 85); Bad Ischl, Austria
- Occupation: operetta singer (soprano)

Therese Wiet (15 October 1885 – 24 January 1971) was an Austrian operetta and concert singer whose career was based primarily in Leipzig. She was married to the operetta singer and composer Rudi Gfaller.

== Life and career ==
Wiet was born in Vienna where her father was a civil servant. She studied at the conservatory there and then trained as a singer in Heidelberg with her aunt, Helene Wiet who had been a prominent opera singer in Prague and Vienna until her retirement from the stage in 1899. She made her debut at the Stadttheater in Heidelberg as Fiametta in Franz von Suppé's operetta Boccaccio. She was then engaged by the Neuen Operetten-Theater in Leipzig where she sang leading soprano roles in numerous operettas, including the title role in the first Leipzig performance of Emmerich Kálmán's Die Csárdásfürstin.

It was in Leipzig that Wiet met her future husband, Rudi Gfaller, at the time a tenor singing with the company and later an operetta composer himself. The couple married in 1912. When Gfaller became the director of Leipzig's Panorama Künstlerspiele in 1926, she moved to that theatre. A critic for Die Weltbühne noted in 1931 that she could have had international stardom had she not remained "riveted" to Leipzig. The Panorama was destroyed by Allied bombing in 1943, after which the couple retired to their house in the Austrian spa town of Bad Ischl. She remained active in the musical life of the town until her death in 1971 at the age of 85. Her husband died a year later. They are buried together in the Bad Ischl Cemetery.
