= Bad Ischl Friedhof =

Coordinates: 47°42′27″N 13°37′24″E

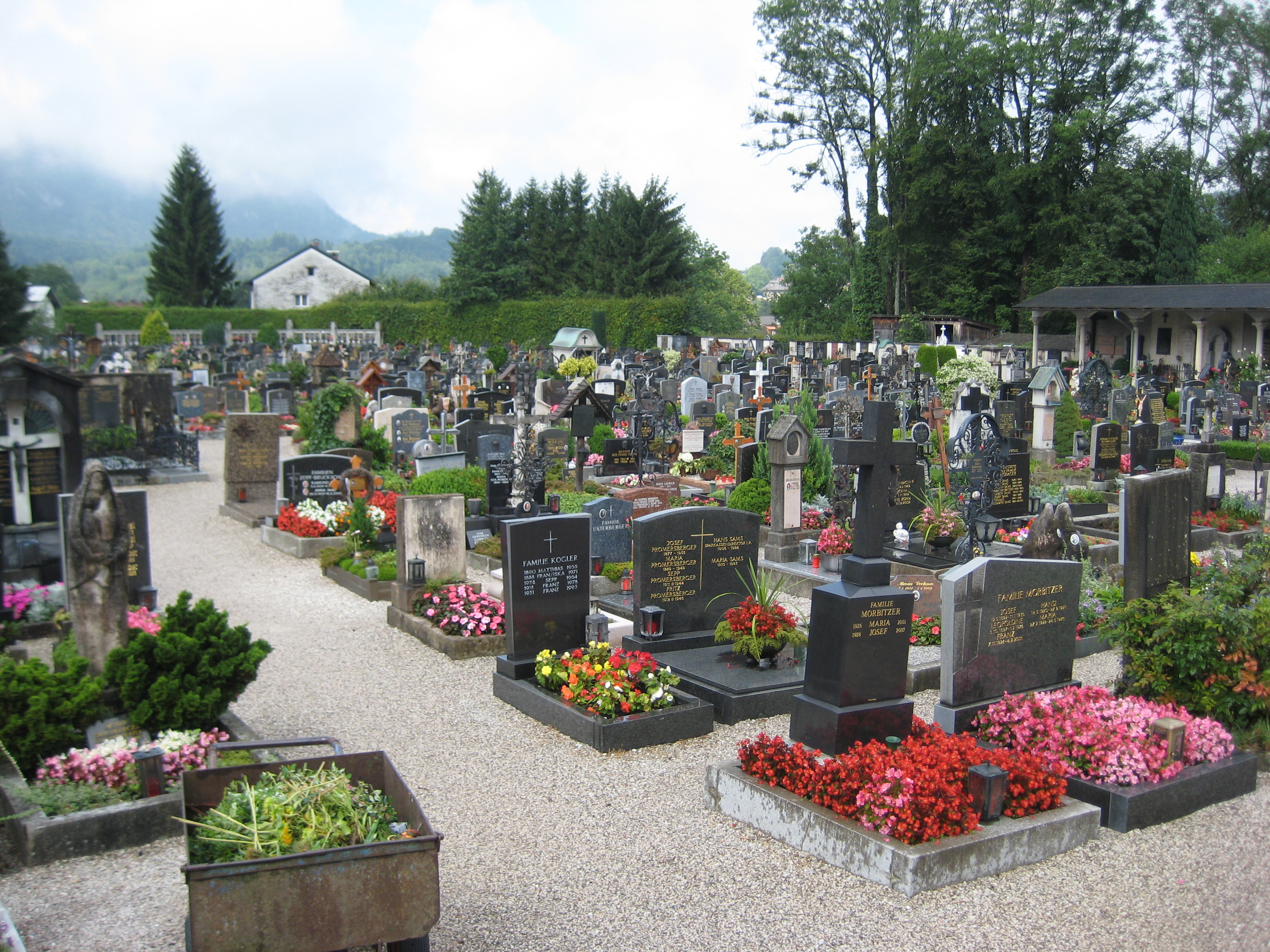
View of the cemetery in 2013

Bad Ischl Friedhof is the town cemetery of Bad Ischl in Austria. It is on the State of Upper Austria's list of protected historical sites.

The cemetery was originally located at the Church of St. Nikolaus. In 1719 it was moved to its present location on Grazer Straße where it is laid out on land behind the Sebastiankapelle. The Sebastiankapelle (Saint Sebastian's chapel) was built in 1692 by Johann Lidl von Lidlsheim in gratitude to Saint Sebastian for his family's escape from the plague. Johann Lidle and his second wife are thought to be buried beneath its altar. Later members of the family are buried in the Friedhof. Like the cemetery behind it, the chapel is on the list of protected historical sites in Upper Austria.

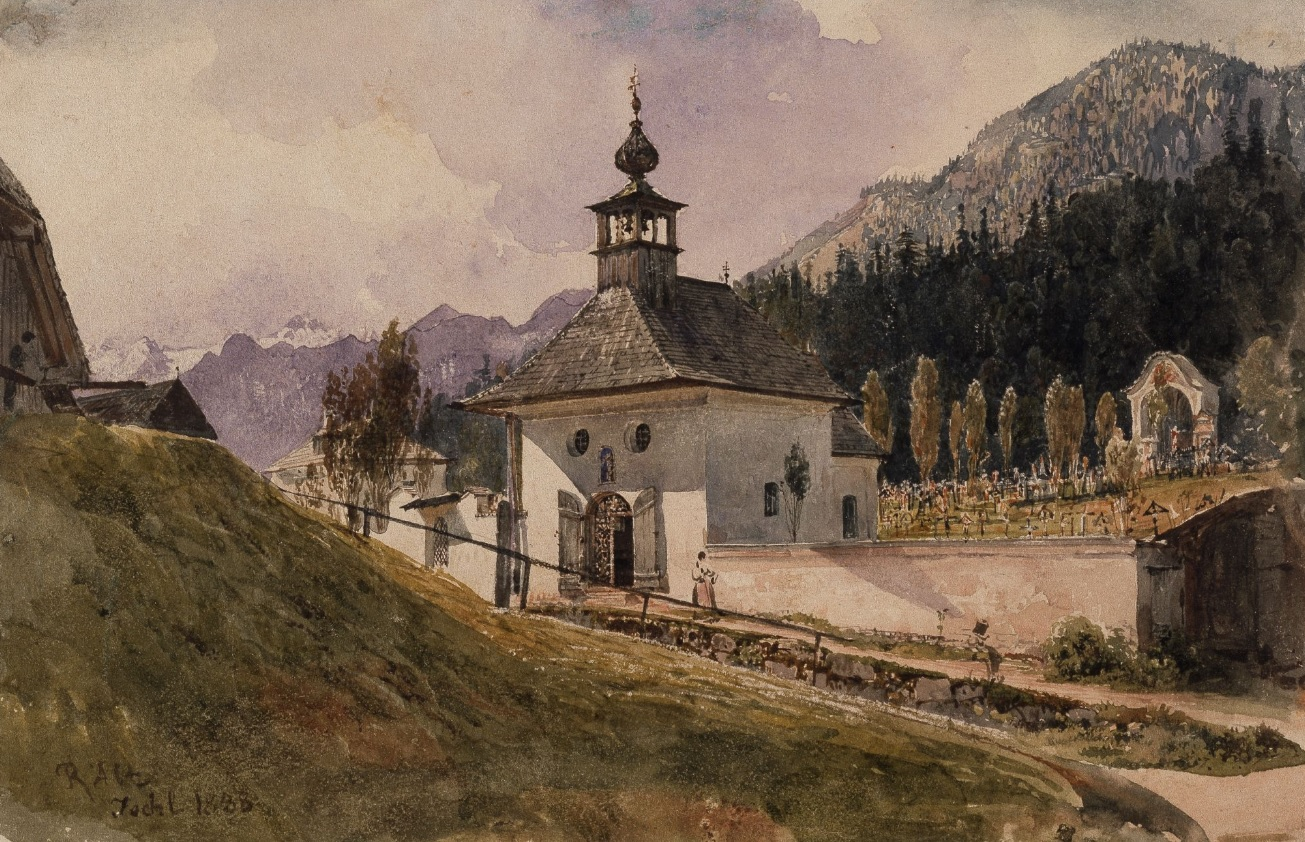
The cemetery and Sebastiankapelle depicted in 1838 by Rudolf von Alt

There are many notable burials in the cemetery, including the writer Hilde Spiel, who once called it "the most beautiful place in the world."

== Notable burials ==
People buried in the Bad Ischl Friedhof include:

- Helmut Berger (1944–2023), actor
- Karl Andreas Bernbrunn (1787–1854), actor and theatre director
- Rudi Gfaller (1882–1972), composer
- Leopold Hasner von Artha (1818–1891), Austrian statesman
- Heinrich Lammasch (1853–1920), jurist and the last Minister-President of Austria
- Franz Lehár (1870–1948), composer
- Stefan Meyer (1872–1949), physicist
- Leo Perutz (1882–1957), writer
- Josef Plieseis (1913–1966), resistance fighter
- Hilde Spiel (1911–1990), writer
- Oscar Straus (1870–1954), composer
- Spas Wenkoff (1928–2013), opera singer
- Therese Wiet (1885–1971), operetta singer

There is also a memorial near the grave of Franz Lehár for the Austrian tenor Richard Tauber (1891–1948) who is buried in London.
