= The Lady in Ermine =

1927 film

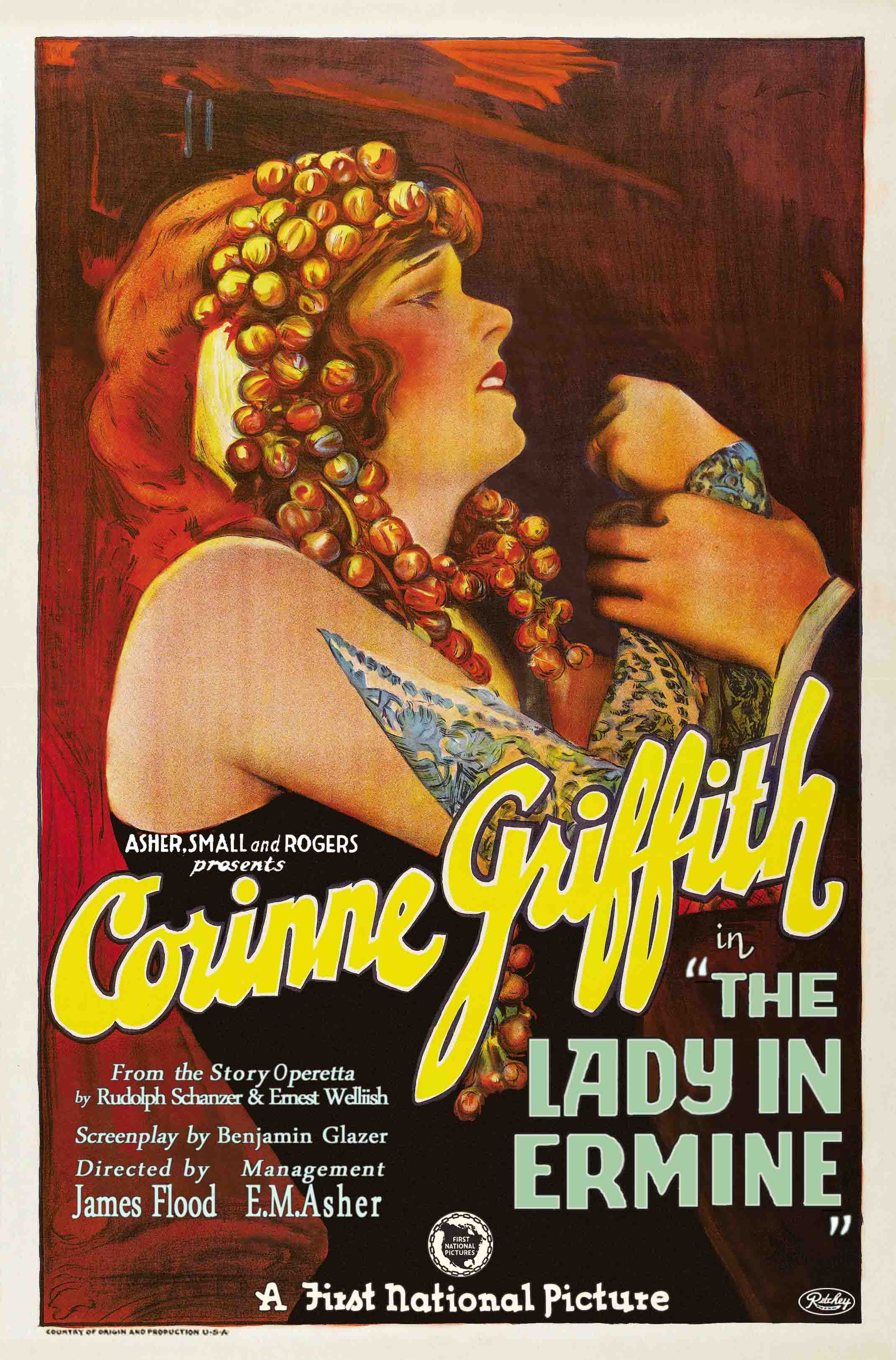
- 1927 theatrical poster
- Directed by: James Flood
- Screenplay by: Benjamin Glazer (adaptation & scenario)
- Based on: Die Frau im Hermelin; 1919 operetta by Ernst Welisch & Rudolph Schanzer
- Produced by: Corinne Griffith
- Starring: Corinne Griffith; Einar Hanson; Francis X. Bushman; Ward Crane
- Cinematography: Harold Wenstrom
- Production company: Corinne Griffith Productions
- Distributed by: First National Pictures
- Release date: January 1, 1927 (United States)
- Running time: 7 reels
- Country: United States
- Language: Silent (English intertitles)

The Lady in Ermine is a 1927 American silent romantic drama film directed by James Flood and produced by and starring Corinne Griffith, and distributed by First National Pictures. The film is now considered a lost film.

== Play ==
The operetta The Lady in Ermine, upon which this film and later films are based, opened on Broadway October 2, 1922 and ran for 238 performances closing on April 21, 1923. It originally played at the Ambassador Theatre and then at the Century Theatre. The famous Shubert Brothers produced the operetta/play.

== Cast ==
- Corinne Griffith as Mariana Beltrami
- Einar Hanson as Adrian Murillo
- Ward Crane as Archduke Stephan
- Francis X. Bushman as Gen. Dostal
- Jane Keckley as Mariana's maid
- Bert Sprotte as Sergeant Major (uncredited)

== Remakes ==
The story was remade as an early talkie musical in Technicolor, Bride of the Regiment (1930), also released by First National and also considered a lost film. It was remade again in 1948 by 20th Century-Fox as That Lady in Ermine, starring Betty Grable and Douglas Fairbanks, Jr.

== See also ==
- Francis X. Bushman filmography
- List of lost films
