= Bride of the Regiment =

1930 film

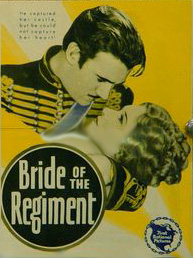
- Theatrical release poster
- Directed by: John Francis Dillon
- Screenplay by: Ray Harris; Humphrey Pearson
- Based on: The Lady in Ermine (stage musical, 1922) by Frederick Lonsdale and Cyrus Wood, based on Die Frau im Hermelin (operetta) by Rudolph Schanzer and Ernst Welisch
- Produced by: Robert North
- Starring: Vivienne Segal; Allan Prior; Walter Pidgeon; Myrna Loy
- Cinematography: Devereaux Jennings; Charles Edgar Schoenbaum
- Edited by: LeRoy Stone
- Music by: Edward Ward
- Color process: Technicolor Process 3
- Production company: First National Pictures
- Distributed by: Warner Bros. Pictures
- Release date: May 21, 1930
- Running time: 81 minutes
- Country: United States
- Language: English

Bride of the Regiment (also known as The Lady of the Rose in the UK) is a 1930 American pre-Code musical film directed by John Francis Dillon and filmed entirely in Technicolor. The screenplay by Ray Harris and Humphrey Pearson is based on the book of the 1922 stage musical The Lady in Ermine by Frederick Lonsdale and Cyrus Wood, which had been adapted from the 1919 operetta Die Frau im Hermelin by Rudolph Schanzer and Ernst Welisch. The story is a remake of a 1927 First National silent film, The Lady in Ermine, that starred Corinne Griffith. It was later remade by 20th Century-Fox as That Lady in Ermine (1948) starring Betty Grable and Douglas Fairbanks Jr.

== Plot ==
During a period in which Austria controlled Italy, during the Austro-Italian War of 1830, Colonel Vultow, leader of Austrian cavalry regiment, is sent to Italy to put down a revolt led by the Lombardian aristocracy. Vultow decides to go to the castle of Count Adrian Beltrami, played by Allan Prior, one of the leaders of the revolution. This happens to be Beltrami's wedding day. As he is emerging from the church following his wedding to Countess Anna-Marie, Beltrami learns that Colonel Vultow is quickly approaching the town in search of him. At the behest of his bride, Beltrami flees the castle, but he asks Tangy, a silhouette cutter, to impersonate him and protect Anna-Marie. When Adrian returns in disguise, he is introduced to Vultow as a singer and silhouette cutter, and when the count demands for him create a silhouette, he enlists Tangy's aid. The deception is discovered, and Vultow sentences Adrian to death by a firing squad unless Anna-Marie submits to his sexual demands.

Eager to save her husband, Anna-Marie shows a portrait of her great-grandmother to Vultow and explains why the woman is wearing only an ermine cloak. Her ancestor once killed a man to protect her honor, and the countess fears she will be forced to do the same. The painting comes to life and Anna-Marie's great-grandmother steps down from the frame and embraces Vultow, now drunk on champagne. He falls asleep and dreams Anna-Marie willingly gives herself to him, and when he awakens, he orders Adrian to be freed in the mistaken belief Anna-Marie is now his. When Vultow receives news that the Italian troops are advancing, he departs, and the count and countess are reunited.

=== Pre-Code sequences ===
The film was full of so much Pre-Code humor that it ran into censorship problems in many areas. The film drew large crowds in Chicago where it played as an "Adults Only" feature. The soundtrack reveals some amazingly suggestive dialogue. In one sequence, Myrna Loy (playing a depraved dancer named Sophie) finds out Vultow (Walter Pidgeon) who had previously fallen for her charms and had sex with her has met with Anna-Marie (Vivienne Segal) and fallen for her charms and has completely forgotten about her. Sophie declares "I'll get him back! I'll dance until his blood is steaming!" and proceeds to begin a smoldering dance number on top of a long dinner table in a very seductive manner in an attempt to lure back Vultow from the charms of Anna-Marie. In another scene, Vultow has a conversation with Anna-Marie. He believes he has had sexual relations with her during the previous night. In reality, however, he dozed off after drinking too much liquor and dreamed the entire episode. The conversation runs as follows:

Vultow: "Have you learned that sometimes defeat can be sweet? That even surrender may have its, umm, compensation?
Anna-Marie: "I've learned how a gallant soldier, umm, conducts himself in victory"
Vultow: Merely a question of practice, my dear."
Anna-Marie: "Ha Ha."
Vultow: "My victories have been numerous."
Anna-Marie: "Really?"

== Cast ==
- Vivienne Segal as Countess Anna-Marie
- Allan Prior as Count Adrian Beltrami
- Walter Pidgeon as Colonel Vultow
- Louise Fazenda as Teresa, The Maid
- Myrna Loy as Sophie
- Lupino Lane as Sprotti
- Ford Sterling as Tangy, Silhouette Cutter
- Harry Cording as Sgt. Dostal
- Claude Flemming as Capt. Stogan
- Herbert Clark as The Prince

== Songs ==
- "Broken-Hearted Lover" (Sung by Allan Prior)
- "Dream Away" (Sung by Walter Pidgeon and Vivienne Segal)
- "When Hearts Are Young" (Sung by Walter Pidgeon and Extras)
- "In a Gypsy Camp" (Danced by Myrna Loy)
- "Shrimp's Dance" (Danced by Lupino Lane)
- "Soldier Song" (Sung by Walter Pidgeon and Soldiers)
- "You Still Retain That Girlish Figure" (Sung by Lupino Lane and Louise Fazenda)

== Production ==
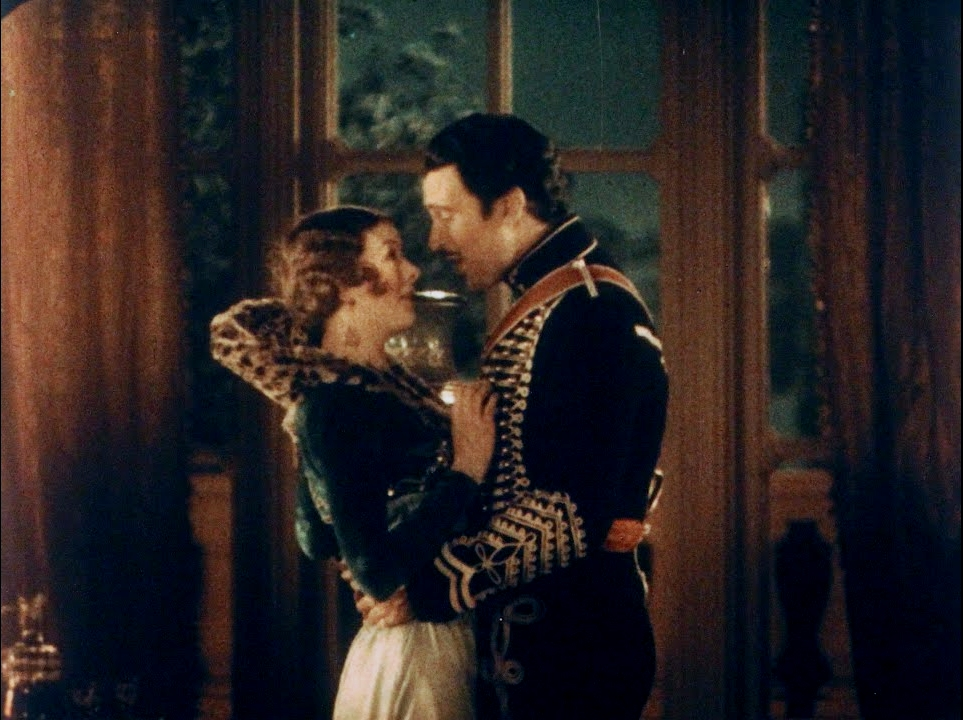
Myrna Loy and Walter Pidgeon in Bride of the Regiment (1930)

The film is notable as the first Technicolor feature to include an outdoor sequence filmed at night, a difficult task due to the lighting that was necessary for Technicolor photography at that time. No expense was spared on the lavish gowns and sets and two thousand extras are reported to have been in the production. Aside from one tune retained from the original stage production - "When Hearts Are Young" - the songs for the film were composed by Edward Ward and Al Bryan. The film differed from most film operettas of the time in that its musical numbers, various comic bits, and even a few characters are unrelated to the basic plot. No complete prints of the film are known to exist.

== Critical reception ==
The quality and beauty of the Technicolor photography was universally praised. One reviewer proclaimed that it was "one of the most thrilling and at the same time pictorially beautiful picture that has reached the screen for a long time. The color is clear, brilliant and remarkable for its depth, giving an illusion of third dimension." Another reviewer noted the "beautiful indoor shots and the brilliance of its parade of costumes."

Mordaunt Hall of The New York Times observed, "The dialogue here may be suited to an operetta on the stage, but it is scarcely suited to scenes in a picture ... As one witnesses the scenes being unfurled, it seems as though the actors were enjoying this film so much they did not care whether audiences found it entertaining or not."

== Preservation ==
The only known surviving fragment is a 20-second-long clip found in 2023. The large amount of Pre-Code content, which raised alarm even before the Code began to be enforced in 1934, may have contributed to the film's disappearance. The film would have been unacceptable for re-release by Associated Artists Productions in 1958 when a number of early Technicolor features were transferred to black-and-white film. The soundtrack, which was recorded on Vitaphone disks, survives intact.

== See also ==
- List of lost films
- List of incomplete or partially lost films
- List of early color feature films
- List of early Warner Bros. sound and talking features
