= Nickel (surname) =

Nickel is a German surname. Notable people with the surname include:

== People ==
- Arno Nickel (born 1952), German correspondence chess Grandmaster
- Barbara Nickel (born 1966), Canadian poet
- Bernd Nickel (1949–2021), German former footballer
- Eckhart Nickel (born 1966), German author and journalist
- Elbie Nickel (1922–2007), American National Football League tight end
- Ernest Henry Nickel (1925-2009), Australian-Canadian mineralogist
- Gil Nickel (1939-2003), American vintner
- Goschwin Nickel (1582–1644), Jesuit priest and the 10th Superior-General of the Society of Jesus
- Grace Nickel (born 1956), Canadian artist
- Günther Nickel (born 1946), Olympic athlete
- Hans Nickel (1907), German rower
- Harald Nickel (1953–2019), German former footballer
- Heinrich Nickel (1894-1979), German general
- Herman W. Nickel (born 1928), United States Ambassador to South Africa during the Reagan administration
- Horst Nickel (1934–2023), German biathlete
- James Nickel (1930–1990), Canadian canoeist
- Jens Nickel (born 1965), German ten-pin bowler
- Jochen Nickel (born 1959), German actor
- Johann Heinrich Nickel (1829–1908), German politician
- Larry Nickel (born 1952), Canadian composer
- Mike Nickel (born 1965), Canadian politician
- Rafael Nickel (born 1958), Olympic athlete
- Richard Nickel (1928–1972), American photographer and historian
- Tyler Nickel (born 2003), American basketball player
- Uta Nickel (born 1941), German politician
- Walter R. Nickel (1907–1989), American dermatologist
- Wiley Nickel (born 1975), American attorney and politician

== Fictional characters ==
- Nomi Nickel, from Miriam Toews's novel A Complicated Kindness
