= Madame Pompadour (operetta) =

Operetta by Leo Fall, Rudolph Schanzer and Ernst Welisch

- Operetta by Leo Fall
- Cover of the vocal score
- Librettist: Rudolph Schanzer; Ernst Welisch
- Premiere: 9 September 1922; Berliner Theater, Berlin

Madame Pompadour is an operetta in three acts, composed by Leo Fall with a libretto by Rudolph Schanzer and Ernst Welisch. Conducted by the composer, it opened at the Berliner Theater in Berlin on 9 September 1922 and then at the Theater an der Wien in Vienna on 2 March 1923.

Translated into English, Madame Pompadour premiered at Daly's Theatre, London, on 20 December 1923. It was also translated into Italian and performed at the Teatro Dal Verme in Milan on 15 January 1924. It was later given in French in an adaptation by Albert Willemetz, Max Eddy and Jean Marietti, in Paris at the Théâtre Marigny on 16 May 1930. With the extraordinary success of the operetta in Berlin, Vienna, London and elsewhere, Fall regained the international fame that he had enjoyed prior to World War I. He died of cancer two years later at the age of only 52.

== Roles ==
Roles, voice types, premiere cast
Role	Voice type	Premiere cast, 9 September 1922 Conductor: Leo Fall
Madame de Pompadour	soprano	Fritzi Massary
Louis XV	baritone	Ernst Rollé
René, comte d'Estrades	tenor	Erik Wirl
Josef Calicot	tenor	Ralph Arthur Roberts
Belotte	soprano	Mimi Vesely
Maurepas, Minister of Police	baritone	
Poulard, his assistant	tenor	
Collin, Pompadour's chamberlain	tenor	
Boucher, court painter	bass	
Tourelle, porcelain manufacturer	bass	
Austrian Ambassador	tenor	
Madeleine, Comtesse D'estrades	contralto	
Lieut. Corneille, in command of the guard		
Prunier, landlord of the "Nine Muses"		

== Synopsis ==
Married Count René is in Paris for Carnival, at an inn with his friend, the poet Josef. When René picks up an attractive girl, she is revealed to be Madame de Pompadour, and he is placed under arrest. She gains him a reprieve, but she demands that he serve as her personal bodyguard and that Josef write a birthday play. She tells René to keep his distance – until midnight. Meanwhile, René's wife arrives, in search of her missing husband, and Louis XV wants to catch his mistress together with her lover. But clever Madame Pompadour is able to avoid detection, as she presents René's wife as her sister.

== English adaptations ==
The first English adaptation, by Frederick Lonsdale and Harry Graham (lyrics), which opened at Daly's Theatre in London in 1923, ran for a very successful 469 performances. It starred Bertram Wallis as Louis XV, Derek Oldham as René, Huntley Wright as Joseph Calicott and Evelyn Laye in the title role.

A second English adaptation, in two acts, with a libretto adapted by Clare Kummer and lyrics by Rudolph Schanzer and Ernst Welisch, was produced on Broadway in 1924–25, starring Wilda Bennett. This was the opening production of the new Martin Beck Theatre. Following the success of the London production, film and other versions were made.

== Musical numbers (English adaptation) ==
Act 1

- Introduction and ensemble (Calicot and Chorus)
- Quintet (René and Girls) – "Carnival Time" ("Laridi, laridon! At carnivals the world must have a gay time")
- Duet (Pompadour & Mariette) – "Love me Now" ("I feel so excited, I won't deny")
- Duet (Pompadour and René) – "By the Light of the Moon" ("Grant favour, In that arbour your heart will grow braver")
- Duet (Calicot and Mariette) – "If I were King" ("Though I'd feel a trifle strange")
- Finale act 1

Act 2

- Introduction and ensemble
- Duet (Pompadour and René) – "Love's Sentry" ("Sentry 'shun, you're on parade now")
- Sextet (Pompadour, Mariette, Madeleine and Three Maids) – "Tell me what your eyes were made for"
- Serenade (René and Chorus of Soldiers) – "Madame Pompadour"
- Duet (Pompadour and Calicot) – "Joseph!" ("Mine's a mad infatuation")
- Reminiscence ... "Madame Pompadour"
- Finale act 2

Act 3

- Introduction
- Duet (Calicot and Mariette) – "Two Little Birds" ("Though you're a girl I've gone simply mad about")
- Finale act 3

== Recordings ==
- 2014: Annette Dasch (Pompadour), Mirko Roschkowski (René), Boris Pfeifer (Josef), Heinz Zednik (Louis XV); conducted by Andreas Schüller, Vienna Volksoper (in German), CPO Cat.: 777795
