= Strand Theatre, Toowoomba =

Strand Theatre
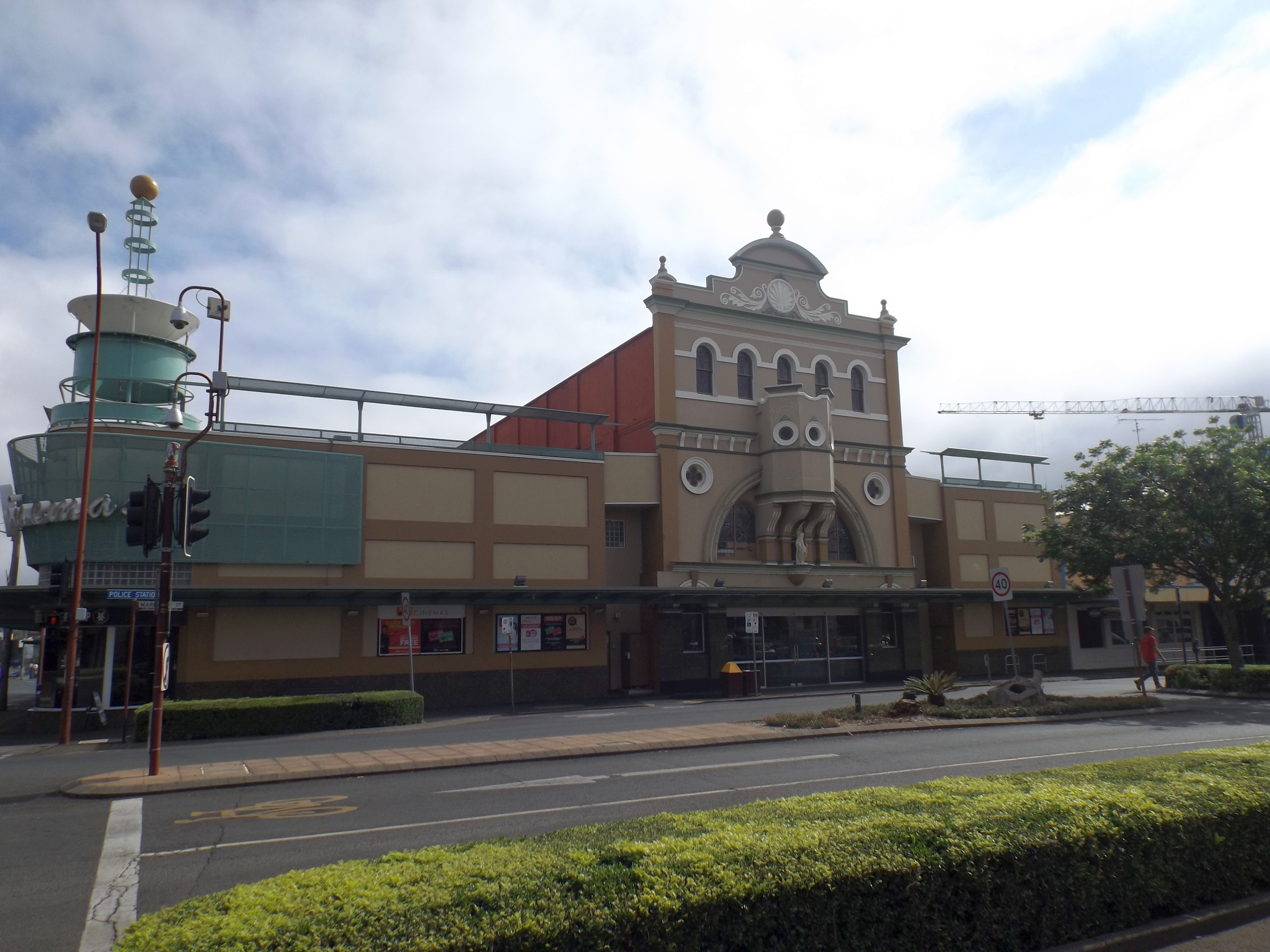
- Margaret Street side, 2014

- Location within Queensland Location within Australia
- 27.5611°S 151.9559°E
- Location: 159–167 Margaret Street, Toowoomba City, Toowoomba, Toowoomba Region, Queensland, Australia

History
- Design period: 1914–1919 (World War I)
- Built: 1915–1933

Site notes
- Architect: George Henry Male Addison

Queensland Heritage Register
- Official name: Strand Theatre
- Type: state heritage (built)
- Designated: 21 October 1992
- Reference no.: 600849
- Significant period: 1915–1916, 1933 (fabric); 1916–1992 (social)
- Significant components: proscenium arch, stage/sound shell, auditorium
- Builders: Luke Halley

Strand Theatre is a heritage-listed cinema at 159–167 Margaret Street, Toowoomba, Queensland, Australia. It was designed by George Henry Male Addison and built from 1915 to 1933 by Luke Halley. It was added to the Queensland Heritage Register on 21 October 1992.

== History ==
This three-storeyed brick picture theatre was erected in 1915–16 for James Patrick Newman, a Toowoomba City alderman.

It was constructed during the early and enthusiastic adoption of cinema by Australian audiences in the first two decades of the 20th century, when the new nation boasted a truly vibrant local film industry which competed healthily with imported British and American product. Its construction was illustrative of the early 20th century attempt to legitimise cinema as a respectable middle-class entertainment in Australia.

In 1915 Newman commissioned established Brisbane architect George Henry Male Addison to design a picture theatre on a site in Margaret Street adjoining the Crown Hotel. This site had operated as the Crystal Palace Picture Gardens since early 1914. Addison called tenders in July 1915, and the contract was awarded to Luke Halley.

The American-derived design was similar to picture theatres erected in other Australian cities during the 1910s. In particular, the large semi-circular glazed arch was reminiscent of the Majestic (1912) and Britannia (1913) in Melbourne and the Pavilion (1913) in Brisbane. It was, however, unorthodox in that the top level was designed as additional accommodation for the Crown Hotel, which was also owned by JP Newman. This third storey was accessed via a staircase from the hotel.

Newman leased the theatre to moving picture exhibitor Senora Spencer, who named the venue the Strand, like her theatres in Brisbane and Newcastle. The first screening, which was accompanied by the Strand Symphony Orchestra and an opening ceremony performed by the Mayor of Toowoomba Alfred McWaters, took place on the evening of Saturday 15 April 1916. The program on the opening night consisted of British war correspondent Ellis Ashmead-Barlett's footage from the Gallipoli campaign. The theatre was so packed on the opening night that people had to be turned away, and later an apology was issued by the theatre in local newspaper.

In 1918 the lease was taken over by Union Theatres, an early Australian distribution-exhibition conglomerate, who repainted and redecorated the theatre early in 1919, when the building was closed temporarily during the Spanish influenza epidemic.

From the mid-1920s the Strand was leased by independent exhibitors.

In mid-1930 sound projection equipment was installed and the theatre was host to some of Toowoomba's earliest "talkies".

In 1933 the owners of the Strand arranged with Birch Carroll & Coyle for Sydney architect and theatre designer Guy Crick, who was then designing Toowoomba's rebuilt Empire Theatre for Birch Carroll & Coyle, to revamp the interior of the Strand in art moderne (Art Deco) style. At the same time the first floor foyer and office space was extended to the upper level of a newly constructed two-storeyed building along the east wall.

So popular were movies during the depression that the Strand continued evening screenings throughout the renovations, although most of the daily matinees were cancelled. The newly refurbished theatre was opened officially in early December 1933, with the local newspaper claiming that the Strand was the first picture theatre in Australia to be refitted completely in the art moderne style.

The Strand flourished during the 1930s, proudly advertising "Always first with the latest and the greatest", and screened premier features from Fox, Paramount, Warner Brothers and United Artists to large audiences.

In 1957 the current owners acquired the theatre and introduced a wide screen format, and renovated the main foyer in the 1960s and again in the 1970s.

A major redevelopment of the theatre and the adjoining buildings was completed in 1992. The adjoining Crown Hotel and the amusement centre were demolished and four small cinemas were erected around the original cinema which was stripped of seating and refurbished to become a large foyer for the new cinema complex.

== Description ==
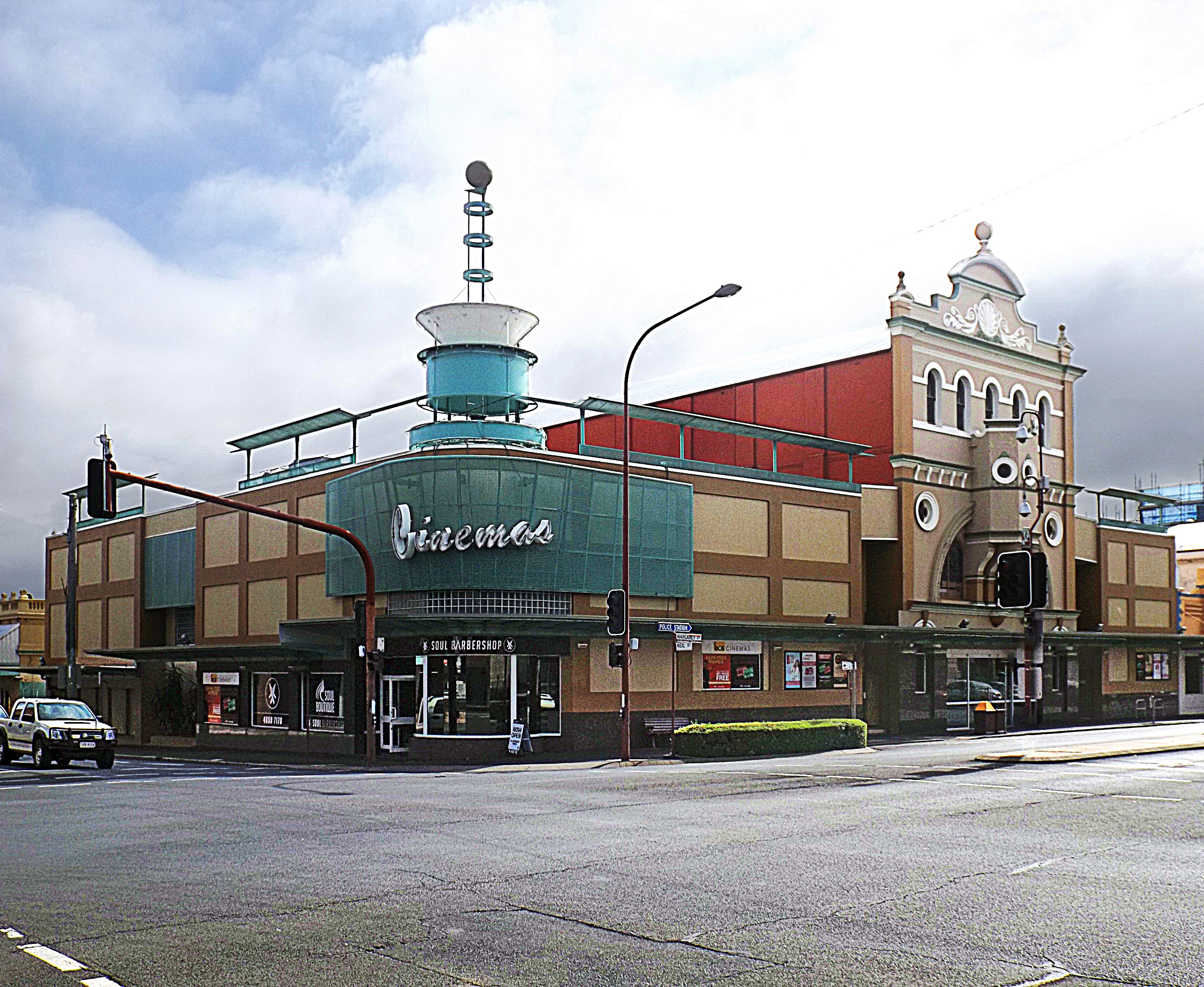
Seen from the corner of Neil Street and Margaret Street, 2014

The Strand Theatre, fronting Margaret Street to the south, is a three-storeyed rendered brick building with a hipped corrugated iron roof concealed behind a shaped gable parapet.

Framed by pilasters, the decorative symmetrical street facade consists of a large semi-circular arch at the first floor level with a quatrefoil window to either side, and is surmounted by a deep cornice, giving the impression of a heightened entrance. This is bisected by a large turret, with three circular leadlight windows, which projects over the entrance and is supported by four large rendered brackets surrounding a statue of a female figure holding a lamp. Lunette windows to either side have leadlight panels.

The second floor has five arched windows with Art Nouveau style leadlight panels, above which is a deep cornice, with rendered relief work to the shaped gable above which is surmounted by three large finials. The street level has display arches either side of the entrance, with a recent cantilevered metal awning above.

Internally, little remains of the 1916 decor apart from the pressed metal ceiling and cornices of the auditorium, tessellated tiling in the ground floor foyer, and the finishes to the former hotel rooms on the second floor. The latter are partitioned in four inch vertical tongue and groove boarding and have pressed metal ceilings. Rooms open off a central corridor previously accessed from the former neighbouring hotel, now demolished. This area is now sealed off. The floor is supported by spanning steel beams which divide the auditorium below into seven bays. The original balcony remains intact although this is now used only as a link between the projection rooms of the new cinema.

Many of the 1933 decorative elements, such as the attached pilasters constructed of rendered canvas over a timber frame, are simply fixed over existing surfaces. Lyrebird motif grilles of gilded timber were adopted to cover the former window openings, and a mechanical ventilation system was installed. Art Deco banding which once surrounded the proscenium remain only as a frieze, following widening of the stage in the late 1950s to accommodate a cinemascope screen. The mezzanine floor foyer features an intact 1933 ceiling and wall grilles.

== Heritage listing ==
Strand Theatre was listed on the Queensland Heritage Register on 21 October 1992 having satisfied the following criteria.

The place is important in demonstrating the evolution or pattern of Queensland's history.

The Strand Theatre at Toowoomba, erected 1915–16, is important in demonstrating the pattern of Queensland's history, in particular the emergence of cinema as a 20th-century social phenomenon.

The place demonstrates rare, uncommon or endangered aspects of Queensland's cultural heritage.

It demonstrates rare and uncommon aspects of Queensland's cultural heritage, in particular as a rare, purpose built picture theatre of the early 20th century, and is important in demonstrating the principal characteristics of early 20th century picture theatres.

The place is important in demonstrating the principal characteristics of a particular class of cultural places.

It demonstrates rare and uncommon aspects of Queensland's cultural heritage, in particular as a rare, purpose built picture theatre of the early 20th century, and is important in demonstrating the principal characteristics of early 20th century picture theatres.

The place is important because of its aesthetic significance.

It is important in exhibiting a range of aesthetic characteristics valued by the Toowoomba community, in particular its prominent siting and contribution through scale, form and materials to the streetscape of Margaret Street and to the Toowoomba townscape; and the quality of its 1930s interior decoration.

The place has a strong or special association with a particular community or cultural group for social, cultural or spiritual reasons.

It has a special association with cinema audiences of Toowoomba and the Darling Downs.

The place has a special association with the life or work of a particular person, group or organisation of importance in Queensland's history.

It has a special association with the work of noted Brisbane architect, GHM Addison, and with important cinema architect, Guy Crick.
