= Fritz Wendhausen =

German actor, screenwriter and film director (1890–1962)

- Born: 7 August 1890; Wendhausen, Germany
- Died: 5 January 1962 (aged 71); Königstein im Taunus, West Germany
- Other names: Frederick Wendhausen, F.R. Wendhausen
- Occupation: Actor
- Spouse(s): Hanna Ralph (m. 19??; div. 19??)

Fritz Wendhausen (7 August 1890 – 5 January 1962) was a German actor, screenwriter and film director. He is also credited as Frederick Wendhausen and F.R. Wendhausen. In 1938 he immigrated to Britain from Nazi Germany.

== Selected filmography ==
Screenwriter

- The Grand Duke's Finances (1924)
- The Trial of Donald Westhof (1927)
- Dreyfus (1930)
- 1914 (1931)
- The Marriage Swindler (1938)

Actor

- Old Heidelberg (1923)
- The First of the Few (1942)
- Secret Mission (1942)
- Tomorrow We Live (1943)
- Beware of Pity (1946)
- Odette (1950)
- Desperate Moment (1953)
- Orders to Kill (1958)

Director

- The Eternal Curse (1921)
- Madame de La Pommeraye's Intrigues (1922)
- The Stone Rider (1923)
- The Director General (1925)
- His Toughest Case (1926)
- The Trial of Donald Westhof (1927)
- Out of the Mist (1927)
- A Woman with Style (1928)
- The Runaway Princess (1929)
- Queen of the Night (1931)
- The First Right of the Child (1932)
- Little Man, What Now? (1933)
- The Black Whale (1934)
- Peer Gynt (1934)
- Artist Love (1935)
- Family Parade (1936)
