= Ralph Benatzky =

Czech-Austrian composer (1884–1957)

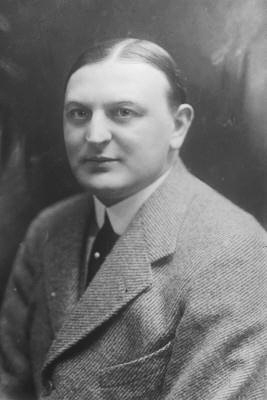
Ralph Benatzky

Ralph Benatzky (5 June 1884 – 16 October 1957) was a Czech-Austrian composer. He composed operas and operettas, such as Casanova (1928), Die drei Musketiere (1929), The White Horse Inn (1930) and Meine Schwester und ich (1930).

== Life ==
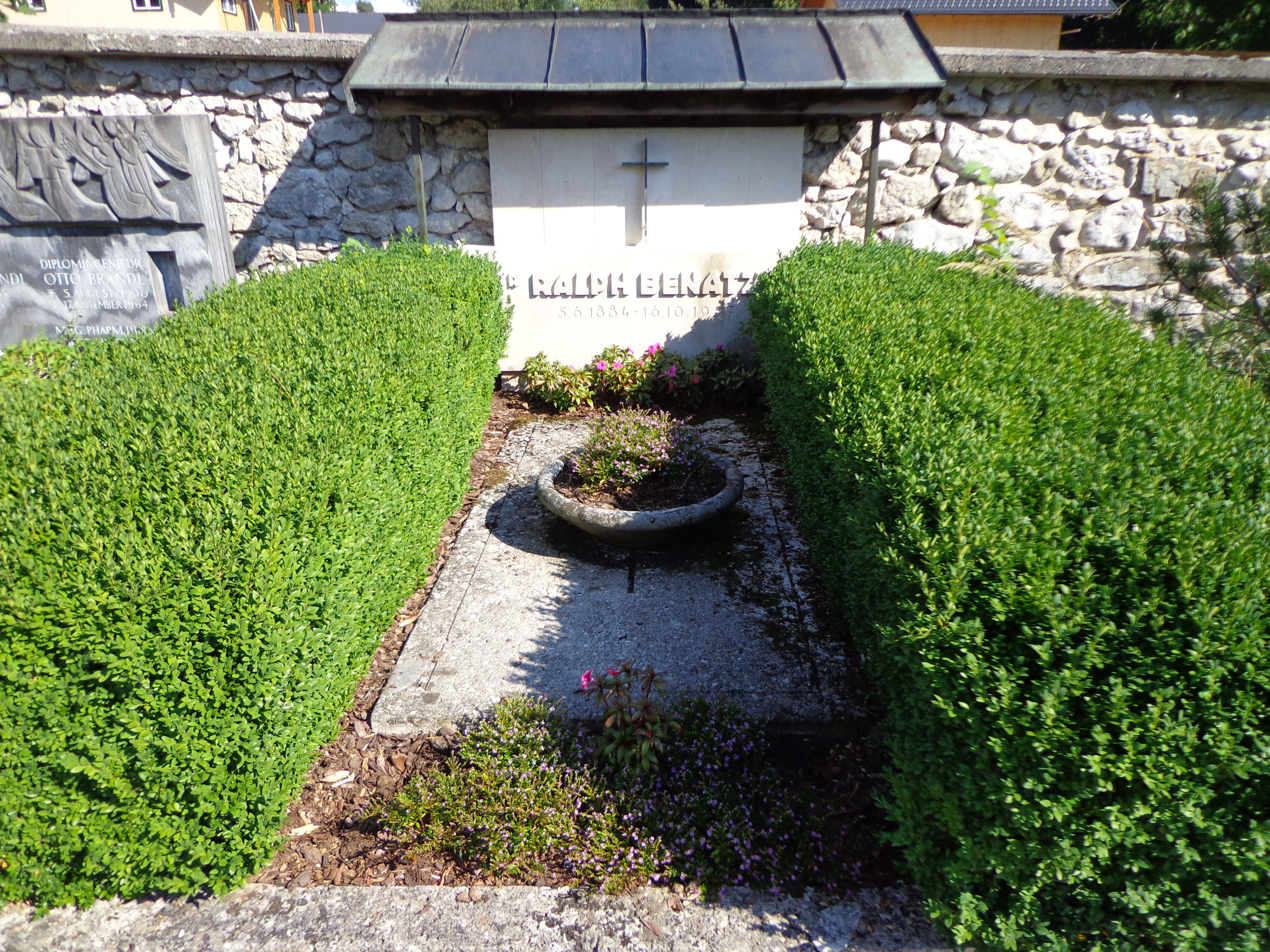
Benatzky's grave in St. Wolfgang im Salzkammergut

He was born Rudolf Josef František (Rudolph Josef Franz) Benatzky on 5 June 1884 in Moravské Budějovice, Moravia, Austria-Hungary. He was born to a Czech mother and ethnically German father, who taught at a German school. From 1899, he studied at a real school in Litoměřice, but was soon expelled. He continued his studies in Vienna. He graduated from German studies at the University of Vienna and received a doctorate in music at the German Charles-Ferdinand University in Prague. He was a pupil of Antonín Dvořák.

His first job after his studies was as a conductor and kapellmeister in Munich, and in the following years he worked in several small cabarets, for which he wrote songs, lyrics and smaller operettas. In 1914, he became the director of the Rideamus cabaret in Vienna. In 1913, his first full-length operetta Der lachende Dreibund premiered in Berlin, but it was not until the operetta Liebe im Schnee, which premiered in Vienna in 1916, that he achieved success. Further successes were the operettas Prinzchens Frühlingserwachen and Yuschi tanzt, performed mainly in Austria. Following their success, he moved from Austria to Berlin in 1930, where he became a popular author of musical comedies. Here he wrote best known works, the operettas The White Horse Inn (1930) and Meine Schwester und ich, which were international success.

Benatzky was twice married to Jewish women: Josma Selim, a singer, and Melanie "Mela" Hoffmann, a dancer. For that reason, Benatzky was often mistakenly referred to as Jewish due to an error published in a book of Jewish musicians during World War II.

Because of his Jewish wife, Benatzky had to leave Germany and went to the United States. Here he also worked in Hollywood, but did not achieve success.

In 1946, after World War II ended, Benatzky returned to Europe and lived in Switzerland. He died on 16 October 1957 in Zurich, aged 73. He is buried in St. Wolfgang im Salzkammergut, Austria, where the plot of his most famous operetta The White Horse Inn takes place.

== Works ==
- Laridon (1911)
- Cherchez la femme (1911)
- Der lachende Dreibund (1913)
- Anno 14 (1914)
- Prinzchens Frühlingserwachen (1914)
- Liebe im Schnee (1916)
- Die tanzende Maske (1918)
- Die Verliebten (1919)
- Apachen (1920)
- Ein Märchen aus Florenz (1923)
- Casanova, with music by Johann Strauss II (1928)
- Die drei Musketiere (1929)
- The White Horse Inn (1930) aka The White Horse Inn
- Meine Schwester und ich (1930)
- Zur goldenen Liebe (1931)
- Zirkus Aimée (1932)
- Büxl (1932)
- Bezauberndes Fräulein (1933)
- Reichste Mann der Welt (1935)
- Der König mit dem Regenschirm (1935)
- Axel an der Himmelstür (1936)
- Majestät privat (1937)
- Herzen im Schnee (1937)
- Der Silberhof (1941)
- Kleinstadt zauber (Zürich, 1947)
- Liebesschule (Göttingen, 1950)
- Mon Ami René (Karlsruhe, 1951)

== Selected filmography ==
- The Last Company (1930)
- The Immortal Vagabond (1930)
- Poor as a Church Mouse (1931)
- Chauffeur Antoinette (1932)
- Her Highness the Saleswoman (1933)
- The Princess's Whim (1934)
- The Fairy Doll (1936)
- Girls' Dormitory (1936)
- To New Shores (1937)
- Such Great Foolishness (1937)
- Love Premiere (1943)
- Back Then (1943)
- White Horse Inn (1948)
- My Sister and I (1950)
- Fiancée for Hire (1950)
- Immortal Light (1951)
- The White Horse Inn (1952)
- The Charming Young Lady (1953)
- My Sister and I (1954)
