= Hallstätter See =

Lake in Salzkammergut, Austria

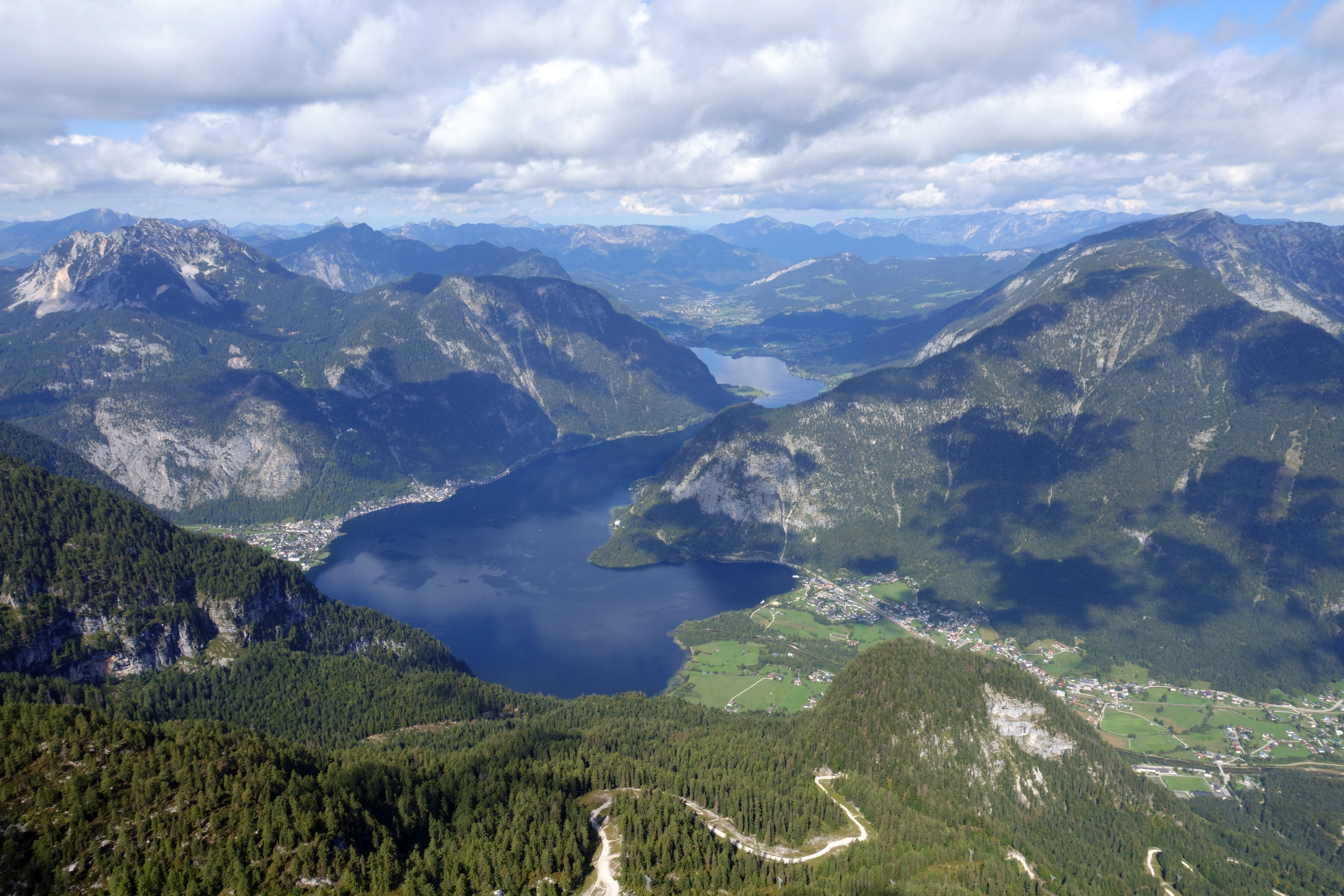

- Location within Austria
- Location: Salzkammergut
- Coordinates: 47°34′43″N 13°39′38″E
- Primary inflows: Traun River
- Primary outflows: Traun River
- Basin countries: Austria
- Max. length: 5.9 km (3.7 mi)
- Max. width: 2.3 km (1.4 mi)
- Surface area: 8.55 km^{2} (3.30 sq mi)
- Max. depth: 125 m (410 ft)
- Surface elevation: 508 m (1,667 ft)
- Settlements: Hallstatt, Bad Goisern, Obertraun

Hallstätter See or Lake Hallstatt is a lake in Salzkammergut, Austria. It is named after Hallstatt, a small market town famous for its salt mining since prehistoric times and for being the starting point of the world's oldest still-working industrial pipeline, used to transport brine to Bad Ischl (since 1596) and further to Ebensee.

Since about 1970/1980 the only ship-mail-line of Austria crossed the lake from the railway on the east shore to the town in the west. In winters the road on the west shore tended to be blocked by high snow or the risk of avalanches. When the ice on the lake was thick enough, a sled pulled by men or horses, later a motorized track vehicle was used to transport mail and persons.

Later a tunneled road was built through Hallstatt and the mail switched to transport by bus and truck.

Its surface is approximately 8.55 km^{2} (3.30 sq mi) and its maximum depth is 125 metres. It is a popular destination for tourists, especially scuba divers.

The fixed exit weir, a 500-year old protected monument, has no bypass and therefore caused the flooding of several houses in Hallstatt on 18 June 2013.

== See also ==
- Hallstatt period
