= Salzkammergut =

Resort area in Austria

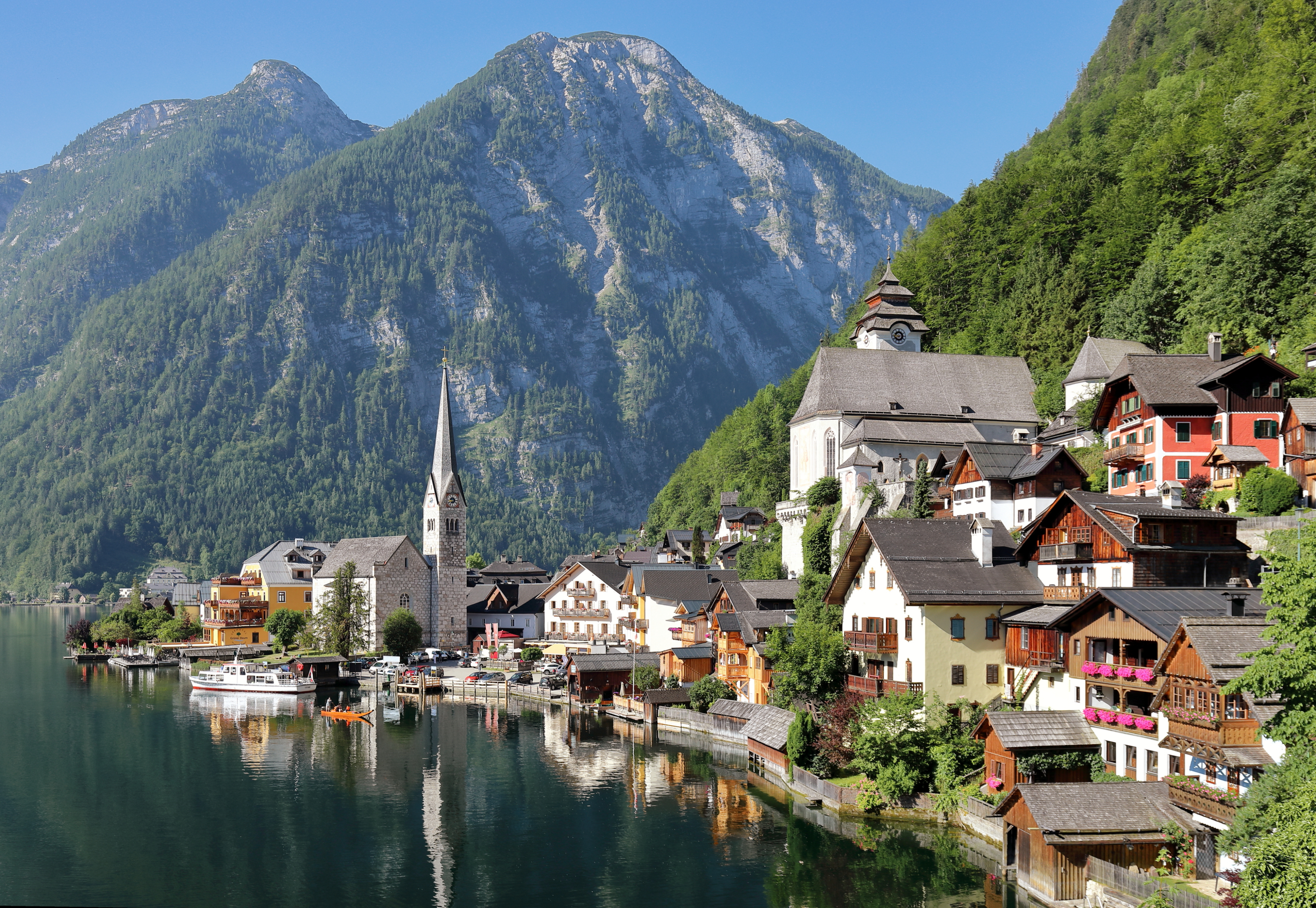
View of Hallstatt

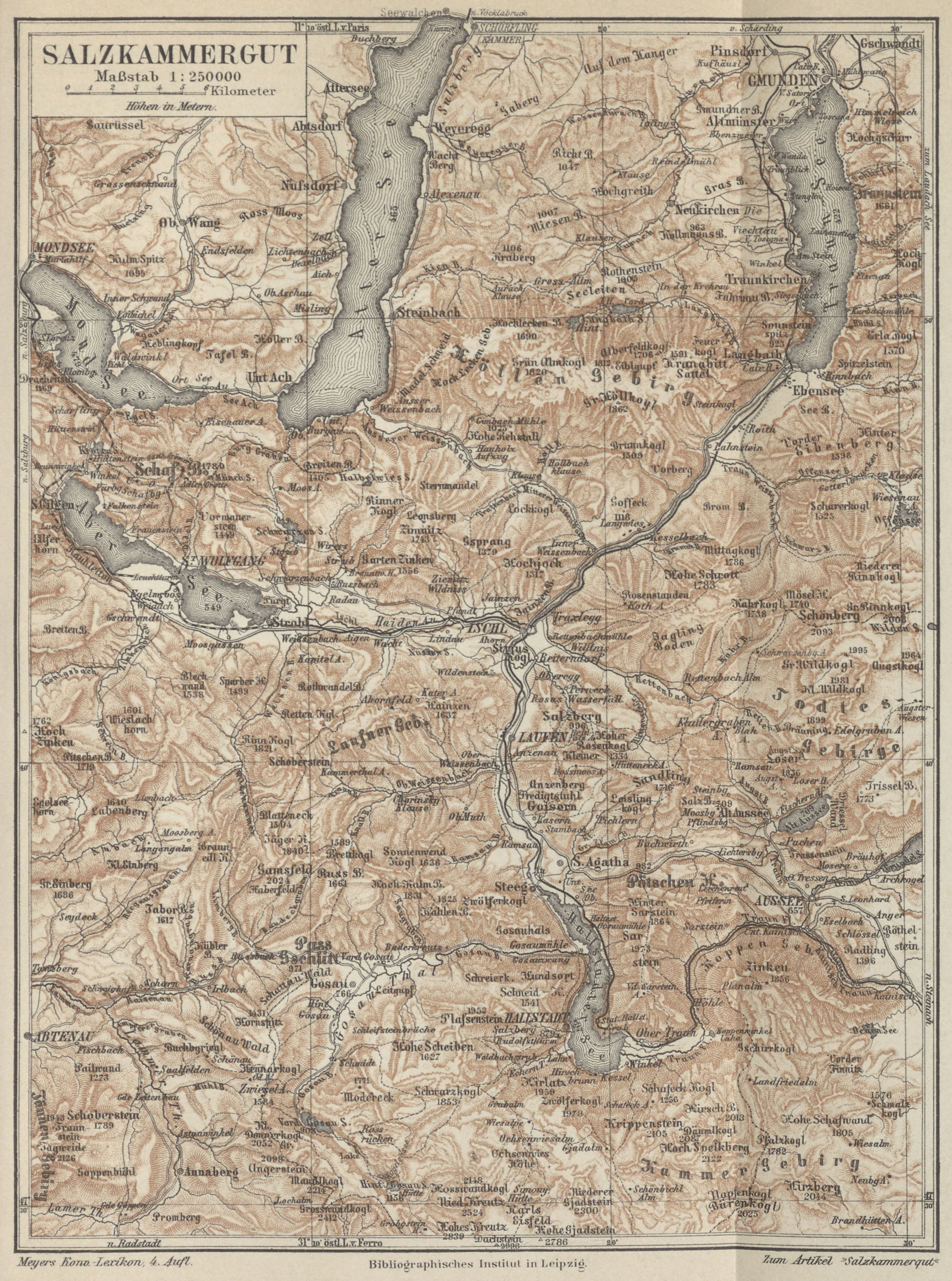
1890 map (from Meyers Konversations-Lexikon 4th ed.), showing the area between c. 47°30′N 13°20′E and 47°55′N 13°50′E, centered on Bad Ischl

The Salzkammergut (Austrian German: [ˈsaltskamɐɡuːt], Northern German: [ˈzaltskamɐɡuːt]; Central Austro-Bavarian: Soizkaumaguad) is a resort area in Austria, stretching from the city of Salzburg eastwards along the Alpine Foreland and the Northern Limestone Alps to the peaks of the Dachstein Mountains. The main river of the region is the Traun, a right tributary of the Danube.

The name Salzkammergut translates to "salt demesne" (or "salt domain"). Kammergut is a German word for territories held by princes of the Holy Roman Empire – in early modern Austria, it specifically refers to territories of the Habsburg monarchy. The salt mines of Salzkammergut were administered by the Imperial Salzoberamt in Gmunden from 1745 to 1850.

Parts of the region were designated a UNESCO World Heritage Site in 1997.

== Geography ==
The lands on the shore of the Traun River comprise numerous glacial lakes and raised bogs, the Salzkammergut Mountains and the adjacent Dachstein Mountains, the Totes Gebirge and the Upper Austrian Prealps with prominent Mt. Traunstein in the east. The towering mountain slopes are characterized by bright limestone (karst) and flysch rocks.

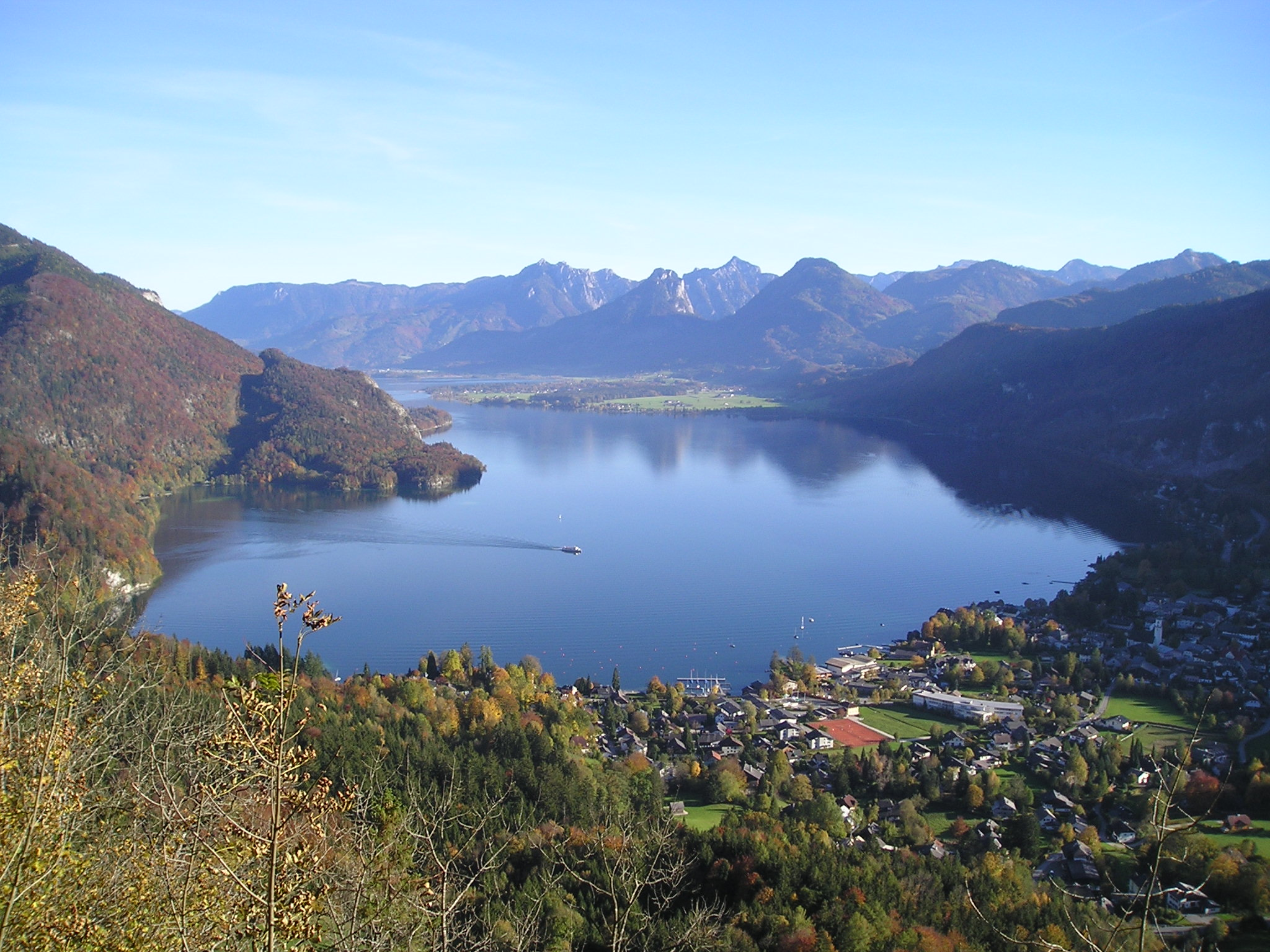
Wolfgangsee with St. Gilgen in the foreground

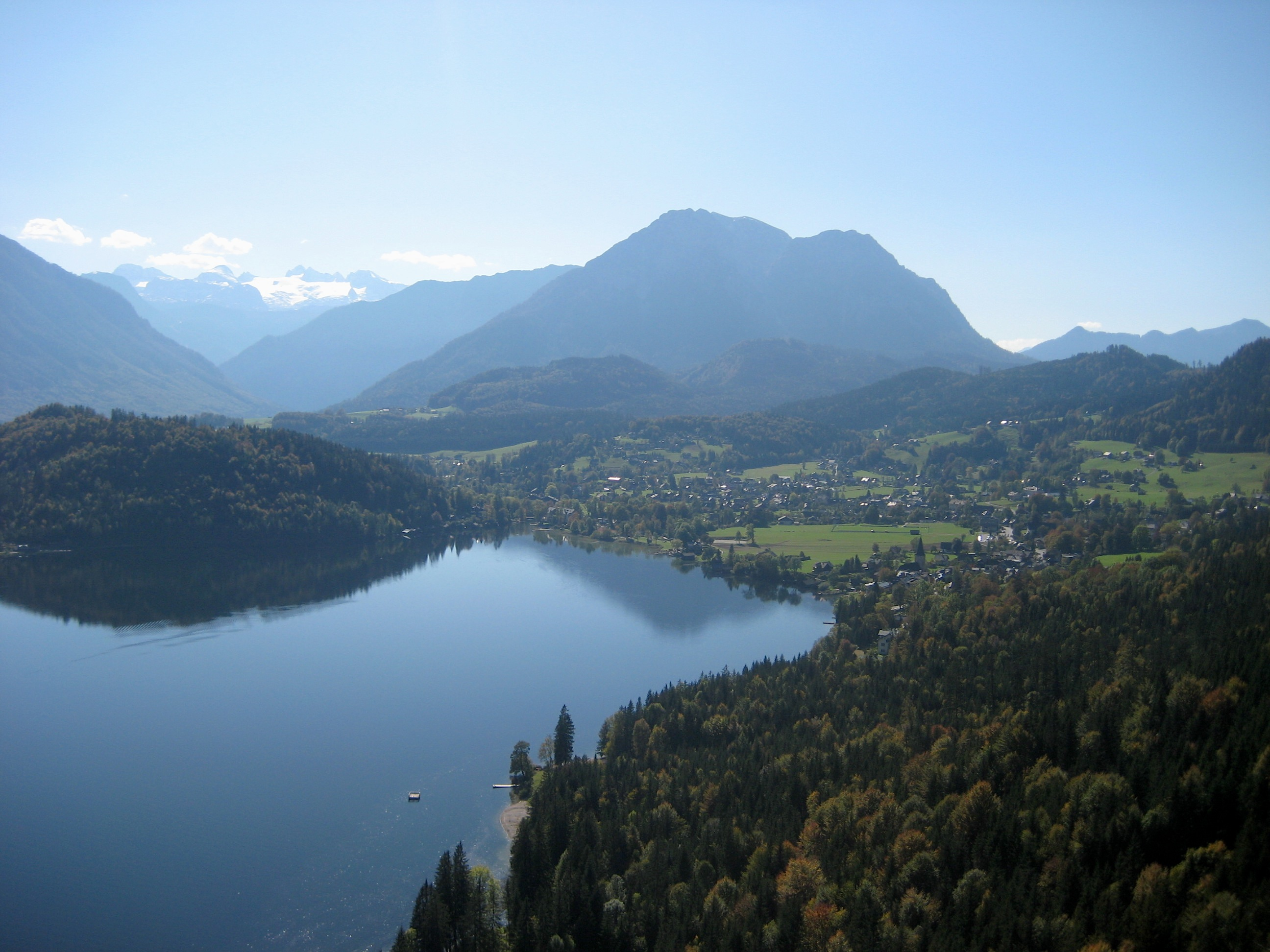
View of the Lake Altaussee and Altaussee, in the background the Hoher Dachstein

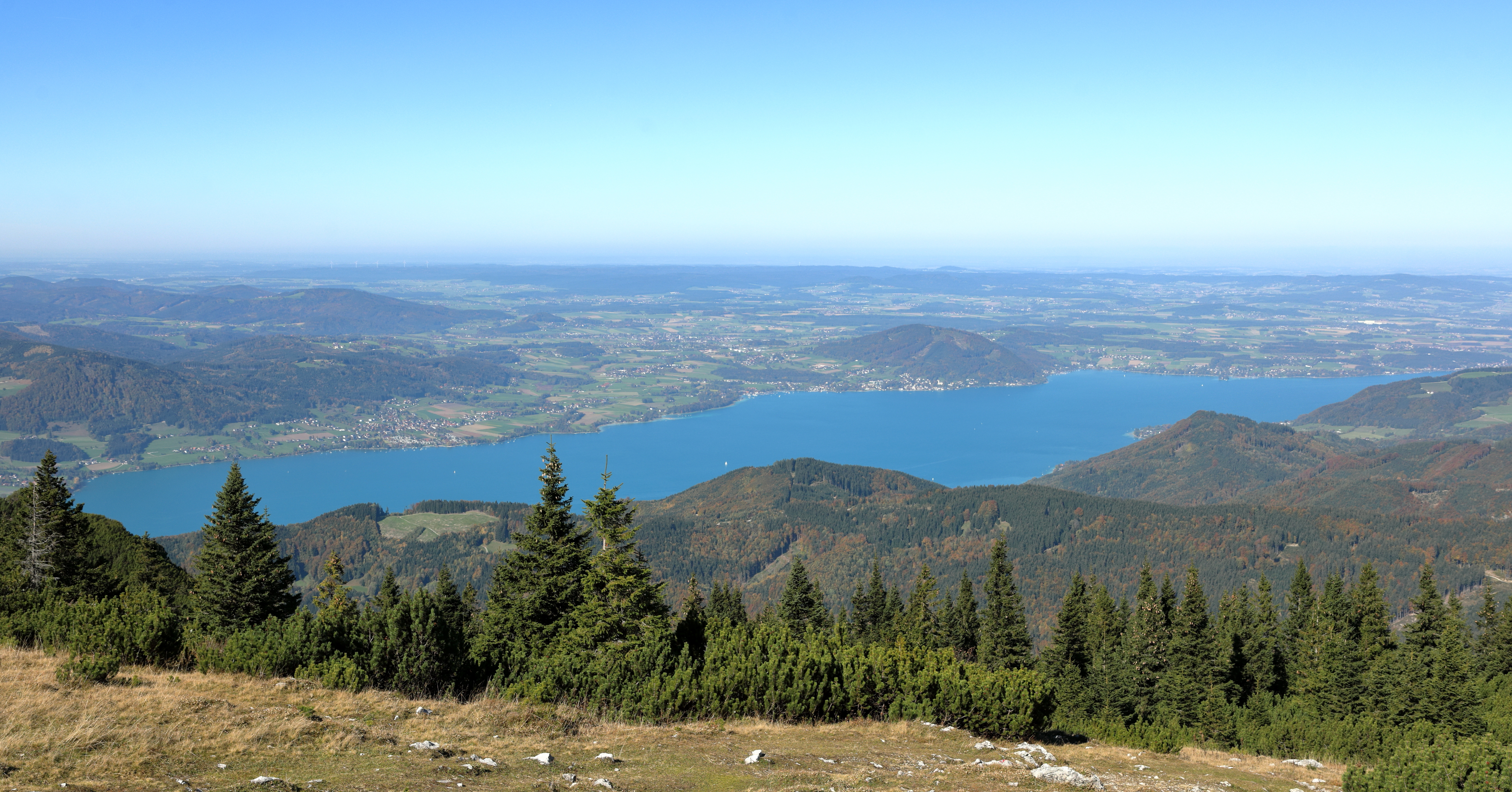
View of the Lake Attersee

Salzkammergut is not an official administrative division of Austria and as such has no clear borders. The historical term referred not to a region but to specific possessions (salt mines) of the Habsburg monarchy within the region. Since 2002, however, there has been a well-defined Tourismusregion Salzkammergut, marketed by Salzkammergut Tourismus-Marketing GmbH, a company located in Bad Ischl. As defined by this company, Salzkammergut as a tourist region includes 58 municipalities in three Austrian states, the majority within Upper Austria (Gmunden and Vöcklabruck districts), besides smaller portions of Styria and Salzburg. Salzkammergut Tourismus-Marketing GmbH divides the Salzkammergut region into ten sub-regions, as follows:

- Ausseerland: Bad Aussee, Styria
- Ferienregion Wolfgangsee: Wolfgangsee, Salzburg
- Urlaubsregion Fuschlsee: Fuschlsee, Salzburg
- Ferienregion Dachstein Salzkammergut: Hallstätter See, Bad Goisern, Hallstatt, Obertraun and Gosau, Upper Austria
- Ferienregion Traunsee: Traunsee, Upper Austria
- Ferienregion Attersee: Attersee, Upper Austria
- MondSeeLand – Mondsee/Irrsee: Mondsee (town), Mondsee, Irrsee, Upper Austria
- Ferienregion Bad Ischl: Bad Ischl, Upper Austria
- Ferienregion Attergau: Attergau, Upper Austria
- Ferienregion Almtal: Almtal, Upper Austria

== History ==
Archaeological findings in the area date back to the Neolithic era, especially the stilt houses of the Mondsee group culture, who settled the region from about 3800 BC onwards. The Germanic name hall of several settlements refers to the region's numerous salt mines, which had been in use at least since the days of the Celtic Hallstatt culture, centered at the mining town of Hallstatt. These operations were continued by the Romans, after the area had been incorporated into the Noricum province in 15 BC. A Roman settlement and salt evaporation pond at Hallstatt is documented about 100, affected by several Germanic invasions after the Marcomannic Wars, until the province was finally evacuated at the behest of the Italian king Odoacer in 488.

From about 530, Bavarii tribes settled the region from the west. They encountered Alpine Slavs who had moved northwards through the Enns Valley and across the Dachstein Mountains. From 900 salt trade is again documented along the Traun River, when the area was part of the Traungau region of the German stem duchy of Bavaria, held by the comital dynasty of the Otakars, who from 1056 also ruled over the neighbouring March of Styria. While most of the Traungau fell to the Babenberg duchy of Austria upon the deposition of the Bavarian duke Henry the Lion in 1180, the southeastern Ausseerland remained with the newly-established Duchy of Styria, which nevertheless from 1192 was held in personal union by the Austrian Babenbergs.

In 1278 King Rudolph I of Germany, a scion of the Swabian House of Habsburg, finally seized both duchies from King Ottokar II of Bohemia, whom he defeated in the Battle on the Marchfeld. Rudolph's son King Albert I of Germany defended his hegemony against the rival Prince-Archbishops of Salzburg to the west and in 1298 made the lands of Ischl a present to his wife Countess Elisabeth of Gorizia-Tyrol. Emperor Maximilian I added to the territory the estates of Mondsee Abbey in 1506.

The Habsburg officials resided at Wildenstein Castle near Ischl and the surrounding estates were designated a Kammergut, as first documented in a 1656 deed. In the 17th century, Ischl and Hallstatt were considered separate Kammergüter. The salt mines were immediate domains of the Habsburg King of the Romans and mining part of his princely regalia. The salt mines were administered by the financial aulic chamber at Vienna, represented by the salt chamber (Salzamt) in Gmunden, established in the 15th century. The Salzkammer in Gmunden was made Salzoberamt by a decree of empress Maria Theresia of 22 May 1745.

The term Salzkammergut dates to this period, during which the Gmunden Salzoberamt was the administrative seat of all salt mines in the region, with subordinate offices at Ischl, Ebensee am Traunsee, Stadl, Lambach, Wels, Zizlau, Enghagen, Mauthausen and Linz. The Salzämter were dissolved in the 19th century. Emperor Franz Joseph I in 1850 transformed the Gmunden Salzoberamt into the k.k. Salinen- und Forstdirektion , the predecessor of the modern Salinen Austria AG (a joint-stock company since 1979, fully privatised in 1997).

== Economy ==
During the time of Emperor Franz Joseph I, the Salzkammergut area was a hub of cultured life. The Emperor spent his summer holidays in Bad Ischl in the Kaiservilla, from which he governed his empire in the warmer months. This was also where he signed the declaration of war with Serbia that started World War I.

The salt mining industry is the namesake of the region, but is today a relatively minor contributor to the local economy. The forest industry is now more important. Industrial sites include Ebensee, Gmunden, Laakirchen and Steyrermühl. The Salzkammergut also profits from its tradition of small businesses and trade companies, many of which originated due to the salt mining.

The unemployment rate was approximately 4.8% in 2005, compared to an overall figure of 7.3% for Austria.

A well-known narrow-gauge railway, the Salzkammergut-Lokalbahn formerly ran from Salzburg to Bad Ischl, but it closed in 1957. A standard gauge railroad continues to run through the region, as well as the Schafbergbahn rack railway in St. Wolfgang.

Recreational facilities include swimming and water sports at the many lakes, mountaineering, cycling and horse riding holidays, winter sports and cultural events. The region owes its reputation as a recreational area not only to its landscape and climate but also to its many spas. It remains a major tourist area despite its age.

Since 2002, the tourism region has marketed itself with the Salzkammergut Tourismus-Marketing GmbH (salzkammergut.at), a holding company of the 54 municipalities of the Salzkammergut that are entitled to use the name “Salzkammergut” as a brand according to the tourism regulations of the three provinces.

== UNESCO World Heritage Site ==
Hallstatt–Dachstein / Salzkammergut Cultural Landscape
UNESCO World Heritage Site
- Location within Austria
- Location: Austria
- Criteria: Cultural: iii, iv
- Reference: 806
- Inscription: 1997 (21st Session)
- Website: whc.unesco.org/en/list/806
- Coordinates: 47°35′N 13°38′E

UNESCO designated "Hallstatt–Dachstein/Salzkammergut Cultural Landscape" (Kulturlandschaft Hallstatt–Dachstein/Salzkammergut) a World Heritage Site in 1997, with the description

"Human activity in the magnificent natural landscape of the Salzkammergut began in prehistoric times, with the salt deposits being exploited as early as the 2nd millennium B.C. This resource formed the basis of the area's prosperity up to the middle of the 20th century, a prosperity that is reflected in the fine architecture of the town of Hallstatt."

The area designated was defined on an area of 284 square kilometres, with a "buffer zone" of another 200 square kilometres. The core zone includes the towns Hallstatt, Obertraun, Gosau and Bad Goisern.

The site sits at the core of interdisciplinary research and is helping to contribute to the understanding of socio-ecological systems and how these might help to address future challenges and the role that archaeologists can play in communicating and engaging with climate change and its impacts.

Federal state	Core zone	Buffer zone
Upper Austria	233.90 km^{2}	54.80 km^{2}
Styria	50.55 km^{2}	119.62 km^{2}
Salzburg	–	25.71 km^{2}
Total	284.46 km^{2}	200.13 km^{2}

== See also ==
- List of World Heritage Sites in Austria
- Wildensee (Salzkammergut)
