= Lehár Villa =

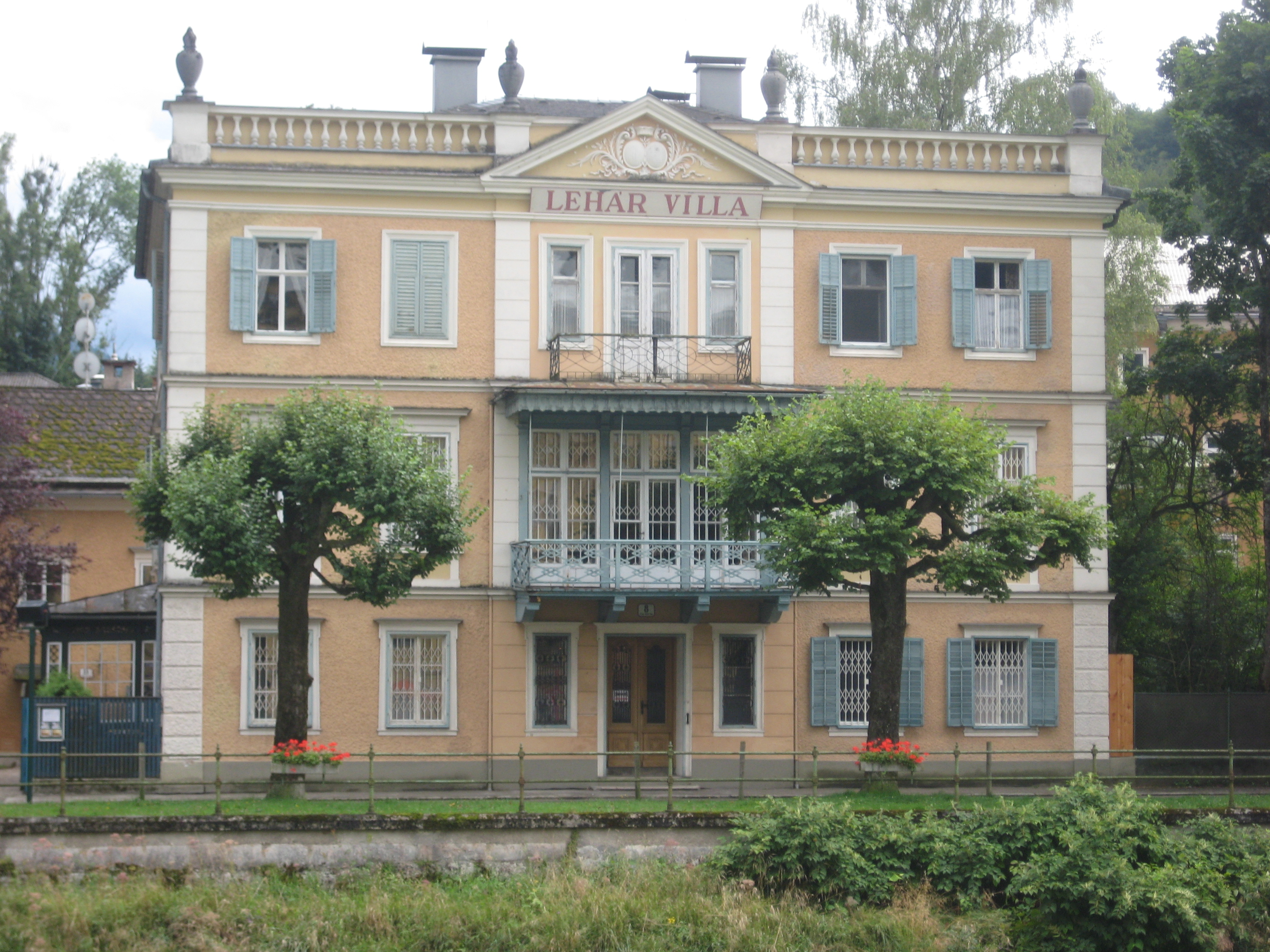
- Interactive map of the Lehár Villa area

General information
- Location: Bad Ischl, Austria
- Coordinates: 47°42′34.6″N 13°37′19.1″E

Website
- https://www.stadtmuseum.at/hg_leharvilla.php

Lehár Villa is a building in Bad Ischl in Upper Austria, on the bank of the River Traun. It was the summer residence of the composer Franz Lehár (1870–1948). Today it is a museum dedicated to the composer.

== Description ==
Lehár bought the villa from the Duchess of Sabran in 1912, and for the rest of his life spent most summers here. He said: "In Ischl I always have my best ideas".

The interior is furnished, as far as possible, as it was when Lehár lived here. Personal memorabilia, and paintings that he collected during his life, can be seen. There is a museum within the building, showing items relating to the life of the composer.

== See also ==
- List of music museums
