= Ödseen =

Bigger Odsee
- Großer Ödsee (German)
- Location within Austria
- Location: Upper Austria
- Group: Ödseen
- Coordinates: 47°45′50″N 14°01′05″E
- Type: Lake

Smaller Odsee
- Kleiner Ödsee (German)
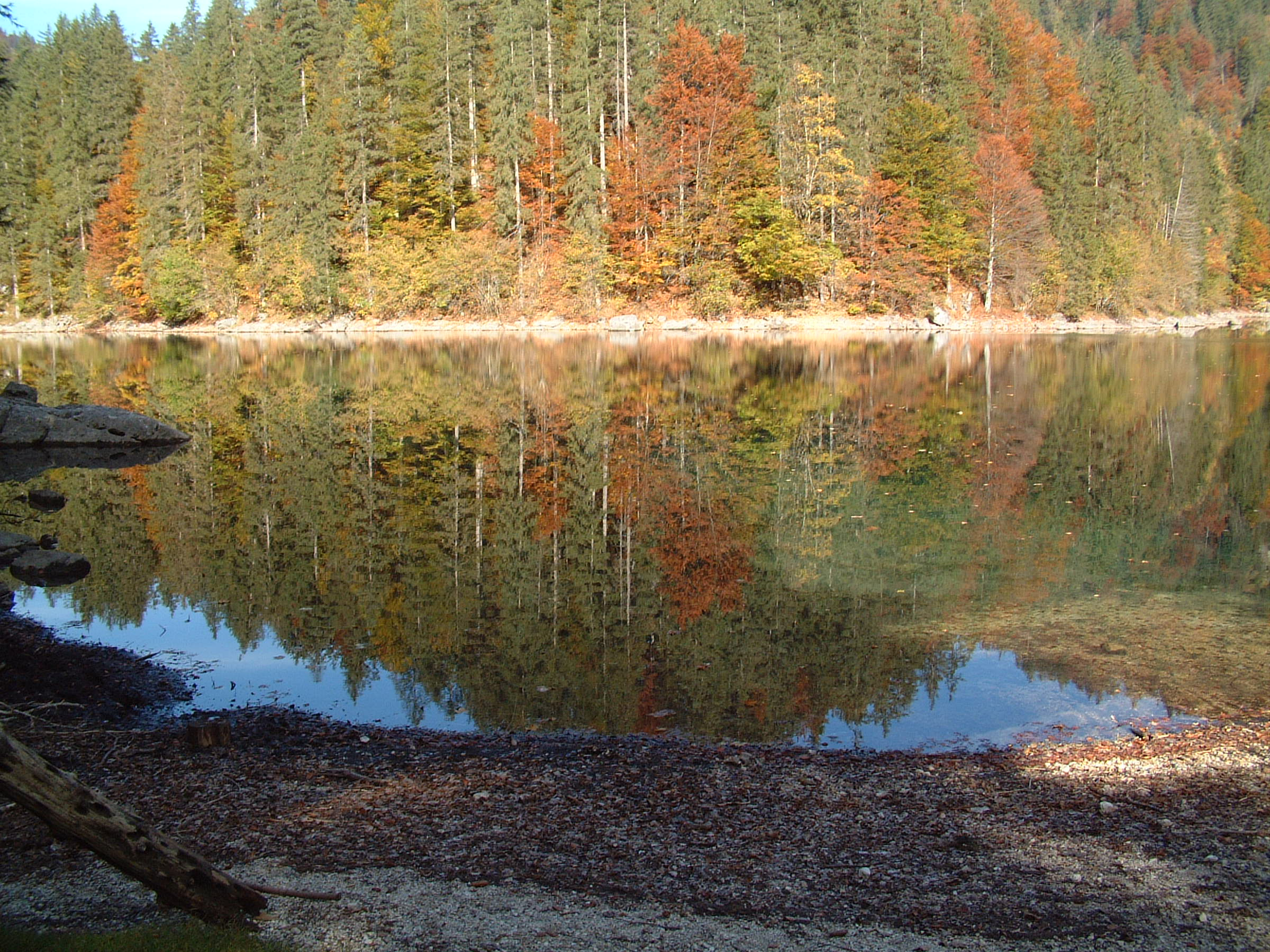

- Location within Austria
- Location: Upper Austria
- Group: Ödseen
- Coordinates: 47°45′34″N 14°01′10″E
- Type: Lake

The Ödseen (bleak lakes) are two small mountain lakes (Großer Ödsee 47°45′50″N 14°01′05″E and Kleiner Ödsee 47°45′34″N 14°01′10″E) in Upper Austria's part of the Salzkammergut.
