= Lauffen, Upper Austria =

Town in Upper Austria, Austria

Coordinates: 47°40′20″N 13°36′58″E

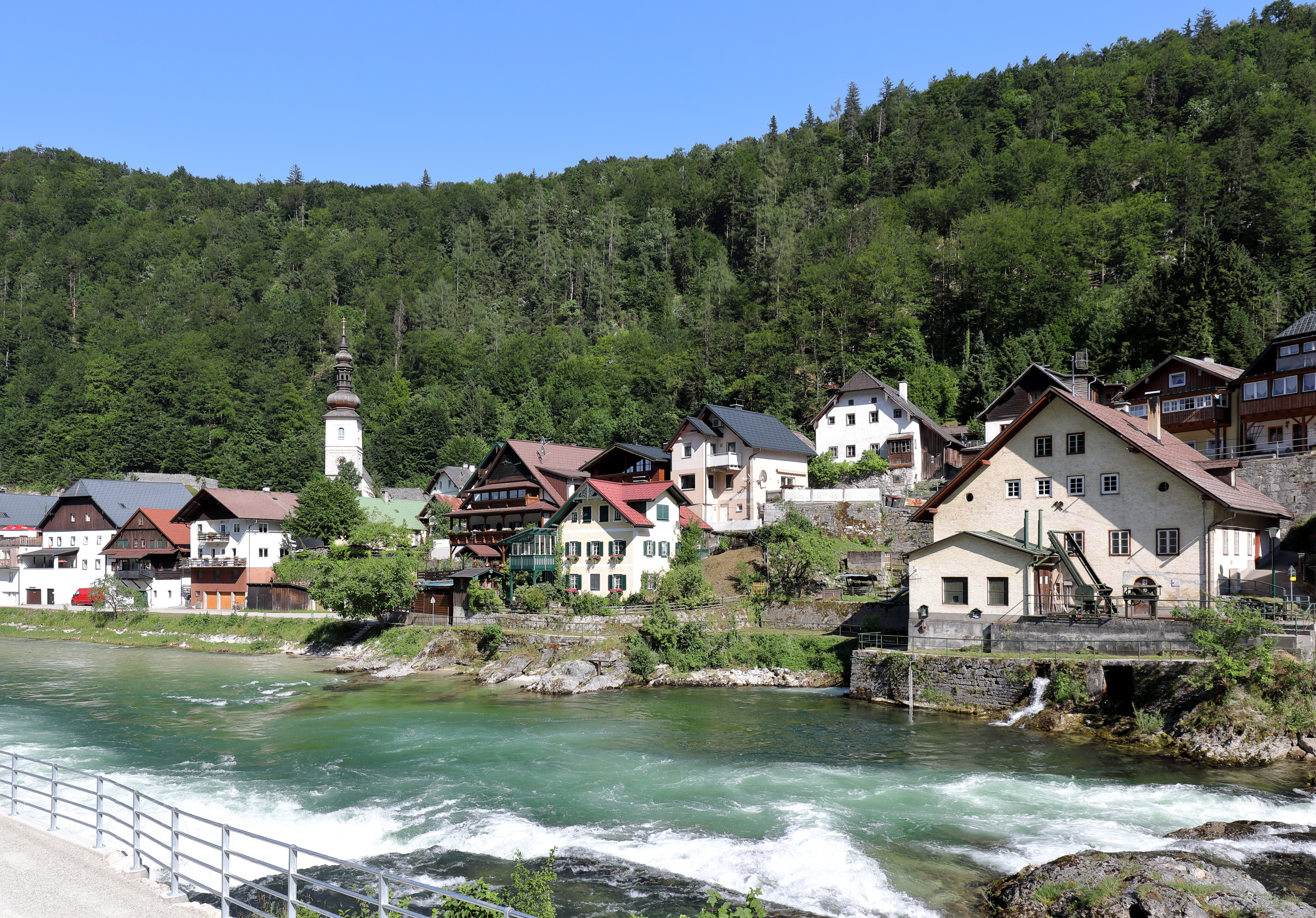
Lauffen

Lauffen is in the district Gmunden within the central Salzkammergut in southern Upper Austria. It's a Katastralgemeinde of Bad Ischl. Its elevation is 490 m.
