= Upper Austrian Prealps =

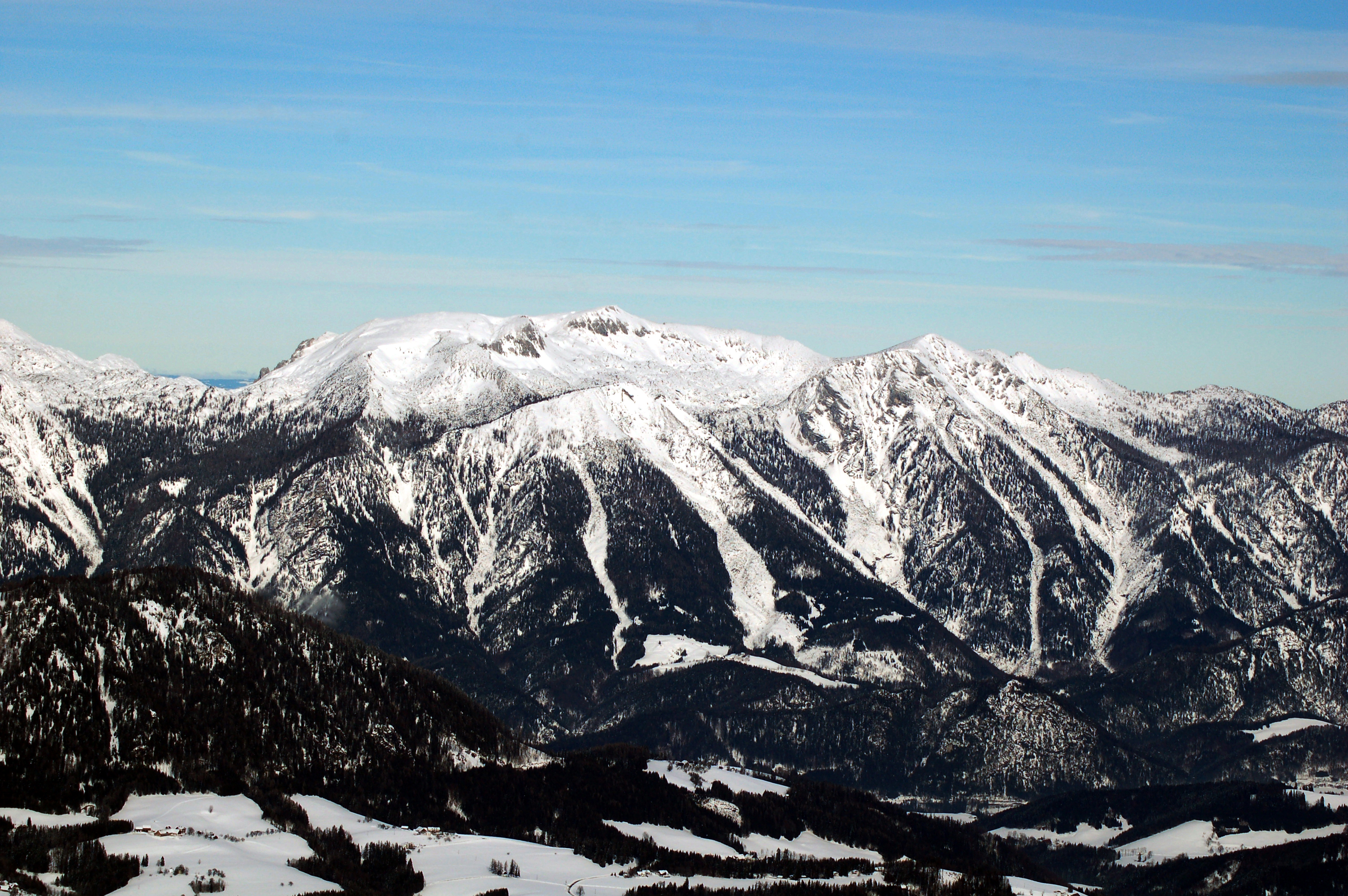
- Southwest side. High Nock (1963 m) in the middle, in front of it Hagler (1669 m) and on the right Gamsplan (1902 m).

Highest point
- Peak: Hoher Nock
- Elevation: 1,963 m (6,440 ft)

Geography
- Country: Austria
- State: Upper Austria
- Range coordinates: 47°51′59.5″N 14°21′7.6″E
- Parent range: Northern Limestone Alps

Climbing
- Normal route: AVE 17b (classification)

The Upper Austrian Prealps (German: Oberösterreichische Voralpen) is a mountain range in Austria which, according to the Categorisation of the Eastern Alps, covers the region between the valley of the Traun (Gmunden) in the west and the Enns valley in the east, from Steyr in the north. It is usually counted as part of the Enns- and Steyrtal Prealps and Salzkammergut Prealps (separated somewhat by the Steyr valley). Politically it covers the districts of Steyr-Land and Kirchdorf. Large parts are located within the Limestone Alps National Park.

It includes the following mountain groups:

- Sengsengebirge
- Reichraminger Hintergebirge

Other well-known peaks are the:

- Kremsmauer
- Kasberg
- Traunstein

The Totes Gebirge range in the south is no longer counted as part of the Prealps, but the Upper Austrian Limestone High Alps. The AVE classifies it as its own group.
