= Traunstein (mountain) =

Mountain in Gmunden, Austria

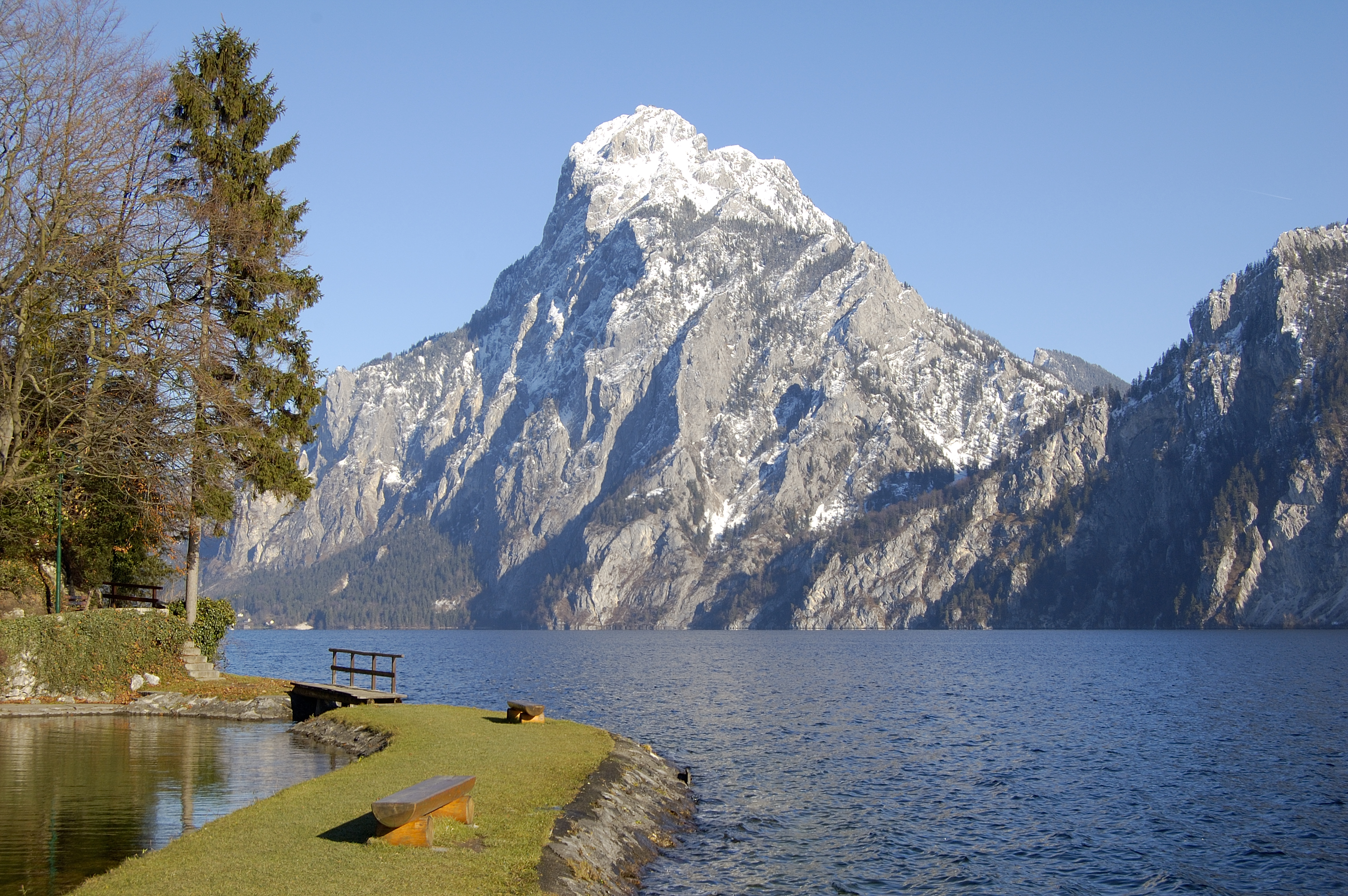
- Traunstein from Traunkirchen

Highest point
- Elevation: 1,691 m (5,548 ft)
- Prominence: 694 m (2,277 ft)
- Coordinates: 47°52′25″N 13°50′26″E

Geography
- Location within Austria
- Location: Upper Austria, Austria
- Parent range: Upper Austrian Prealps

Traunstein (German: [ˈtʁaʊ̯nˌʃ͡taɪ̯n]) is the highest mountain on the east bank of Traunsee in the district of Gmunden, Austria. As measured by the height above sea level of its summit it is 1,691 metres (5,548 ft) high. Because of its almost vertical walls ending directly in the lake and secluded, advanced position Traunstein looks like a boulder in the landscape. Its distinctive silhouette is visible from a great distance therefore it is often called a guardian of the Salzkammergut.

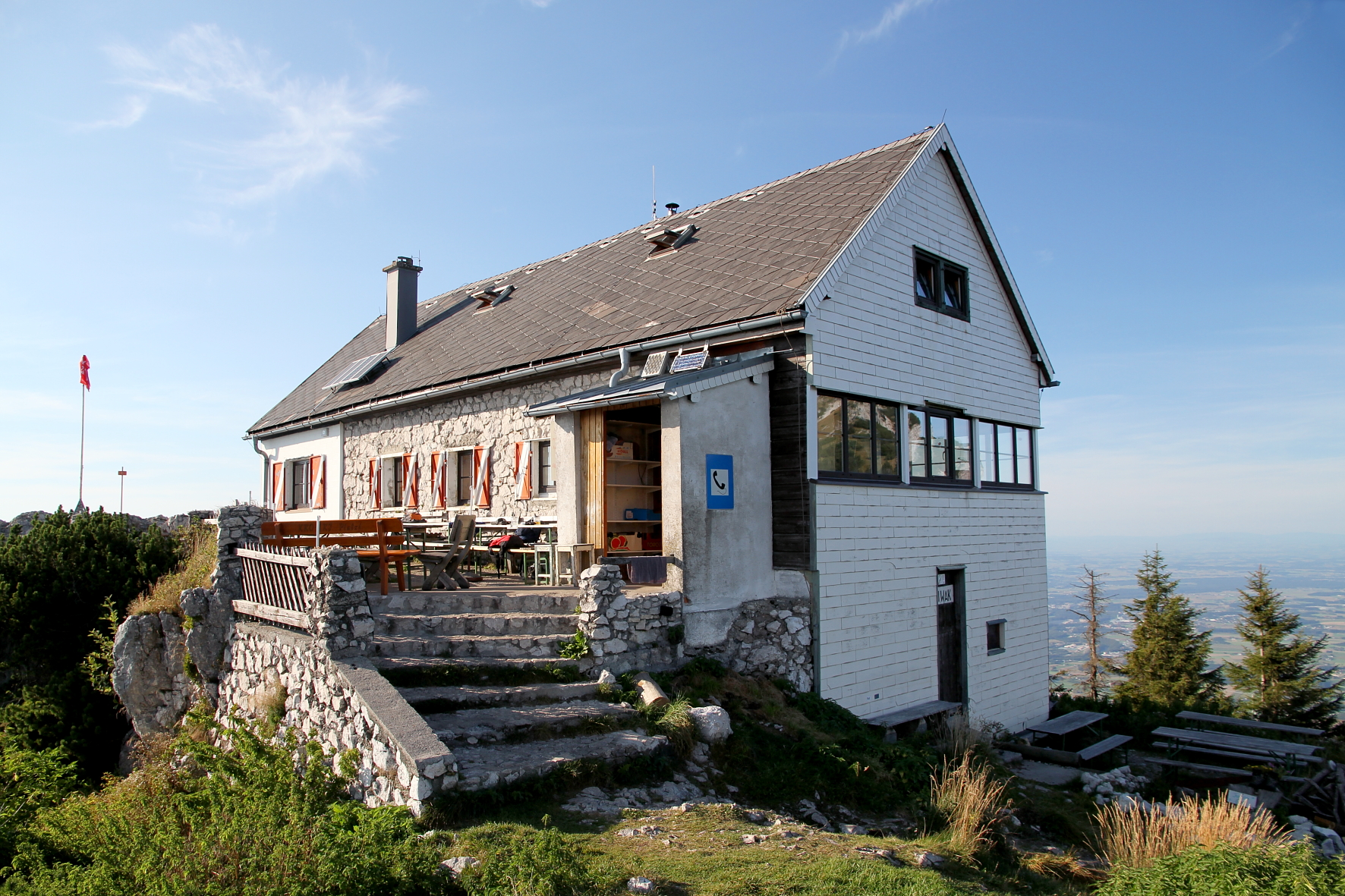
Traunsteinhütte (Naturfreundehütte)

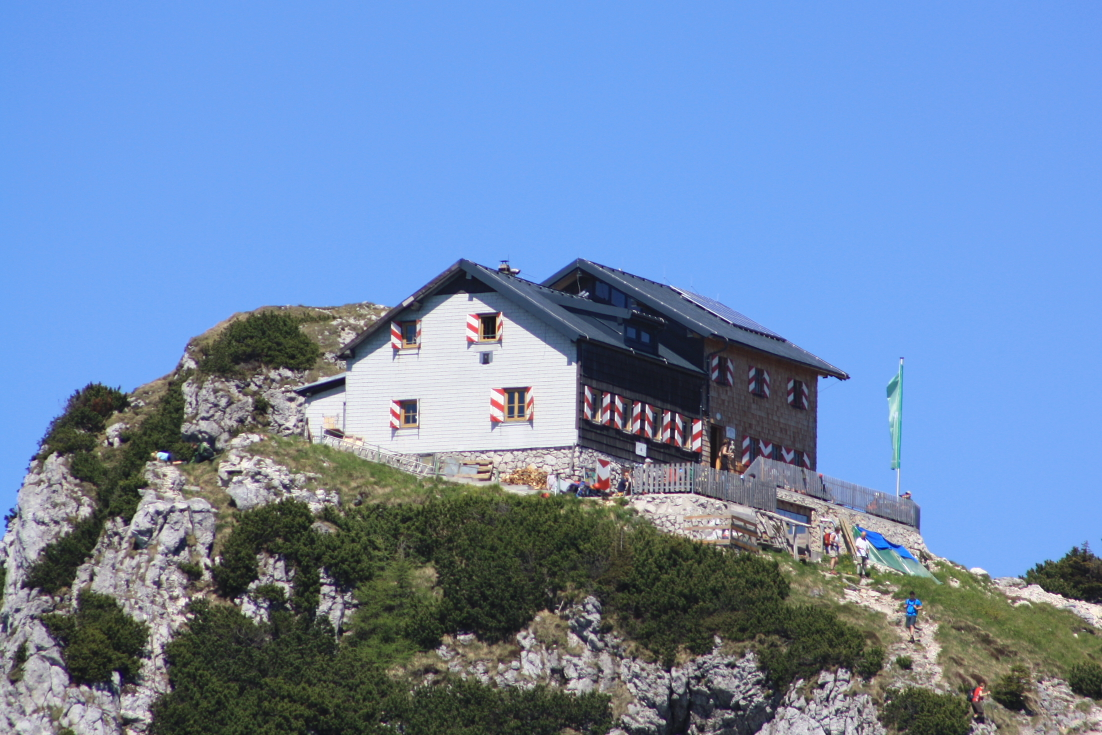
Gmundnerhütte

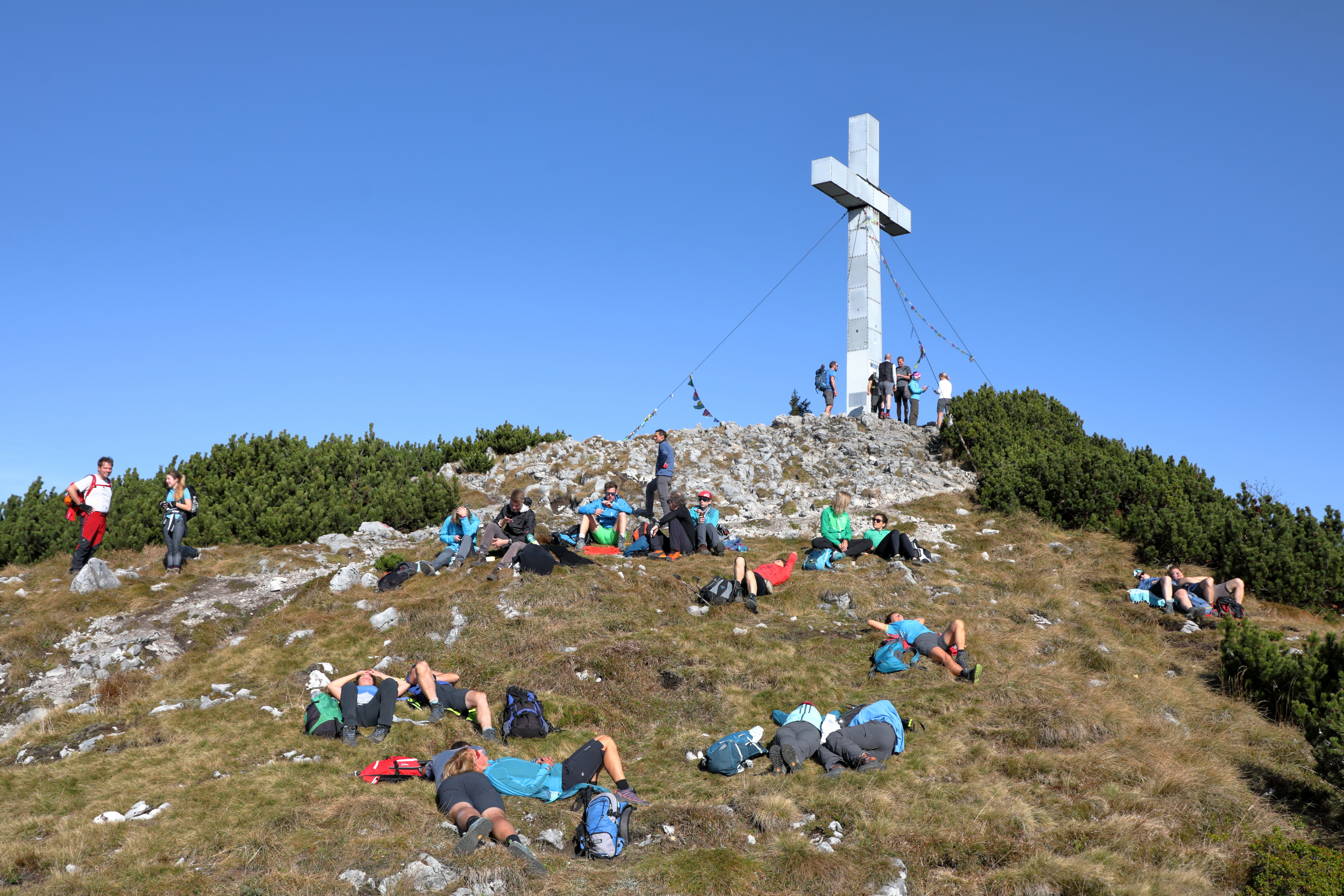
Summit cross

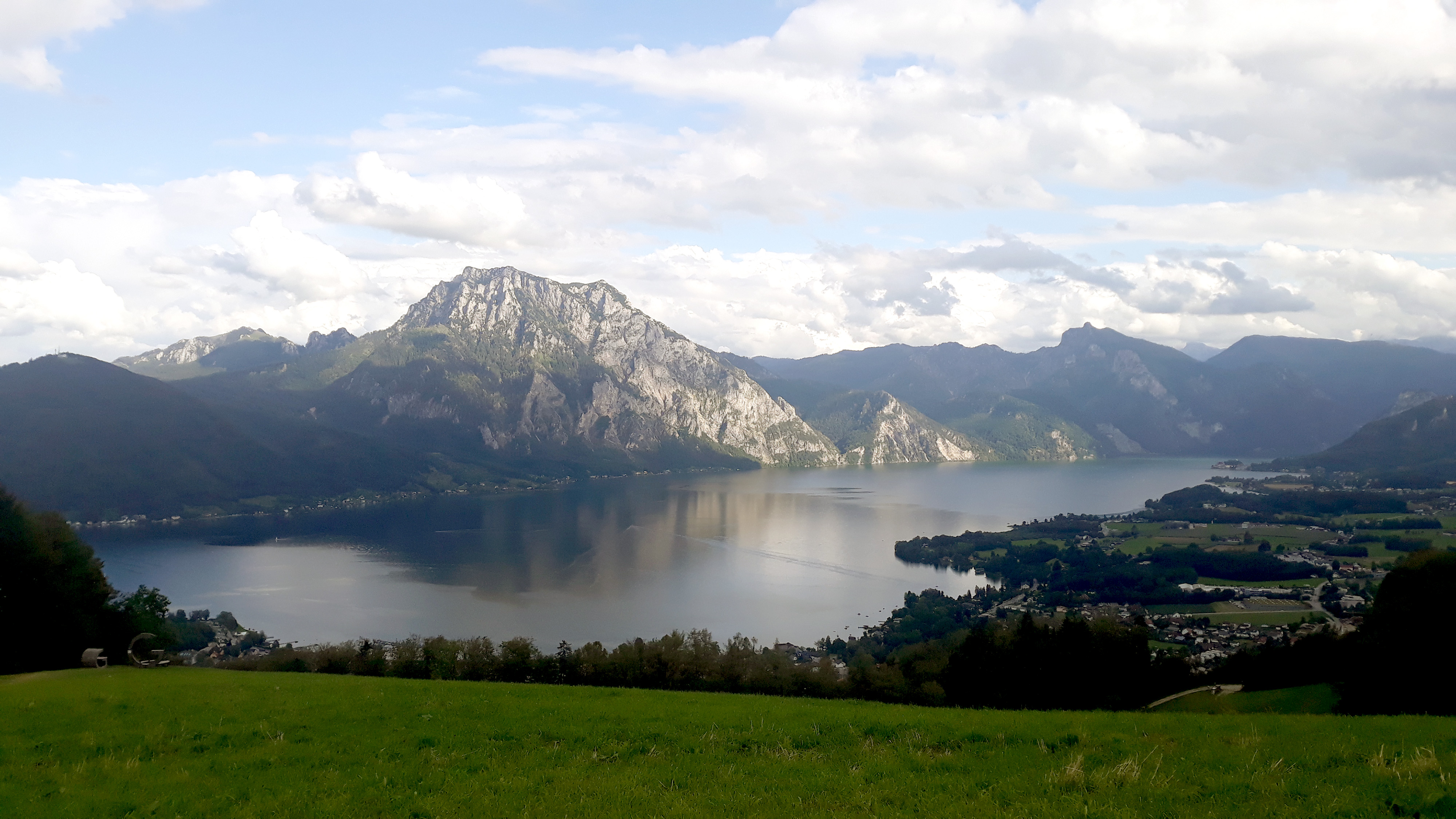
Traunsee from Gmundnerberg
