= Steyrermühl =

Village in Austria

Coordinates: 47°59′N 13°48′E

Steyrermühl is a village (Ortsteil), part of Laakirchen in Gmunden District, Upper Austria, Austria.
