= Bad Ischl =

- Municipality
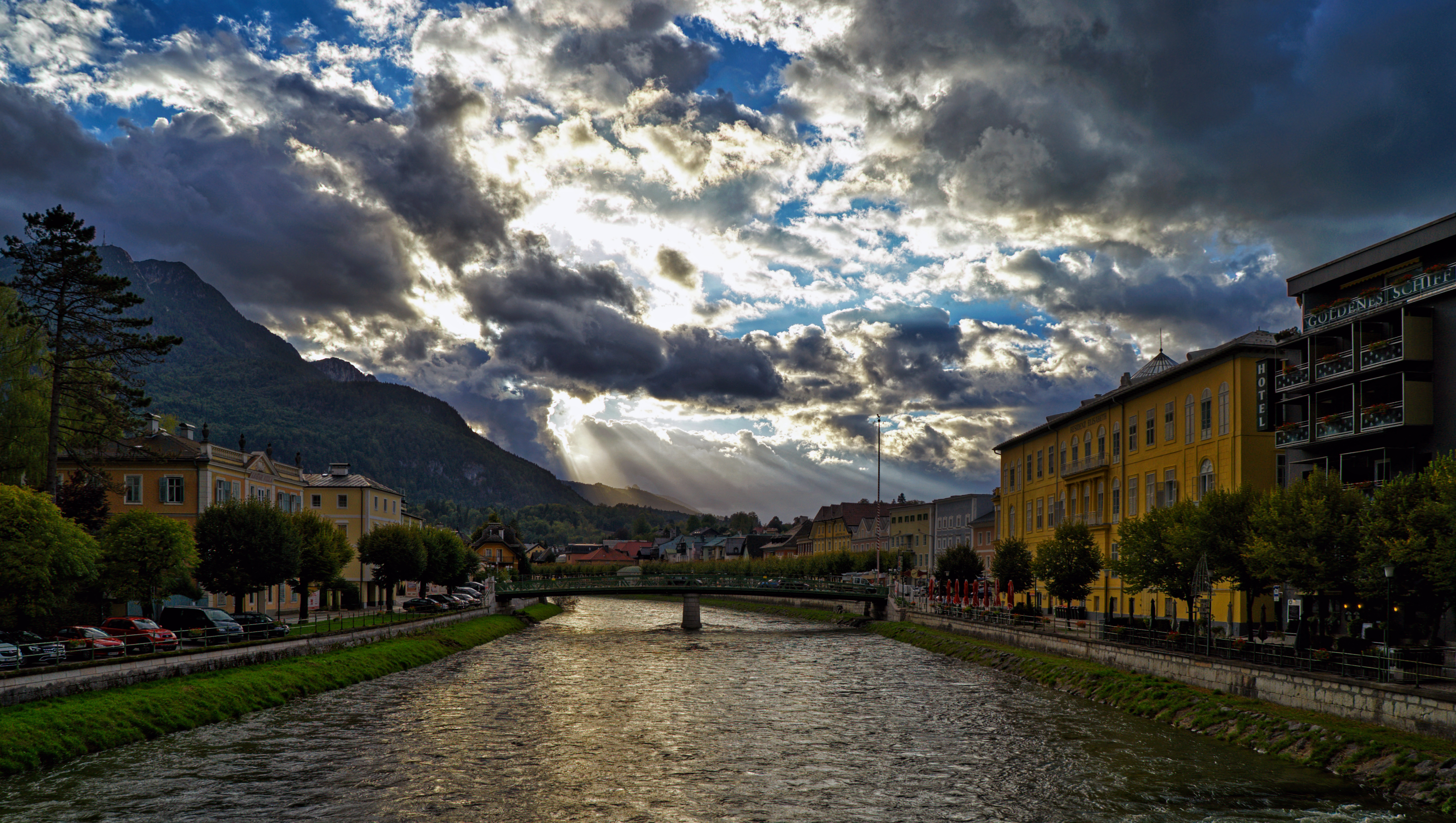

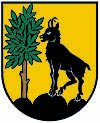
- Coat of arms

- Location within Austria
- Coordinates: 47°43′13″N 13°38′0″E
- Country: Austria
- State: Upper Austria
- District: Gmunden

Government
  - Mayor: Ines Schiller (SPÖ)

Area
  - Total: 162.8 km^{2} (62.9 sq mi)
- Elevation: 468 m (1,535 ft)

Population (2018-01-01)
  - Total: 14,133
  - Density: 86.81/km^{2} (224.8/sq mi)
- Time zone: UTC+1 (CET)
  - Summer (DST): UTC+2 (CEST)
- Postal code: 4820
- Area code: 06132
- Vehicle registration: GM
- Website: www.bad-ischl.ooe.gv.at

Bad Ischl (Austrian German [baːt ˈɪʃl̩]) is a spa town in Austria. It lies in the southern part of Upper Austria, at the river Traun in the centre of the Salzkammergut region. The town consists of the Katastralgemeinden Ahorn, Bad Ischl, Haiden, Jainzen, Kaltenbach, Lauffen, Lindau, Pfandl, Perneck, Reiterndorf and Rettenbach. It is connected to the village of Strobl by the river Ischl, which drains from the Wolfgangsee, and to the Traunsee, into which the stream empties. It is home to the Kaiservilla, summer residence of Austro-Hungarian monarchs Emperor Franz Joseph I and Empress Elisabeth. In 2024, Bad Ischl was one of the European Capitals of Culture – the third city in Austria after Graz (2003) and Linz (2009).

== History ==
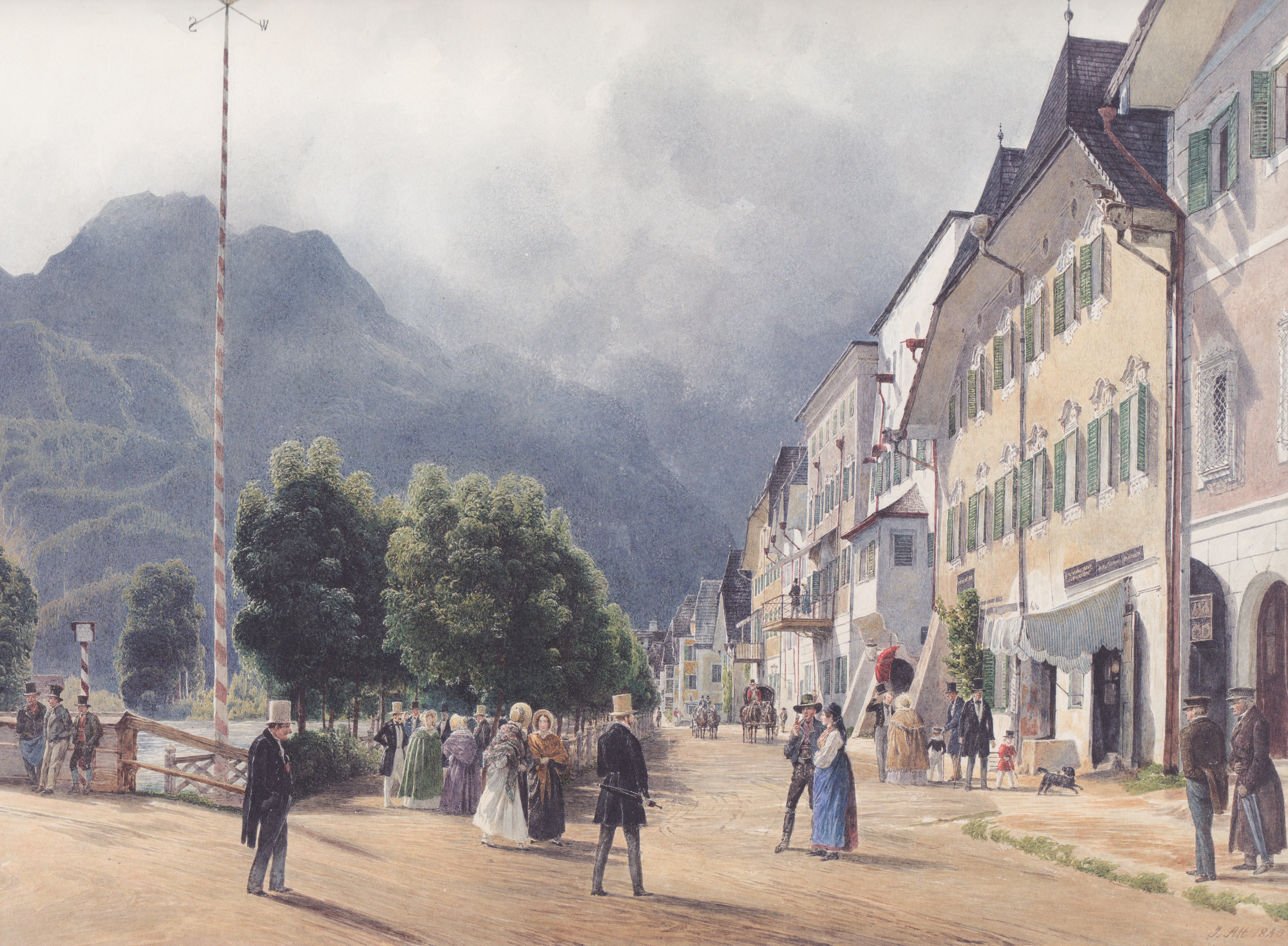
The Esplanade in Bad Ischl painted by Rudolf von Alt, 1840

Humans have lived in the Bad Ischl area since the time of the pre-historic Hallstatt culture; documentary evidence of the settlement dates from a 1262 deed, in which it appears as Iselen. In 1419 Archduke Albert V of Austria established the local seat of the Salt Chamber (Salzkammer) at Wildenstein Castle, and Ischl was granted the privileges of a market town in 1466 by Emperor Frederick III. A first salt mine was opened in 1563, a salt evaporation pond (German: Saline) followed in 1571.

When in the early part of the 19th century brine became medically popular in Continental Europe, Ischl soon turned into a fashionable spa resort – notable guests included Prince Klemens Wenzel von Metternich (1773–1859), Archduke Rudolf of Austria (1788–1831) and Archduke Franz Karl of Austria (1802–1878). The Hotel Post, opened in 1828, was the first one in the whole Salzkammergut area. In 1849 Franz Karl's son, Emperor Franz Joseph I of Austria chose the town for his summer residence.

On 19 August 1853 the engagement between Franz Joseph and Elisabeth of Bavaria (Sisi) took place at the Seeauerhaus, Esplanade No. 10, which since 1989 has been the location of the Museum der Stadt Bad Ischl.

In 1854, the Emperor's mother, Archduchess Sophie, gave him the Kaiservilla (Imperial Villa) as a wedding present. The villa became the imperial family's summer residence; Franz Joseph described it as "Heaven on Earth". The Emperor granted to his mistress Katharina Schratt a nearby mansion, easily reached via a hidden footpath. In the Kaiservilla on 28 July 1914 Franz Joseph signed Austria-Hungary's declaration of war against the Kingdom of Serbia, signalling the start of hostilities in World War I. He left Bad Ischl on the following day and never returned. The Habsburg-Lorraine family still own the villa, although the grounds and parts of the residence are now open to the public.

In the aftermath of the 1945 defeat of Nazi Germany in World War II, Bad Ischl became the location of a displaced persons (DP) camp for survivors of the Holocaust and of Nazi concentration camps in Eastern Europe. The resident displaced persons were primarily Jews from Poland and other neighboring countries. They received lodging, food, medical care and administrative assistance until able to make other, more permanent arrangements. Many left for the United States, Israel or Canada. The Bad Ischl DP camp remained active from 1945 until 1952.

== Population ==
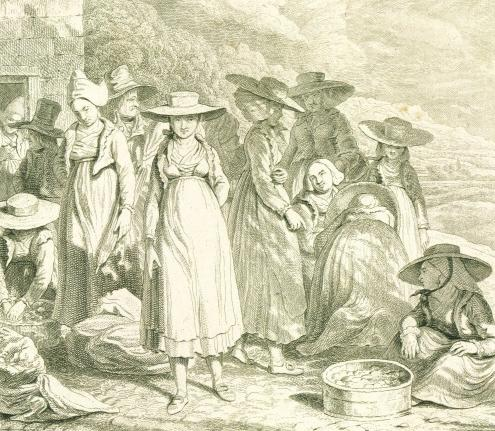
English copper engraving Ischl, Sunday Cloathes, buying fruit, dated 1822

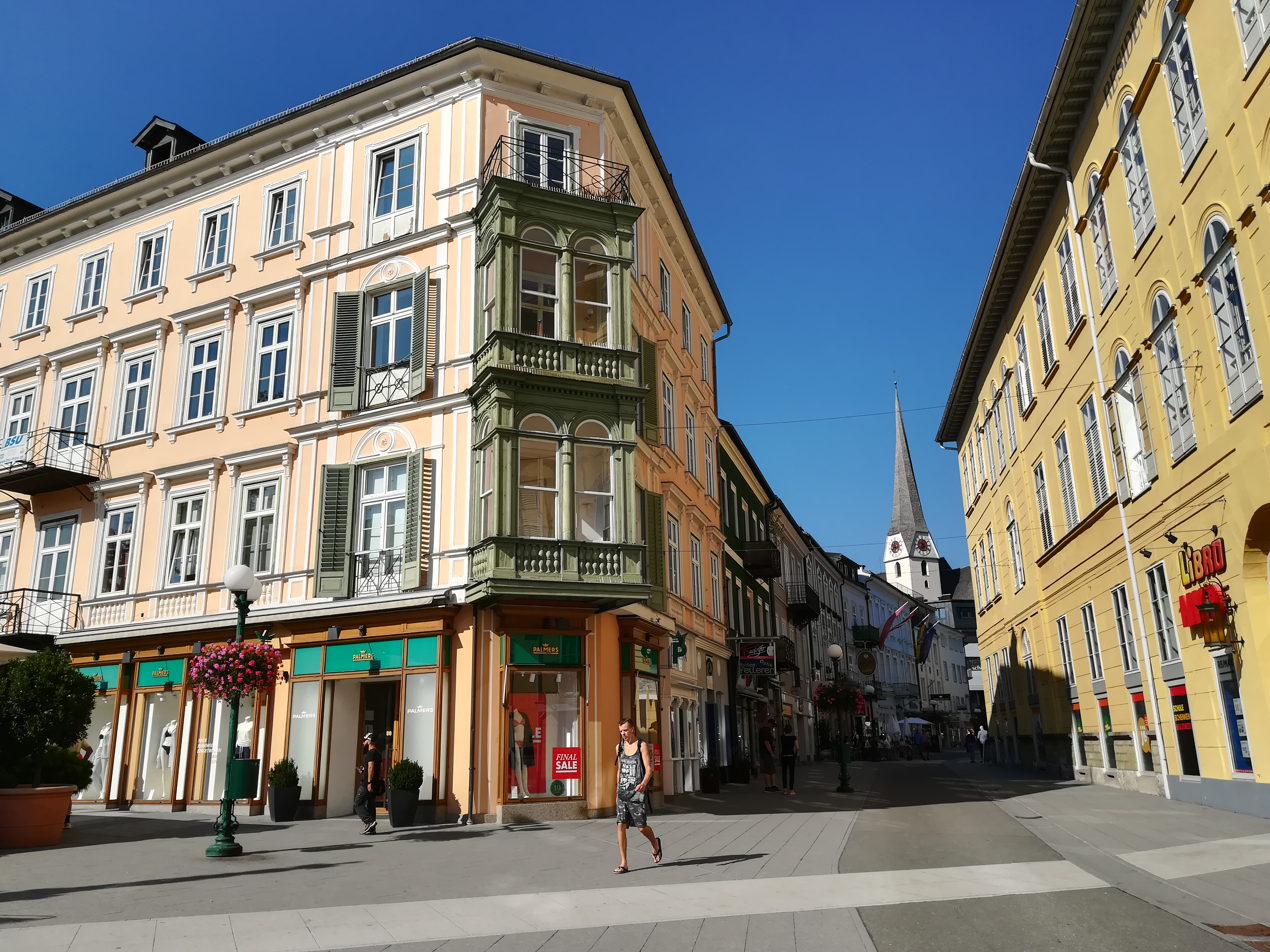
Bad Ischl, church in the street

Historical population
Year	Pop.	±%
1869	6,827	—
1880	7,678	+12.5%
1890	8,473	+10.4%
1900	9,655	+14.0%
1910	10,188	+5.5%
1923	10,224	+0.4%
1934	10,354	+1.3%
1939	10,396	+0.4%
1951	13,422	+29.1%
1961	12,703	−5.4%
1971	12,812	+0.9%
1981	12,970	+1.2%
1991	13,887	+7.1%
2001	14,081	+1.4%
2011	13,939	−1.0%
2015	13,813	−0.9%

Approximately 15% of the city's population was foreign born in 2019.

== Sights ==
Besides the Kaiservilla, the city offers several health spas and tourist attractions, like the historic Kongresshaus opened in 1875, the new Kurhaus built by Clemens Holzmeister in 1932, as well as the Lehár Villa, the former residence of Franz Lehár, that he acquired in 1912 and today serves as a museum. The Saint Nicholas parish church was first mentioned in a 1344 deed.

Bad Ischl is also known for the Konditorei Zauner pastry shop, former k.u.k. purveyor established in 1832, and the small Lehártheater built in 1827.

A gondola lift runs from the town up to the Katrin alpine pasture at 1415 m (4643 ft), which offers a panoramic view of the Salzkammergut mountains. The ruins of Wildenstein Castle, which burnt down in 1715, are nearby.

The Bad Ischl Cemetery is listed by the State of Upper Austria as a protected historical site. Amongst those buried there are the composers Franz Lehár, Rudi Gfaller, and Oscar Straus.

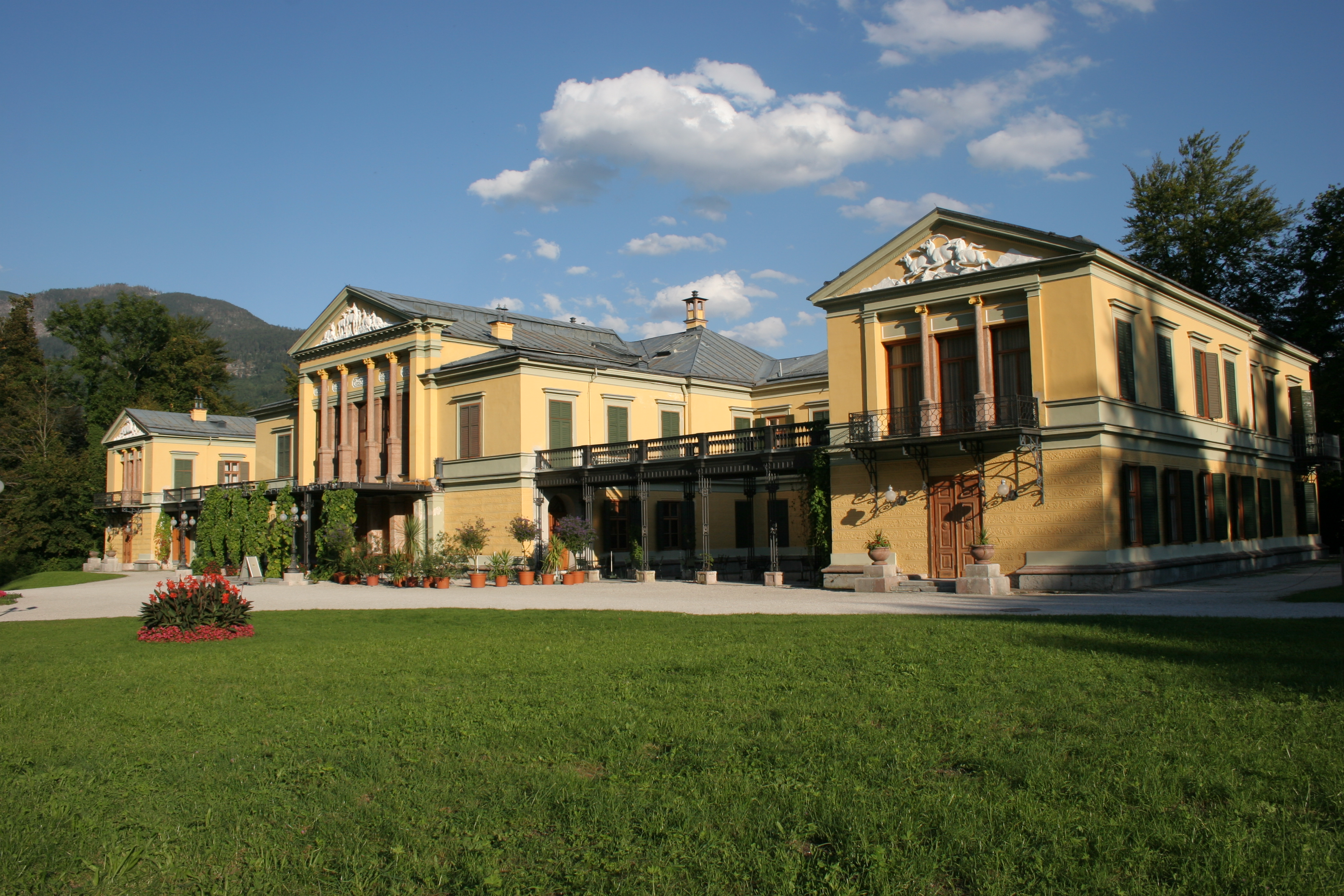
Kaiservilla

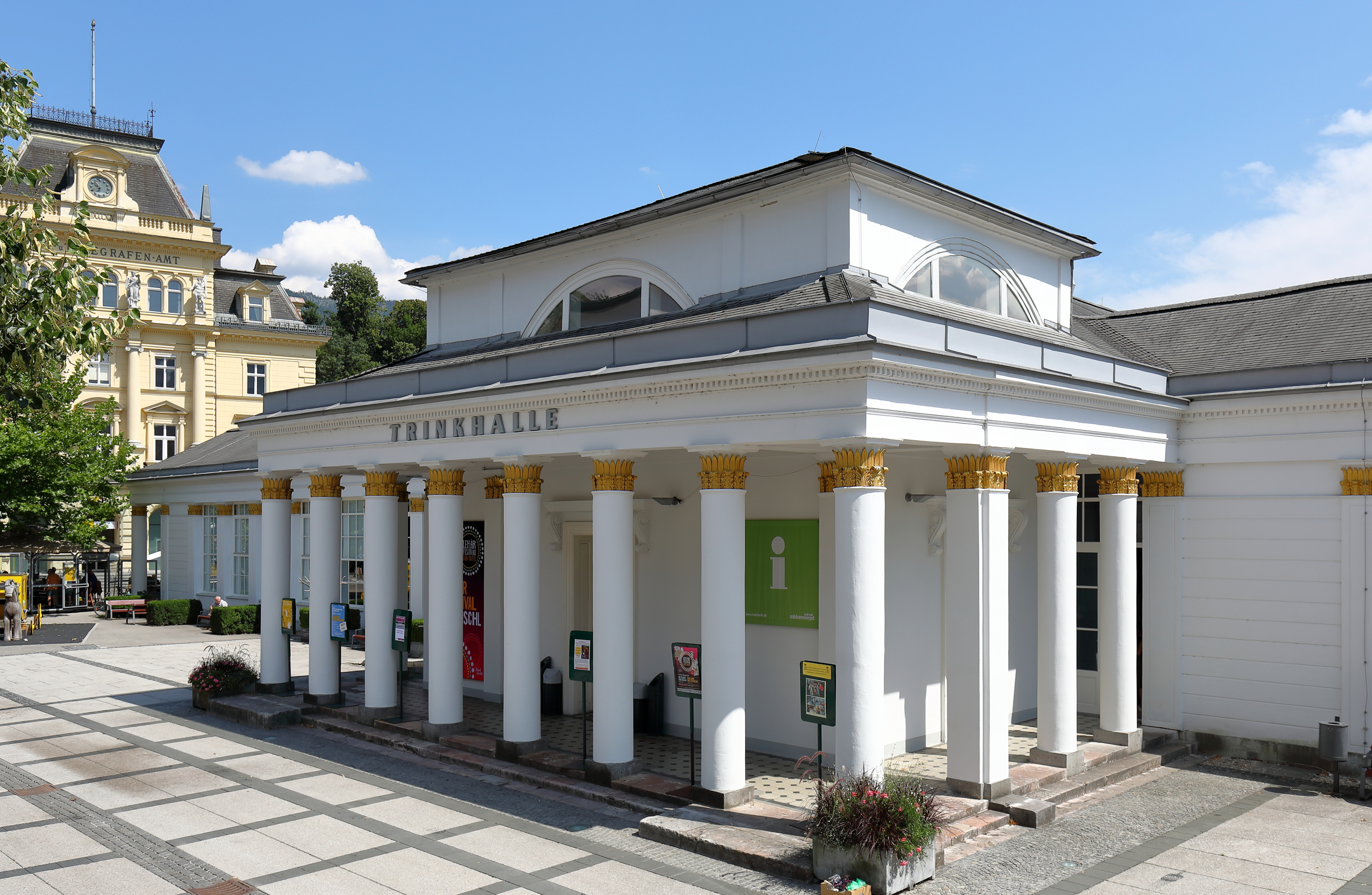
Trinkhalle

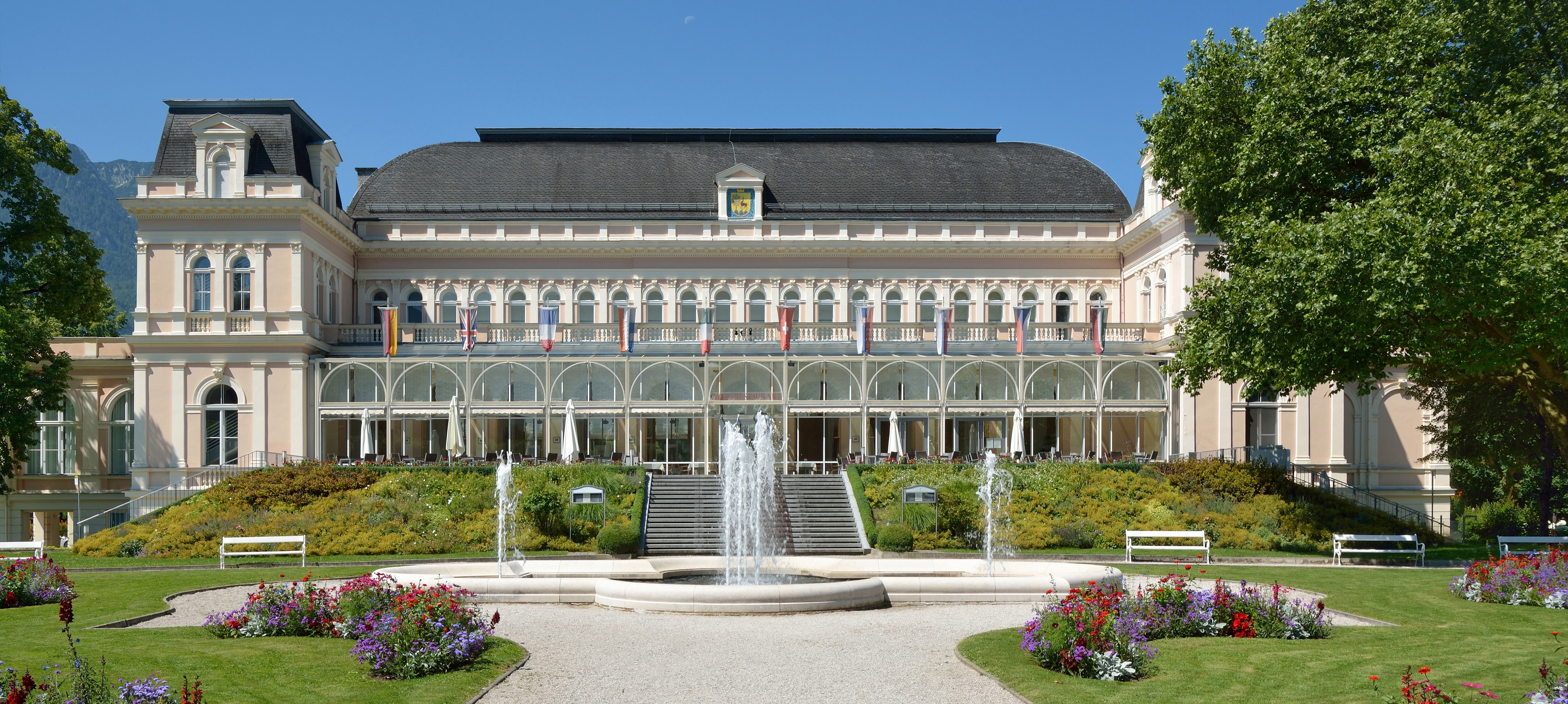
Kongress- und Theaterhaus

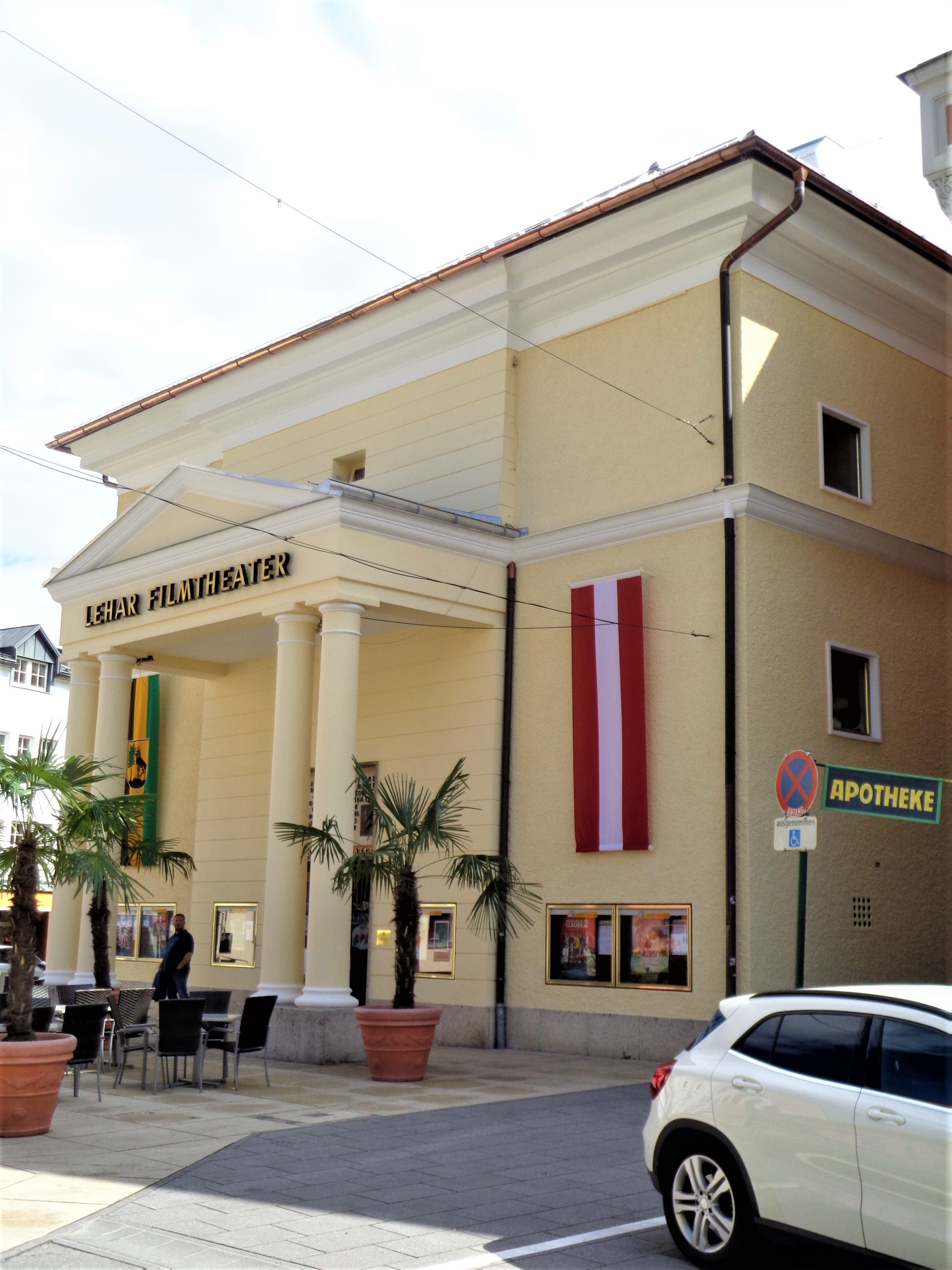
Lehar-Filmtheater

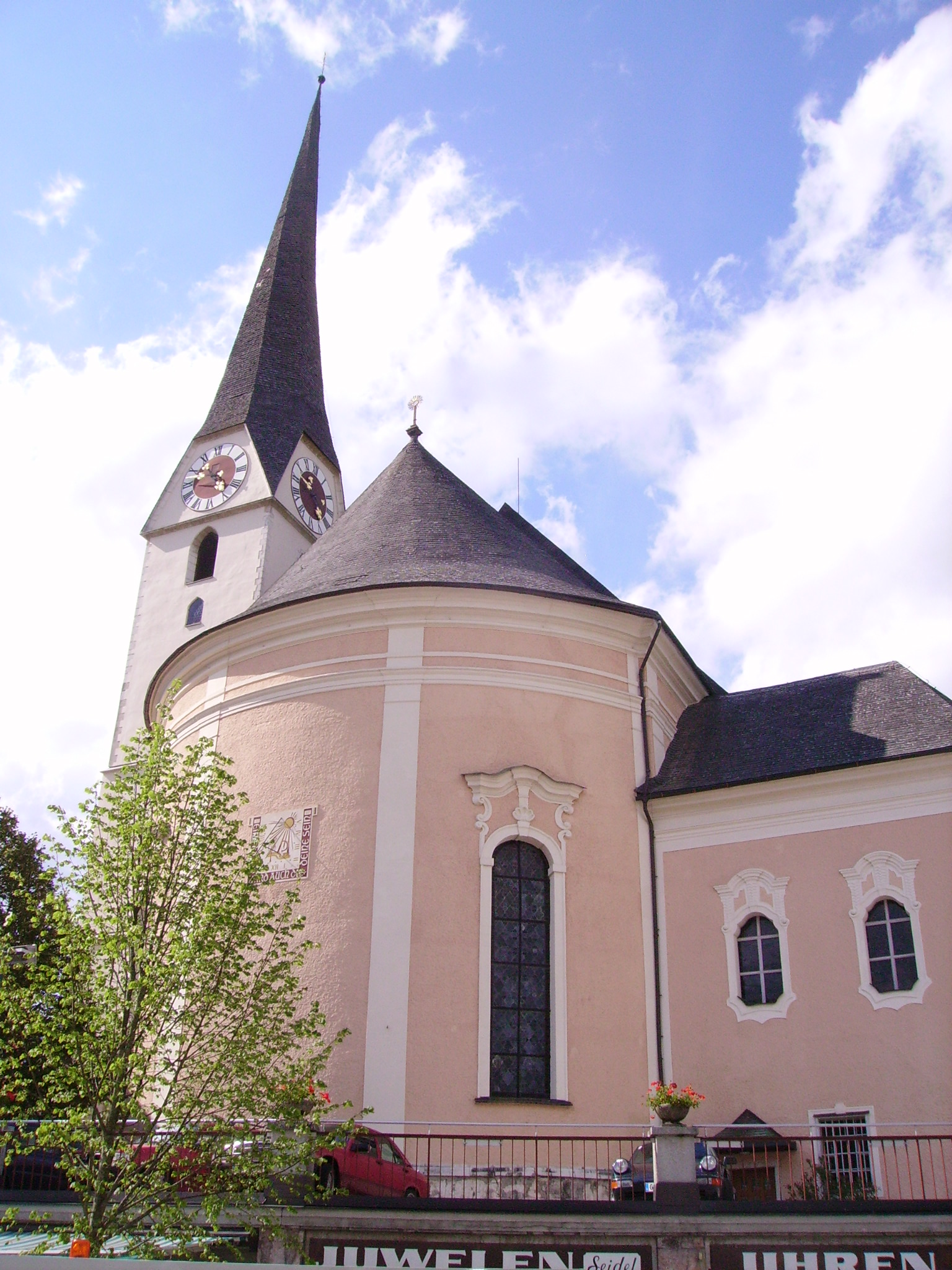
St. Nicholas' Church

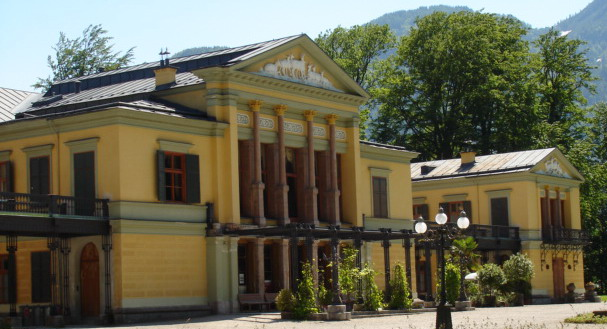
Kaiservilla

== Notable people ==
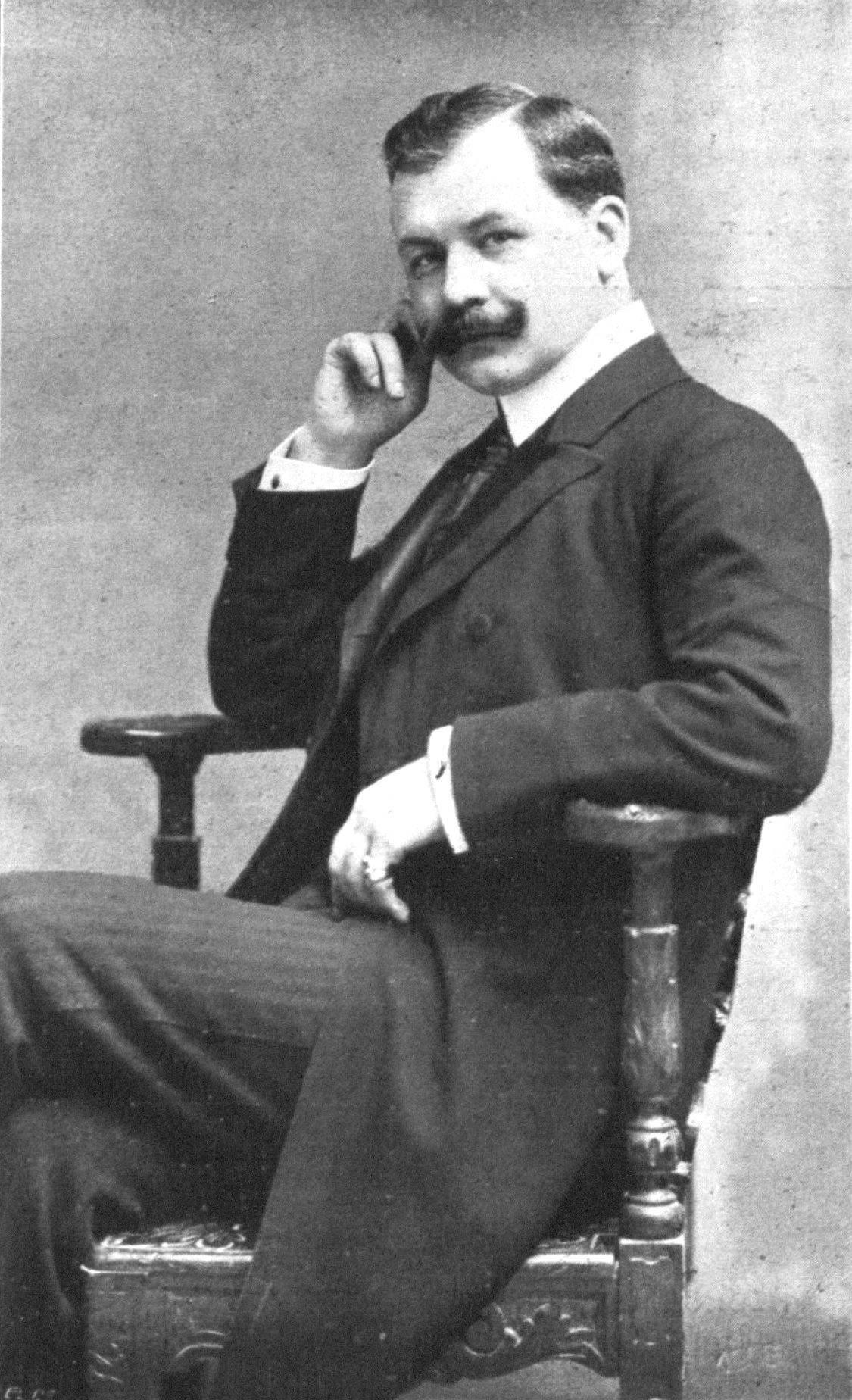
Franz Lehár, 1906

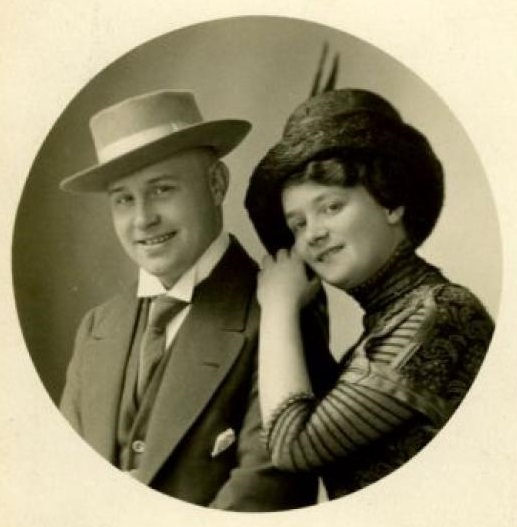
Rudi Gfaller and Therese Wiet, 1914

- Leopold Hasner von Artha (1818 – 1891 in Bad Ischl), politician, the 4th Minister-President of Cisleithania
- Johannes Brahms (1833 – 1897), German composer
- Franz Lehár (1870 – 1948 in Bad Ischl), operetta composer, he wrote The Merry Widow
- Oscar Straus (1870 – 1954 in Bad Ischl), composer of operettas and film scores
- Wilhelm von Mirbach (1871 in Bad Ischl – 1918), German diplomat, assassinated in Moscow.
- Leo Perutz (1882 – 1957 in Bad Ischl), an Austrian novelist and mathematician.
- Rudi Gfaller (1882 – 1972 in Bad Ischl), an operetta composer and singer
- Viktor Schauberger (1885 – 1958), forester, naturalist, philosopher, inventor and pseudoscientist
- Therese Wiet (1885 – 1971 in Bad Ischl), an Austrian operetta and concert singer
- Karl Eglseer (1890 in Bad Ischl – 1944), a general in the Wehrmacht in WWII
- Wolfram von Richthofen (1895 – 1945), German field marshal, died in captivity at Bad Ischl
- Resi Pesendorfer (1902 in Bad Ischl – 1989), a resistance activist opposing Austrofascism
- Leopold Engleitner (1905 – 2013), conscientious objector, grew up in Bad Ischl.
- Jacques de Menasce (1905 in Bad Ischl – 1960), a composer, pianist and critic
- Josef Plieseis (1913 – 1966), communist Widerstand fighter
- Sir Henry Rowe KCB, QC (1916 – 1992), British lawyer and parliamentary draftsman.
- Sir Gustav Nossal CBE FRS (born 1931), research biologist into antibody formation and immunological tolerance.
- Franz Josef Altenburg (1941 – 2021), aristocrat, ceramicist and sculptor
- Helmut Berger (born 1944 in Bad Ischl), actor of narcissistic and ambiguous characters.
- Jörg Haider (1950 – 2008), politician (FPÖ), attended school in Bad Ischl.
- Roger Lewis (born 1960), a Welsh academic, biographer and journalist; lives in Bad Ischl.

=== Sport ===
- Udo Plamberger (born 1971 in Bad Ischl), a former professional tennis player
- Wolfgang Loitzl (born 1980), an Austrian former ski jumper and team gold medallist at the 2010 Winter Olympics
- Sarah Zadrazil (born 1993), an Austrian footballer who has played 111 games for Austria women
- Carina Edlinger (born 1998), visually-impaired Paralympic cross-country skier and medallist

== Twin towns ==
- Gödöllő, Hungary
- Opatija, Croatia
- Sarajevo, (Bosnia and Herzegovina) Bosnia-Herzegovina

== See also ==
- Lauffen
