= Kaiservilla =

Villa in Bad Ischl, Austria

Coordinates: 47°42′54″N 13°37′15″E

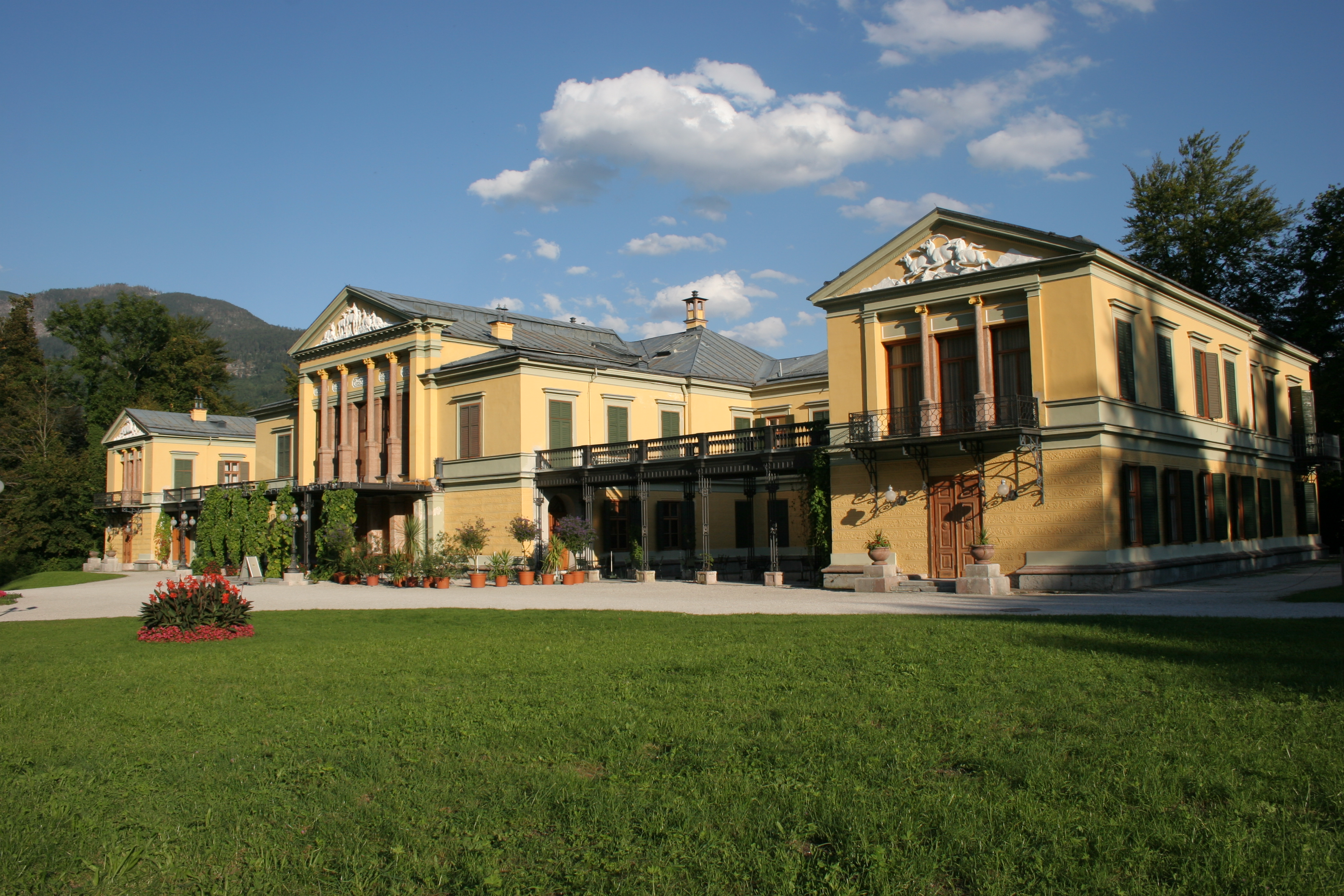
Kaiservilla in Bad Ischl

The Kaiservilla in Bad Ischl, Upper Austria, was the summer residence of Emperor Franz Joseph I and Empress Elisabeth of Austria, known as Sisi. The mansion is currently the residence of their great-grandson Archduke Markus Emanuel Salvator.

== History ==
Originally the palace was a Biedermeier villa belonging to a Viennese notary named Josef August Eltz. In 1850 it was purchased by Eduard Mastalier. After Franz Joseph's engagement to Princess Elisabeth of Bavaria in 1853, Franz Joseph's mother, Princess Sophie of Bavaria, purchased the villa as a wedding present for the couple.

In subsequent years, the villa was altered and expanded in a Neoclassical style by Antonio Legrenzi. The extant central portion was expanded towards the park and the originally posterior portion of the house was converted to form the entrance with Classical columns and tympana. Two additional wings were constructed, giving the building the overall shape of an "E".

The villa is surrounded by a large park in the "English Style". The architectural ensemble in its contemporary form was completed in 1860. Construction was significantly slowed by the fact that it could not proceed during the summer months due to the presence of the royal family.

Today, the mansion is home to the Archduke Markus, but also offers grounds tours to the public.

== Gallery ==
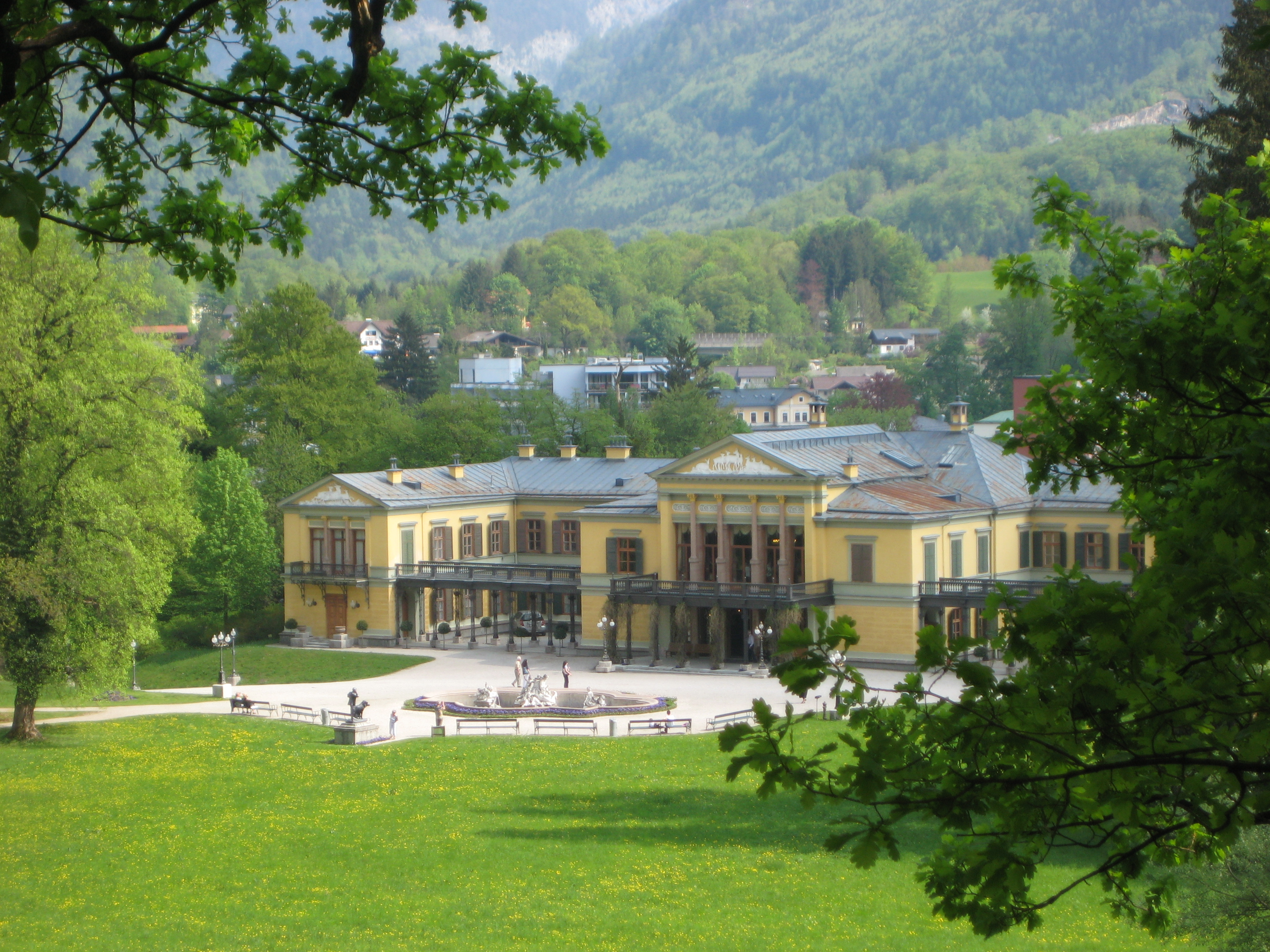
View from Park

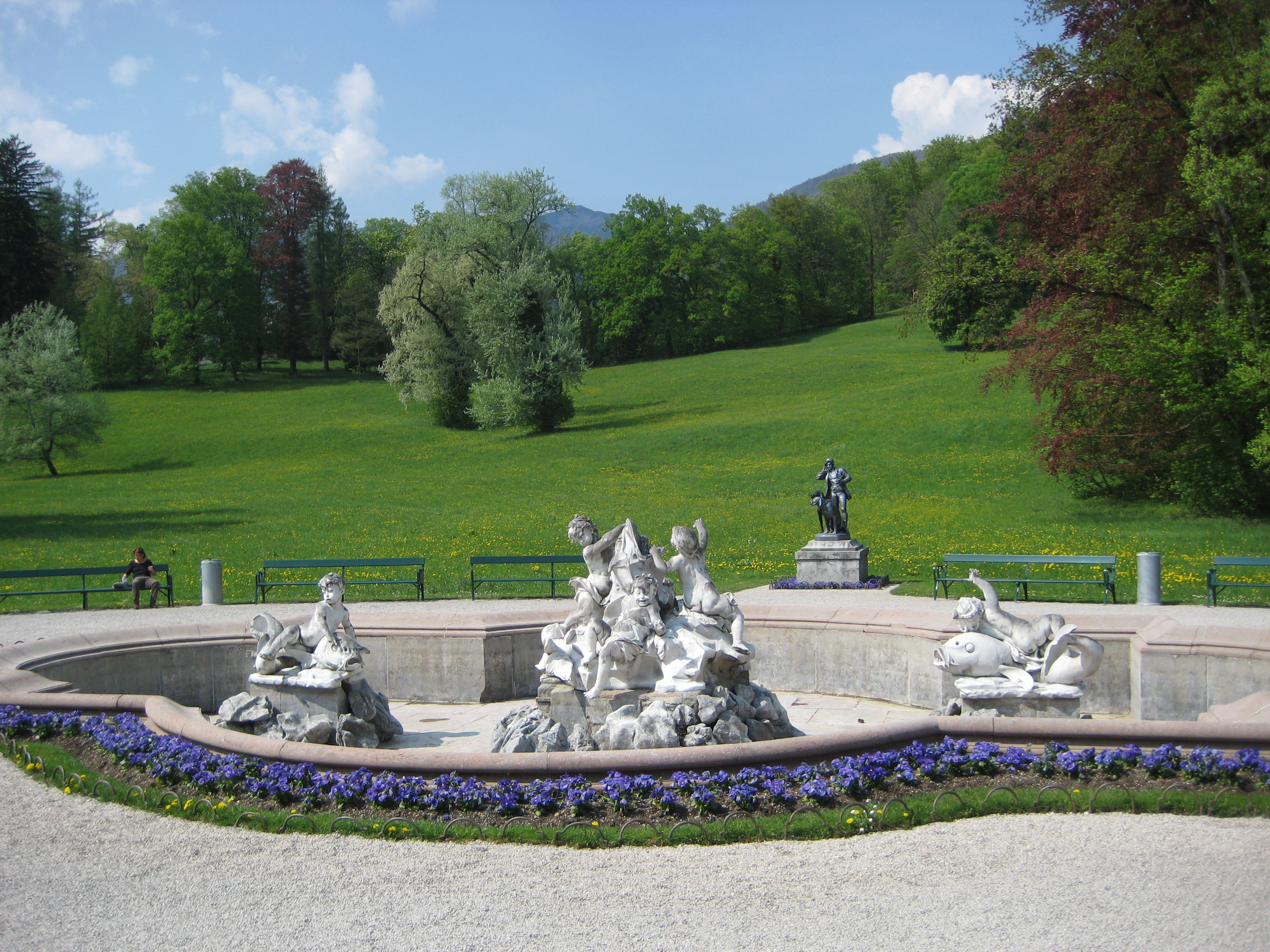
White marble fountain designed by Viktor Tilgner

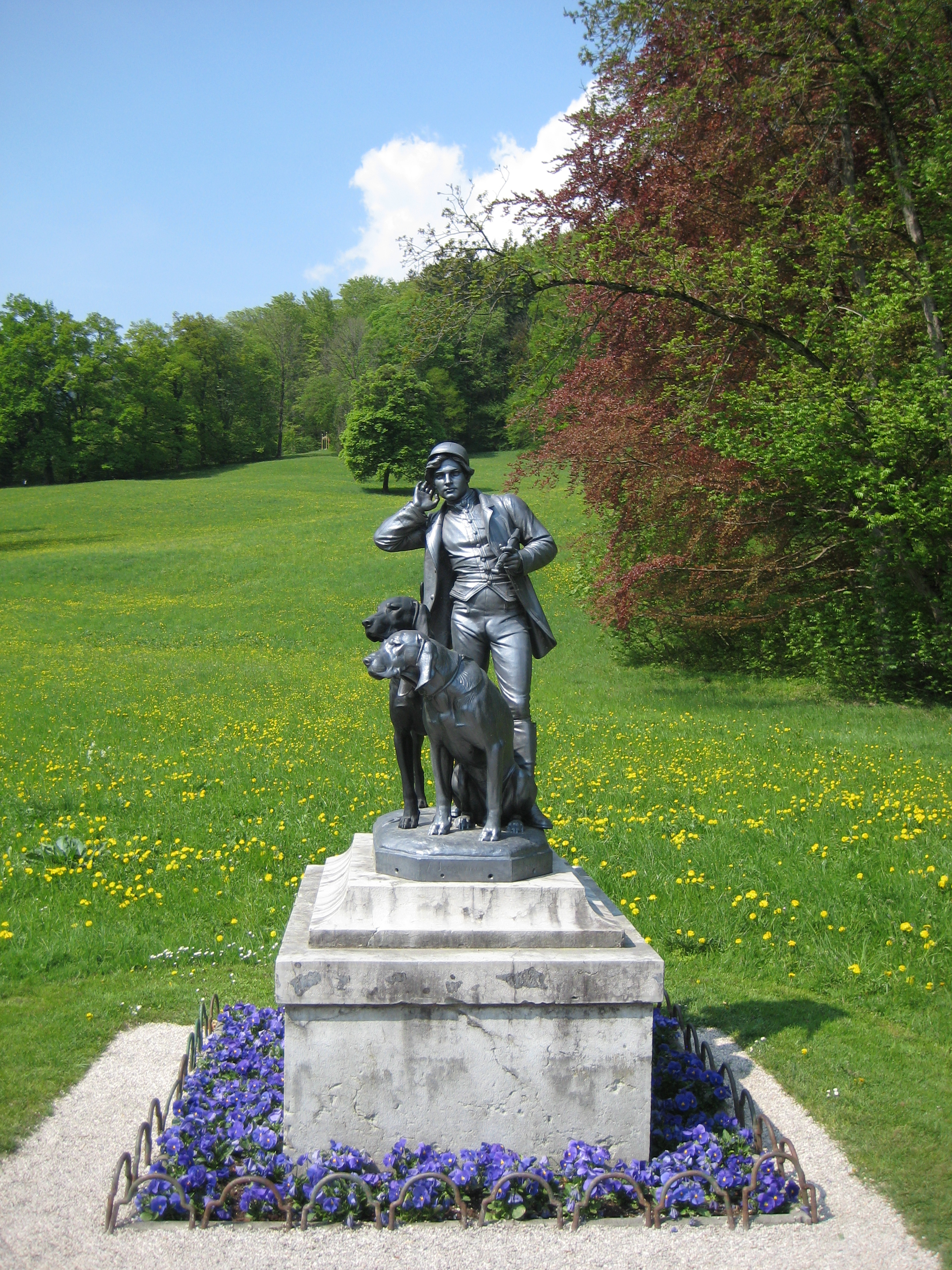
Der Lauscher (The Eavesdropper), a sculpture given to Empress Elizabeth by Queen Victoria
