= Traun (river) =

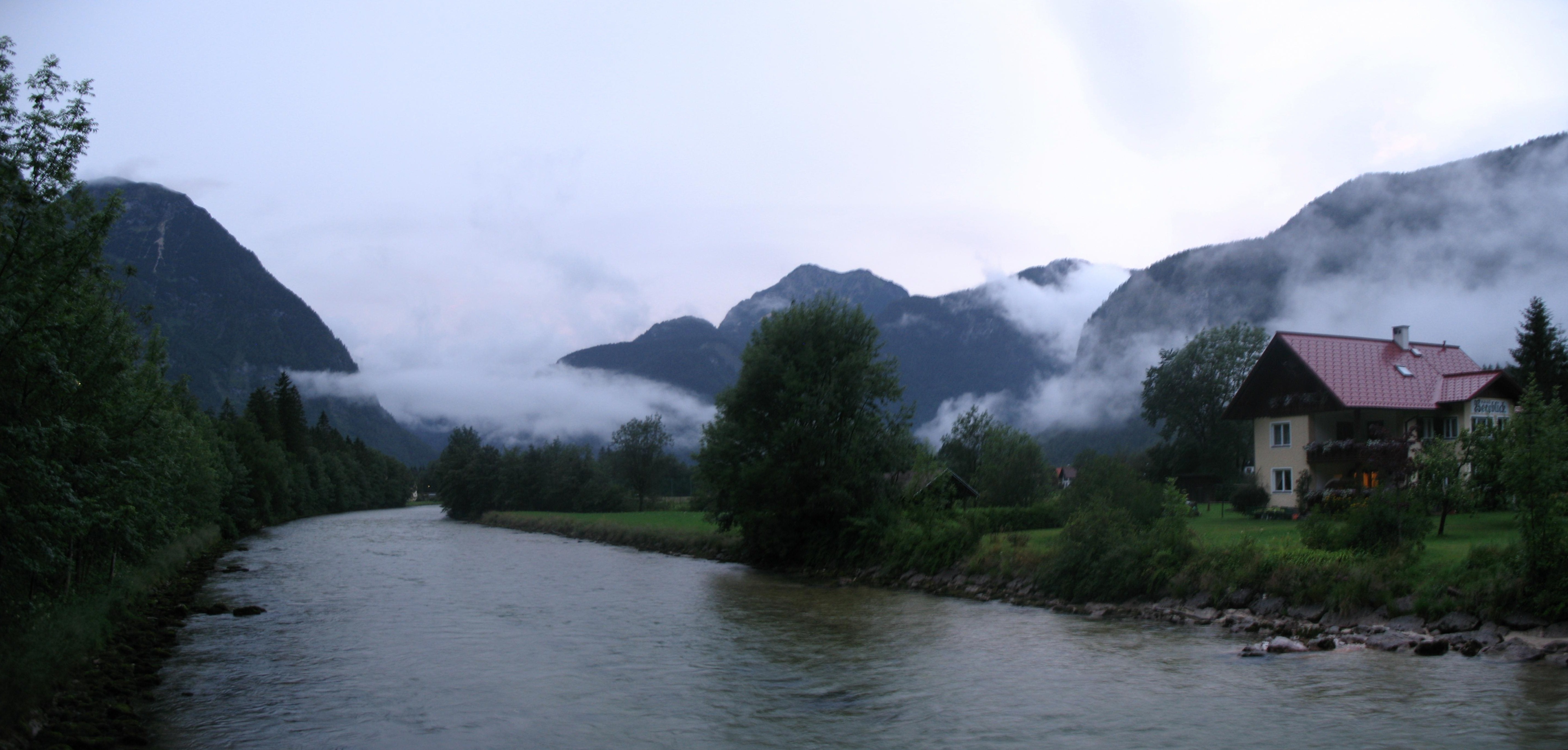
- Traun River near Obertraun

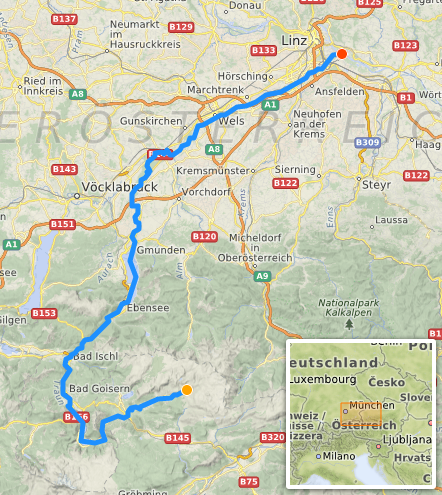
- Map of the watercourse (enlarge)

Location
- Country: Austria
- State: Upper Austria

Physical characteristics
- Source
  - location: Totes Gebirge range
- Mouth
  - location: Danube (Linz)
  - coordinates: 48°16′09″N 14°22′20″E
- Length: 155.9 km (96.9 mi)
- Basin size: 4,257 km^{2} (1,644 sq mi)
- Discharge
  - location: mouth
  - average: 150 m^{3}/s (5,300 cu ft/s)

Basin features
- Progression: Danube→ Black Sea

Traun (German: [ˈtʁaʊn]) is a river in the Austrian state of Upper Austria. Its source is in the Totes Gebirge mountain range in Styria. It flows through the Salzkammergut area and the lakes Hallstätter See and Traunsee. The Traun is a right tributary of the Danube, which it meets near the city of Linz. Other towns along the river are Bad Aussee, Bad Ischl, Gmunden, Wels and Traun. The Traun is 155.9 km (96.9 mi) long, and has a basin area of 4,257 km^{2} (1,644 sq mi). Its average discharge at the mouth is 150 m^{3}/s (5,300 cu ft/s).

Until the late 19th century, it was only possible to reach Hallstatt (at the Hallstätter See) by boat or via narrow trails. However, this secluded and inhospitable landscape nevertheless counts as one of the first places of human settlement due to the rich sources of natural salt, which was mined for thousands of years, originally in the shape of hearts. Some of Hallstatt's oldest archaeological finds, such as a shoe-last celt – a long thin stone tool used to fell trees and to work wood – date back to around 5000 B.C. One of the first blacksmith's sites was excavated there. Active trade and thus wealth allowed for the development of a highly sophisticated society, hence the term Hallstatt culture. In 1846, a large prehistoric cemetery was discovered close by the current location of Hallstatt. There is little room for cemeteries so every ten years bones used to be exhumed and removed into an ossuary to make room for new burials. A collection of elaborately decorated skulls with the owners' names, professions, death dates inscribed on them is on display at the local chapel.

== Gallery ==
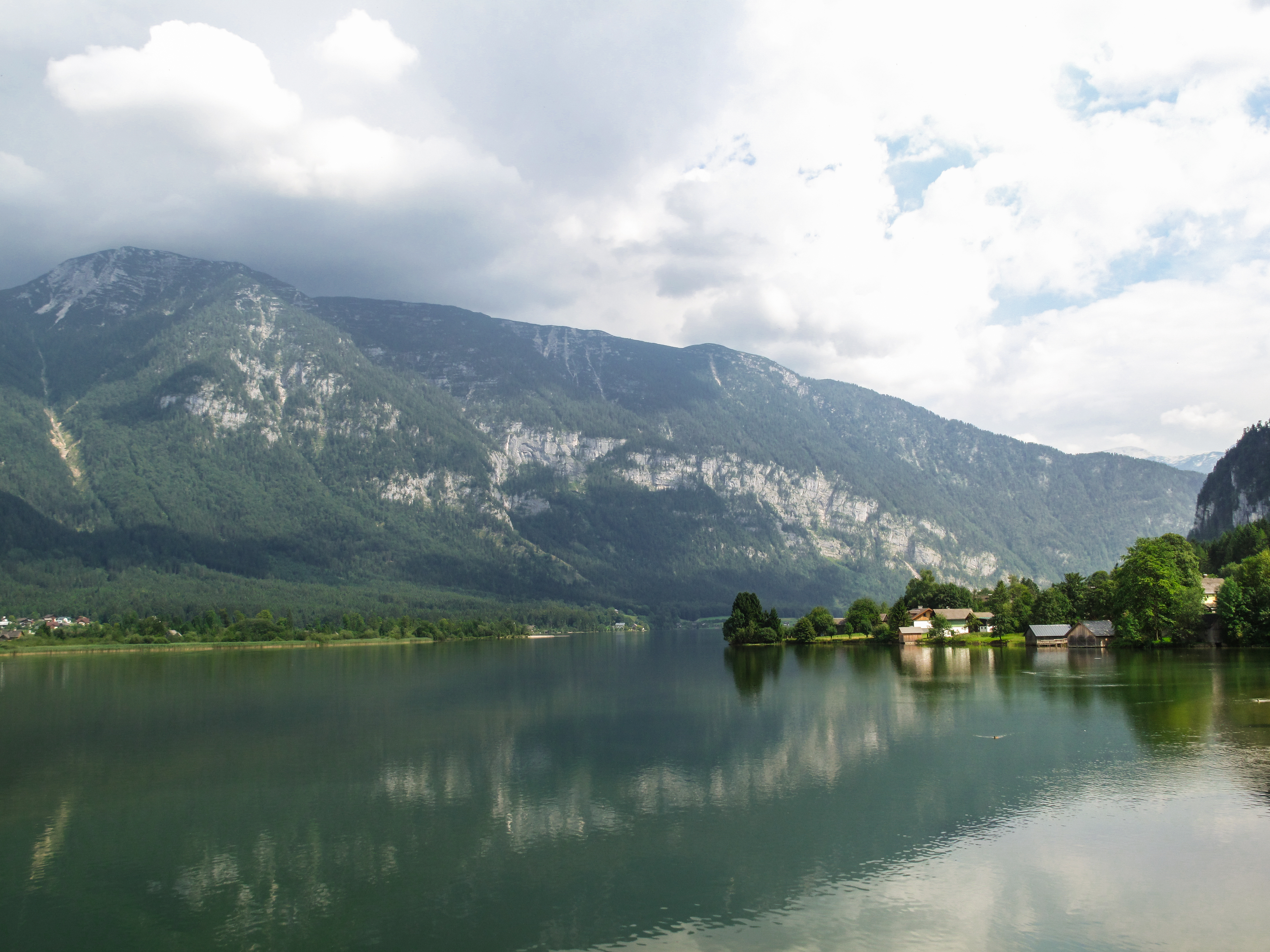
The river Traun between Au and Steeg (two districts of Bad Goisern)

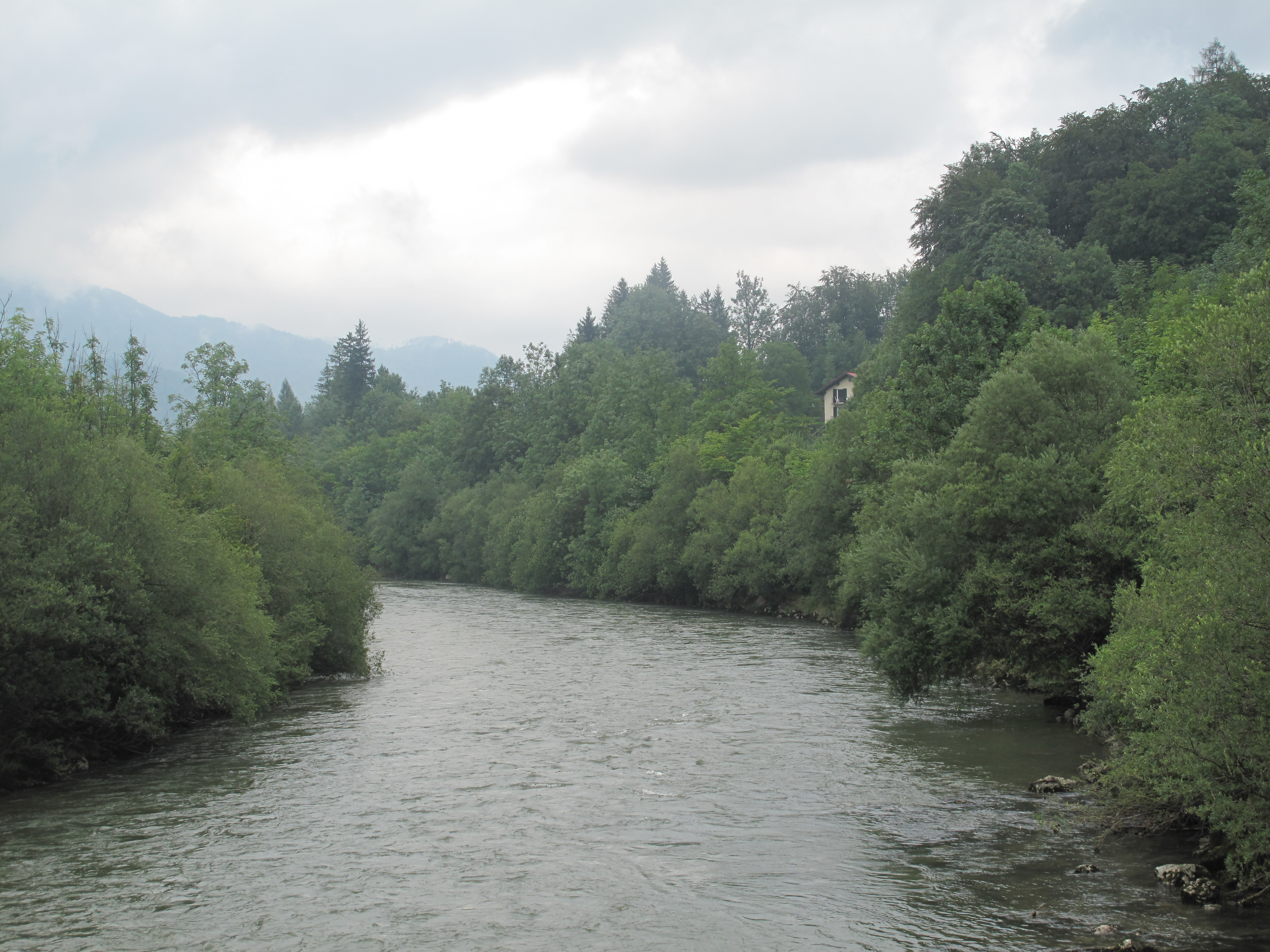
The Traun near Lauffen
