= Austrian resistance =

Resistance during World War II

The Austrian resistance (German: Österreichischer Widerstand) was launched in response to the rise of fascism across Europe and, more specifically, to the Anschluss in 1938 and resulting annexation of the Austrian Republic by Nazi Germany.

An estimated 100,000 people were reported to have participated in this resistance with thousands subsequently imprisoned or executed for their anti-Nazi activities.

One cipher of the Austrian resistance used from 1944 onward was O5, indicating "OE," another way of writing the letter Ö which begins the German name of the country; '5' indicated the fifth letter of the alphabet (E). This sign may be seen at St. Stephen's Cathedral, Vienna. From 1939, the Nazi regime did not use the term Österreich; when Austria was referred to, it was as Ostmark ('Eastern march'), with the implication that Austria was merely an outer region of Greater Germany and not a country in its own right.

The Moscow Declarations of 1943 laid a framework for the establishment of a free Austria after the victory over Nazi Germany. It stated that "Austria is reminded, however that she has a responsibility, which she cannot evade, for participation in the war on the side of Hitlerite Germany, and that in the final settlement account will inevitably be taken of her own contribution to her liberation."

== Overview ==
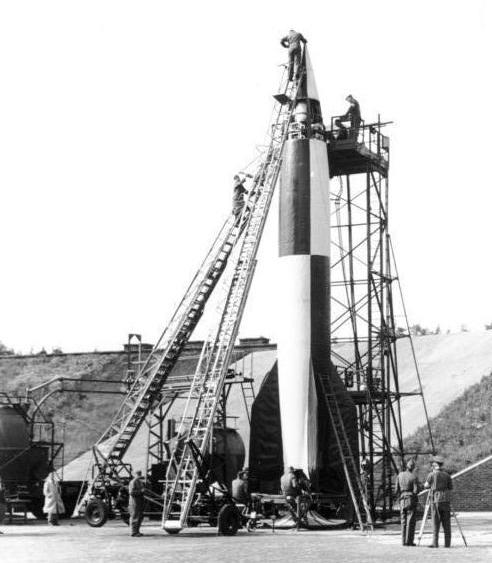
Plans and production locations for the V-2 were supplied to the Allies by Heinrich Maier's group.

The Austrian resistance groups were often ideologically separated and reflected the spectrum of political parties before the war.

Austrian resistance efforts included a group led by priest Heinrich Maier. This resistance group sought to reestablish a Habsburg monarchy after the war. It played a large role in providing the Allies with information on the production sites of the V-1, V-2 rockets, Tiger tanks, and aircraft such as the Messerschmitt Bf 109 and Messerschmitt Me 163 Komet. The intelligence they provided, later uncovered by the Gestapo, was necessary in enabling the Allies to conduct precise airstrikes, minimizing civilian casualties. The group maintained contact with Allen Dulles, head of the U.S. OSS in Switzerland, and their information contributed to key operations such as Operation Crossbow and Operation Hydra, both of which were precursors to Operation Overlord. The Maier group was also one of the earliest to report the mass murder of Jews, utilizing contacts at the Semperit factory near Auschwitz.

In addition to armed resistance, numerous individuals provided support to Jewish families during the Holocaust. These efforts included hiding individuals, managing or exchanging their property to generate funds, and aiding their escape from Nazi persecution. These actions carried immense personal risk, as assisting Jews was punishable by imprisonment or death in Nazi concentration camps. Among these individuals were Rosa Stallbaumer and her husband, Anton. Arrested by the Gestapo in 1942, they were sent to Dachau concentration camp. Although Anton survived, Rosa Stallbaumer did not; transferred to Auschwitz, she died there at age 44.

== Austrian resistance organizations and groups ==
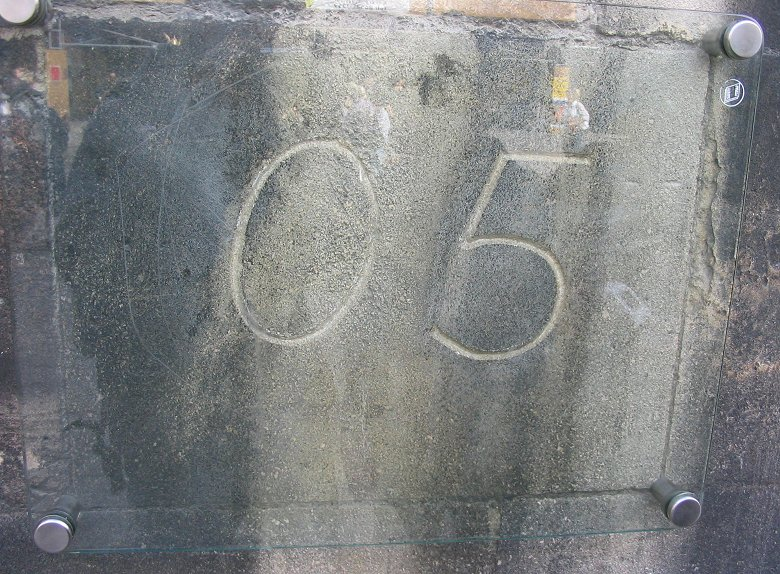
Sign of the Austrian resistance movement at the St. Stephen's Cathedral, Vienna

=== Non-partisan groups ===
- O5, New Free Austria, Helfenberg, Prinz Eugen (founded during the Balkan campaign, the group name is associated with Prinz Eugen's military strategy) and others.

=== Armed groups ===
- Carinthian Slovenes as partisans of Carinthia (see Yugoslav partisans) and the partisan Austrian Freedom Front which was led by a Communist leader Franz Honner and was supported by the USSR. This partisan group also established close cooperation with Tito's partisans, and two Austrian battalions fought with them. By the end of the war, the Austrian Freedom Front had become the only armed movement in Austria.

The other groups often referred to partisans in the Salzkammergut (group "Willy Fred") or in the Ötztal. The resistance group in Ötztal founded by Wolfgang Pfaundler and Hubert Sauerwein in 1941. Around 50 people belonged to this group. Apart from their political activity, in the beginning they did not go beyond the construction and arming phase.

- One major league of 200–300 fighters called the Koralmpartisanen. Their activities extended from 1944 to Western Styria. They began to attack in the districts of Leibnitz and Deutschlandsberg (Styria) infrastructure facilities such as municipal offices and gendarmerie. They also sabotaged militarily important facilities such as bridges and railways.
- Also in Styria, in the area around the Erzberg, in the area of Ennstal, there were different resistance groups. The aim of the actions was mainly the paralyzing of rail transport and the front replenishment. The communist group centered around the miners Martin Michelli, Johann Pech, Siegfried Pichler and Alexander Soukup planned, among other things, the demolition of bridges of Erzbergbahn, but was arrested by the Gestapo in late 1941 and the members largely sentenced to death.
- The so-called Salzkammergut partisans under the direction of the im August 1943 fled from the concentration camp Hallein communist Spain fighter Sepp Plieseis hid in a hideout ("hedgehog"/"Igel") at the "Ischler Hütte" (Ischler cottage) in the Totes Gebirge and maintained close contact with resistance circles in the area. The difficult and dangerous supply was done by dedicated women from the valley. In fact, in order to avoid reprisals against the civilian population, the group did not have an armed man, combat taken or violent actions set. Karl Feldhammer from Bad Aussee was, however, in the course of his arrest by the Gestapo Linz shot on January 26, 1945. His wife was Marianne "Mariandl" Feldhammer. In the Salzkammergut from the end of April 1945 also acted from the British SOE in the mountains of hell remote combat group under the leadership of the former socialist Albrecht Gaiswinkler from Bad Aussee.
- Both resistance groups appeared politically in the wake of the liberation by US troops in early May 1945 and participated in the rescue of the stolen art from all over Europe, which were stored in a tunnel of the salt mine in Aussee. These resistance fighters were also involved in the arrest of Nazi criminals like Ernst Kaltenbrunner.
- Resistance in (state) enterprises: Franz Josef Messner (also a member of the catholic antifascist freedom movement Maier-Messner-Caldonazzi)
- Intelligence agency (Abwehr) resistance: Erwin von Lahousen He joined the resistance circle against Hitler within the 'defense'. It is believed that he kept his contact network with British, Czechoslovaks and Russian agents during the war. Lahousen ordered that agents destined for Britain be trained primarily for spying, also with disastrous results. The case Lahausen is very controversial, there are different opinions. Various publications have been published that speak for him.
- Military resistance in the Wehrmacht: Robert Bernardis, Heinrich Kodré, group around Major Carl Szokoll (including Operation Walküre / Operation Valkyrie) Major Karl Biedermann, Hauptmann Alfred Huth and Oberleutnant Rudolf Raschke joined the resistance group of Austrian members of the Wehrmacht, led by Major Carl Szokoll, within the Wehrkreiskommando XVII. In the spring of 1945, this planned the "Operation Radetzky" whose goal was to assist the Red Army in the liberation of Vienna and to prevent major destruction. Biedermann should have occupied with his troops key positions in the city and to prevent the blowing up of bridges. But the planned for April 6, 1945 "Operation Radetzky" was betrayed. Robert Bernardis, Heinrich Kodré, Karl Biedermann, Alfred Huth and Rudolf Raschke were sentenced to death by the German "People's Court" (Volksgerichtshof) and executed the same day. In 1967 a barrack was named "Biedermann-Huth-Raschke barracks" (1140 Vienna, Penzing), in remembrance of these three Austrian officers of the German Wehrmacht Major Karl Biedermann, Captain Alfred Huth and Lieutenant Rudolf Raschke.

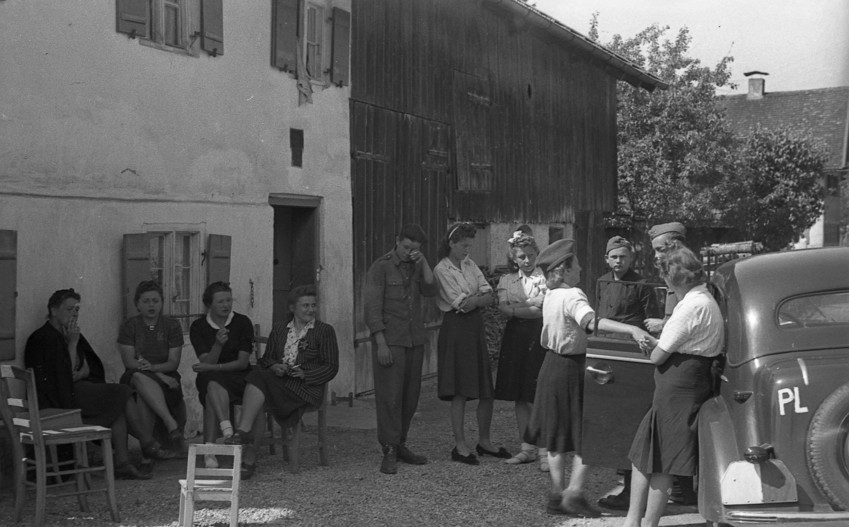
Group of women. One woman wears an Austrian resistance Edelweiss – Patch, which comes from a former hunting clothes; and a pinstripe (in German: Nadelstreif) blazer. Other girls standing close to the car, talking and flirting with Wehrmacht soldier. The car has a PL font over turn signal. It could be a soldier who came from the front or one who cares about the engagement of the soldiers on the Eastern Front. Two further girls dressed in French style (shoes and hair). Two young men wear work uniforms. One a woodwork robe the other a baker or cook robe. Estimated time & location: Summer 1941, Lower Austria – Surrounding: Amstetten-Mauer. (Photo source: spiegel.de)

=== Catholic conservative bourgeois camp ===
- Antinazi freedom movement of Austria, the group Maier-Messner-Caldonazzi
- The CV (Cartellverband): an umbrella organization of catholic male student fraternities, which Maier and Caldonazzi also belonged.
- Tyrolean resistance movement
- The two groups called "Austrian Freedom Movement" around Roman Scholz and Karl Lederer. Already in autumn 1938, the Augustinian canon Roman Karl Scholz founded a resistance group together with his friend Viktor Reimann. On an earlier trip to England Scholz had been able to make political connections there. After the "Anschluss Österreichs" he sent regular reports on the situation in Austria and the activities of the resistance, which he had translated into English by his colleague Rüdiger Engerth. The networking of his resistance group spread from Vienna to Lower Austria (Mostviertel, areas around Baden), Upper Austria and Tyrol. In 1939, the Gestapo spy Otto Hartmann joined the scene. The leading officials Roman Karl Scholz, Gerhard Fischer-Ledenice, Hans Zimmerl, Hanns-Georg Heintschel-Heinegg, Karl Lederer, Rudolf Wallner, Alfred Miegl, Augustin Grosser, Günther Loch and Jakob Kastelic were first brought to prisons before the People's Court in 1944, sentenced to death and executed in Vienna's Landesgericht in the same year. It is believed people around Roman Scholz (Austrian Freedom Movement) were involved in Operation Anthropoid – the assassination of Reinhard Heydrich (see media). The Abbot of the Cistercian Monastery Wilhering Petrus (Bernhard) Burgstaller died in 1941 in Anrath Prison. In or at the consequences of the detention died Lieutenant a. D. Richard Färber, Adolf Gubitzer, Heinrich Hock and Marie Schlagenhauser.
- ''Great Austrian Freedom Movement" as a group around Jacob Kastelic
- "Östfrei" a monarchist resistance group around Wilhelm von Hebra
- The sermons of the Baptist Arnold Köster with frequently interspersed Nazi criticism
- Numerous priests like Hermann Kagerer, Johann Gruber, Andreas Rieser, Matthias Spanlang, Konrad Just and Johann Steinbock, Peter August Blandénier, Maria Restituta, the Priests Jakob Gapp and Otto Neururer, the Father Franz Reinisch, the Provikar Carl Lampert
- Legitimist resistance groups: During the Nazi era confessed legitimists were persecuted by the National Socialists, as they considered Otto von Habsburg as their rightful head of state and refused the German Reich's oath of allegiance. Approximately 4,500 legitimists and their loved ones were arrested and sent to concentration camps. Even during the Second World War, this group played a significant role in resistance and exile. On May 24, 1938, according to the State Commissioner, the following legitimistic associations were held as opposing organizations and associations with the Reich Governor in Vienna (Gen. Kdo XVII, Wehrkreiskdo. XVII, IC Az. 1p 12 No. 471/38): Eiserner Ring, Arbeitsgemeinschaft österreichischer Vereine, Akademischer Bund katholischer Österreichischer Landsmannschaften, Schwarzgoldenes Kartell, Altherrenbund "Raethe-Teutonia", Vaterländische Wehrschaft "Ostmark", Lichtensteinrunde, Vereinigung ehemaliger Theresianisten, Mitpatenschaft Wiener Frauen und Mädchen, Union bürgerlicher Kaufleute, Altkaiserjäger-Klub, Kameradschaft ehemaliger "7-er", Verband ehemaliger Berufsoffiziere Österreichs, Vaterländischer Ring österreichischer Soldaten, Österreichisch-legitimistische Arbeitsgemeinschaft, Reichsbund der Österreicher, Österreichische Front, Schwarzgelbe Volkspartei, Österreichisches Donaurettungskorps, Österreichische Jugendbewegung "Ottonia", Jungsturm "Ostmark", Jung-österreichischer Bund, Vaterländischer Jugendverband Österreichs, Österreichischer Jungsturm, Bund der katholischen deutschen Jugend, Karl Vogelsang-Bund, "Die Habichtsburger", Kaisertreue Volksbewegung, Legitimistischer Volksbund Österreich, Legitimistische Ärzteschaft Österreichs, Verband Altösterreich, Kaisertreuer Volksverband (Wolff-Verband)
- The group Burian
- the group Zemljak
- the group Müller-Thanner
- the Illegale Austrian Imperial loyalty front, the union of catholic noble people in Austria (1938 forbidden, see also Austria nobility and the national socialism)
- the group around Otto von Habsburg
- Other groups: "Jehovah's Witnesses"

=== Workers' and leftist groups ===
- Groups emerging from social democracy, such as the Revolutionary Socialists of Austria (RSÖ) and the Socialist Workers Assistance (SAH), were assisted by exile groups such as the Austrian Social-Democrat Foreign Office (ALÖS), the Representation of the Austrian Socialists (AVOES) and the Austrian Labor Committee.
- Group 40: After WW II historians named and summarized resistance fighters "Group 40". Details follow link
- Communist Party of Austria (KPÖ), Communist Youth Association of Austria (KJVÖ), for example Leo Gabler, Anna Gräf, Rosa Hofmann, Hermann Langbein
- Independent communist groups such as: Trotskyist, Austrian fight bund for the liberation of the working class, the organization Against the Current (OG), the Mischlingsliga Wien (collection basin of "Mischlinge" in the sense of the Nuremberg Laws, initiated by Otto Horn and Otto Ernst Andreasch), by Karl Hudomalj founded anti-Hitler movement of Austria and the Revolutionary Communists of Austria (RKÖ)
- Carinthia: Catholic, Slovenian, Socialist and Communist resistance fighters were arrested, tried or sent to concentration camps by the Gestapo. In three spectacular trials, 31 Slovenian members of the "Green Squad" and communist resistance fighters were sentenced to death and executed by Roland Freisler, President of the People's Court.

=== Other ===
- Civil servants: Marie Schönfeld, Franz Schönfeld
- In exile: Austrian Democratic Union (August 1941 – 1945), London.
- Silent heroes: for example: Gottfried von Einem, Ella Lingens

== Formation ==
The movement had a prehistory of socialist and communist activism against the era of Austrofascism from 1934. Although the Austrofascist regime was itself intensely hostile to Nazism, especially after the Austrian Nazis' failed coup attempt in 1934, known as the July Putsch.

Notable activists included Josef Plieseis and Hilde Zimmermann.

The symbol and voice of Austrian resistance was Crown Prince Otto von Habsburg who, had the monarchy been reestablished, would have been Kaiser of Austria.

== Activities ==
Much as opposing the Nazis was difficult, as maintaining organizational cohesion post the Anschluss constituted a penal offence, resistance activities were maintained throughout the period. The resistance mainly: issued counter-Nazi political leaflets; collected donations, which were mostly distributed to families of those arrested; and provided the Allies with information.

Military resistance was limited to occasional sabotage to both key civil and military installations, with most resisting by avoiding postings to the active war fronts.

Most armed resistance was undertaken in Carinthia. Carinthian Slovenes formed a nucleus to the resistance after targeted deportations and forced Germanisation by the Nazi regime in 1942 led to the establishment of forest bands. As much of the Slovene Lands in Yugoslavia had been annexed to the Reich in 1941 and were subject to the same tactics of ethnic cleansing in northern Slovenia the group's activities should be seen in the context of the Yugoslavian Slovene Partisan operations.

== Habsburg opposition ==
Former Crown Prince Otto von Habsburg denounced Nazism, stating:

I absolutely reject [Nazi] Fascism for Austria ... This un-Austrian movement promises everything to everyone, but really intends the most ruthless subjugation of the Austrian people ... The people of Austria will never tolerate that our beautiful fatherland should become an exploited colony, and that the Austrian should become a man of second category.

He strongly opposed the Anschluss, and in 1938 requested Austrian Chancellor Kurt Schuschnigg to resist Nazi Germany and supported an international intervention, and offered to return from exile to take over the reins of government in order to repel the Nazis. According to Gerald Warner, "Austrian Jews were among the strongest supporters of a Habsburg restoration, since they believed the dynasty would give the nation sufficient resolve to stand up to the Third Reich". Following the German annexation of Austria, Otto (who had been allowed to come back to Austria to publicly campaign against the Anschluss), was sentenced to death by the Nazi regime; Rudolf Hess ordered that Otto was to be executed immediately if caught, as ordered by Adolf Hitler. The leaders of the Austrian legitimist movement, i.e. supporters of Otto, were arrested by the Nazis and largely executed. Otto's cousins Maximilian, Duke of Hohenberg, and Prince Ernst of Hohenberg, both sons of the late Archduke Francis Ferdinand, whose assassination in 1914 precipitated World War I, were arrested in Vienna by the Gestapo and sent to Dachau where they remained throughout Nazi rule. Otto was involved in helping around 50,000 Austrians, including tens of thousands of Austrian Jews, flee the country at the beginning of the Second World War.

During his wartime exile in the United States, Otto and his younger brothers founded an "Austrian Battalion" in the United States Army, but it was delayed and never saw actual combat.

== Religious group resistance ==
The organizational cohesion offence was most keenly felt by the Austrian religious community. The Nazis, via both the civil Gestapo and police, and the military Schutzstaffel (SS), implemented both anti-religious and anti-Austrian-patriotic measures. This brought about disparate resistance from many established religious groups, whose core members came mainly from the establishment of Austrian high society.

=== Catholic Church ===
Although tolerated to a large extent, noted anti-Catholic measures and regional imposition of such brought about the formation of three large regional Catholic-based resistance groups.

The first purge and arrest round occurred in Spring 1940, when the three groups had held talks on merging, in which over 100 activists were arrested, interrogated and some individuals tortured. After this, the leaders sought closer ties to the main body of the Austrian resistance movement, and although remaining separate in part for security reasons, began feeding both directly and indirectly information to the United States Military Intelligence Service (MIS).

Amongst the Catholic group's members were Burgtheater actor Otto Hartmann, a spy in paid service of the Gestapo. In late 1944, his information led to the arrest of 10 key Catholic resistance organisation leaders, who were all tortured and then sentenced to death. These included the main contacts with the American MIS, Semperit Director General Franz Josef Messner (1896–1945, killed in the gas chambers at the Mauthausen concentration camp), and Chaplain Dr. Heinrich Maier (1908–1945) executed on 22 March 1945 as the last victim of the Nazi régime in Vienna. Other detainees were sentenced to long prison terms, which some survived but many were killed before the final surrender.

== The exile community in London ==
The main organised exile group during the Second World War was based around the Austrian Office in London, centre to the 30,000 strong exile community. The Austrian Society, or "Austrian Office", was home to both the monarchist Austrian League and liberal Austrian Democratic Union.

== Battle of Castle Itter ==
The Austrian resistance were involved in the Battle of Castle Itter, the Austrian village of Itter in the North Tyrol, was fought on 5 May 1945, only three days before Germany's unconditional surrender came into effect. Troops of the 23rd Tank Battalion of the US 12th Armored Division led by Lieutenant John C. "Jack" Lee Jr., anti-Nazi German Army soldiers, and imprisoned French VIPs defended the castle against an attacking force from the 17th Waffen-SS Panzer Grenadier Division until relief from the American 142nd Infantry Regiment arrived.

== Perspective ==
Austrian society has had an ambivalent attitude both toward the Nazi government from 1938 to 1945 and the few that actively resisted it. Since large portions of Austrian society either actively or tacitly supported the Nazi regime, the Allied forces treated Austria as a belligerent party in the war and maintained occupation of it after the Nazi capitulation. On the other hand, the Moscow Declaration labeled Austria as a free and democratic society before the war, and considered its capture an act of liberation.

== See also ==
- Documentation Centre of Austrian Resistance
- Category:Austrian resistance fighters
- Victim List of CV
- Polish Underground State
- Austria under National Socialism#Austrian resistance
- Media: https://www.youtube.com/watch?v=QV7YZjdjXhs (Resistance starts 1 h,31 min.)
- Media ÖCV Resistance: https://www.youtube.com/watch?v=MnWpKV6tAsA
