= List of governments in exile during World War II =

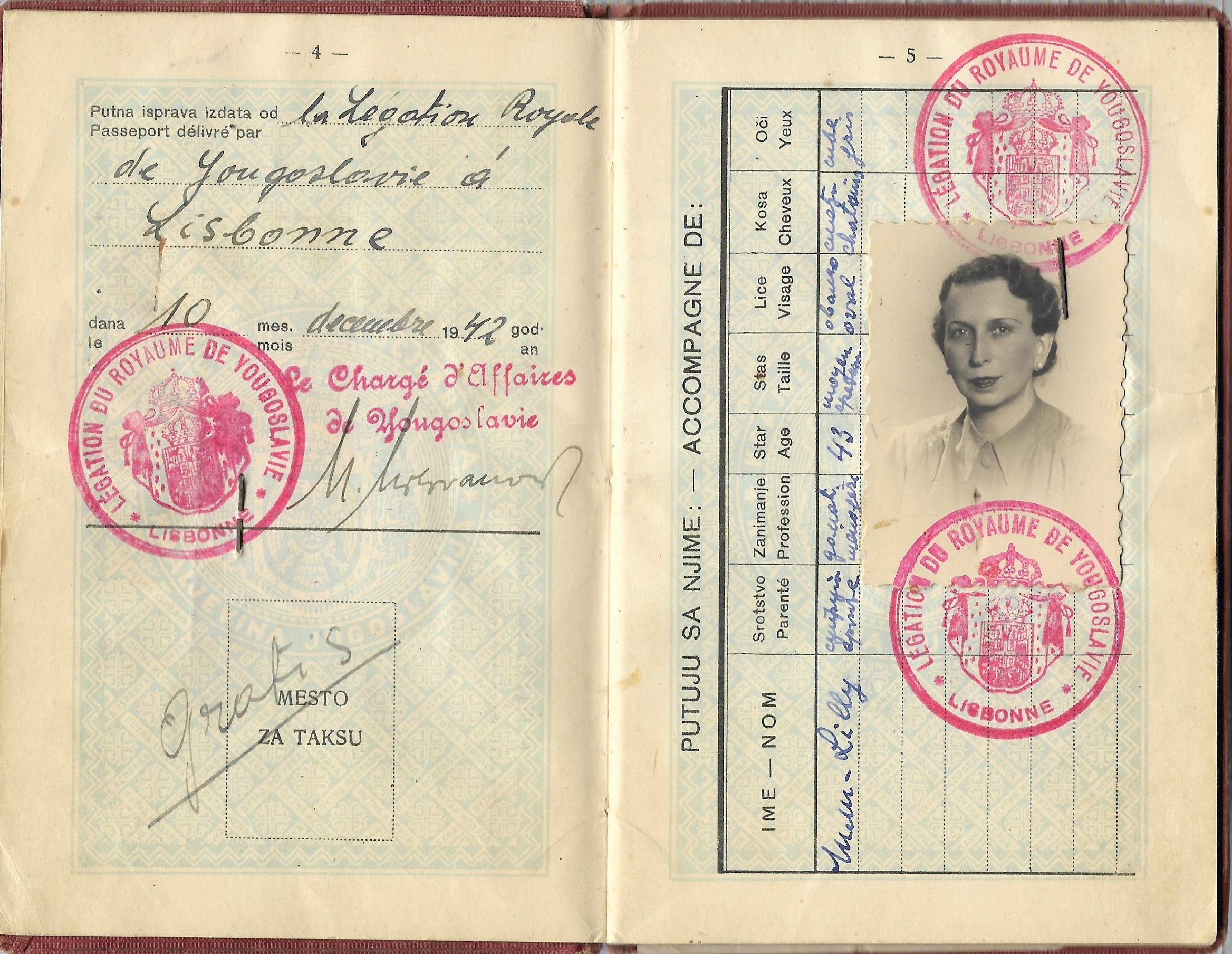
Passport issued in 1942 by the exiled Yugoslav government.

Many countries established governments in exile during World War II. The Second World War caused many governments to lose sovereignty as their territories came under occupation by enemy powers. Governments in exile sympathetic to the Allied or Axis powers were established away from the fighting.

== Allied-aligned wartime governments ==
Many European governments relocated to London during the period of Axis occupation, while other organizations were established in Australia and the United States to oppose occupation by Japan. The following list includes exiled colonial governments alongside those of sovereign nations, as well as resistance groups organized abroad that did not claim the full sovereignty of a government in exile.

Name	Location	Date of establishment in exile	Date of dissolution or return	State controlling its claimed territory	Notes	Leaders
(Austria) Austrian Office	London	August 1941	May 1945	Nazi Germany	There was never an Austrian government-in-exile after the Anschluss, but London was the home of a 30,000-strong exile community. The Austrian Society (or Office) was home to both the monarchist Austrian League and liberal Austrian Democratic Union. Though not officially recognised by the Allies, the British Government gave its support.	Austrian Democratic Union and Austrian League
(Belgium) Belgian Pierlot IV Government	Bordeaux, then London	October 1940	September 1944	Nazi Germany	Belgium's King Leopold III surrendered alongside his army – contrary to the advice of his government – and remained a prisoner for the rest of the war. The government in exile, without the king, continued to administer the Belgian Congo and coordinate the Free Belgian Forces and Belgian Resistance.	Prime Minister; Hubert Pierlot
(British rule in Burma) Government of British Burma in exile	Shimla	May 1942	October 1945	Empire of Japan, Phibun-era Thailand	Dorman-Smith was appointed as the 2nd Governor of Burma from 6 May 1941, so was in office when the Japanese conquered most of the colony. Between May 1942 and Oct 1945 he was in exile at Simla, India.	Governor Reginald Dorman-Smith
(Czechoslovakia) Czechoslovak National Liberation Committee	Paris, then London	October 1939	April 1945	Nazi Germany, Protectorate of Bohemia and Moravia, Slovakia	A few months after the breakup of Czechoslovakia, former President Beneš organized a committee in exile and sought recognition as the government of the Czechoslovak Republic, absorbing its remaining embassies. Its success in obtaining intelligence and coordinating actions by the Resistance led Britain and the other Allies to recognize it in 1941.	President Edvard Beneš; Prime Minister Jan Šrámek
(Denmark) Danish Freedom Council	Stockholm	16 September 1943	May 1945	Occupation government of Denmark (1940–43) Nazi Germany (1943–45)	During the Occupation of Denmark the country did not establish a government in exile. King Christian and his government remained in Denmark and operated with relative independence until August 1943. The Freedom Council was an unrecognized group that coordinated the Danish resistance movement. From 1941, Ambassador Henrik Kauffmann engaged in diplomacy with the Allies on Denmark's behalf without regard for the occupation government in Copenhagen.	Børge Houmann, Mogens Fog, Arne Sørensen, Frode Jakobsen, Erling Foss Aage Schoch
Government of the Dutch East Indies in exile	Brisbane	8 March 1942 (unofficial); 23 December 1943 (official)	1 October 1945	Empire of Japan	In 1944, the government in exile and the Allied high command organized the Netherlands Indies Civil Administration, tasked with restoring Dutch rule in the islands.	Acting Governor-General Hubertus van Mook
Free France	London, Brazzaville, and Algiers	18 June 1940	25 August 1944	Nazi Germany, Vichy France, Kingdom of Italy	De Gaulle called for resistance in France and its colonies in the Appeal of 18 June. The government organized the French Resistance, gathered military forces, and gradually took control of French colonies around the world. In 1944, it became the Provisional Government of the French Republic.	Charles de Gaulle, Henri Giraud, French Committee of National Liberation (from 1943)
(Kingdom of Greece) Greek Cairo Government	Cairo and London	24 May 1941	17 October 1944	Nazi Germany, Fascist Italy, Bulgaria	The exiled royal government was recognized internationally and by the Greek Resistance early in the war. It heavily depended on Britain. In 1944, leftist resistance groups set up Free Greece as a rival government. These governments agreed to merge at the Lebanon Conference.	King George II; Prime Minister: Emmanouil Tsouderos (1941–1944), Sofoklis Venizelos (1944), Georgios Papandreou (1944–1945)
(Luxembourg) Luxembourgish government in London	Paris, Lisbon, then London and Montreal	1940	1944	Nazi Germany	Grand Duchess Charlotte and the grand ducal family moved to Montreal. The government in London directed its diplomatic efforts toward assuring the country's survival and recognition as a full member of the Allies, despite its weak military capability.	Grand Duchess Charlotte; Prime Minister: Pierre Dupong
(Netherlands) Dutch London Cabinet	London	10 May 1940	5 May 1945	Nazi Germany	Besides supporting the Dutch resistance, the government attempted to maintain Allied control of the Netherlands' colonies. It agreed to place the Dutch Caribbean and Guiana under UK and US protection, but lost the East Indies to Japanese occupation.	Queen Wilhelmina; Prime Minister: Dirk Jan de Geer (1940), Pieter Sjoerds Gerbrandy (1940–1945)
(Norway) Norwegian Nygaardsvold's Cabinet	London	7 June 1940	31 May 1945	Nazi Germany	Governed the Free Norwegian forces throughout the war.	King Haakon VII; Prime Minister: Johan Nygaardsvold
Government of the Commonwealth of the Philippines in exile	Melbourne, then Washington, D.C.	January 1942	October 1944	Empire of Japan, Second Philippine Republic	Moving from Melbourne to Washington in 1944, the Quezon government participated in the Pacific War Council alongside other Allied powers. The Philippine Commonwealth Army re-took the islands alongside American forces.	President: Manuel Quezon (1942–44), Sergio Osmeña (1944); High Commissioner: F.B. Sayre (1942), Harold L. Ickes (1942–1945)
Government of the Republic of Poland in exile	Paris, then Angers, then London	17/30 September 1939	22 December 1990	Nazi Germany, Soviet Union	The Polish Government never formally surrendered to the Nazis or USSR. It organized the Polish Armed Forces in the West and coordinated the Polish Underground State and Home Army. It remained active in exile during the war as well after the Polish People's Republic took power. It lost the recognition of the major Allied powers in July 1945 and its last international recognition in 1972 but continued until the Fall of Communism in Poland in 1989–90.	President: Władysław Raczkiewicz; Prime Minister: Władysław Sikorski (1939–1943), Stanisław Mikołajczyk (1943–1944), Tomasz Arciszewski (1944–1945)
(Thailand) Free Thai Movement	Washington, D.C.	1942	1945	Phibun-era Thailand, Empire of Japan	Seni Pramoj, the Thai ambassador to the US, refused to deliver his country's declaration of war in January 1942. He organized the Free Thai Movement with American assistance, recruiting Thai students in the United States for underground resistance activities.	Seni Pramoj
Government of the Kingdom of Yugoslavia in Exile	London	21 June 1941	March 1946	Nazi Germany, Italy, Hungary, Bulgaria, Croatia	The royalist government supported the Chetniks in their resistance to Axis occupation, but the anti-royalist Communist-led Yugoslav Partisans gained strength over the course of the war. In the Tito–Šubašić Agreements of June 1944, the Partisans and the government in exile agreed to merge their governments. Tito was victorious after the end of the occupation, and the monarchy was not restored.	King Peter II; Prime Minister: Dušan Simović (1941–1942), Slobodan Jovanović (1942–1943), Miloš Trifunović (1943), Božidar Purić (1943–1944), Ivan Šubašić (1944–1945)

== Axis-aligned wartime governments ==
The Axis powers hosted governments-in-exile in their territory. Most belonged to Axis-sponsored puppet regimes whose territory came under Allied occupation late in the war. The purpose of many of these organizations was to recruit and organize military units composed of their nationals in the host country.

Name	Location	Date of establishment in exile	Date of dissolution or return	State/entity claiming the controlled territory	Leaders	Notes
(Belarus) Belarusian Central Council	Königsberg and Berlin	1944	April 1995	Soviet Union ( Byelorussian SSR)	President Radasłaŭ Astroŭski	Members of the puppet administration were evacuated with the retreating Germans, where they resumed the work as a "government in exile".
Kingdom of Bulgaria	Vienna and Altaussee	16 September 1944	10 May 1945	Kingdom of Bulgaria (Fatherland Front)	Prime Minister Aleksandar Tsankov	Formed after the 1944 Bulgarian coup d'état brought socialists to power in Bulgaria, the government raised the 1st Bulgarian Regiment of the SS.
Sigmaringen Governmental Commission (Vichy France)	Sigmaringen	7 September 1944	23 April 1945	(France) Provisional Government of the French Republic	President Fernand de Brinon	Members of the collaborationist French cabinet at Vichy were relocated by the Germans to the Sigmaringen enclave in Germany, where they became a government-in-exile until April 1945. They were given formal governmental power over the city of Sigmaringen, and the three Axis governments – Germany, Italy and Japan – established there what were officially their Embassies to France. Pétain having refused to take part in this, it was headed by de Brinon.
Hellenic State	Vienna	September 1944	April 1945	Kingdom of Greece	Prime Minister Ektor Tsironikos	After the liberation of Greece, a new collaborationist government was established in Vienna from former collaborationist ministers, headed by the former minister Ektor Tsironikos. They were captured during the Vienna offensive.
Government of National Unity (Hungary)	Vienna and Munich	28/29 March 1945	7 May 1945	Czechoslovak government-in-exile, Democratic Federal Yugoslavia Yugoslav government-in-exile	Leader of the Nation Ferenc Szálasi	The Szálasi government fled in the face of the Soviet advance through Hungary. Most of its leaders were arrested in the following months.
(Azad Hind) Provisional Government of Free India	Singapore, Rangoon and Port Blair	21 October 1943	18 August 1945	British Raj	Subhas Chandra Bose	Azad Hind was established as a provisional government of India that would fight for independence from the British Raj. The government was given control of Japanese-occupied territory in far eastern India and the Andaman and Nicobar Islands. It issued currency notes and established bilateral relationships with anti-British countries. Its military was Azad Hind Fauj, or the Indian National Army.
Montenegrin State Council	Zagreb	Summer of 1944	8 May 1945	Democratic Federal Yugoslavia	Head of the State Council Sekula Drljević	After the Germans withdrew from Montenegro, the fascist leader Sekula Drljević created a government-in-exile in the Independent State of Croatia (NDH). He set up the Montenegrin National Army together with the Croatian fascist leader Ante Pavelić. However, his government was dissolved after the fall of the NDH.
Second Philippine Republic	Nara and Tokyo	11 June 1945	17 August 1945	United States, (Commonwealth of the Philippines) Philippine Commonwealth	President Jose P. Laurel	After the Allies liberated the archipelago and reestablished the Commonwealth of the Philippines, the Second Philippine Republic went into exile in Japan.
Legionary Romania	Vienna	August 1944	8 May 1945	Kingdom of Romania	Prime Minister Horia Sima	Germany had imprisoned Horia Sima and other members of the Iron Guard following the Legionnaires' rebellion of 1941. In 1944, King Michael's Coup brought a pro-Allied government to power in Romania. In response Germany released Sima to establish a pro-Axis government in exile.
Government of National Salvation (Serbia)	Kitzbühel and Vienna	4 October 1944	1945	Democratic Federal Yugoslavia	Prime Minister Milan Nedić	With the onset of the Belgrade Offensive by the Red Army and the Partisans, the collaborationist government was evacuated from Serbia to Kitzbühel, Austria in October 1944. There, the Nedić administration continued to hold sessions and tried to raise a new army to fight Tito's partisans, though the plan failed due to the Germans wanting the troops to fight on other, more important fronts, which Nedić refused. After that the Germans dismissed him.
Slovak Republic	Kremsmünster, Austria	4 April 1945	8 May 1945	Soviet Union, Czechoslovak Republic	President Jozef Tiso	The government of the Slovak Republic went into exile on 4 April 1945 when the Red Army captured Bratislava. The exiled government capitulated to the American General Walton Walker on 8 May 1945; they were handed over to Czechoslovak authorities.

== Governments of the Baltic States ==
In the aftermath of the occupation of the Baltic states by the Soviet Union, all three republics established some form of government in exile. These organizations persisted after the war as the territories were annexed to the USSR. They played a role in maintaining the State continuity of the Baltic states during the period of Soviet control.

Name	Location	Date of establishment in exile	Date of dissolution or return	State controlling its claimed territory	Leaders	Notes
(Estonia) Estonian Diplomatic Service	London and New York City	1940	1991	Soviet Union; Nazi Germany (1941–1944)	Johannes Kaiv (1940–1965)	Most Estonian diplomats refused to return home after the Soviet takeover. They remained in their posts in countries that recognized the republic's independence. The Estonian Diplomatic Service and the Estonian government-in-exile never officially recognized each other, though some officials served in both. The consulate-general in New York City remained active until 1991, since which time it has represented the independent Republic of Estonia.
(Estonia) Estonian government-in-exile	Stockholm and Oslo	1944 (unofficial), 1953 (official)	1992	Soviet Union	Prime Minister in duties of the President: Jüri Uluots (1944–1945); August Rei (1945–1963)	In September 1944, between the German retreat and Soviet advance, acting President Uluots appointed Tief as Prime Minister and asked him to form a government. On 22 September the government fled. When Uluots died, August Rei became the Prime Minister in the duties of the President. Rei was supported by the surviving members of the Tief government in Sweden. He declared an official government in exile in 1953 in Oslo which continued to operate until 8 October 1992.
(Latvia) Latvian diplomatic service in exile	London	1940	1991	Soviet Union; Nazi Germany (1941–1945)	Kārlis Reinholds Zariņš	One month before the Soviet occupation, Latvia's Cabinet of Ministers gave Zariņš, Ambassador to the United Kingdom, the power to supervise Latvia's foreign representations. This created a basis for a diplomatic service in the absence of an independent government in Latvia. The exiled diplomatic service continued after Latvia was annexed.
Supreme Committee for the Liberation of Lithuania (VLIK)	Reutlingen	1944	1992	Soviet Union; Nazi Germany (until 1944)	Chairman Steponas Kairys	VLIK was established to be an underground government during the German occupation of Lithuania. In 1944, when the Soviets advanced during the Baltic Offensive, most VLIK members fled to Germany. The committee tried to position itself as a Lithuanian government in exile, but it was never recognized by any foreign country. In 1955, it moved to New York City.

== Governments already in exile at the start of the war ==
These exiled regimes were operating at the start of World War II and involved themselves in the conflict to varying degrees.

Name	Location	Date of establishment in exile	Date of dissolution or return	State controlling its claimed territory	Leaders	Notes
Kingdom of Albania	London, then South Ascot and Parmoor	April 1939	2 January 1946	Albania, Fascist Italy	King Zog	King Zog fled the Italian invasion of Albania. The Albanian parliament voted to unite the country with Italy, giving the crown to Victor Emmanuel III. The Allies saw Zog as corrupt and unreliable and refused him recognition or cooperation. Zog's hopes of returning were dashed when the Albanian Partisans set up a communist government. He abdicated in 1946.
(Belarus) Rada of the Belarusian Democratic Republic	Prague, Paris	1919	Extant today	Soviet Union; Nazi Germany (1941–1944)	President: Vasil Zacharka (1928–1943); Mikoła Abramčyk (1944–1970)	The Belarusian People's Republic was formed in 1918 and its Rada went into exile in 1919 during the Polish–Soviet War. The Rada opposed the Belarusian Central Council, which collaborated with the German occupation. It left Prague when Soviet forces approached the city. The Rada is based in Toronto, the oldest current government in exile.
Ethiopian Empire	Bath	2 May 1936	18 January 1941	Fascist Italy	Emperor Haile Selassie; President of the Crown Council Kassa Haile Darge	The Emperor went into exile on 2 May 1936 during the Italian invasion of Ethiopia and soon settled in England. He coordinated with the Allies and joined the East African Campaign. In 1941, he returned to Ethiopia alongside British forces.
Government of the Democratic Republic of Georgia in Exile	Leuville-sur-Orge	18 March 1921	5 June 1954	Soviet Union	President Noe Zhordania	Formed after the Soviet invasion of Georgia of 1921, the government had lost diplomatic recognition by France and the League of Nations in 1933. Zhordania remained the acknowledged leader of the Georgian émigrés community in France and continued to act in this role under Nazi occupation.
Provisional Government of the Republic of Korea	Shanghai, later Chongqing	13 April 1919	15 August 1948	Korea under Japanese rule	President: Yi Dong-nyeong (1933–1940); Kim Koo (1940–1947)	The KPG formed the Korean Liberation Army in 1940, which fought in the Asia-Pacific Theatre. After a period of American occupation, the KPG's first President (in 1919–23) Syngman Rhee became the president of the First Republic of South Korea.
Sublime State of Persia	Geneva	1923	Extant today	Imperial State of Iran	Shah Fereydoun Mirza Qajar	The Qajar dynasty went into exile in 1923. They continue to claim the Iranian throne. During the war, Fereydoun Qajar's cousin and heir Hamid Mirza served in the British Royal Navy aboard HMS Duke of York and HMS Wild Goose.
(Second Spanish Republic) Spanish Republican government in exile	Paris, then Mexico City	4 April 1939	1 July 1977	Spanish State	President: Diego Martínez Barrio (1939–1940), Álvaro de Albornoz y Liminiana (1940–1945); Prime Minister: Juan Negrín	Created after Francisco Franco's coup d'état, the exiled government was first based in Paris but moved to Mexico City after the fall of France. The Allies largely ignored it to avoid provoking Franco into joining the Axis. After the war, the government returned to Paris and operated until Franco's death and the Spanish transition to democracy.
Ukrainian People's Republic	Warsaw	12 November 1920	22 August 1992	Soviet Union; Poland; Czechoslovakia; Romania; Nazi Germany (1941–1944)	Director Andriy Livytskyi	The government was organized after the Soviet occupation of Ukraine during the Russian Civil War. During the German occupation of Poland, the government was for the most part inactive. Livytski was interned by Germany but later was involved in Pavlo Shandruk's formation of the Ukrainian National Army, which fought under Nazi Germany.
