= Ernestine Diwisch =

Austrian political activist

Ernestine Diwisch (23 March 1921 – 24 May 1944) was an Austrian political activist (KPÖ). After 1938 she became caught up in anti-government resistance. She was arrested and taken to Berlin where she faced the special People's Court. She was convicted and sentenced to death on 8 February 1944. She was taken back to Vienna and executed on the guillotine that had been installed at the city's district court complex shortly after the German National Socialists had taken control of Austria.

== Biography ==
Ernestine "Erna" Diwisch was born in Vienna, the daughter of Anna Diwisch (born Anna Jezek) and a railway clerk. After completing her compulsory schooling she briefly attended a "Hausfrauenschule" (literally, "House wives school"). In May 1941 she took an office job at the Vienna office of the Allianz insurance company. Later she took a job with the aircraft engine plant in Wiener-Neustadt, to the south of Vienna.

- "In particular, the defendant Diwisch cannot have been simply a dumb helper, as the defence has contended. The communist attitudes of these defendants and their own political motives in promoting communist ideas are made clear, above all, in this defendant's own statement, that in 1940 she broke up with her fiancé because of her communist activities. The political principals of a young girl who does this must have sunk to an especially low level. That she has been carrying out the menial functions has absolutely no bearing on the case. It is not the nature of her activities which determines the court's judgment but the perpetrator's underlying intent."
- "Insbesondere kann bei der Angeklagten Diwisch keinesfalls bloß Beihilfe vorliegen, wie die Verteidigung geltend gemacht hat. Für die kommunistische Einstellung dieser Angeklagten und für ihr eigenes politisches Interesse an der Durchsetzung kommunistischer Ideen spricht vor allem der Umstand, dass sie sich nach ihren eigenen Angaben in der Hauptverhandlung wegen ihrer kommunistischen Tätigkeit im Jahre 1940 mit ihrem Verlobten entzweit hat. Ein junges Mädchen, das das zu Wege bringt, muss seinen politischen Ideen in ganz besonderem Maße verfallen sein. Es spielt dabei gar keine Rolle, dass sie sich zu untergeordneten Funktionen hergegeben hat. Nicht die Art der Tätigkeit ist für die Beurteilung der Tat ausschlaggebend, sondern der Vorsatz, der den Täter bei Ihrer Ausführung begleitet hat."

Senior Public Prosecutor: Justification for the death sentence for Ernestine Diwisch handed down by the special People's Court on 23 September 1943

As a child, between 1932 and 1934 she was a member of the Red Falcons (Rote Falken), a nationwide social-democratic youth organisation with a focus on excursions and camping holidays. The Red Falcons had been set up in 1925 by Anton Tesarek who believed that the teenage children of the proletariat should be encouraged to get plenty of fresh air and to develop a sense of direction for their lives. During 1934 a series of events took place which transformed Austria into a one-party dictatorship which is how the Red Falcons came to be banned that year. War resumed in 1939 and in 1940 Erna Diwisch began to work in her spare time for the (also illegal) Young Communists. She belonged to the "Soldiers Soviet Group" ("Gruppe Soldatenrat") and was involved in the distribution of illegal political reading-matter, including the newspaper "Der Soldatenrat", to soldiers on the frontline. The overall extent and nature of Diwisch's resistance activity is unclear, but it is known that during 1941/42 she took part in the production, funding and distribution of political leaflets as part of the "Fire plate campaign" ("Brandplättchenaktion") organised by the talented chemist and youthful resistance activist Walter Kämpf.

Ernestine Diwisch was arrested on 25 May 1943. On 23 September 1943 she was charged by the chief prosecutor in the special People's Court in Berlin with preparing high treason and favouring the enemy ("Vorbereitung zum Hochverrat und Feindbegünstigung"). The more detailed indictment also included the allegation that she had taken part in meeting with Young Communist members in Vienna. She was one of a number of people tried at the same time. Co-defendants included Alfred Rabofsky, Anna Wala, Sophie Vitek, Ernestine Soucek and Friedrich Muzyka.

On 8 February 1944 the court sentenced Ernestine Diwisch to death and to lifelong dishonour ("Ehrverlust auf Lebensdauer"). Most of her co-accused were also sentenced to death. However, Sophie Vitek's death sentence was subsequently reduced to a fifteen-year jail term (thanks to a personal intervention by her brother with Heinrich Himmler) and Ernestine Soucek ended up with a nine-year jail term. Anna Wala, Ernestine Diwisch and Friedrich Muzyka were executed on 24 May 1944 at the Vienna Regional Criminal Court.

== Celebration ==
The name of Ernestine Diwisch is included on the memorial tablets in the former execution room at the Vienna Regional Court.

In the western-central Rudolfsheim-Fünfhaus district of Vienna the little Ernestine Diwisch Park (Note: Ernestine Diwisch Park 48.18983°N 16.32699°E) was named after her in 2006.
