= Resi Pesendorfer =

Austrian political activist (1902–1989)

- Born: Theresia Laimer; 21 June 1902; Bad Ischl, Upper Austria, Austro-Hungarian Empire
- Died: 31 October 1989
- Occupations: Farm worker Chamber maid Home maker Resistance organiser
- Political party: KPÖ
- Spouse: Ferdinand Pesendorfer
- Children: 1
- Parents: Michael Laimer (father); Barbara Wimmer (1871 - 1912) (mother)

Resi Pesendorfer (born Theresia Laimer: 21 June 1902 - 31 October 1989) was an Austrian political activist, close during the 1920s to the Social Democrats. With the abolition of democracy during 1933/34 she became a resistance activist opposing Austrofascism and after 1938, opposing Pan-German National Socialism. She organised a highly effective network of women in the Salzkammergut region, taking a lead in the concealment of increasing numbers of army deserters and others with political records which made them targets for the security services.

== Life ==
=== Provenance and early years ===
Theresia "Resi" Laimer was born in Bad Ischl, a small town in the mountains east of Salzburg which for centuries had prospered as a centre of salt production. She was one of six siblings. Michael Laimer, her father worked in the salt mines. Her mother, born Barbara Wimmer, died when she was ten. As soon as she left school Theresia took farm work in the area in order to be able to contribute to feeding the family. She later found work with a jeweller's business. Subsequently she was employed for a princess in Schwarzenbach, for whom she worked as a chambermaid. Her father remarried quite soon after the death of his first wife, but Resi Laimer's relationship to her father's second wife was always a "distant" one.

=== Politicisation and marriage ===
Resi Laimer became politically engaged at an early age, supporting the Social Democrats. One source states that she became a member of the Social Democratic movement in 1926, though it remains unclear whether or not she ever became a party member. It was also in 1926 that Theresia Laimer married Ferdinand Pesendorfer. The couple's son was born shortly afterwards. Austria was badly hit by the Great Depression and its economic crisis that followed the 1929 Wall Street crash. A few years after the marriage Ferdinand Pesendorfer, like millions of others, became unemployed. The marriage nevertheless survived till 1942. Meanwhile, Resi Pesendorfer took cleaning and laundry work, but the family were still obliged to forage for berries with sticks in the surrounding woods. As a result of the destitution in which they found themselves, Resi Pesendorfer contracted Pulmonary Tuberculosis, from which she would continue to suffer for twelve years.

=== Austrofascist years ===
The brief and brutally suppressed uprising of February 1934 resonated powerfully in the Salzkammergut region. She was involved locally in the strikes and armed street protests involving the Republican Protection League and the army that were a feature of the period. In 1935 Ferdinand and Resi Pesendorfer both became members of the (by this time illegal) Communist Party.

In 1937 she set up an illegal women's group covering Ischl and the surrounding countryside. The group initially comprised fifteen women. Its purpose was to organise and support opposition to the austrofascist government. A critical responsibility was the organisation of a courier service to sustain contacts between illegal communist groups in Ischl, Goisern, Lauffen and Ebensee. Women were found to be particularly suitable for such courier work because they were far less frequently stopped and questioned than men. Resi Pesendorfer also engaged locally with the Austrian branch of International Red Aid, a workers' welfare organisation widely seen, especially by political opponents, as a front for the Soviet Communist Party.

=== Anschluss Austria ===
The network remained active after the annexation of March 1938, which marked the integration of Austria into an enlarged German state under Hitler. The persecution to which illegal communist cells were subjected by government agencies became more brutish than hitherto. In 1938 Pesendorfer escaped permanent arrest by state authorities in the newly established "Reichsgau Oberdonau" region through what sources term "special political circumstances" ( wegen "besonderer politischer Umstände"). The need for a courier network between the communist and resistance cells in the region became greater than before. Pesendorfer became a focal point for it. Increasingly, over the following few years, it was not just messages that needed to be delivered to secret locations, but also supplies of food, medication, explosives and weapons.

Early in 1941 the first great wave of arrests was launched in the Salzkammergut region. The security services started with the OKA energy company workers in the Gmunden District. Those targeted included Martin Langeder, organiser of the party's youth wing in Goisern, whom they arrested. After that a larger number of men from the resistance movement in Ischl were arrested and imprisoned in Wels and Linz. One of the arrested men was Ferdinand Pesendorfer, Resi Pesendorfer's husband. Others included Alois Straubinger, Josef Filla and Raimund Zimpernik. Resistance activists who had not been located at the time of the arrests were forcibly conscripted for military service during the months that followed, and sent to serve on the Russian front where the tide was beginning to turn against the hitherto unstoppable German war machine. The women's network became more crucial than ever to the very survival of the resistance movement in the Ischl region.

During 1942 two communist members of the resistance movement, Karl Gitzoller und Alois Straubinger, managed to escape from the prisons where they had been taken. Both went into hiding in the Salzkammergut region, where the topography made it relatively easy for those who knew the terrain to avoid capture, but finding hiding places to avoid the worst predations of the Alpine winters presented its own special challenges. Over the next couple of years the number of resistance activists and army deserters hiding out in the mountains steadily increased. The focus of activities for Resi Pesendorfer's network of women shifted. Pesendorfer herself had recently taken work as a cleaner at a holiday villa which was unoccupied. In Autumn 1942 "Villa Waldhütte" became a perfect hiding place for Gitzoller. Discrete deliveries of necessary food, munitions and explosives were also arranged. Resi Pesendorfer herself was briefly arrested by the Gestapo in May 1942. It was impossible to know what the authorities already knew of her illegal activities, either from an unsuspected government spy infiltrated into one of the Communist cells with which she associated or from indiscretions disclosed by an arrested comrade under torture. Nevertheless, arrest was a contingency for which there had been time to plan: she succeeded in telling her interrogators nothing substantive, while consistently denying all allegations put to her. She was released after a relatively brief period of detention, the authorities having determined that they had insufficient evidence to detain her further.

Pesendorfer was not intimidated by her brief detention. She created or cemented contacts between her women's network in the Salzkammergut and resistance groups in the city of Salzburg. These contacts proved critically important in October 1943 when she linked up with Agnes Primocic and other women in the Hallein-based resistance group to help in the escape from the labour camp of Josef "Sepp" Plieseis. Plieseis had been born in Bad Ischl and was already a local hero of the political left on account of his exploits during the Spanish Civil War as a member of the anti-Franco International Brigades. He had been captured in 1941 while making his way home from France. In 1943 he had been sent as part of a forced labour gang from the main concentration camp at Dachau to the subcamp at Bad Vigaun. Agnes Primocic, Mali Ziegleder and other resistance activists smuggled civilian clothes into the camp and helped Plieseis to escape, which following several weeks of meticulous preparation he did on 23 October 1943. With the support of Pesendorfer and her network he was then spirited away to the mountains of the Salzkammergut. Sepp Plieseis, as a local man, already had a detailed knowledge of the region, but he nevertheless had a high-profile as a wanted man. Pesendorfer organised his concealment and enabled him to become a resistance leader in the region by providing the vital courier network which enabled him to sustain effective contact with the resistance groups in the various villages and towns.

=== The Willy-Fred group ===
Sepp Plieseis very quickly emerged as the most important resistance organiser in the Bad Ischl region. His cover name. "Willy" became the synonym by which the regional resistance group was identified. Later he took the precautionary step of changing his cover name to "Fred". Regardless of whether or not this temporarily confused the authorities at the time, it led subsequent generations of historians and commentators to apply the soubriquet "Willy-Fred" to the Salzkammergut activist network. During the first part of 1944 Sepp Plieseis constructed a large but secret hideaway-headquarters in the mountains, adapting for the purpose an otherwise unused salt mine. Salt has been mined in the area for at least five hundred years so there must have been a vast network of tunnels that could provide shelter from the elements and, ample scope for concealment in the event of an unscheduled visit on behalf of the government. Some indication of the size of "Der Igel" ("The Hedgehog"), as the underground hideaway came to be known (as a tribute to a resident family of hedgehogs), comes from reports that Plieseis had satisfied himself that smoke from fires could not be seen from outside the mine before choosing the location for his headquarters. (Today the remains of "Der Igel" have become a popular destination for hikers.)

A particular dangerous activity for members of resistance groups in war-time Austria involved trying to persuade soldiers to desert from the army. It had been found that women were generally more successful at this work than men. Tasks might simply involve leaving a pile of leaflets urging desertion on park benches, in trains, or in other public places. At the other extreme, the work involved identifying depressed looking soldiers home on leave in bars and engaging them in conversation. There were even comrades who wrote letters to soldiers who had returned from leave back to the front line, urging that they desert the German army and find a way to cross over to the opposing Soviet army. After 1943 German victory no longer seemed inevitable and army morale began to crumble. It is impossible to known what effect resistance members had on increasing the desertion rate, but experience in the Salzkammergut suggests that desertions were increasing. Towards the end of 1944 it was estimated that "Der Igel" had become home to approximately 500 men, most of whom had arrived not, in the first instance, to become activist partisan fighters but in order to avoid being found and sent back to their regiments. There were also two more Communist detainees who managed to escape from the subcamp at Bad Vigaun at the end of 1944 and came to Pesendorfer for help. Naturally once the new arrivals had joined the community there was plenty of work to be done, felling trees, both for construction work extending the interior of the salt-caves network and as firewood, along with more directly focused resistance engagement. For the women who lived in the valley below the logistical challenge of keeping so many men supplied with food, weaponry and munitions was formidable. Any villagers found in possession of illegally slaughtered meat faced severe punishment. Resi Pesendorfer later recalled the winter of 1944/45 as her most difficult time during the war. Resi Pesendorfer was among those taking a lead in organising supplies for "Der Igel". Other members of the network known to have been involved in administering this work included Marianne Feldhammer and Leni Egger.

=== After the war ===
Several of Resi Pesendorfer's resistance comrades - all men - wrote about their war-time exploits or gave interviews on the subject after the fighting was over. Resi Pesendorfer did not. She led a relatively inconspicuous life in Bad Ischl, and later in nearby Ebensee. She was nevertheless actively involved in the short-lived "Austrian Concentration Camps Association" ("KZ-Verband") and the "Democratic Women's League". She also continued to participate actively in the political work of the local Communist Party. At the end of the 1970s The President awarded Pesendorfer the Decoration of Honour in recognition of her meritorious contribution to the liberation of Austria.

Her war-time exploits became better known after 1985 when the Viennese filmmaker-writer Ruth Beckermann teamed up with students from the History Workshop Salzburg to produce a 37 minute documentary film about the Resistance in the Salzkammergut. The film, titled "Der Igel" includes interviews with Resi Pesendorfer, Maria Plieseis (the widow of Sepp Plieseis) and Leno Egger. Pesendorfer was 83 at the time of the interview, the film of which is believed to be the only surviving source in which she speaks for herself on the subject.

Resi Pesendorfer died on 31 October 1989 aged 87.
