= Maria Plieseis =

Austrian activist

- Born: Maria Wagner; 15 August 1920; Wolfsegg am Hausruck, Upper Austria, Austria
- Died: 9 January 2004 (aged 83); Sankt Florian, Upper Austria, Austria
- Occupations: Political activist Resistance activist
- Political party: KPÖ
- Spouse(s): 1. Walter Ganhör; 2. Josef "Sepp" Plieseis
- Children: Peter Ganhör

Maria Plieseis (born Maria Wagner: 15 August 1920 – 9 January 2004) was an Austrian anti-government activist in her home region, the Salzkammergut. She married and was widowed in 1941 and joined the Communist Party (which was outlawed at the time) in 1942, and by 1947, despite having ended up in the part of Austria under American military occupation, she emerged as a high-profile Communist activist. She was listed for prosecution as a defendant at the trial which followed the (still controversial) "Bad Ischl Milk Demonstrations", but took temporary refuge in the Soviet occupation zone and thereby avoided US military justice).

== Life ==
=== Provenance and early years ===
Maria Wagner was born at Wolfsegg am Hausruck (Vöcklabruck), a very small market town built around agriculture and lignite mining, in the hill country of Upper Austria, between Salzburg and Linz. She was her parents' only daughter. While she was still very small her father died as a result of injuries sustained during the war and her mother remarried. Her step father already had three children from a previous marriage, so Maria suddenly found herself a member of a four child family. The new arrangements meant Maria suddenly found herself a member of a four child family. The new arrangements also meant relocating to Ried im Innkreis, a slightly more substantial market town some 20 kilometers to the northwest. A further transfer followed, this time to Bad Ischl, further to the south and closer to Salzburg. It was therefore at Ischl, in the Salzkammergut region, that Maria Wagner completed her schooling, after which she spent two years at a technical academy where she studied tailoring and dressmaking.

Democracy had been set aside in Austria since 1934, and by March 1938, when the country was integrated into an expanded Germany under Hitler's leadership, Maria Wagner was a trainee assistant childcare assistant based on the western outskirts of Linz. Over the next couple of years she worked in various jobs, primarily as a nurse and/or care assistant with the Catholic "Liebeswerk" children's welfare organisation in Linz and in Steyr. In or before 1941 she took work as a teacher-instructor at a residential home in Steyr-Gleink for children classified as having learning difficulties. It was here that she met the teacher Walter Ganhör whom shortly afterwards she married. Their son Peter Ganhör was born on 3 August 1941. It was probably shortly before the birth that the couple had relocated back to Bad Ischl, where Maria's mother still lived. However, Walter Ganhör was conscripted for army service and was "killed in action" on 21 October 1941.

=== Communism and resistance ===
It is known that during 1942 the 21 year old widow joined the Communist Party, membership of which had been illegal since 1934. It is not clear whether or how far her active involvement with the party came to the attention of the homeland security services. 1942 was the year in which it began to become apparent that the German army might not, after all, win the war for Hitler. Despite an intensification of political repression on the domestic front, it was also the year during which secret communists, and others began to build an increasingly effective and tightly co-ordinated resistance organisation in the mountains of the Salzkammergut, where more than a thousand years of salt extraction had left a vast network of abandoned salt caves. It was probably towards the end of 1942 that Maria Ganghör became involved with the resistance partisans. Although the fighters were relatively safe from surprise attacks by government agencies in their mountain redoubts, the provision of food, which was severely rationed across the country, and of heating/cooking fuel was a constant challenge. It was found that female comrades walking between mountain villages were less likely to be challenged by officials than men, and accordingly women with good local knowledge of the terrain were generally employed for "courier work" and moving provisions, rather than men. The partisans received an unexpected boost in October 1943 with the arrival in the area of Josef "Sepp" Plieseis, a veteran of the Spanish Civil War who had been identified as a hero by the communists and as a "red Spaniard" by the authorities. He had been captured held him in detention since 1941. In the fall/autumn of 1943 Plieseis was transferred from the Dachau concentration camp to a sub-camp at Vigaun (Hallein). On 23 October 1943, helped by Maria Ganhör and another resistance activist called Agnes Primocic, Sepp Plieseis escaped from the camp and, despite the presence on the camp site of more than 1,500 SS trainees, successfully made his way south into the mountains. During the months that followed, using the code name "Willy", he became the leader of a resistance cell known as the "Willy-Fred group", consisting of a hard core of around 30 volunteer fighters supported, at least during the summer months, by growing numbers of army deserters. Secrecy was vital, and although their contribution was widely celebrated among former partisan fighters after the war ended, many of the details of how the two women helped Sepp Plieseis escape from the camp remain unknown. There are suggestions that their involvement will, at the least, have involved delivering food parcels to camp inmates containing an alternative set of clothes - ideally an SS uniform - which could be used by an escapee. It is known that having escaped and made his way into the mountains, during the winter of 1943/44, Plieseis took shelter in a mountain hut belonging to Maria Huemer, Maria Ganhör's mother (which would normally have been empty in the winter, when the mountain pasture was covered in snow and any surviving livestock would have been kept under cover in the village in the valley). During his time in the hut Maria supplied courier services, which in addition to passing messages would have involved keeping him supplied with vital food and heating fuel.

=== Milk powder ===
In 1947 Maria Ganhör was one of the accused in the aftermath of the "Bad Ischl Milk Demonstrations". The initial street protests arose after authorities determined that the milk ration for children should be replaced with a powdered milk. Food was running short for the Austrian populations, and resentment was intensified by the presence in the area of a number of displaced persons camps. The displaced persons in questions were for the most part Polish refugees who had found themselves homeless when the eastern third of Poland was transferred to the Soviet Union (with the agreement - or, according to some sources, the powerless acquiescence - of the American and British governments). Many of the Polish refugees in the Displaced Persons camps were Jewish. The initial "Milk Demonstrations" were clumsily handled by the American military personnel who were responsible for the administration of this part of Austria between 1945 and 1955, and the numbers of angry Austrians on the streets increased. It was widely believed that the milk ration was being cut because fresh milk was being "siphoned off" (and finding its way on to the black market at inflated prices). The matter took an ugly turn after a mass meeting outside the town hall in Bad Ischl at which the local administrator promised that the fresh milk ration would be restored until a more permanent solution could be found. Instead of dispersing, as the authorities had hoped, the crowd moved on to the nearest displaced persons camp and appeared, to some, to be intent on attacking the inmates. Later there would be allegations that the Austrian police accompanying the marchers had been clearing the traffic with an efficiency that made it look as though they were in support of the demonstration. At the end of the evening the demonstrators were forcibly persuaded to disperse, and the only damage or injury, reported involved one broken window, but there were vigorous complaints, notably from the Jewish community in Linz, and a search for scapegoats. The American administrators received information that the entire affair had been got up by local communists. It is impossible to know how much truth there was in this, but with the mutual cold war suspicions intensifying, the anti-communist narrative was accepted by the authorities. Maria Ganhör's record as a widely celebrated (communist) resistance activist led to her being an obvious suspect, and she was listed for arrest and trial. It is impossible to know if she would have been convicted as she managed to flee to Austria's "Soviet occupation zone" - the area surrounding St. Pölten and Vienna. Maria Ganhör would not set foot in the American occupation zone again until 1955 when, Stalin now having been dead for two years, the Soviet government agreed that the military occupation of Austria might come to an end, opening the way for the Austrian State Treaty, signed on 15 May 1955 and effective from 27 July 1955. The widow Maria Ganhör married Sepp Plieseis in 1956.

=== Later years ===
With foreign military administration a receding memory, Maria Plieseis had returned permanently to Salzkammergut by the end of the decade. Between 1961 and 1970 she worked at the Frey dress factory which the Munich-based multi-national had set up at Bad Ischl in 1950. In June 1969 she took over as chair of the works council at the plant. She moved on again in January 1970, taking a paid job at nearby Gmunden at the regional Party Secretariat.

In 1985 Ruth Beckermann produced a short documentary film about the wartime resistance on the Salzkammergut. She interviewed surviving women who had been part of the resistance group, most prominently Resi Pesendorfer, Leni Egger and Maria Plieseis. Although only 37 minutes long, this film has served to alert younger generations to a period in history that is rapidly receding from living memory. The film, entitled "Der Igel", is an important contemporary testimony to those times. (Note: The film "Der Igl" ("The Hedgehog") takes its name from that given to the mine opening in the high mountains of Salzkammergut, where the partisans made their headquarters in 1943, after Sepp Plieseis had satisfied himself that smoke from their fires could not be seen from outside the mines complex. (Today the remains of "Der Igel" have become a popular destination for hikers.))

During her final years Maria Plieseis was gravely ill. She died aged 82 on 9 January 2004 at Sankt Florian.
