= Hilde Zimmermann =

Hilde Zimmerman
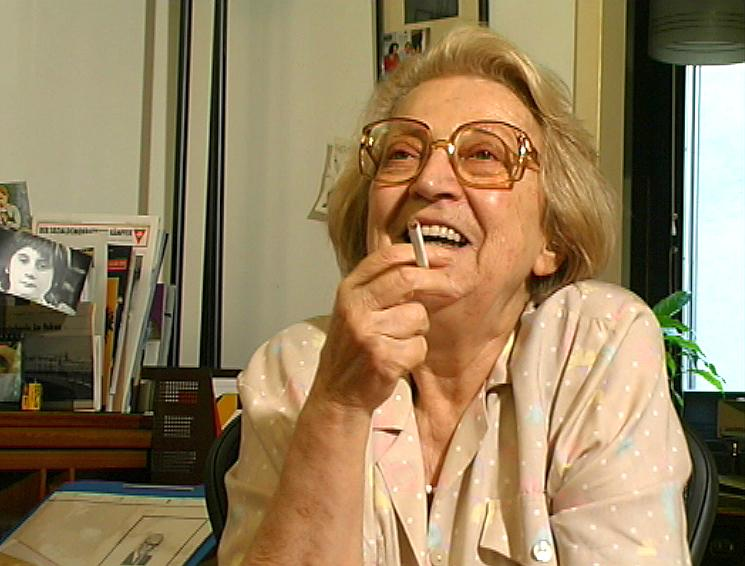
- Zimmermann in 1999
- Born: Hilde Wundsam; September 12, 1920; Vienna, First Austrian Republic
- Died: March 25, 2002 (aged 81); Vienna, Austria
- Parent: Anna Wundsam
- Relatives: Othmar Wundsam (brother)

Hilde Zimmermann (née Wundsam, September 12, 1920 – March 25, 2002), was a member of the Austrian Resistance. Arrested for her efforts to fight fascism, she was deported with her mother and childhood friend by Nazi officials to the Ravensbrück concentration camp in Germany; she then went on to survive both her imprisonment there and a death march.

According to the Österreichische Lagergemeinschaft Ravensbrück & FreundInnen (Austrian Camp Community Ravensbrück & Friends), an organization which she co-founded, "She saw herself as a 'persecuted person', not as a 'victim' and considered it an obligation to report on the Nazis and the concentration camp prison in Ravensbrück especially [to] young people."

== Formative years ==
Born in Vienna, Austria on September 12, 1920, Hilde Wundsam was a daughter of Anna Wundsam. During her formative years, she was raised with her brother, Othmar ("Otti"), in the Kagran section of the city. The city itself was often referred to as "Roten Wien" ("Red Vienna") during this era because the Social Democratic Workers Party of Austria consistently won the majority of elections until 1934 when the Fatherland Front (Austria) took power following the arrest of Mayor Karl Seitz. Her parents were also both arrested that same year. As a result, she and her brother became increasingly involved in anti-fascist activities.

== World War II ==
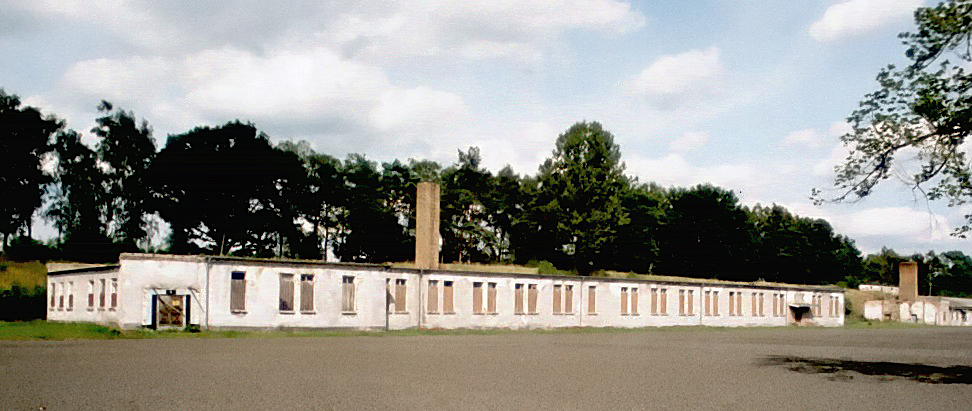
The former women's concentration camp in Ravensbrück, in 2005

Sometime after the Anschluss, Hilde Zimmermann's brother joined the Wehrmacht.

Meanwhile, she became an even more active member of the Austrian Resistance. By 1944, she was involved with a cell which was partnering with Soviet paratroopers who had been sent from Moscow to help expand local anti-Nazi efforts, including hiding and transporting other members of the resistance. That same year, while she and her friend Pauline ("Pauli") Hochmeister were helping to hide Sepp Zettler, a member of the communist resistance, she was betrayed by someone in the community, and arrested, along with her friend and their respective mothers, Anna Wundsam and Gisela Hochmeister. The four were then deported to the Ravensbrück concentration camp. Her brother, Othmar, who had been home on leave from the military, was separated from his family, and sent to the Buchenwald concentration camp.

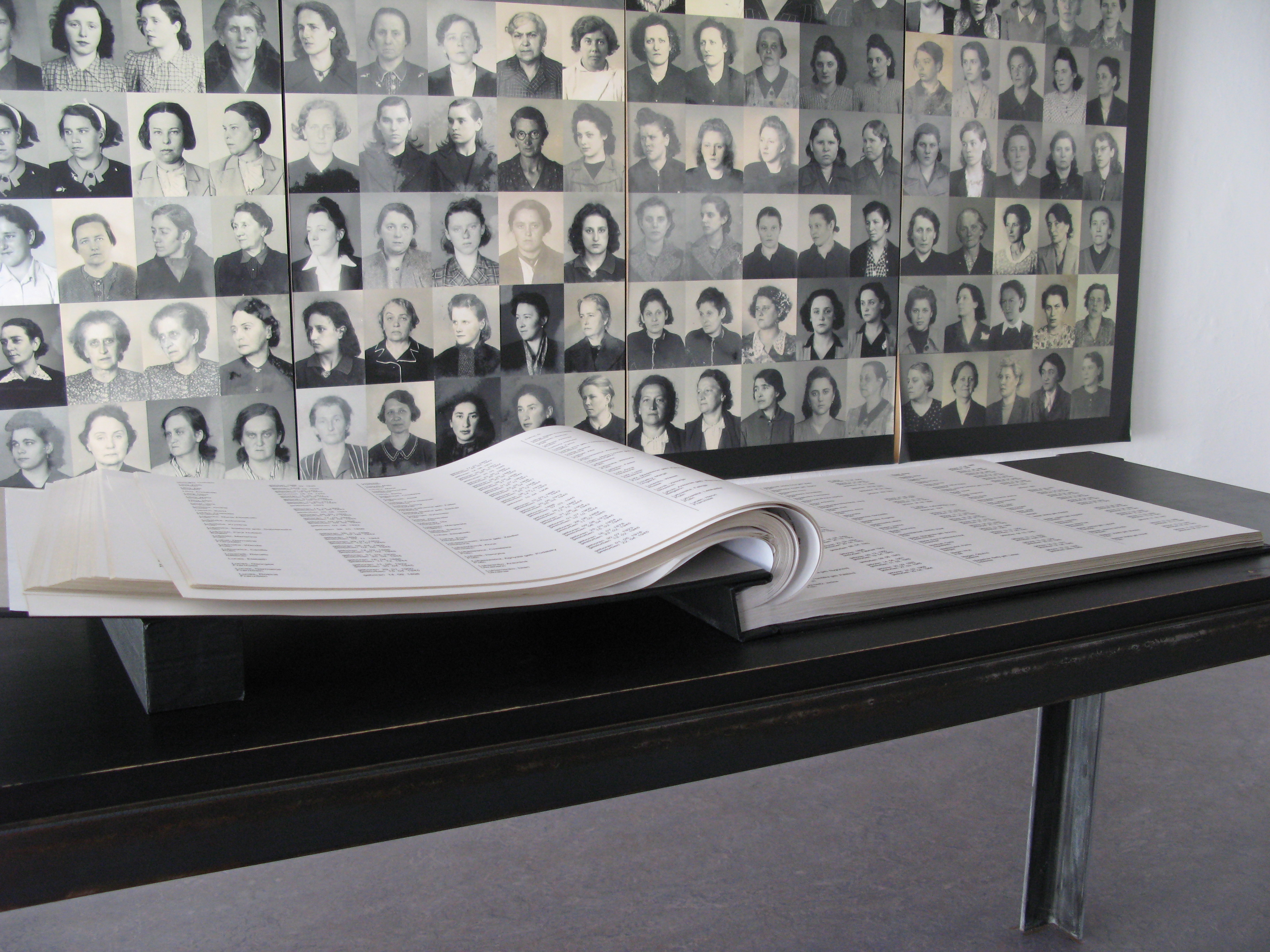
Photos and roster of prisoners, Ravensbrück Memorial

According to historian Elissa Mailänder, when Zimmermann was interviewed later about her experiences, she recalled that "the female guards at Ravensbrück ... used violence as a means of impressing their male colleagues."

She survived her imprisonment at the camp and a death march.

== Post-war life ==
After World War II, Zimmermann worked as a cleaning woman and nanny. She was also a sculptor and eyewear designer.

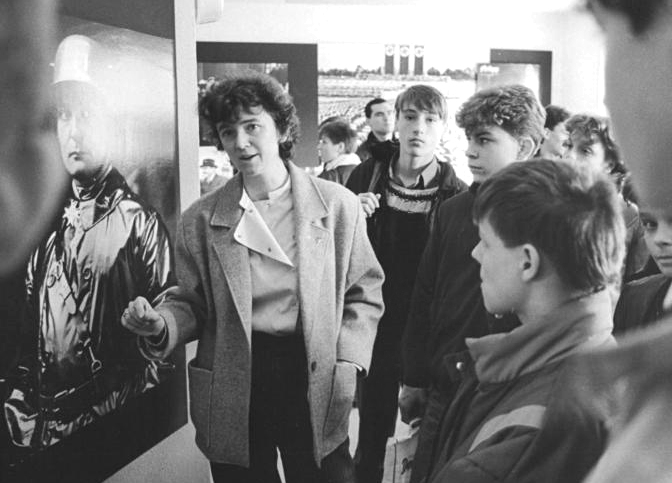
Students touring the Ravensbrück Memorial, 1988

In addition, she co-founded the Österreichische Lagergemeinschaft Ravensbrück & FreundInnen (Austrian Camp Community Ravensbrück & Friends), and spoke regularly to school and community groups about her war-time experiences in order to help youth and adults better understand the economic and social climate which developed in Austria during the 1930s and 1940s.

In 1999, Hilde Zimmermann participated in a lengthy series of interviews with Brigitte Halbmayr for the Ravensbrück Video Archive of the Institute for Conflict Research. The project was entitled, Vom Leben und Überleben–Wege nach Ravensbrück (From Life and Survival-Paths to Ravensbrück). Tina Leisch then led a team of filmmakers in creating a documentary from that interview footage, Dagegen Muss Ich Etwas Tun: Portrait Der Widerstandskämpferin Hilde Zimmermann (I have to do something about that: Portrait of Resistance Fighter Hilde Zimmermann), which was released in 2009.

== Death ==
Hilde Zimmermann died in Vienna on March 25, 2002.

== Literature ==
- Sich die Menschenwürde nicht nehmen lassen. In: Monika Horsky (Hrsg.): Man muss darüber reden. Schüler fragen KZ-Häftlinge. Ephelant-Verlag, Wien 1988 (= Bd. 2 von Dokumente, Berichte, Analysen), ISBN 3-900766-01-0, S. 183–207. (Erlebnisbericht).
- Wie auf Eis gelegt. In: Karin Berger (Hrsg.): Ich geb Dir einen Mantel, dass Du ihn noch in Freiheit tragen kannst. Widerstehen im KZ. Österreichische Frauen erzählen. Promedia Verlag, Wien 1987 (= Edition Spuren), ISBN 3-900478-20-1, S. 17ff.

== Films ==
- Dagegen muss ich etwas tun. Portrait der Widerstandskämpferin Hilde Zimmermann. Germanspeaking Documentation by Tina Leisch, Österreich 2010, 90 Min, Verleih/Vertrieb: Sixpack Film. (Film trailer als Online-Videostream frei verfügbar auf: www.erinnern.at → Dagegen muss ich etwas tun)
