= Anna Wala =

Anna Wala

Anna Wala (21 March 1891 – 24 May 1944) was a Viennese fashion model. Later she became a civil servant, working in a government mail censorship office. She also became an anti-government activist. She was arrested, convicted and sentenced. On 24 May 1944 she was executed by guillotine at the Regional Criminal Court in Vienna.

== Biography ==
Anna Wala was born in Vienna. After leaving school she worked till 1932 as a fashion model, demonstrating clothes for a succession of garment manufacturers. She entered government service in 1940, working in a branch of the censorship office that specialised in foreign mail.

- "She sharply condemned measures and orders by the Nazi government, especially where these concerned sorting out the Jewish question. She openly declared to her work-colleagues that she hated the present war, and that she was as affected by the death of Bolsheviks and Englanders just as much as by the death of German soldiers. She tried to persuade her colleague, Ms Novotny, that the weekly government newsreel report ("Kriegswochenschau") was a fabrication, and asserted that German propaganda consisted of untruths."
- "Sie verurteilte in scharfer Weise Maßnahmen und Anordnungen der nationalsozialistischen Staatsführung, insbesondere soweit diese die Bereinigung der Judenfrage betrafen. Sie erklärte ihren Mitarbeiterinnen gegenüber ganz offen, dass sie diesen Krieg hasse und durch den Tod von Bolschewisten und Engländern ebenso sehr beeindruckt werde wie durch den Tod von deutschen Soldaten. Sie versuchte, ihrer Arbeitskameradin Novotny begreiflich zu machen, dass die deutsche Kriegswochenschau gestellt sei, und behauptete, die deutsche Propaganda sei verlogen."

Senior Public Prosecutor: Indictment against Anna Wala, submitted before the special People's Court on 23 September 1943

She was politically engaged from a young age. She joined the Social Democratic Workers' Party (as it was known at that time) in 1915 and was also a member of the Gewerkschaft der Privatangestellten, a trades union for private sector workers. After the 1932 General Election there was a transition to one-party government and the Social Democratic Workers' Party was crushed. Further dramatic political change arrived in March 1938 when Austrian was invaded. The invasion met with little resistance, and it led to the integration of Austria into an enlarged Nazi German state. Sources are largely silent about Anna Wala's political involvement during the 1930s, but it is known that from 1939 she was involved as an activist with the Young Communists, which had been the focus of increasingly aggressive government repression since 1934. Anna Wala made her apartment in Vienna 9 available for (by definition illegal) political meetings and for the storage of (illegal) literature. She donated money to "Red Aid", a workers' welfare organisation widely seen – especially by political enemies – as a branch of the Communist Party.

In 1942 she joined an opposition group known as the Soldiers' Council Group. The group engaged in the distribution of "illegal [political] literature" and a "Soldiers' Letters" mass-mailing operation, sending letters to soldiers on the frontline urging political opposition and desertion from the army.

Anna Wala was arrested on 25 May 1943. She was charged at the special People's Court in Berlin with "Preparing high treason and supporting the enemy" ("Vorbereitung zum Hochverrat und Feindbegünstigung") on 23 September 1943. Her co-accused were Alfred Rabofsky, Ernestine Diwisch, Sophie Vitek, Ernestine Soucek and Friedrich Muzyka. Anna Wala's charge sheet included the accusation that she had had close relationships with Jews ("... engere Beziehungen zu Juden"). On 8 February 1944 the court sentenced her to death and to lifelong dishonour ("Ehrverlust auf Lebensdauer"). Two of her co-accused were also sentenced to death. Of the other two, Sophie Vitek's death sentence was subsequently reduced to a fifteen year jail term (thanks to a personal intervention by her brother with Heinrich Himmler) and Ernestine Soucek ended up with an eight year jail term.

Anna Wala, Ernestine Diwisch and Friedrich Muzyka were executed on 24 May 1944 at the Vienna Regional Criminal Court, where a guillotine had been installed back in 1934 in the aftermath of the so-called July Putsch.
