= Marianne Feldhammer =

Austrian anti-Nazi resistance fighter (1909–1996)

- Born: Marianne Kalss; 14 March 1909; Altaussee, Styria, Austro-Hungarian Empire
- Died: 15 June 1996 (aged 87); Bad Aussee, Styria, Austria
- Occupations: washer woman resistance activist
- Spouse: Karl Feldhammer (1909–1945)
- Children: Anna Feldhammer

Marianne "Mariandl" Feldhammer (born Marianne Kalss: 14 March 1909 – 15 June 1996) was an Austrian resistance activist during the Nazi years. She was one of the most important women in the (overwhelmingly male) "Willy-Fred" group around Sepp Plieseis. She was the only woman who knew the way to the so-called "Hedgehog" (cave-like hut) used by anti-Nazi partisans, to which by the end of the war she had herself made several deliveries of food and/or messages.

== Life ==
=== Early years ===
Marianne Kalss was born in Altaussee, a small spa town in the extreme northwest of Styria, and a short distance to the east of Salzburg. She attended school locally. Her parents both died while she was a child. She married Karl Feldhammer in 1931. Their daughter Anna was born shortly afterwards. Karl Feldhammer was a skilled carpenter and wood worker who faced long periods of unemployment while his two children were young. He was able to fall back on making wooden shoes, for which the salt mines had an ongoing requirement. Through her husband, who till 1934 was a Social Democrat, Marianne Feldhammer became interested in politics. After the events of 1934 she came into contact with local Communist groups in the Salzkammergut region.

=== After 1938 ===
Shortly after Austria was annexed into an enlarged Germany her husband Karl Feldhammer, who since 1934 had become a Communist party official, was arrested and placed before the district court at Ischl . He was released after fourteen days. He now began to seek out other opponents of National Socialism in Austria to create a resistance group. Through the Bad Ischl shoe maker Hans Rettenbacher they were put into contact with Resi Pesendorfer, later one of the most important women in the Austrian resistance movement.

=== Organising a resistance network ===
A priority at the time was to keep concealed from the authorities people living "underground", by creating a succession of rapidly changing "safe houses" and providing food for which, in the context of the rationing, those who were not registered residents would have no coupons. The women engaged in this activity also took care of information exchange between trusted individuals in the Salzkammergut mountain regions, and operated a messaging service linking Aussee, Goisern, Ischl and Ebensee. Marianne Feldhammer was employed, officially, as a washerwoman who washed the laundry of the better off families in a river channel at Altaussee. There was no facility for a washing clothes in a laundry using chemical cleaning materials in the Aussee district, so she had a perfectly good reason to make weekly visits to the river channel in Altaussee, where she could contact Resi Pesendorfer and resistance supporters there without arousing suspicion.

=== Supplies for the "hedgehog" hideout ===
Pressure on the resistance groups increased from about 1943 as ever larger numbers of army deserters sought refuge in the mountains where they hoped to live "underground" - without a registered domicile, which would make it harder for the authorities to locate them and send them back to the Russian front. It became impossible to find reliable safe houses to accommodate the numbers involved. During the summer months many of the men were able to live out in the open, under the trees, and to sleep in little used or abandoned mountain huts which had been constructed for keeping the hay crop dry until it was needed for the animals. For winter accommodation the communist, Sepp Plieseis, was able to improvise a separate "partisan shelter" for pacifist comrades, using a large cave-like hut higher up in the mountains, carefully sited so that smoke from fires would not be visible from across the valley. The structure came to be known as the "Igel" ("Hedgehog"), out of deference to the family of hedgehogs living on the site when the men started to construct their shelter. Pliesseis had been convicted as a poacher before the war, and was. like many of the local men, able to use his intimate knowledge of the mountains to keep the comrades supplied, although locally available game was not, on its own, a sufficient solution to the challenges arising.

The women in the valley organised supplies for the partisans' secretive supporters, concentrating their efforts on food, but also delivering weapons and ammunition. Marianne Feldhammer was one of those who then deposited these supplies at one of a series of predetermined points, for instance on the inaccessible "Blaa-Alm" mountain. At some stage she became aware of the full route all the way to the "Hedgehog" hideaway, and on three occasions, when the need was urgent, she herself delivered heavy bundles of supplies right to the partisans' mountain shelter. There were also occasions, if the weather was very bad, when men came down to the valley to collect bread or meat or to hand messages to the women for onward transmission to other resistance groups. Marianne Feldhammer was the conduit through which messages were passed for Resi Pesendorfer and the partisan group in the Ischl region. Like Pesendorfer, Feldhammer was on several occasions summoned by the Gestapo for interrogation sessions.

=== Death of Karl Feldhammer ===
Marianne's husband also found himself sought by the Gestapo, and increasingly himself lived "underground". He was arrested in 1944 but managed to escape. At irregular intervals, however, he took his turn to come down from the mountains to collect supplies and to visit his wife and daughter. On 26 January 1945, during one of these visits, the Gestapo appeared at the front door at five in the morning. Karl Feldhammer jumped out of a window at the back of the house in order to escape through the garden, but a Gestapo man shot and killed him using a submachine gun. While the other policeman concentrated on threatening Marianne Feldhammer with his pistol, the couple's twelve year old daughter, Anna, quietly threw the illegal meat supplies that had been intended for delivery to the partisans out of the window where, thanks to the depth of the snow, they remained undiscovered.

The Gestapo failed to obtain direct evidence against Marianne Feldhammer. Sources suggest that the traditionalist assumption - apparently shared by the Gestapo and the resistance partisans in the area - that no woman would ever enjoy significant influence as a resistance activist, served to protect Marianne Feldhammer and her daughter from any more savage level of attention from the authorities. She was accordingly able to ensure, if nothing else, that Karl Feldhammer received a proper funeral.

=== Remembering ===
After the war ended Marianne Feldhammer lived quietly with her daughter as a widow in Aussee. For a generation there was little mention of the important role played by resistance activists in liberating Austria from the Nazis. For many years the traditionalist Catholic establishment in Austria downplayed the role of women in the resistance movement. In addition, in the atmosphere of Cold War confrontation of the period, there was a widespread reluctance in the west to acknowledge the contribution made by people associated with the communists. It was only in the 1980s, notably through the meticulous work of Peter Kammerstätter (who died in 1993) in gathering documents and testimonies of contemporary witnesses, that it became possible for the contribution of activists such as the Feldhammers to be known to the wider public, and to find a way into the mainstream historical record.

In 1985 the film maker Ruth Beckermann produced a documentary about wartime resistance in the Salzkammergut which included interviews with surviving women who had taken part in anti-Nazi resistance. The 37-minute film appeared under the title "Igel" ("Hedgehog"). Parts of it appeared in subsequent television films which were transmitted in Germany and Austria. In 2006 the writer known as Franzobel from Vöcklabruck published "Hirschen" ("Deer"), a stage work on the same theme, which featured Marianne Feldhammer.

Marianne Grab died in 1996. The Altaussee municipality arranged for a "grave of honour" in which her body was placed with the remains of her late husband. Their daughter emigrated and has lived for many years in Ghana.
