= Rosa Hofmann =

Austrian Communist Youth leader (1919–1943)

Rosa Hofmann (27 May 1919 – 9 March 1943) was an Austrian Communist Youth leader who became a resistance activist during the 1930s. In 1943, she was arrested and taken to Berlin where she faced trial, conviction and execution.

== Life ==
=== Family provenance and early years ===
Rosa "Ratzi" Hofmann was born in Wilhering (near Linz) and grew up in the Maxglan quarter of Salzburg. Josef Hoffmann, her father was a Social Democratic trades unionist and a member of the "Schutzbund" paramilitary organisation established during the 1920s to protect the young republic against a surge in political extremism. The children imbibed their socialist beliefs from their parents as they grew up. Josef Hoffmann shot himself in February 1932 after learning that he had been dismissed from the Stiegl brewery where he had been working. He was just 44, and was still suffering badly from the after-effects of wounds sustained in the First World War. Cäcilia, his widow, was left with the four children.

=== Politics ===
After leaving school Rosa's brothers, Josef and Anton, trained respectively as a painter and as a locksmith. The eldest of the four siblings, Therese, worked as a housemaid. Rosa Hofmann became an assistant seamstress, though records indicate that she never went through a formal apprenticeship. While they were children all four had been involved with the Red Falcons, a socialist organisation for young people that arranged expeditions and other free-time group activities. In February 1934 Austria's post-democratic government placed a ban on the hitherto mainstream Social Democratic Workers Party. The Hofmann siblings very soon became involved with the (now illegal) Austrian Revolutionary Socialists which quickly emerged after the ban.

In 1936 Rosa Hofmann began to engage with a socialist youth group at Itzling (Salzburg) which had been set up as an abstinence society in order to disguise its political nature from the authorities. The group organised meetings that featured "political lectures". Other leading participants were Anna Reindl, Maria Langwieser and Emelie Schrempf. Following the integration of Austria into Nazi Germany and the outbreak of another war, during the summer or autumn/fall of 1940, through her friend the carpenter Ernst-Paul Stoiber, Rosa Hofmann came into contact with the (illegal) Young Communists ("Kommunistischen Jugendverbands" / KJV). With Anna Reindl she set up a new "women's cell" in the organisation. In September 1941, after Stoiber had been conscripted into the army, Hofmann, still without a "proper job", took over the leadership of the KJV in Salzburg.

In her new capacity, between September 1941 and April 1942 Rosa Hofmann was in frequent contact with KJV leaders in Linz and Vienna, such as Walter Kämpf, Walter Schopf and Eduard Czamler. She supported the Vienna-based "Soldiers' Soviet group" ("Gruppe Soldatenrat") in a campaign which involved making multiple copies of printed communications addressed to soldiers on the frontline, urging "anti-fascist actions" that included throwing down (literally, "turning round") their rifles. (Note: "... ihre Gewehre umzudrehen ...") She was also involved in distributing these, both to soldiers home on leave in the Salzburg region, and through the public mail system. At her subsequent trial it was asserted that her own apartment in Maxglan (Salzburg) was on three occasion used "as a conspiratorial location" ("... als konspirativer Ort" – for political meetings).

=== Arrest ===
Early in 1942 the Gestapo, with the help of a concealed informer among the various Communist cells under the leadership of Anton Riedl, succeeded in penetrating and breaking up the network. On 16 April 1942 Hoffmann was arrested in Salzburg. The indictment under which she was arrested stated that she had been handing out leaflets at train stations outside military barracks and on trains containing the statement. "We want and end to this bloody and senseless war. We want a fraternal pulling together between the soldiers and the army of red [i.e. communist] workers and peasants in the struggle for a free socialist Europe." (Note: "Wir wollen beizeiten diesem blutigen und sinnlosen Krieg ein Ende setzen und brüderlich vereint mit den Soldaten der Roten Arbeiter- und Bauernarmee in den letzten Kampf ziehen, in den Kampf für ein freies sozialistisches Europa!.") This fell within the general category of "degrading the fighting power of the German people" (Zersetzung der Wehrkraft des deutschen Volkes): it was a serious matter. Following her committal hearing on 9 May 1942 Hofmann was detained in the prison block attached to the Salzburg district court.

=== Indictments ===
The initial indictment was issued by the senior prosecutor (Oberreichsanwalt) of the special "People's Court" on 29 June 1942. It stated that between 1940 and the first part of 1942 Rosa Hoffmann had "continued, both alone and jointly with others, the highly treasonable enterprise, in Salzburg and the surrounding region, to prepare for the forcible change of the [German] constitution and the breaking away of a territory belonging to the [German] state (i.e. Austria)" (Note: "fortgesetzt und gemeinschaftlich mit anderen das hochverräterische Unternehmen, mit Gewalt ein zum Reiche gehöriges Gebiet [Österreich] vom Reiche loszureißen und mit Gewalt die Verfassung des Reiches zu ändern, vorbereitet") . (The reversal of the 1938 incorporation of Austria into Nazi Germany had indeed become a key objective of the Communist Party in particular, and more broadly of many other Austrian anti-fascists.) From this it followed logically that the initial indictment against Hofmann was simply the usual ones for those being arrested in connection with "communist activism" of "preparing to commit high treason" ("Vorbereitung zum Hochverrat") under §80 and §83 in the German penal code of that time.

A longer and more specific indictment produced on 3 October 1942 replaced the relatively standardised original document and indicated that the Gestapo had received good intelligence from their informer and / or other surveillance activities. It identified Hofmann as the leader of the "Salzburg youth group" between September 1941 and April 1942. It referred to her contacts with communist youth group leaders in Vienna and Linz during that time, identifying the individuals involved. It referred to Hofmann's participation in six "inter-regional" party meetings and one that she had held with Anton Reindl himself, and it mentioned the use made of her own apartment on three occasions as a "conspiratorial location". The extended indictment also incorporated further apparently well-sourced operational details. Anton Riedl, the iner-regional leader of communist resistance, never wanted to support sabotage or bomb attacks, but he was enthusiastic in his backing for the leafleting campaigns that originated with resistance activists in Vienna. He even arranged for copies of the Vienna leaflets, with their demands that soldiers should set aside their weapons, to be produced on the spot in Salzburg. To his youthful Salzburg regional leader, Rosa Hofmann, fell the most dangerous part of the action: that meant scattering the "army degradation" ("wehrkraftzersetzend") leaflets along foot paths and on park benches, in telephone kiosks at the Riedenburg barracks, in public toilets at the main railway station and in the railway carriages. During the time that Hofmann was held in pre-trial detention the Gestapo held, in addition, no fewer than nine of the wives of resistance activists from Salzburg and local activist cells in nearby Hallein, Gnigl and Itzling. Those detained included Anton Riedl's wife Anna, who was later transferred from her Salzburg police cell to the Auschwitz concentration camp. The Salzburg resistance circle was effectively wound up with a succession of arrests during the first half of 1942. For most of the detainees the authorities were content to stick with the initial indictment of "preparing to commit high treason". Rosa Hofmann's case stands out from those of her Salzburg comrades on account of the additional charges that were included in the extended second indictment document of October 1942. She was also charged with "treasonably advantaging the enemy" ("landesverräterischer Begünstigung des Feindes") as described in §91 of the penal code and with "degrading the fighting power of the German people" ("Zersetzung der Wehrkraft des deutschen Volkes") which was an offence under §5, para 1 of the special Wartime criminal decree that had come into force in August 1938. Some of the KJV resistance activists from Vienna and Linz were also prosecuted for these offences, probably in connection with the leafleting.

=== Trial ===
- "Dear Mother and Siblings,

Today it is time to take my leave of you since the clemency application has been rejected. But, dear Mother, I am quite calm.
I thank you, darling Mother, for your love, and I stand so deeply indebted to you on account of the grief which now I am preparing for you.... If you were able to see just how calm I am, then your grief for me would be lessened. Keep me always in your loving thoughts: so many are dying these days without knowing what it is for, you must tell yourself. Who knows what else would have been left for me, since youth is behind you when you have gone through what I have gone through. I feel like an old woman, and would never again be able to know happiness, so believe me, it is good this way. I have become so tired over time.
So, darling Mother, stay healthy – and Resi and Toni too, you should be happy again and make Mother's life beautiful. I send you all my last kisses and a hot hug, with a thousand greetings."

- "Liebe Mutter und Geschwister!

Heute heißt es Abschied nehmen von Euch, denn das Gnadengesuch ist abgelehnt worden. :Aber ich bin ganz ruhig, liebe Mutter. :Ich danke Dir, liebes Mütterlein, für Deine Liebe, und ich stehe so tief in Deiner Schuld wegen dem Kummer, den ich Dir jetzt bereite. […] Wenn Du sehen würdest, wie ruhig ich bin, dann würde auch Dein Kummer nicht so groß sein um mich. Behalte mich immer im lieben Andenken, es sterben jetzt so viele und wissen nicht wofür, musst Du Dir sagen. […] Wer weiß, was ich noch alles mitmachen müsste, denn die Jugend ist vorbei, wenn man das erlebt, was ich erlebt habe. Ich komme mir vor wie eine alte Frau und würde nie mehr genauso glücklich sein können, es ist gut so, wie es ist, glaube mir. Ich bin müde geworden in der Zeit.
Also, liebes Mutterle, bleib gesund, und auch die Resi und der Toni, werdet noch recht glücklich, und macht der Mutter das Leben schön. Meine letzten Busserln und eine heiße Umarmung schick ich Euch mit tausend Grüßen. Eure Ratzi"

In the end Rosa Hofmann was taken to Berlin for trial by the special "People's Court" that had been established in 1934 in response to government dissatisfaction with decisions handed out by the existing court system, notably in respect of political cases. Hofmann's tial took place before the court's "sixth senate" on 15 December 1942 just as the government's military ambitions – along with the lives of thousands of military conscripts – were being crushed in and around Stalingrad. Her brother Josef had been kiiled on the Russian front two months earlier'. The presiding judge was Walter Hartmann (1887–1945). Rosa Hofmann was found guilty of undermining the war effort and advantaging the enemy. (Note: "Zersetzung der Wehrkraft des deutschen Volkes in Verbindung mit landesverräterischer Begünstigung des Feindes und Vorbereitung zum Hochverrat") She was sentenced to death and life-long deprivation of citizen's rights. The court gave as justification for the death sentence its finding that the accused had participated in the distribution of certain documents intended to degrade the German army. (Note: "in ihrer Beteiligung an der Verbreitung der zur Zersetzung der Deutschen Wehrmacht bestimmten Schriften") It is certainly the case that Rosa Hofmann acknowledged her resistance actions before the court. But she also insisted that certain formulaic statements in the Gestapo evidence, that she had acted as "a fanatical communist" and "hoped for social betterment from the world revolution" did not correspond with anything she had or would have said.

=== Death ===
A clemency plea was submitted on her behalf but rejected. On 17 March 1943 Rosa Hoffmann's execution at the Plötzensee Jail in Berlin was reported in the pro-party Salzburger Zeitung (newspaper) under the headline "Enemy of the state executed" ("Staatsfeindin hingerichtet"). It had taken place eight days earlier. At least 79 activist members of communist and socialist resistance groups from in and around Salzburg died in concentration camps or jails during the National Socialist period.

In 1968 Cilli Hoffmann, Rosa's widowed mother, died at the age of 81 in Salzburg.

== Celebration ==
In Salzburg, Rosa Hoffmann is commemorated by a plaque on the building in which she lived, a memorial in the nearby "Stölzlpark" (park), a "Stolperstein", a library and a street name.

In May 2015, as the country celebrated the 70th anniversary of liberation from National Socialism, the Salzburg branch of the KZ-Verband (dedicated to commemoration of the Austrian resistance), applied for the memorial to Rosa Hofmann in the "Stölzlpark" to be repositioned, since it had ended up fenced off inside a playground attached to a Kindergarten, which meant it could no longer be freely accessed by members of the public. The application evolved into an initiative for a redesign of the memorial and the inclusion on it of the names of seven of Rosa Hofmann's resistance comrades who had been shipped to Auschwitz without trial in 1942 and then murdered. Their names are Rosa Bermoser, Maria Bumberger, Anna Frauneder, Marianne Innerberger, Anna Prehauser, Anna Reindl and Josefine Lindorfer. The proposal that the new expanded memorial should be commissioned from the artist Iris Andraschek was unanimously agreed by the responsible Culture Committee on 13 December 2018.
