= Marie Schönfeld =

Austrian government worker and anti-Nazi resistance activist (1898–1944)

Marie Schönfeld (13 July 1898 – 19 September 1944) was an Austrian government worker ("Regierungsassistentin") who became an anti-Nazi resistance activist.

She and her brother were members of a small but committed movement that favoured a Habsburg restoration.

She was captured, sentenced, and beheaded at the Vienna district court.

== Life ==
Marie Karoline Schönfeld was born in Vienna. She and her elder brother Franz came from a family in the cty's Währing district, with a long tradition of government service and Catholic conservatism. After her years of compulsory schooling Marie transferred to a "Commercial School" ("Handelsschule"). However, on completing her time there she entered not the private sector but government service, joining the Ministry of Public Works in 1917.

The Schönfeld siblings were legitimists: they backed the restoration of the Austria-Hungarian monarchy under Crown Prince Otto von Hapsburg as Emperor of Austria. Franz Schönfeld joined the Social Democratic Party in 1919 and Marie Schönfeld at some stage became a member of the Christian Trade Union Federation. In 1934, they reportedly joined the "People's Party" ("Volkspartei"), but at their later trial they both described themselves as non-political. (By this time, as the government drew inspiration from events in Germany, Austria was rapidly becoming a one-party state.) Regardless of their political loyalties in 1938, the Schönfelds saw the annexation of Austria by Nazi Germany, which took place in March 1938, as a national humiliation.

Following a promotion, in 1938 Marie Schönfeld began working as a typist in a department of the government's Property Transaction Office. Around this time the Schönfelds started to campaign more actively against the evolving political status quo. Their activity involved producing, copying and distributing political leaflets. Between May 1942 and their arrest in May 1943, court records indicate that together they produced "false and highly treasonable written messages" which they distributed on street corners and in post offices. They also sent their messages on post cards to various Nazi Party buildings and police stations. The most memorable of their treasonable anti-Nazi leaflets appeared in 1942 and consisted of a parody of four lines from the German national anthem:

- "Germany, Germany must disappear from the world,

we hope it will soon collapse into rubble ...
German terror, German arrogance, German pressure and German force
should never torment us, for the rest of our lives

- "Deutschland, Deutschland muss verschwinden von der Welt,

hoffen wir, dass es in Bälde jammervoll in Trümmer fällt. [...]
Deutscher Terror, deutsche Frechheit, deutscher Druck und deutscher Zwang,
niemals sollen sie uns quälen, unser ganzes Leben lang."

Another message, which they sent to the party Gauleitung (regional leadership) in Vienna, included the threat that "in our stolen Austrian land we will slit open your stomachs which you have gorged to fill at our expense. We will rip out your guts and use them as wreaths to hang on the pictures of Hitler".

The leaflets were designed by Franz, but Marie helped with copying and distribution. In total Gestapo submissions indicate knowledge of around 65 different texts.

== Trial, sentencing and execution ==
On 15 July 1944 Marie and Franz Schönfeld faced the special "Peoples' Court" in Vienna. The charge was the usual one of "preparing to commit high treason and supporting the enemies [of the state]" ("Vorbereitung zum Hochverrat und Feindbegünstigung").

The court determined:

- The siblings Franz and Marie Schönfeld, together, have during 1942/43, produced and distributed in Vienna numerous pamphlets that are hostile to the state and exceptionally vulgar in nature, and they are therefore condemned to death and deprivation of status for preparing Habsburg separatist high treason .... There is no room for people like that in the German peoples' community. They have brought eternal dishonour on themselves ... and must be exterminated.
- Die Geschwister Franz und Marie Schönfeld haben gemeinschaftlich in Wien in den Jahren 1942/43 zahlreiche staatsfeindliche Flugschriften übelsten Inhalts hergestellt und verbreitet und werden deshalb wegen Vorbereitung des habsburgisch-separatistischen Hochverrats und Feindbegünstigung zum Tode und zum Ehrverlust auf Lebenszeit verurteilt. [...] Für solche Menschen ist kein Platz in der deutschen Volksgemeinschaft. Sie haben sich für immer ehrlos gemacht [...] und müssen aus ihr ausgemerzt werden.

The Schönfeld siblings died on the guillotine on 19 September 1944 at the Vienna district court.
