= Austrian Democratic Union =

Political organization

The Austrian Democratic Union (German: Österreichische Demokratische Union) was a grouping formed by Austrian exiles in Britain in August 1941 during the Second World War. It was based at the Austrian Office or Austrian Centre and consisted of Social Democrats and Liberals - alongside the mainly Austrian monarchists of the Austrian League (signatories of the Austrian Society declaration) who made up the dominant group in the 30,000 strong exile community in wartime Britain. By 1944, the ADU had attracted around 300 members, primarily intellectuals, bankers, businessmen and lawyers. The British government unofficially favoured the monarchists.

== See also ==
- Anschluss
- Moscow Declaration (including the "Declaration regarding Austria") of 30 October 1943.
- Austrian resistance
