= Ektor Tsironikos =

Greek collaborationist

Ektor Tsironikos (Greek: Έκτωρ Τσιρονίκος; Arachova, Iraia, Arkadia, 1882 – 1964) was a Greek businessman and a collaborationist minister in certain German-appointed Greek governments during the Axis occupation of Greece.

After the German withdrawal of Greece in October 1944, Tsironikos headed a collaborationist regime in exile, the so-called 'Greek National Committee', together with other prominent Greek collaborators. In 1945, Tsironikos was sentenced to death in absentia. In 1947, he was arrested by the Americans and extradited to Greece, where he remained in prison until being pardoned in 1952. Tsironikos died in 1964 in the Nursing Home of Athens.
