= Johann Gruber =

Austrian Roman Catholic priest

Johann Gruber

Johann Gruber (October 20, 1889 – April 7, 1944), also known as "Papa Gruber" and "The Saint of Gusen", was an Austrian Roman Catholic priest who was imprisoned in Concentration Camp Gusen I from 1940 until he was murdered by the camp commandant on Holy Friday 1944. In the concentration camp, Gruber helped many others survive by raising funds from outside the camp and bribing the SS men and kapos in order to organise the delivery of food to starving inmates.

== Education ==
Johann Gruber was born in Tegernbach near Grieskirchen, Austria. When his parents died, he became a pupil at the Petrinum Linz, a catholic private school where he received his Matura. In 1910, he joined the seminary in Linz. Following his ordination he served for several years as a priest until he began to study philosophy in Vienna. He finished his studies with a PhD in 1923 and became a teacher and director of an institution for the Blind in Linz.

== Captivity ==
In 1938, after the Annexation of Austria into the German Reich, Gruber was arrested for expressing his opposition against the new national socialist regime. While he was imprisoned, the Nazi press started a smear campaign against him, claiming that he sexually abused his pupils. Witnesses were put under pressure to confirm the allegations and Gruber was convicted to spend two years in prison.

When Gruber was released from prison, he was sent to Dachau concentration camp and then to Gusen concentration camp. In Gusen he participated in an archaeological project outside the camp and succeeded in contacting his friends who sent him money. This enabled Gruber to forward messages and to support his fellow prisoners with food and medication. His activities were discovered by the camp commander on April 4, 1944. Gruber was interrogated and tortured for three days. The guards hanged his corpse on a tree nearby and the cause of his death was officially declared suicide.

In 2016 the criminal court in Vienna reversed Grubers conviction concerning sexual abuse.
