= Karl Biedermann =

German officer

Karl Biedermann (11 August 1890 – 8 April 1945) was the commander of the Austrian Heimwehr, a major in the Wehrmacht and a member of German resistance to Nazism.

== Life ==
Biedermann was born in Miskolc, Austria-Hungary. After visiting the cadet corps in Traiskirchen, Karl Biedermann served from 1910 in the Common Army. In World War I, he served as an officer. He was released from Bundesheer (1. Republic) in 1920 with the rank of captain. His civil profession was official of the "Österreichische Postsparkasse" (Austrian post savings bank). In February 1934 Biedermann was commander of a company of the "Freiwilligen Schutzkorps", consisting of units of Heimwehr and helping troops of the Bundesheer. In this function, he participated in the Austrian Civil War at the conquest of Vienna Karl-Marx-Hof. Biedermann was also an illegal member of the Nazi Party.

After the Anschluss to Nazi Germany in March 1938, Biedermann joined the Wehrmacht. In 1940, he was promoted to major. During World War II he participated in the Battle of France, the Balkan Campaign and the Eastern front.

Biedermann joined the resistance group of Austrian Wehrmacht people led by Major Carl Szokoll. In spring 1945, this group planned "Operation Radetzky", to support Red Army in the liberation of Vienna and to prevent further destruction, to avoid the blowup of bridges.

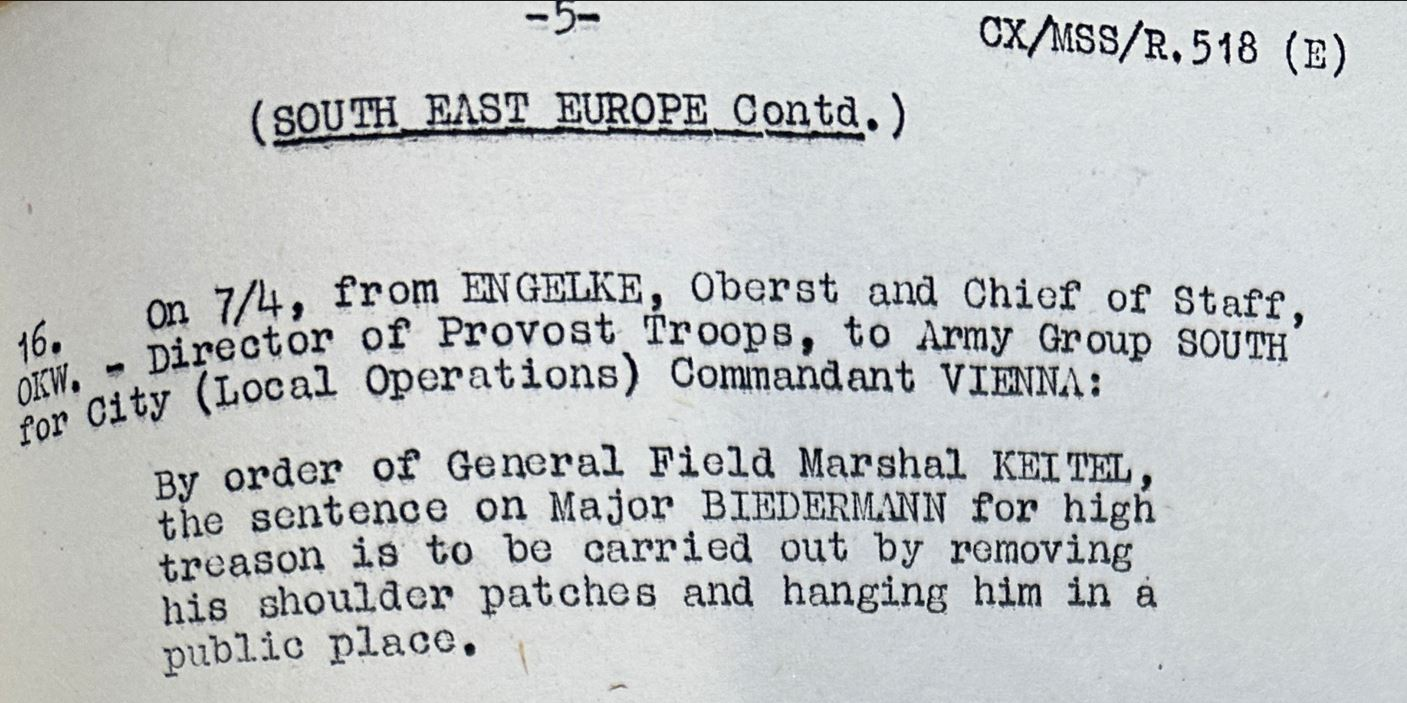
Document on major Biedermann

However, "Operation Radetzky", planned for 6 April 1945, was discovered. Biedermann was arrested the night from 5 to 6 April 1945 and brought to a drumhead court-martial and sentenced to death. On 8 April 1945 Biedermann was hanged together with two other resistance fighters, captain Alfred Huth and Rudolf Raschke in public at Floridsdorfer Spitz in Vienna. The chief of "Sicheitspolizei and SD", Rudolf Mildner personally took command at the hanging place.

Biedermann was buried 2 August 1945 in Vienna on Hietzingen cemetery in an honorable grave (group 66, row 19, number 5). In the same grave were buried also Alfred Huth and Rudolf Raschke.

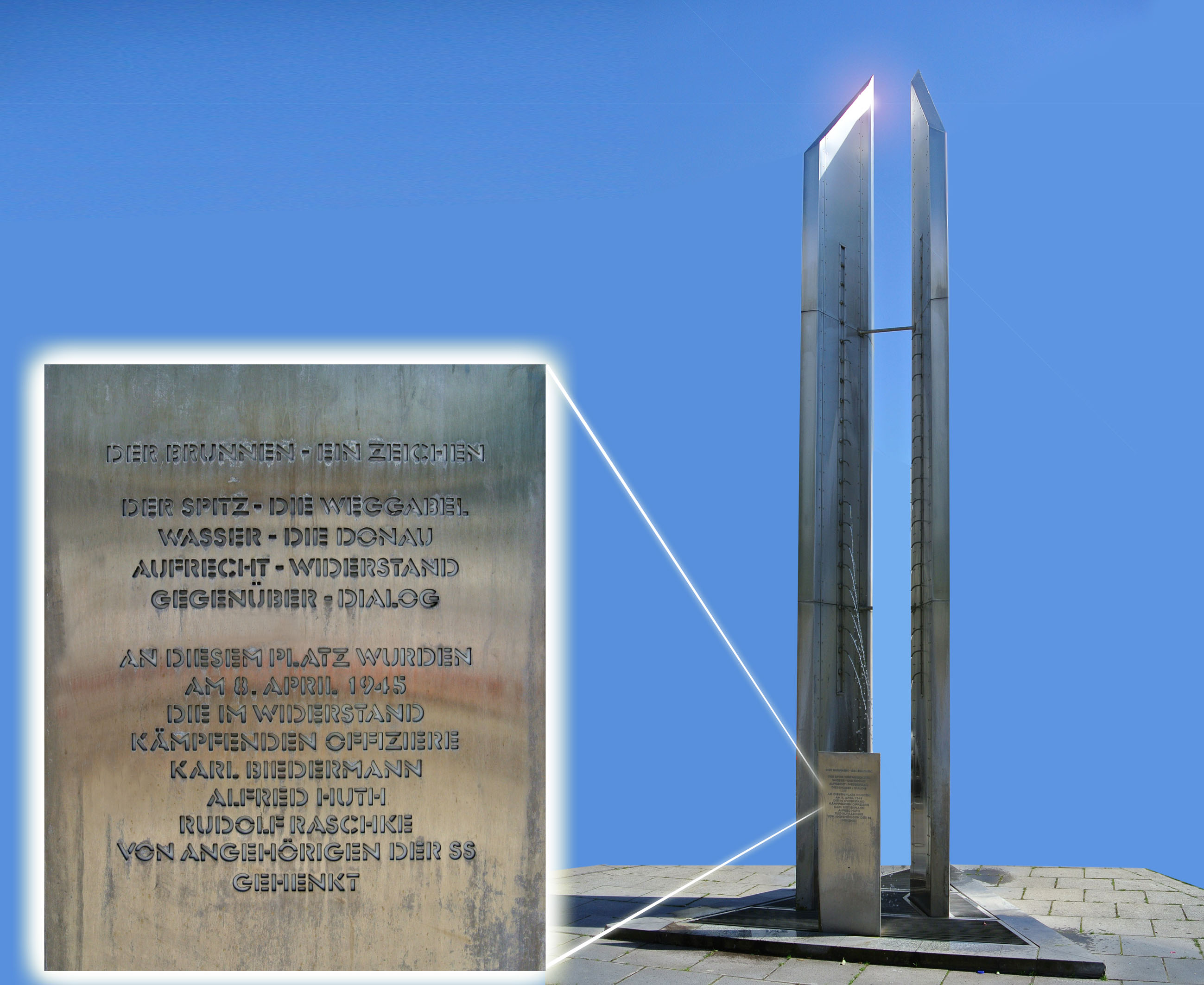
Memorial in Wien-Floridsdorf

In 1995, in Wien-Floridsdorf, the Karl-Biedermann-Gasse was named after him (Karl-Biedermann-Alley).

== Literature ==
- Carl Szokoll: Die Rettung Wiens 1945. Mein Leben, mein Anteil an der Verschwörung gegen Hitler und an der Befreiung Österreichs. Amalthea-Verlag, Wien 2001 ISBN 3-85002-472-5.
- Michael Krassnitzer: Widerstand in Hietzing. Freiheitskampf 1934–1938 und 1938–1945 am Beispiel eines Wiener Bezirks. Edition Volkshochschule, Wien 2004, ISBN 3-900799-58-X.
