= Rudolf Heinrich Daumann =

German journalist and writer

Rudolf H. Daumann (1896–1957) was a German teacher, journalist, and writer. He was best known for writing science fiction and historical fiction novels, such as Gefahr aus dem Weltall (Danger from Space) in 1938 and Der Untergang der Dakota (The Downfall of the Dakota) in 1958.

== Early life ==
Rudolf H. Daumann was born on November 2, 1896 in Groß-Gohlau, Lower Silesia, German Empire (now Gałów, Poland). He was born into a middle-class Silesian farming family and was raised on a farm.

== Career ==
Originally working as a primary school teacher, he was drafted into World War I. After the war resolved, he spent his time suffering major wounds from his battles.

hen World War II began, he fled to Austria to join an illegal Anti-communist group. He worked as a foreign correspondent for German newspapers, traveling all throughout the world.

He made his novelist debut with his first novel, Der Streik (The Strike), published in 1932. The book had themes of utopia and injustice between the Silesian groups. Because of his left-wing views and the themes of his book, the Nazi government fired him from his job, ending his work in journalism. To survive financially, he kept publishing commercial science fiction novels and historical fiction depicting themes of utopia. These novels were published between the 1930s and 1940s.

After the fall of the Nazi rule, he decided to move to the socialist side and settle in the Soviet zone. He got a job as a broadcasting director during his time there, and also published books in the 1950s more geared towards children.

== Private life ==
Daumann was secretly with the Communist Party, and was deeply opposed to the Nazi regime.
