= Walter Kämpf =

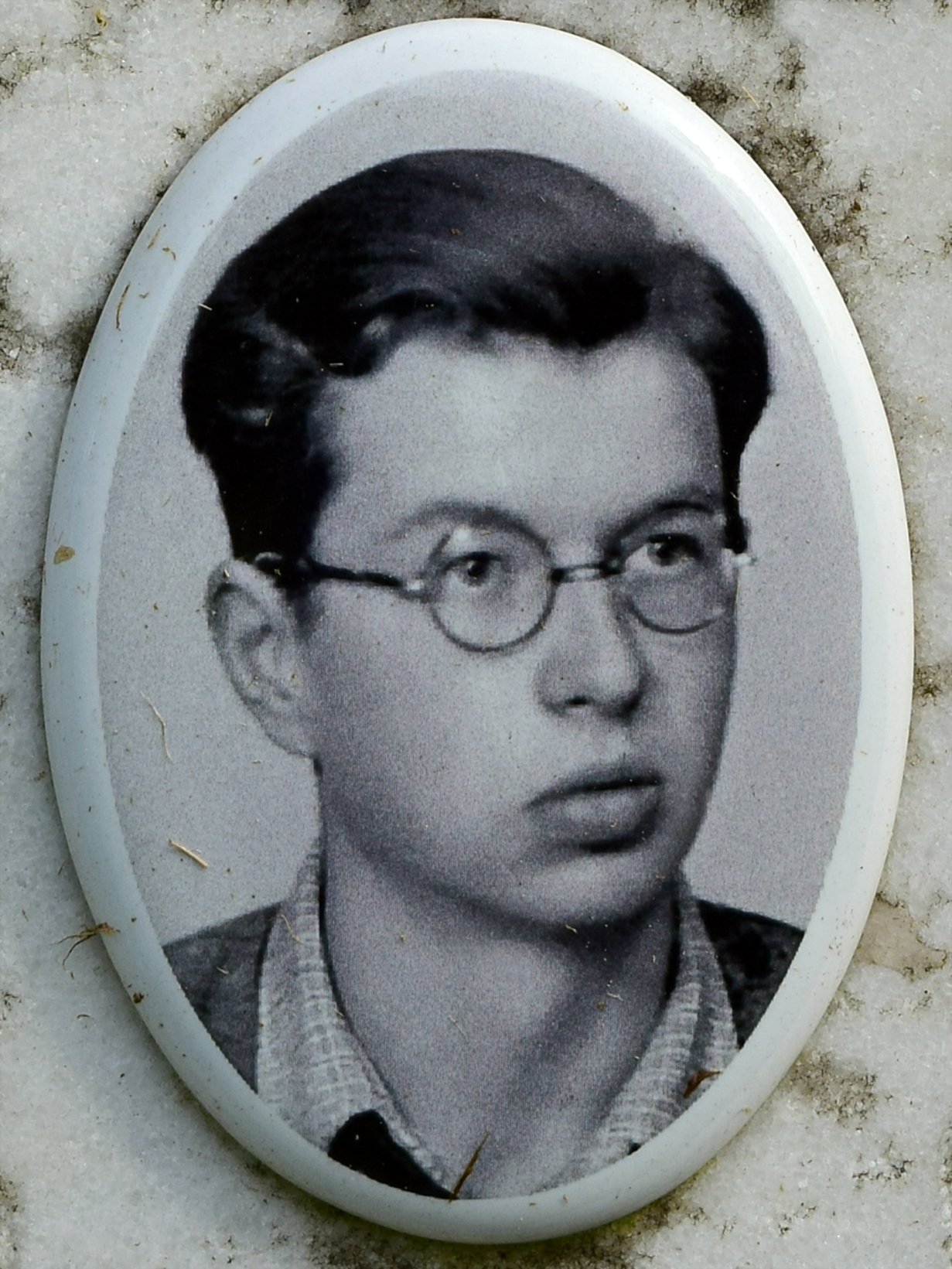

Walter Kämpf (12 September 1920 – 2 November 1943) was an Austrian anti-Nazi activist. He became a resistance member when he was still at school in Vienna. Following his conscription in 1939 he was also a soldier. He was subsequently suspected of "spying" and convicted by a military court. His death sentence was carried out using the guillotine that had been installed at the Vienna Regional Court complex, soon after the incorporation of Austria into an expanding German state.

== Life ==
Kämpf was born in Vienna. He attended the Döblinger Gymnasium (secondary school) on the north side of the city, but left early in order to progress to the Höhere Bundeslehr- und Versuchsanstalt für chemische Industrie, a prestigious vocational college which had been established during the early years of the twentieth century to train students for graduate-level careers in the important chemicals industry. He was excluded from the college in 1936, however, for "kommunistischer Betätigung" ("Communist activity"). The circumstances under which he was readmitted are unclear, but he graduated after completion of his "fourth year" in 1938/39, receiving exceptionally high marks.

In March 1938 the country was invaded and became part of Nazi Germany, which had been a one-party dictatorship since 1933. Kämpf and his friends reacted by creating the Young Communist "Soldiers' Soviet" ("Soldatenrat") group. The term "Soldatenrat" is also sometimes translated into English-language sources as Soldiers' Council: it references the workers' and soldiers' soviets/councils which emerged across much of central Europe, including Austria and Germany, in the chaotic immediate aftermath of the First World War. Other group members included Elfriede Hartmann, Friedrich Mastny and Franz Reingruber. Activities principally involved producing illegal news sheets and leaflets. As a result of Kämpf's training in chemistry the group were also able to produce so-called "Brandplättchen" (loosely, "fire plates"), which might be used for future sabotage actions.

War returned in September 1939 and Kämpf was conscripted into the wartime army. Bizarrely, Nazi Germany was now unexpectedly on the same side as the Soviet Union which invaded Poland from the east sixteen days after the German invasion from the west (which according to mainstream anglophone historiography triggered the war). For many of those, such as Kämpf, who retained an active commitment to the illegal Communist Party, it was hardly possible to oppose unhesitatingly the alliances entered into by Stalin and the comrades in Moscow. Kämpf's attitude to the Stalin-Hitler alliance is unclear, but any unease would have been resolved when the Germans changed sides and, in June 1941, invaded the Soviet Union. A month later, in July 1941, Kämpf switched to work as a paramedic, assigned to a military hospital for Luftwaffe casualties. His role was still essentially, a military one, however: by the time of his arrest he would have reached the rank of "Luftwaffenobergefreiter" (loosely, "flight sergeant").

It is evident that conscription in 1939 did not mark an end to Kämpf's secret double-life as a resistance activist. Membership of the army indeed presented new opportunities to infiltrate ideas into the Hitler Youth. Some fellow conscripts received anti-Nazi letters from the activists, while communist news-sheets such as "Soldatenrat" and "Die Rote Jugend" were left in quiet corners where they might be casually found and, it was hoped, read by young soldiers trying to make sense of rapidly developing events. After the outbreak of war, Kämpf teamed up with a fellow conscript called Friedrich Mastny. Mastny had also been a leader in the Vienna Young Communists. Now they worked together on the production of anti-government news sheets.

The authorities became increasingly concerned by the impact on morale of anti-government activists in the army, and the resistance group to which Kämpf and Mastny belonged was infiltrated by Gestapo informers. Later, Kämpf would smuggle out warnings to those comrades who remained at liberty, identifying four "snitches" named Herta, Olga, Gretl and Sonja, who lived in north-west Vienna in a house owned by a man called Glaser or Gläser along the Selzergasse. One of the girls had become the girl friend of Glaser or Gläser, and between them they betrayed many members of the resistance group to the authorities, along with various friends and contacts. Kämpf was arrested on 27 April 1942: Friedrich Mastny just over a couple of weeks later on 13 May 1942.

Kämpf was able to smuggle out (at least) one "report" to comrades from prison, in which he warned his comrades against Gestapo spies whom he identified and who had infiltrated the group. He was also able to report the interrogation to which he had been subjected, some of it under torture. On 17 February 1943 the special People's Court delivered its verdict. In the main trial, he had taken the opportunity to declare that he saw it as his duty to help put an end to the war against the Soviet Union as soon as possible. He had become convinced that Germany would never succeed in a war against Bolshevism. The defendant was an uncommonly dangerous enemy of the state. For the present and future welfare and safety of the people and of the state, his eradication was imperative.

Kämpf was executed on 2 November 1943 at the Vienna Regional Court complex. His friend and comrade Friedrich Mastny was executed later the same day.
