= Josef Plieseis =

Austrian anti-Nazi resistance fighter (1913–1966)

- Born: December 20, 1913; Bad Ischl, Austria-Hungary
- Died: October 21, 1966 (aged 52); Bad Ischl, Austria
- Resting place: Bad Ischl Friedhof
- Political party: Communist Party of Austria
- Spouse: Maria Wagner
- Military Service
- Allegiance: Second Spanish Republic
- Branch: Spanish Republican Army
- Unit: International Brigades
- Conflicts: Spanish Civil War

Josef "Sepp" Plieseis (20 December 1913 – 21 October 1966) was an Austrian resistance fighter against the Nazi regime.

== Biography ==
Plieseis was born in Bad Ischl and became a young member of the Socialist movement. He joined the Kinderfreunde Österreich, an organization for children and their families close to the Social Democratic Party of Austria (SPÖ), then joined the Socialist Workers' Youth (Sozialistische Arbeiter-Jugend). After the Austrian Civil War of 1934, in which Plieseis took part in Ebensee alongside members of the Republikanischer Schutzbund, he broke away from Austrian social democracy and joined the Communist Party of Austria (KPÖ).

He volunteered to fight in the Spanish Civil War as a member of the International Brigades, where he was wounded twice. After the defeat of the Republican forces, he fled to France where was arrested and incarcerated in concentration camps in Gurs, St. Cyprienne, und Argiles before returning to his home in Salzkammergut. He was arrested at the border by the Nazi authorities. Because of his refusal of conscription in the Wehrmacht he was again arrested and sent to Linz, then Dachau, and finally to Dachau's annex in Hallein.

He managed to escape from this camp and hid in the forests and mountains of his native area. Although an SS training camp was located in the same place, bringing together 1500 to 2000 men, he managed, with the help of female agricultural workers, to flee through the mountains on October 23, 1943 and to hide in the upper Salzkammergut. It was there that he organized a resistance group against National Socialism whose priority objective was to hide deserters from the region in the mountains.

With the arrival of American troops in the region in May 1945, the group stopped their activities and Sepp Plieseis became advisor to the Americans on security issues in Bad Ischl and its surroundings and served as a municipal official.

After the war, he served in various political appointments in his home area and remained a member of the Communist Party of Austria.

He was married to Maria Wagner, who was also a resistance fighter.

Sepp Plieseis wrote and published his memoirs me with the help of Rudolf H. Daumann. After his death in 1966, he was buried at the Bad Ischl Friedhof.
