= George William, Hereditary Prince of Hanover =

German prince (1880–1912)

George William
- Hereditary Prince of Hanover
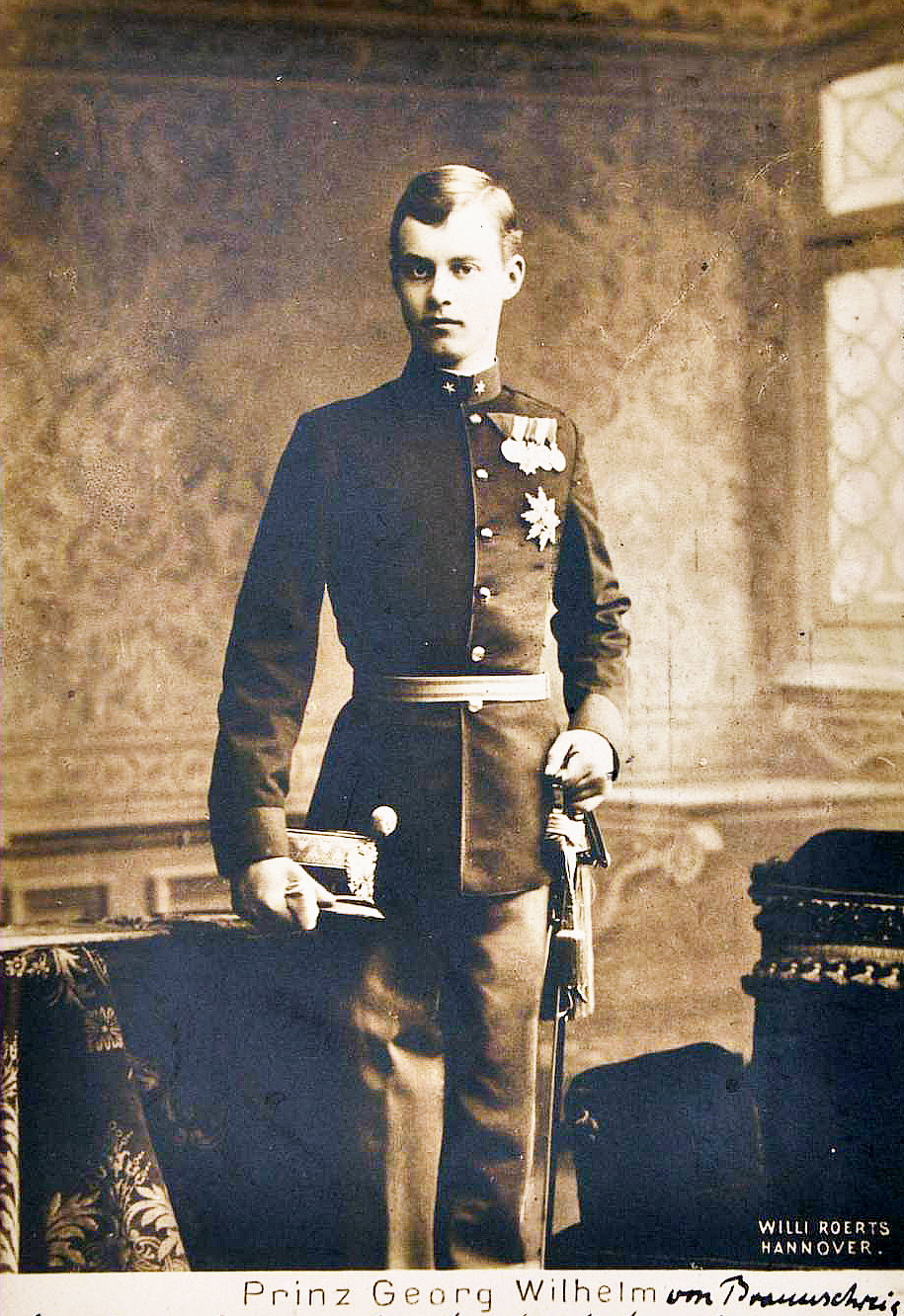
- George William in 1900
- Born: 28 October 1880; Gmunden, Austria-Hungary
- Died: 20 May 1912 (aged 31); Nackel, German Empire
Names
- German: Georg Wilhelm Christian Albrecht Eduard Alexander Friedrich Ernst Waldemar Adolf; English: George William Christian Albert Edward Alexander Frederick Ernest Waldemar Adolphus
- House: Hanover
- Father: Ernest Augustus, Crown Prince of Hanover
- Mother: Princess Thyra of Denmark

George William, Hereditary Prince of Hanover, Duke of Brunswick-Lüneburg (German: Georg Wilhelm Christian Albert Edward Alexander Friedrich Ernst Waldemar Adolf; 28 October 1880 – 20 May 1912) was a German prince from the House of Hanover. He was a paternal great-great grandson of George III of the United Kingdom and maternal grandson of Christian IX of Denmark.

He died in a car crash near Nackel, Germany, in May 1912.

== Early life and family ==
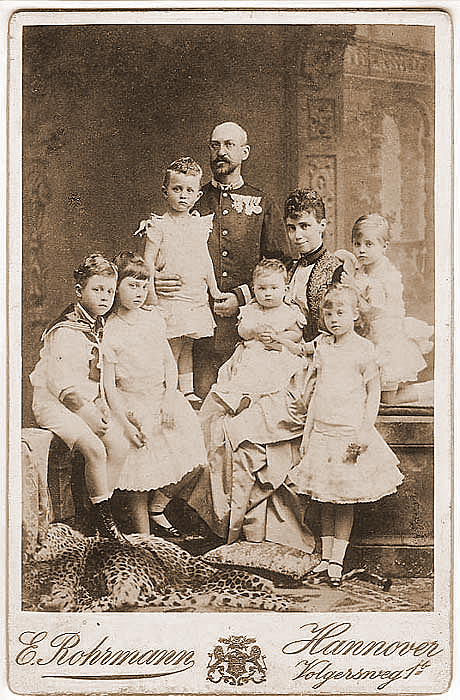
George William, left, with his family, c. 1888

George William was born in Gmunden, Austria, on 28 October 1880. He was the second child and eldest son of Ernest Augustus, Crown Prince of Hanover and Duke of Cumberland, and Princess Thyra of Denmark. His father was the only son of George V of Hanover and his mother was the youngest daughter of Christian IX of Denmark. His great-grandfather, Prince Ernest Augustus, Duke of Cumberland and Teviotdale, the fifth son of George III of the United Kingdom, became king of Hanover in 1837 because Salic Law barred Queen Victoria from inheriting the Hanoverian throne.

George William was christened in Gmunden on 21 November 1880. His godparents included his maternal grandfather Christian IX of Denmark, his uncle George I of Greece, his uncle Frederick, Crown Prince of Denmark, his uncle Alexander Alexandrovich, Tsarevich of Russia, his uncle Albert Edward, Prince of Wales, his uncle Prince Valdemar of Denmark, Prince George, Duke of Cambridge, and William, Duke of Brunswick.

The family had lived in exile in Austria since the Kingdom of Hanover was annexed by Prussia in the aftermath of the 1866 Austro-Prussian War. His father succeeded as pretender to the Hanoverian throne and as Duke of Cumberland and Teviotdale in the peerage of Great Britain in 1878. George William was heir apparent to the dukedom of Cumberland and to the Hanoverian claim. Through his mother, he was a first cousin of Christian X of Denmark, Haakon VII of Norway, George V of the United Kingdom, Constantine I of Greece, and Nicholas II of Russia.

== Later life ==
George William's life was marred by ill health. He was commissioned as an officer in the 42nd Regiment of the Imperial and Royal Army, yet never served with his regiment. He spent many winters in the warmer climate of Egypt. He was keenly interested in automobiles and hunting. He represented his father at the funeral of Edward VII and the coronation of George V.

When his kinsman William, Duke of Brunswick, died unmarried in 1884, George William was his heir after his father. Otto von Bismarck blocked Crown Prince Ernest Augustus's claim because he had never relinquished his claim to Hanover and instead appointed Prince Albert of Prussia regent. Prince Albert died in 1906 and Crown Prince Ernest Augustus offered that he and George William would renounce their claims to Brunswick to allow his second son Prince Ernest Augustus to succeed. The Bundesrat rejected this and appointed Duke John Albert of Mecklenburg as regent. The younger Ernest Augustus finally succeeded in 1913 after he married the German Emperor's daughter after George William's death.

== Death ==
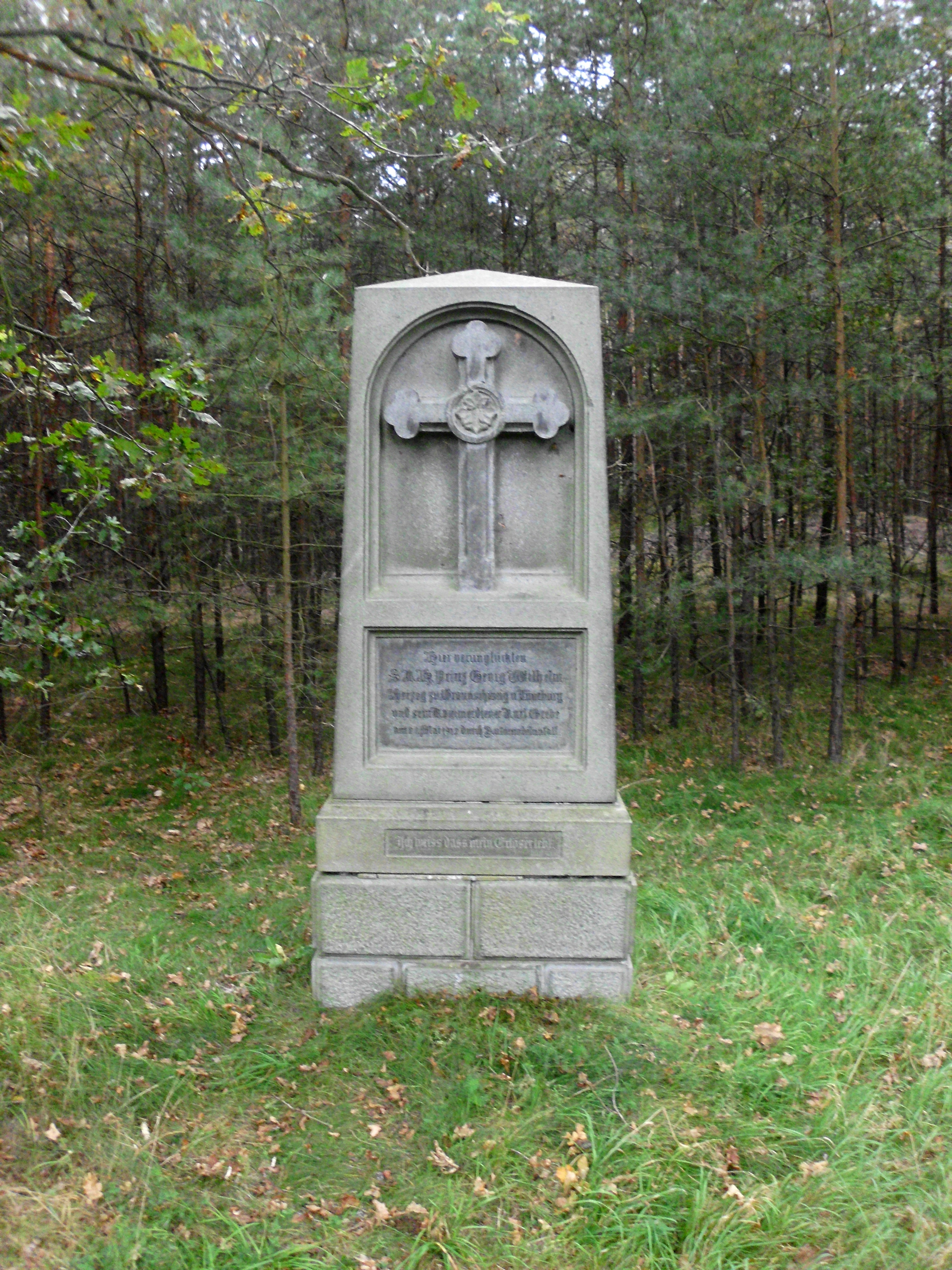
Memorial marker at the site of the crash near Nackel

On 20 May 1912, George William was killed, aged 31, in a car crash near Nackel, Brandenburg, while driving from Prague to Copenhagen to attend the funeral of his uncle, Frederick VIII of Denmark. He lost control of the vehicle after turning a corner at 60 miles per hour and hitting a patch of uneven road surface. He was travelling with his chauffeur, who survived the crash, and his valet, who was killed.

He was buried in the family mausoleum at Cumberland Castle in Gmunden.

In response to George William's death, Wilhelm II, German Emperor, sent his sons Prince Eitel Friedrich and Prince August Wilhelm of Prussia to Nackel and sent a message of condolence to the Duke of Cumberland. In response to this friendly gesture, the Duke sent his only surviving son, Ernest Augustus, to Berlin to thank the Emperor. In Berlin, Ernest Augustus met and fell in love with the emperor's only daughter, Princess Victoria Louise of Prussia. They married in 1913, thus reconciling the Houses of Hohenzollern and Hanover, and the Emperor approved Ernest Augustus's succession to the duchy of Brunswick shortly after.

== Honours ==
- Kingdom of Hanover: Knight of the Order of St. George
- Denmark: Knight of the Order of the Elephant (RE; 9 October 1898)
- United Kingdom: Honorary Knight Grand Cross of the Royal Victorian Order (GCVO; 8 June 1910)

== Ancestry ==
Ancestors of George William, Hereditary Prince of Hanover

8. Ernest Augustus, King of Hanover
4. George V of Hanover
9. Duchess Frederica of Mecklenburg-Strelitz
2. Ernest Augustus, Crown Prince of Hanover
10. Joseph, Duke of Saxe-Altenburg
5. Princess Marie of Saxe-Altenburg
11. Duchess Amelia of Württemberg
1. George William, Hereditary Prince of Hanover
12. Friedrich Wilhelm, Duke of Schleswig-Holstein-Sonderburg-Glücksburg
6. Christian IX of Denmark
13. Princess Louise Caroline of Hesse-Kassel
3. Princess Thyra of Denmark
14. Prince William of Hesse-Kassel
7. Princess Louise of Hesse-Kassel
15. Princess Charlotte of Denmark
