= Kłodzko Fortress =

Fortress in Poland

- Twierdza Kłodzko (Polish)
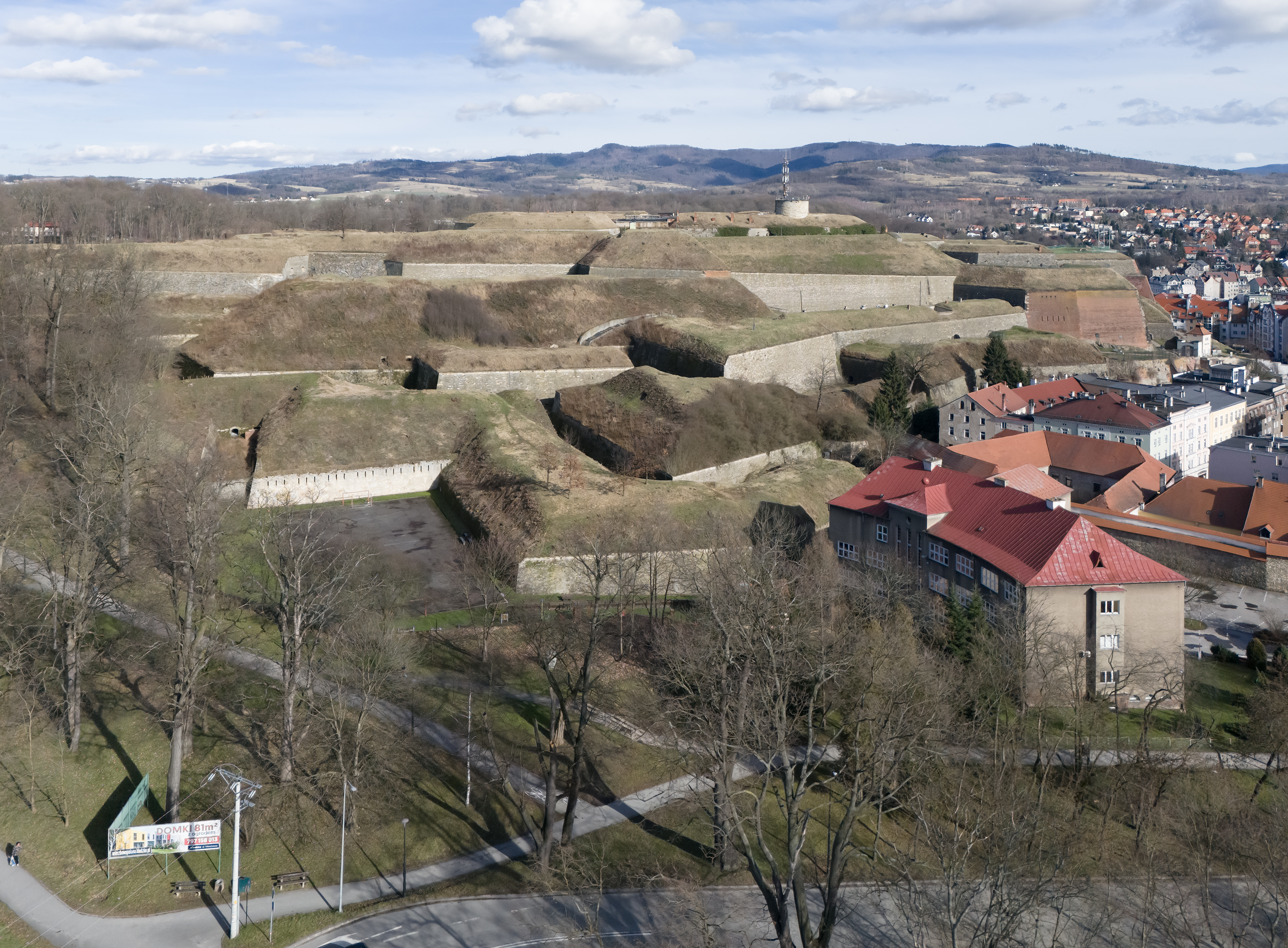
- Kłodzko Fortress, with the city in the background

- Location within Poland

General information
- Type: fortification
- Location: Kłodzko, Poland
- Coordinates: 50°26′29″N 16°39′11″E

Kłodzko Fortress (Polish: Twierdza Kłodzko, German: Festung Glatz) is a unique fortification complex of the Lower Silesian Voivodeship in southwestern Poland. The fortress once was one of the biggest strongholds in Prussian Silesia, however, in the whole German Empire, it was regarded as a minor one. Now, together with an extensive network of tunnels, it is one of the biggest attractions of the town of Kłodzko, with its underground labyrinth and a repository of different objects, from old fire engines to local glassware.

== History ==
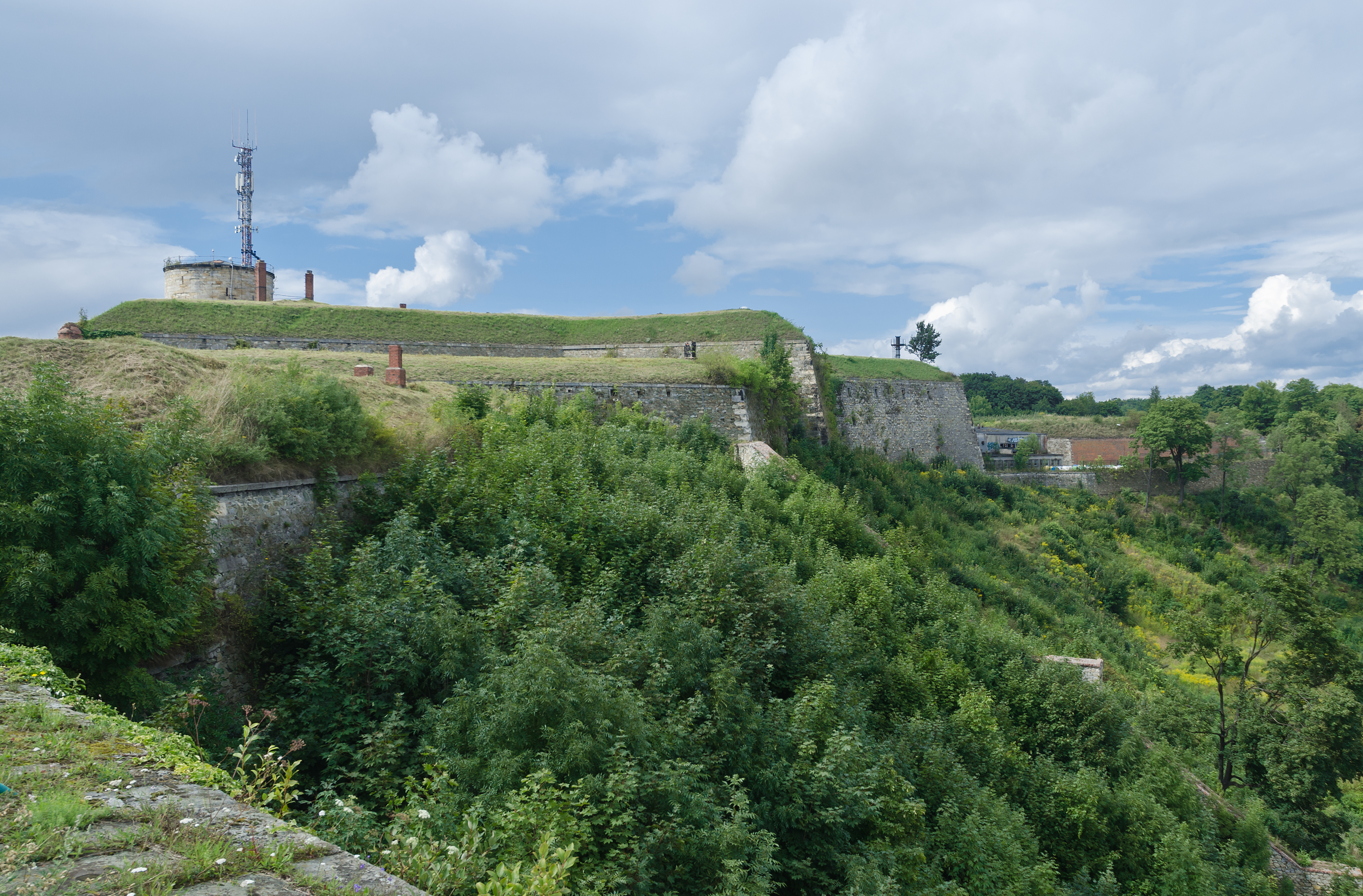
View of the bastions

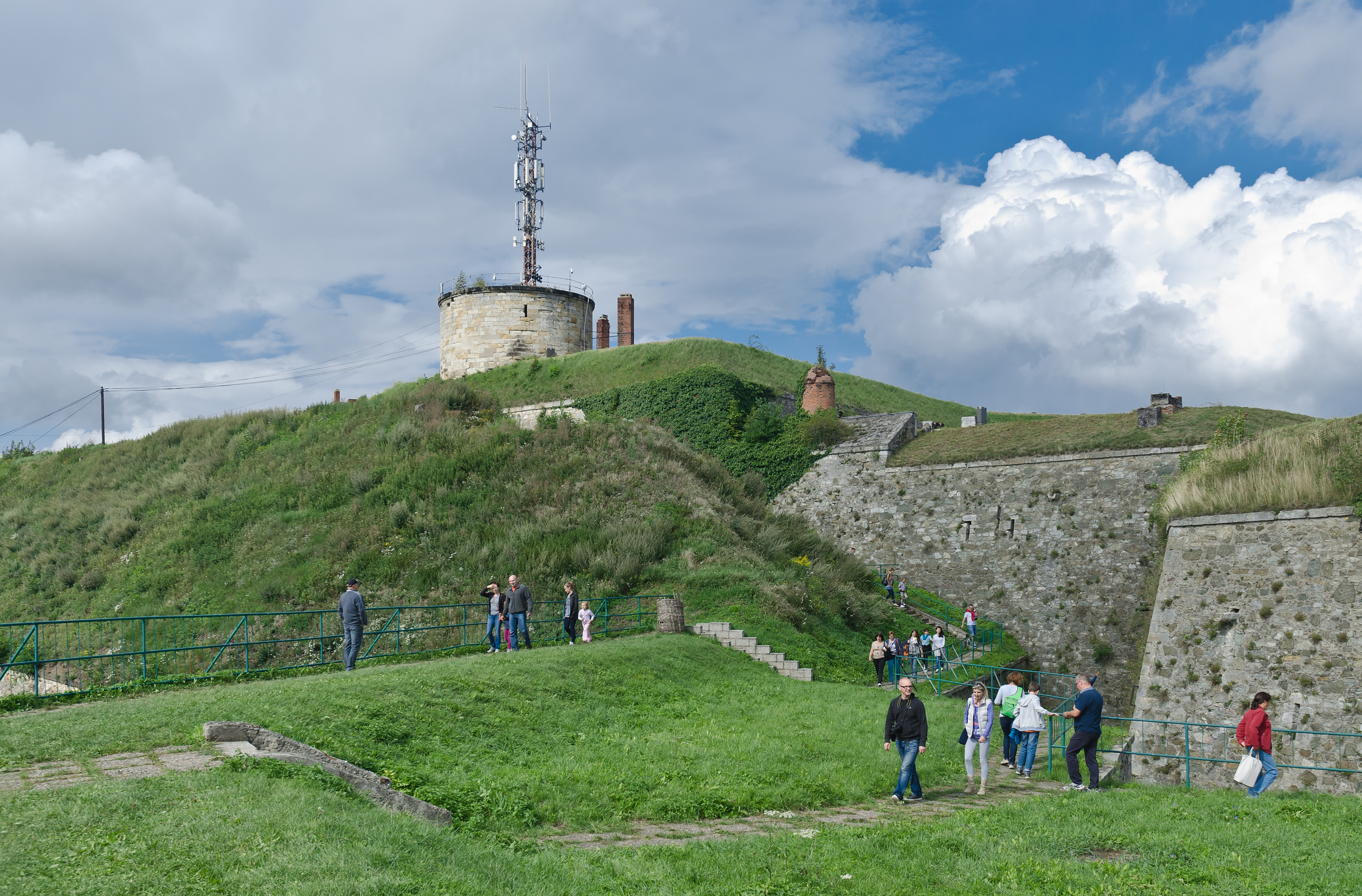
Donjon

Map of Festung Glatz in 1743

A stronghold on Kłodzko's Castle Hill was mentioned for the first time in the Chronicle of Bohemians, written by Cosmas of Prague. Most probably, it was a complex of wooden buildings, protected with a palisade. Kłodzko itself is located along the strategic route between Wrocław and Prague, and its role as a trading point must have been significant since the early Middle Ages. In 1114, the stronghold was captured and destroyed by Bohemian troops under Duke Soběslav, who at the same time reconquered the whole area.

In 1129, Soběslav rebuilt the town and placed a castellan there. Some time around 1300, a spacious castle was built on the hill, which became seat of the Kłodzko County. Gradually, the castle grew, a church and a chapel were added and in 1557, Lorenz Krischke, architect at the court of Prince Ernest of Bavaria, built the Lower Castle. In the 16th century, there were five wells in the castle with the oldest one from 1393.

In 1622, during the Thirty Years' War, after the long siege, the fortress was captured by the Austrian Army. The city was besieged in June of that year, but for a long time resisted the attackers. Finally, the Austrians brought in two large cannons - the Wingless Dragon and the Black Sow to fire upon the walls of Kłodzko and the city surrendered on October 25. In subsequent years the Austrians modernized the fortress and replaced ancient fortifications with up-to-date bastions.

In 1742, during the War of the Austrian Succession the city together with its stronghold was conquered by Prussia under Frederick II. The city itself surrendered on January 14, but the fortress, with 2000 soldiers, held out until April 25, when starvation made further resistance impossible. Out of the initial Austrian garrison of 2000, only 200 survived, "pale as shadows". The Prussians expanded the fortress, making it a defensive one. Major works continued during the Silesian Wars, until 1770, however, the fortress was not fully completed 200 years after the Austrians began to modernize it.

in 1745 by Frederick II order at Kłodzko (then under the Germanized name Glatz) under the guard of Heinrich August de la Motte Fouqué was imprisoned a Prussian officer Friedrich von der Trenck. Next year he escaped from the fortress.

=== Prison ===
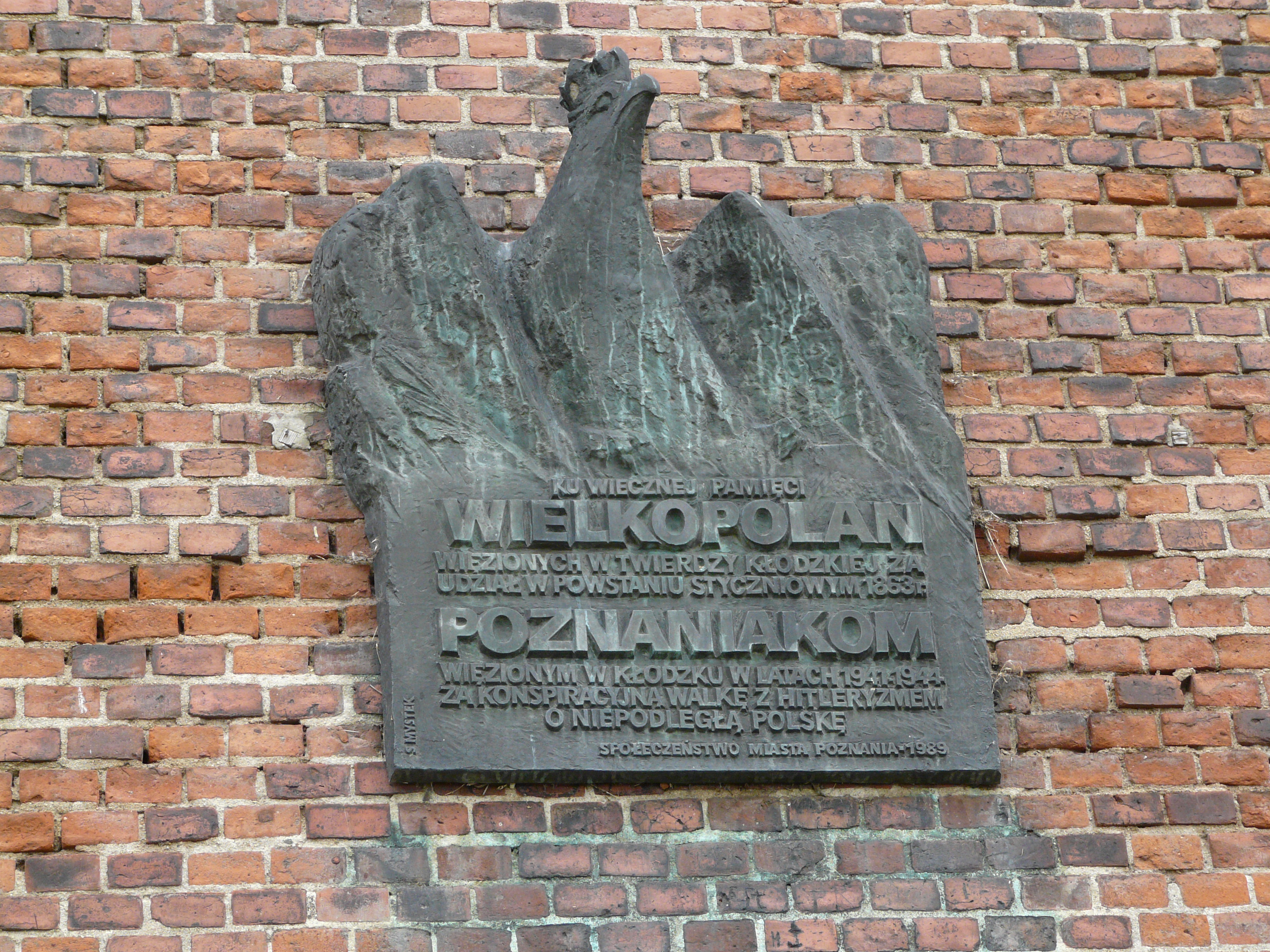
Memorial to Polish insurgents of the January Uprising and members of the Polish resistance movement in World War II imprisoned in the fortress by the Germans

In the 19th century, the stronghold, which in 1807 was captured by the French Army supported by Bavarian troops became a prison. In early 19th century, due to economic depression, prisoners' earnings in Glatz were so low that the administration would send a prisoner every Saturday to beg for help in the city. During the 19th-century Polish national liberation fights, many Polish insurgents and activists were imprisoned in the fortress, including publicist Włodzimierz Adolf Wolniewicz, historian Wojciech Kętrzyński and priest Augustyn Szamarzewski. Among prisoners there, was also a British Army captain Bertrand Stewart, who in 1911 was accused of espionage and released in 1913.

During World War II, the fortress housed a Nazi prison administered by the Reich Ministry of Justice and Wehrmacht. It housed prisoners of various nationalities, including Allied prisoners of war. The stronghold also housed a subcamp of the Gross-Rosen concentration camp.

In 1941–1942, many prisoners were sent to forced labour in various locations, including Ludwikowice Kłodzkie, Sieradz, Kędzierzyn, Hlučín, Blechhammer, Wiener Neustadt, Döllersheim and Moosbierbaum, and in 1942–1943, six FStGA field penal battalions (1, 7, 10, 13, 16, 20) were established in there and afterwards relocated to the eastern front.

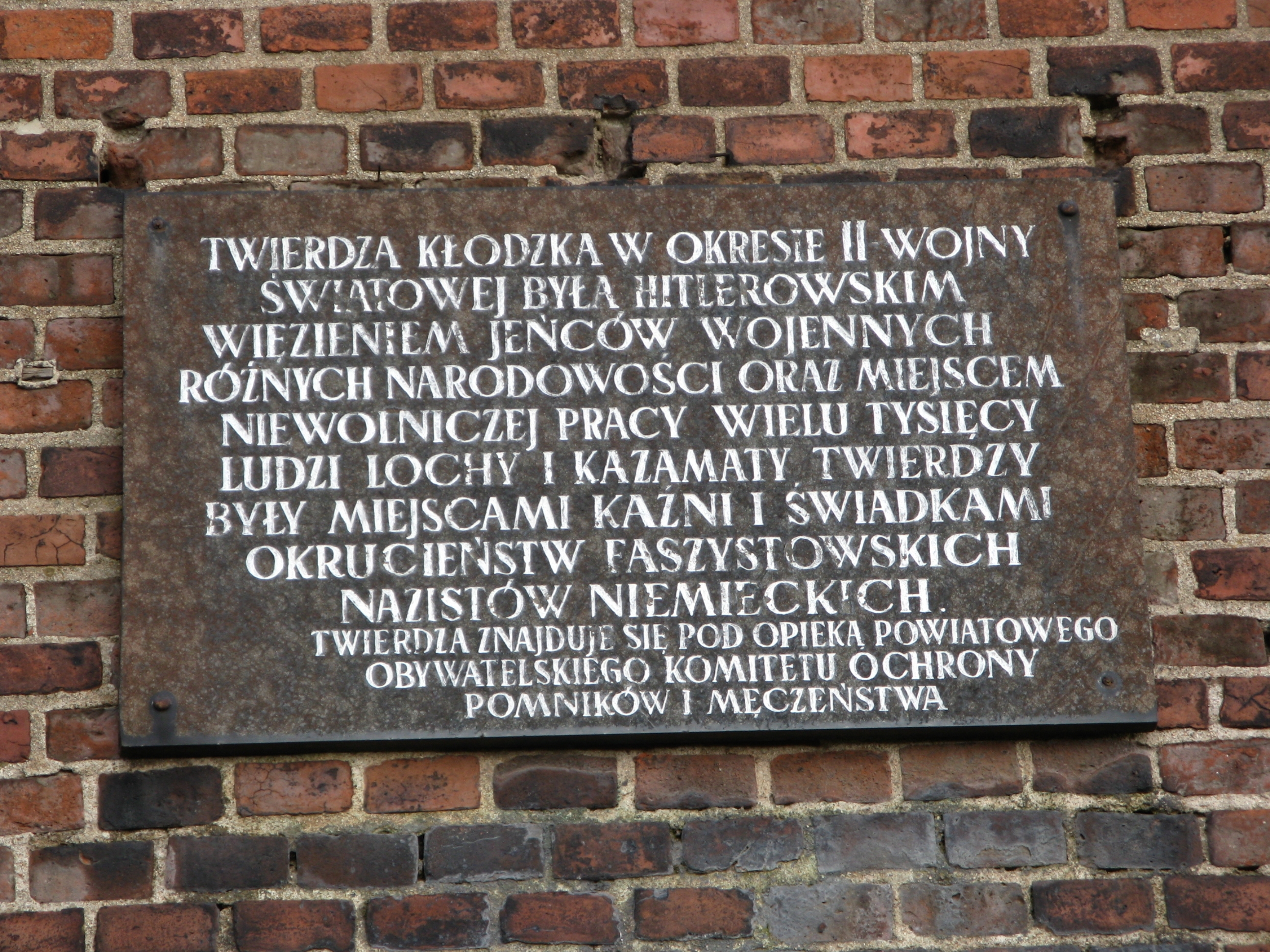
Memorial to Allied POWs and forced laborers of various nationalities held in the fortress by the Germans in WWII

The Germans also carried out executions of prisoners in the fortress, whereas some following their death sentences were executed in Wrocław. 198 prisoners were deported from the prison to various concentration camps, chiefly Gross-Rosen. In 1944, the AEG arms factory with 1,500 Polish forced laborers was relocated from Łódź to the fortress.

Presumably only two men, a Pole and a Russian, managed to escape from the prison (on 23 September 1944).

In January and February 1945, many prisoners from other locations, including Katowice, Racibórz, Brzeg and Nysa, were brought to the prison during either death marches or transports, and many were then sent further west to Bautzen. A part of the prison's population was sent in January 1945 to nearby Ząbkowice Śląskie.

With the defeat of Germany in the war, the fortress, along with the town, became again part of Poland in 1945.

There are several memorials in the fortress, dedicated to its former prisoners, including Polish insurgents of the January Uprising and members of the Polish resistance movement in World War II, Polish historian Wojciech Kętrzyński, Polish forced laborers of the AEG arms factory and Allied POWs of various nationalities.

== Currently ==
The Kłodzko Fortress looks like it did 200 years ago with little changes, and it is one of the main tourist attractions of the city. Between May and October, it is open from 9:00 to 19:00 and in the winter, it is open from 9:00 to 16:00. From its top, there are views of the Kłodzko Valley. It is also possible to visit the cellars, with a labyrinth of underground corridors, excavated in the 19th century by prisoners of war.

The stronghold's complex covers an area of 17 hectares. Its lower walls are 11 meters thick, and the upper walls are around four meters. According to some sources, it is the largest and the best preserved fortress of its kind in Poland.
