= Bertrand Stewart =

English solicitor and spy (1872–1914)

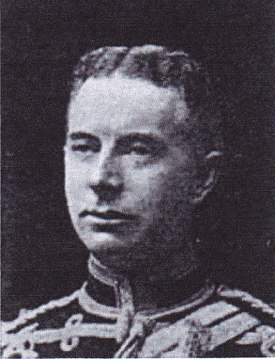
- Born: December 1872; 38 Eaton Place London, England
- Died: 12 September 1914 (aged 41); Near the River Vesle Battle of the Marne
- Burial place: Braisne Communal Cemetery A3
- Spouse(s): Amy Daphne, daughter of Lt.-Colonel George Kendall Priaulx
- Military career
- Allegiance: United Kingdom
- Rank: Captain
- Commands: Queen's Own West Kent Yeomanry
- Conflicts: Second Boer War; First World War
- Awards: Queen's South Africa Medal
- Other work: Spy, solicitor

Bertrand Stewart (December 1872 – 12 September 1914) worked as a solicitor in London and was also a military officer in the Queen's Own West Kent Yeomanry, he fought in the Second Boer War and the First World War. In between the two wars he volunteered to spy on German naval actions. He was famously arrested in Germany on 2 August 1911 and sentenced to four years in prison. Stewart and another British spy, Captain Trench, were pardoned and released by the German Kaiser as a present to Ernest Augustus the Duke of Brunswick when Augustus married the Kaiser's daughter, Princess Victoria Louise of Prussia. He died fighting off a German attack near the River Vesle during the Battle of the Marne.

== Early life ==
Stewart went to school at Eton (Durnford's House). He then went up to Christ Church, Oxford, leaving in 1892. He was admitted as a solicitor in 1897 and joined the firm of Markby, Stewart & Co., of Coleman Street, London.

== Military career and spycraft ==
When the Boer War started, Bertrand joined the West Kent as a private. He fought in British operations at Cape Colony, Orange River Colony, and the Transvaal. In 1906 he became an officer in the Queen's Own West Kent Yeomanry.

In 1911, Stewart volunteered to spy on Germany while he pretended to be a tourist. He was arrested after receiving a code book from a turned German double agent. Stewart had accomplices but was the only one arrested in Bremen. He was then trying to gain information about the defences of the East Frisian islands and the Weser estuary. Stewart was tried by the Supreme Court of the Empire at Leipzig on 31 January 1912. After four days, he was found guilty and sentenced to three-and-a-half years in the Glatz Fortress.

Stewart and another British spy, Captain Trench, were pardoned and released by the German Emperor Wilhelm II as a present to Ernest Augustus the Duke of Brunswick when Augustus married the Kaiser's daughter, Princess Victoria Louise of Prussia. (They married on 24 May 1913). Stewart was annoyed at his capture and sued the British government for £12,500 for damage to his health. Some consider Stewart to have been a fantasist.

When the Great War started, he was quickly given a position in the Intelligence Department on the Staff of Major General Allenby. During the Battle of the Marne, in the opening months of the war, his unit was facing fierce German attacks when he grabbed a rifle and went to help the men at the front lines. He was found dead by a future author and member of the same unit, Frederick Coleman, near the River Vesle.
