= Bernard Frederick Trench =

British soldier and famous spy

- Born: 17 July 1880; United Kingdom
- Died: 10 October 1967 (aged 87)
- Spouse: Mary Audrey Taylor
- Military career
- Allegiance: United Kingdom
- Rank: Captain
- Commands: Royal Marines
- Other work: Spy, Royal Marines

Captain Bernard Frederick Trench (17 July 1880 – 10 October 1967) was a British soldier and famous spy who was caught and convicted by the German authorities just a few years before World War I. In 1913 he was released as a present to Ernest Augustus, Duke of Brunswick, when Ernest married the German Kaiser's daughter, Princess Victoria Louise of Prussia.

== Background ==
Trench was a descendant of Lord Ashtown and of Archbishop Trench.

== Career ==
Trench was commissioned a second lieutenant in the Royal Marine Light Infantry on 1 January 1899, and promoted to lieutenant on 1 January 1900.

In 1909, Trench served as a lieutenant on HMS Cornwall (1902). With Lieutenant Vivian Brandon (whom he would be arrested also with in 1910 on espionage), he conducted covert reporting ashore of fortifications and beaches in the Baltic.

Captain Trench was arrested and went to trial with another man, Lieutenant Vivian R. Brandon R.N., who had been arrested a few days earlier. Trench had other accomplices on his mission to scout out information about the military installations on the island of Borkum but was the only person arrested from his spy ring. He was an agent of the spymaster and future first director of what would become the Secret Intelligence Service (SIS), also known as MI6, Mansfield Smith-Cumming. Trench's codename was COUNTERSCRAP.

Trench and Brandon's trial took place at the Leipzig Supreme Court in the so-called Great Court of the Reichsgericht on 22 December 1910. Convicted of espionage they were both sentenced to a term of four years.

During his imprisonment, Trench hanged himself from the ceiling by his neck but survived. In letters, he claimed that he did not intend to commit suicide or escape. Trench's letters, however, condemned Captain Lux, a French officer who escaped from the fortress during Trench's imprisonment. Trench complained that the lax security at the fort was possible because of a promise from the prisoners not to attempt to break out.

Captain Trench and another British subject caught spying, Captain Bertrand Stewart, were pardoned and released by the German Kaiser as a present to Ernest Augustus, Duke of Brunswick when Augustus married the Kaiser's daughter, Princess Victoria Louise of Prussia. (They married on 24 May 1913).

He fought in the Second World War and married Mary Audrey Taylor, daughter of Reverend Robert Fetzer Taylor, on 8 September 1943.
