= Princess Victoria Louise of Prussia =

Duchess of Brunswick from 1913 to 1918

Princess Viktoria Luise
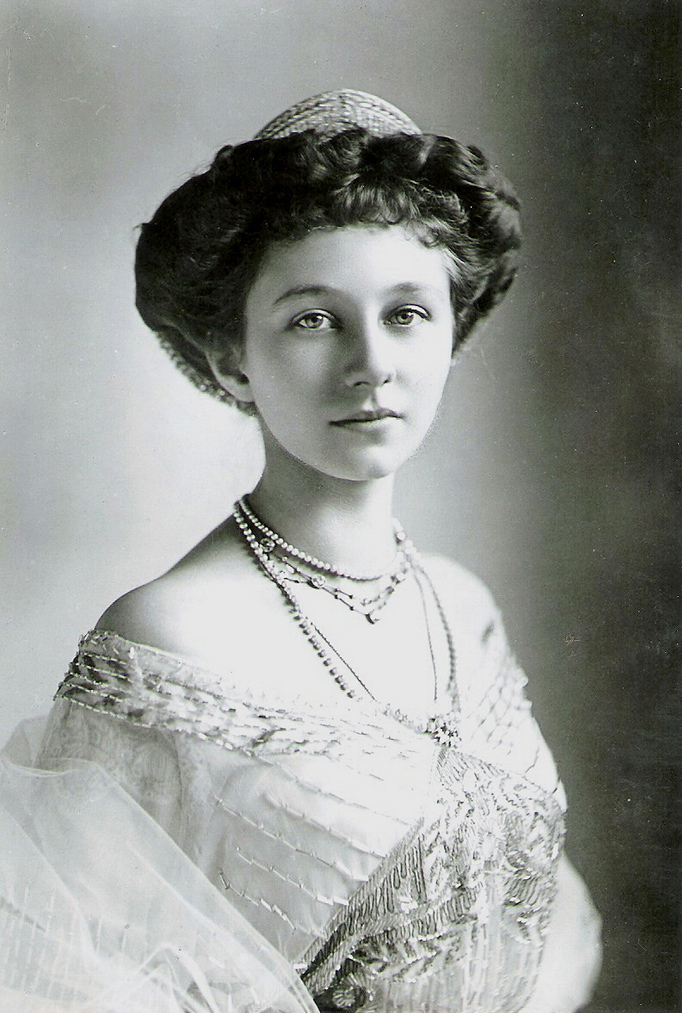
- Viktoria Luise c. 1911

Duchess consort of Brunswick
- Tenure: 1 November 1913 – 8 November 1918
- Born: 13 September 1892; Marble Palace, Potsdam, German Empire
- Died: 11 December 1980 (aged 88); Hanover, West Germany
- Burial: 20 December 1980; Berggarten Mausoleum, Hanover
- Spouse: Ernest Augustus, Duke of Brunswick (m. 1913; died 1953)
- Issue: Ernest Augustus, Hereditary Prince of Brunswick; Prince George William; Frederica, Queen of the Hellenes; Prince Christian Oscar; Prince Welf Henry
Names
- Victoria Louise Adelaide Matilda Charlotte; German: Viktoria Luise Adelheid Mathilde Charlotte
- House: Hohenzollern
- Father: Wilhelm II
- Mother: Augusta Victoria of Schleswig-Holstein

Princess Viktoria Luise of Prussia (German: Viktoria Luise Adelheid Mathilde Charlotte; 13 September 1892 – 11 December 1980) was the only daughter and youngest child of Wilhelm II, and Augusta Victoria of Schleswig-Holstein. Through her father, Viktoria Luise was a great-granddaughter of Queen Victoria of the United Kingdom.

Viktoria Luise’s 1913 wedding to Prince Ernest Augustus of Hanover was the largest gathering of reigning monarchs in Germany since German unification in 1871, and one of the last great social events of European royalty before the First World War began fourteen months later. Upon marriage, she became the Duchess of Brunswick.

== Early life and education ==
Viktoria Luise was born on 13 September 1892 at the Marmorpalais in Potsdam, the seventh child and only daughter of German Emperor Wilhelm II and Empress Augusta Victoria. "After six sons, God has given us our seventh child, a small but very strong little daughter," the empress wrote in her diary soon after the birth. The princess was baptised in the Marble Gallery of the New Palace in Potsdam on 22 October, the birthday of the empress. She was named Viktoria after her paternal great-grandmother, Queen Victoria, and Louise after her paternal great-great-grandmother, Louise of Mecklenburg-Strelitz. Known officially as Victoria Louise, she was nicknamed "Sissy" by her family.

Historian Justin C. Vovk writes that Viktoria Luise was intelligent like her paternal grandmother Empress Frederick, stately and dignified like her mother, but imperious and willful like her father. She enjoyed being the center of attention and was her father's favorite. According to her eldest brother Crown Prince Wilhelm, Victoria Louise was "the only one of us who succeeded in her childhood in gaining a snug place" in their father's heart. In 1902, her English governess, Anne Topham, observed in their first meeting that the nine-year-old princess was friendly, energetic, and always quarreling with her youngest brother, Prince Joachim. Anne later noted that the "warlike" emperor "unbends to a considerable extent when in the bosom of his family," and is the "dominating force of his daughter's life. His ideas, his opinions on men and things are persistently quoted by her."

The family resided at Homburg Castle, and Viktoria Luise and Joachim would often visit their cousins – the children of the Prussian princesses Margaret and Sophia – at nearby Kronberg Castle. In 1905, the princess studied music with concert pianist Sandra Droucker. For one week in May 1911, Victoria Louise traveled to England aboard the royal yacht Hohenzollern with her parents, where they visited their cousin George V, for the unveiling of a statue of Queen Victoria in front of Buckingham Palace. The princess's confirmation took place at Friedenskirche in Potsdam on 18 October 1909.

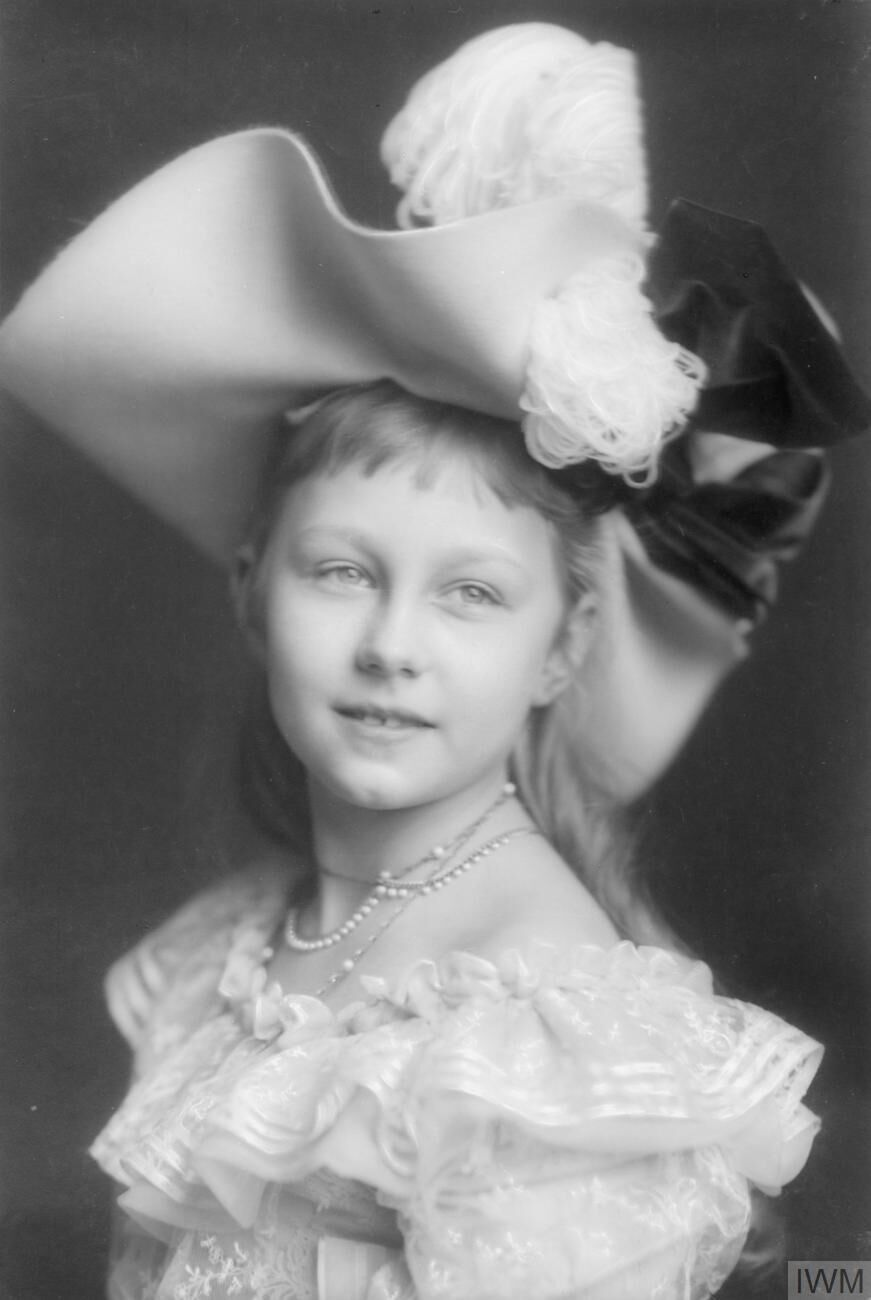
Viktoria Luise in 1902, aged 10

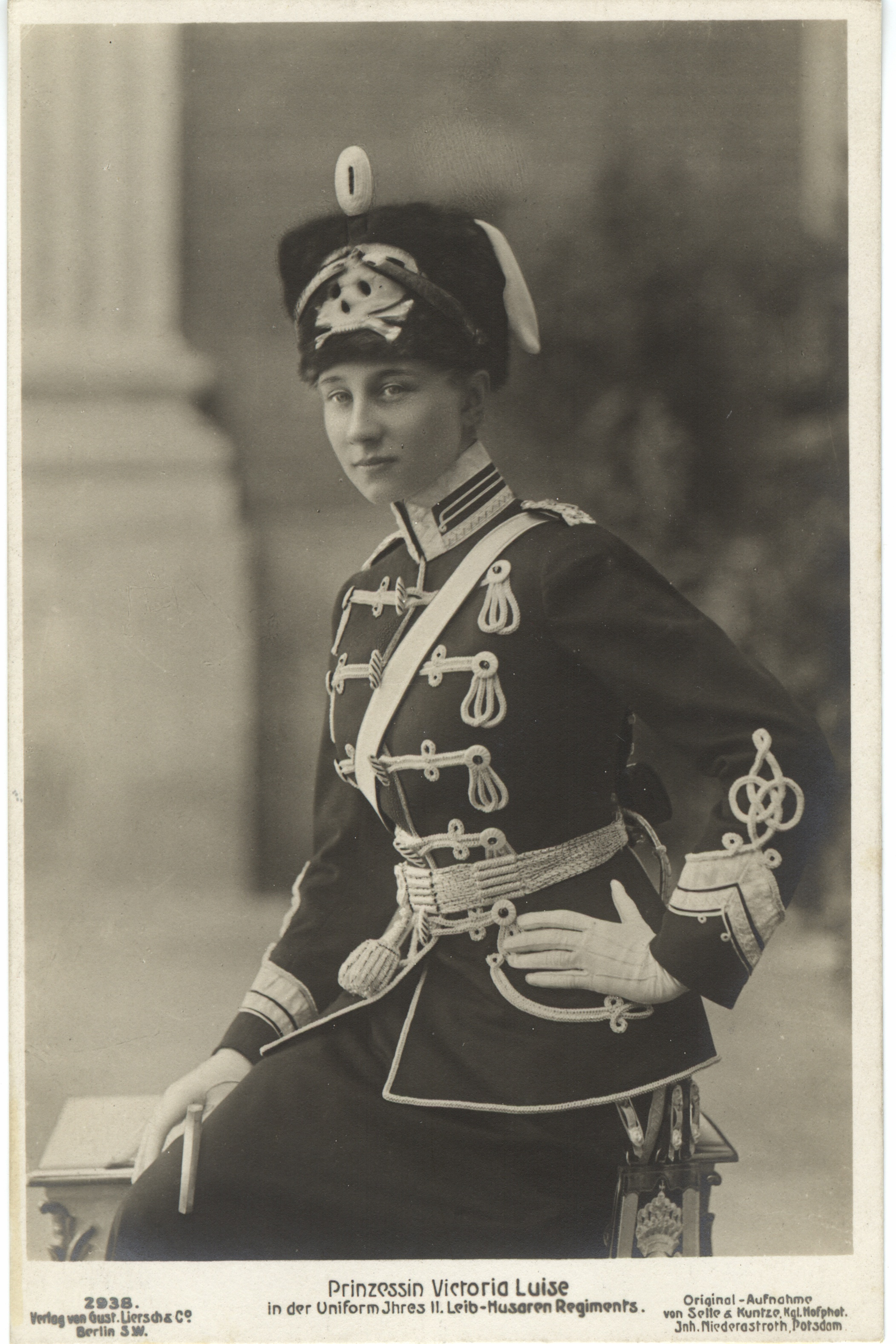
Victoria Louise in 1909, as Honorary Colonel of the II. Prussian Life Hussars Regiment

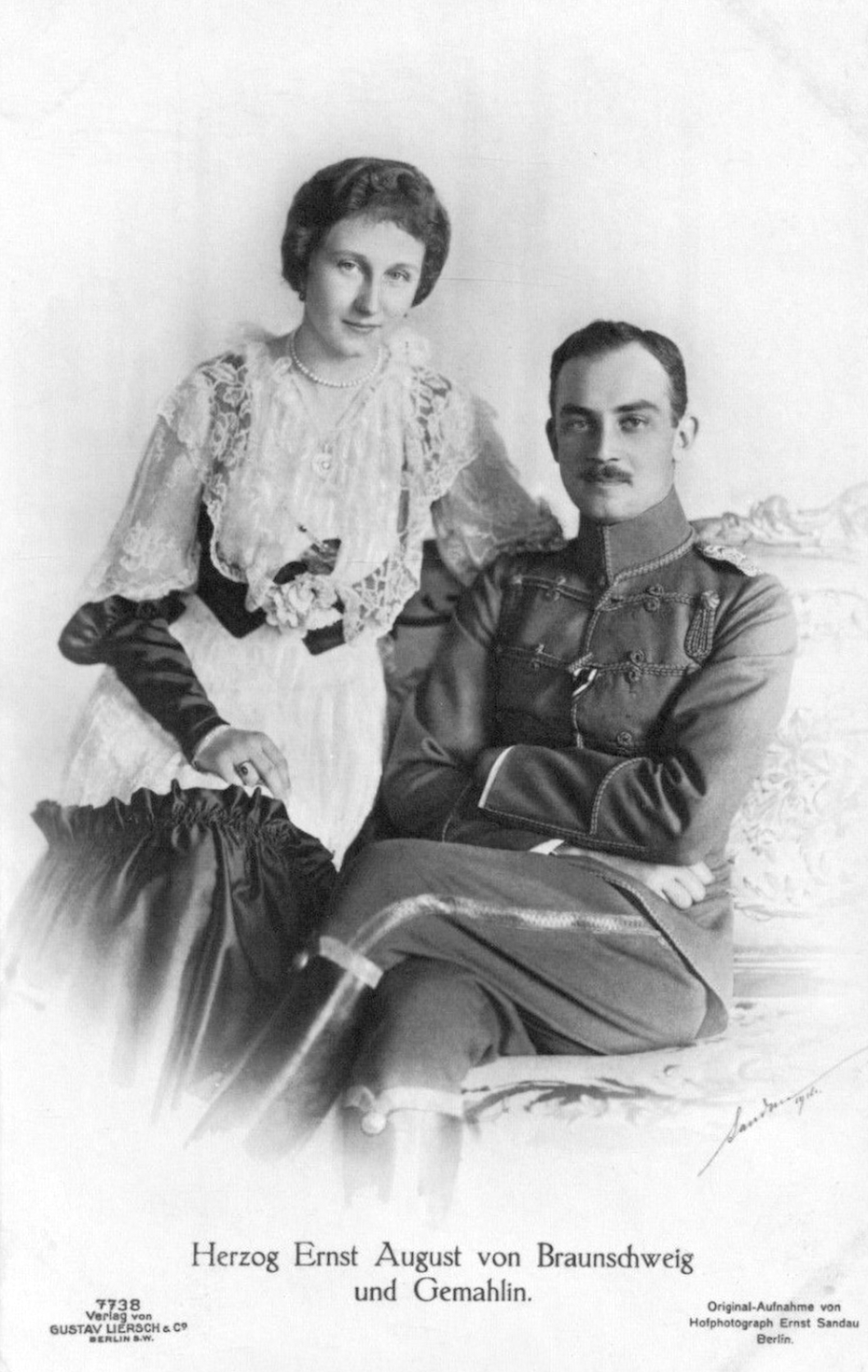
Victoria Louise and Ernest Augustus, Duke of Brunswick (before 1918)

== Marriage ==
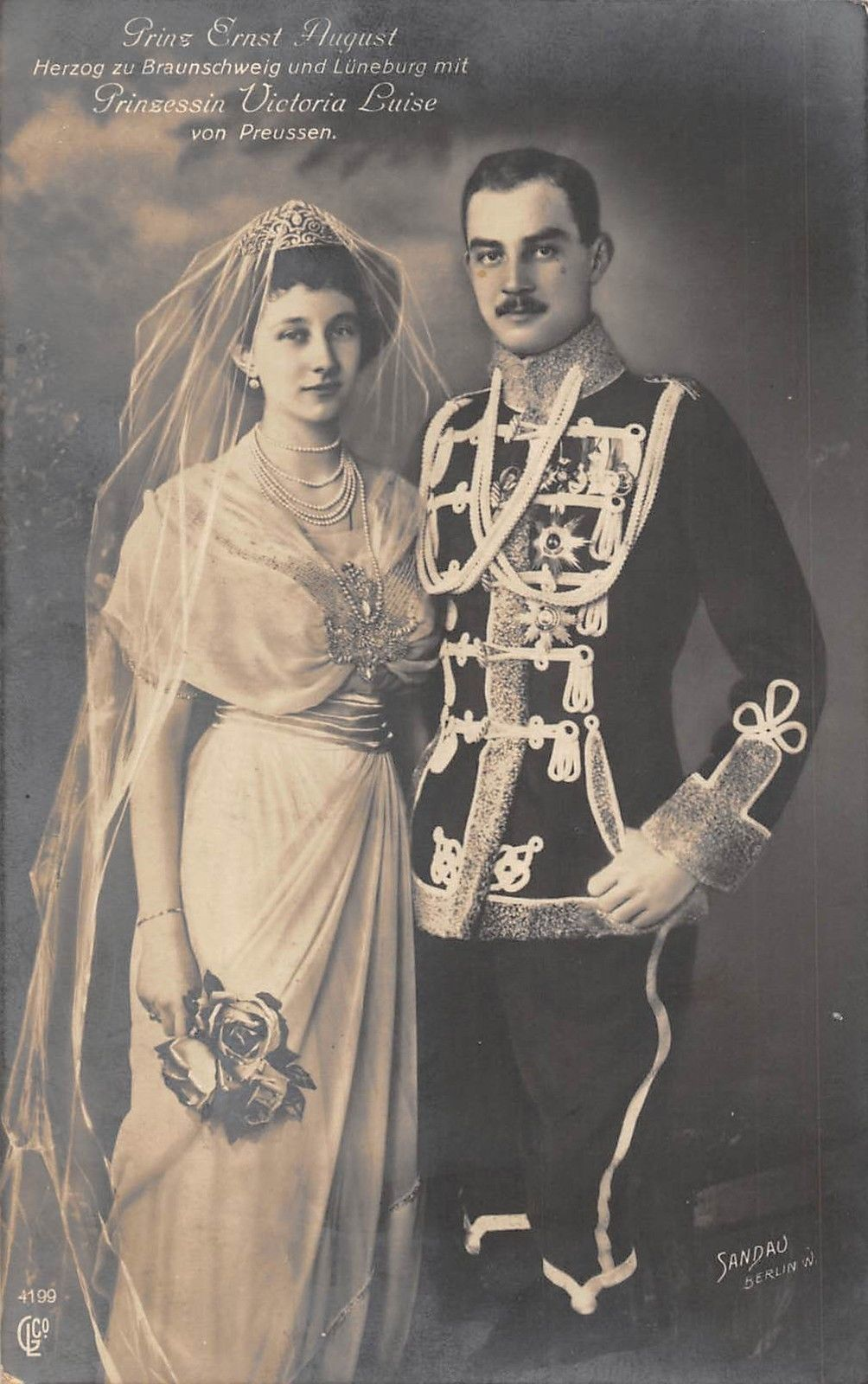
Princess Viktoria Luise and Prince Ernest Augustus, 1913

In 1912, Ernest Augustus, the wealthy heir-apparent to the title of Duke of Cumberland and Teviotdale, came to the Berlin court to thank Emperor Wilhelm for having Crown Prince Wilhelm and Prince Eitel Friedrich attend the funeral of his brother, Prince George William. At the time, the House of Hanover lived in exile at Gmunden, Austria. While in Berlin, Ernest Augustus met Victoria Louise and the two became smitten with each other. However, any discussions of marriage were prolonged for months due to political concerns; Ernest Augustus was also the heir to the Kingdom of Hanover, which the Kingdom of Prussia annexed following the 1866 Austro-Prussian War. The Prussian crown prince was displeased with the match and wished that Ernest Augustus would abdicate his rights to Hanover; in a compromise, it was decided that, in exchange, he would succeed to the smaller duchy of Brunswick, of which his father was the lawful heir. The family had been barred from the succession to Brunswick due to their claims towards the Hanoverian kingdom.

Ernest and Viktoria became engaged in Karlsruhe on 11 February 1913. Their extravagant wedding took place on 24 May 1913 in Berlin. It was hailed in the press as the end of the rift between the House of Hanover and House of Hohenzollern that had existed since the 1866 annexation. The Times described the union as akin to Romeo and Juliet, albeit with a happier ending. Despite press fixation on the union as a love match, whether the match was one of love or politics remains unclear; historian Eva Giloi believes that the marriage was more likely the result of Prussia's desire to end the rift, though Victoria Louise described it as a "love match" in one of her letters.

In a diplomatic gesture, Emperor Wilhelm invited almost all of his extended family. He also pardoned and released two imprisoned British spies, Captain Bertrand Stewart and Captain Bernard Frederick Trench, as a present to the United Kingdom. The wedding became the largest gathering of reigning monarchs in Germany since German unification in 1871, and one of the last great social events of European royalty before World War I began fourteen months later. Attendees included Wilhelm's cousins George V and Tsar Nicholas II, who were also cousins of Ernest Augustus through their mothers. The wedding feast included 1,200 guests. Empress Augusta Victoria took the separation from her only daughter badly and wept. In a 2003 documentary, Constantine II of Greece, a grandson of the couple, recounted that their wedding was "the last time all the heads of state of Europe met" before the start of World War I.

== Husband and children ==
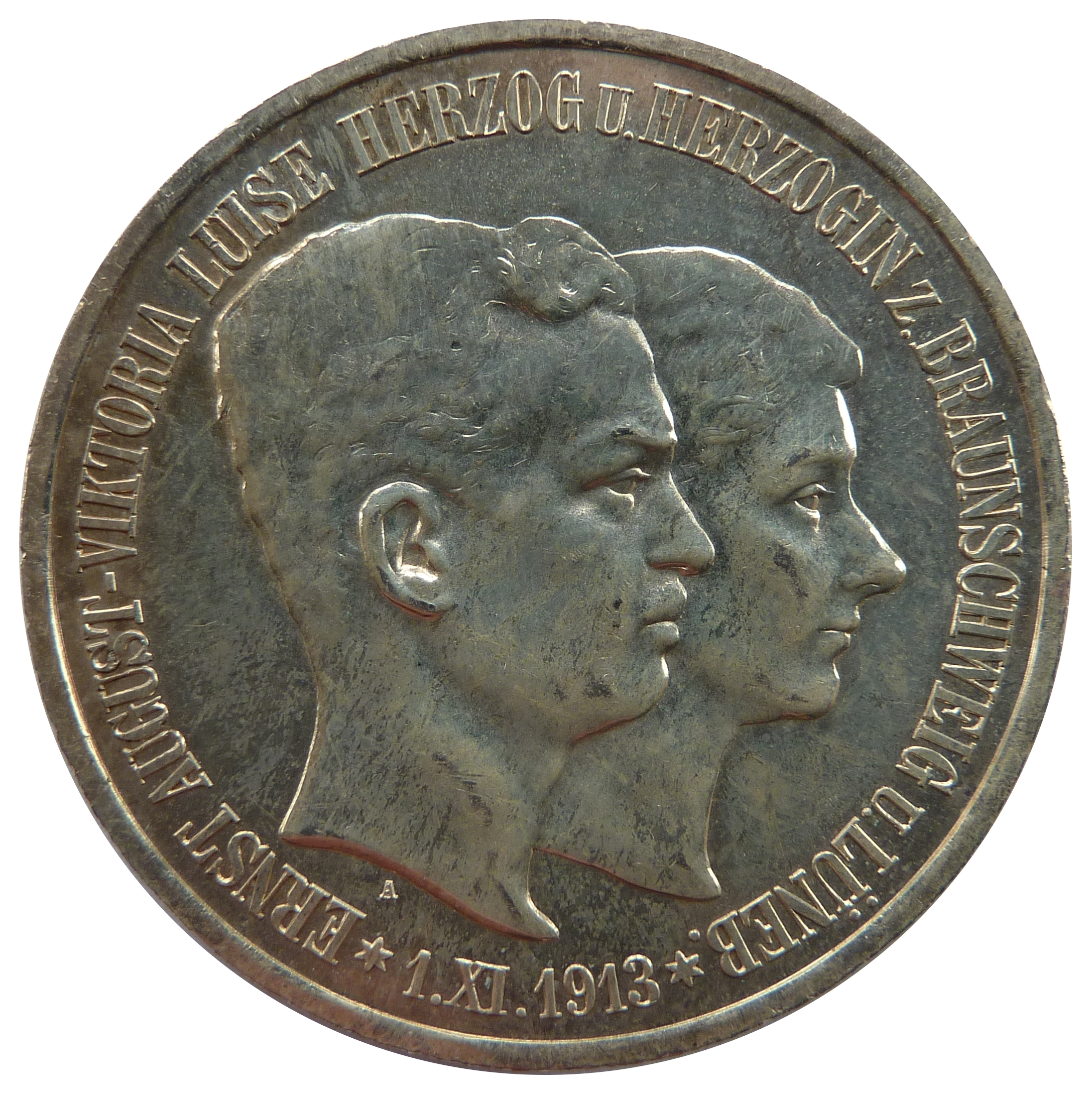
A 5 Mark coin of Brunswick commemorating the accession of Ernest Augustus and Victoria Louise.

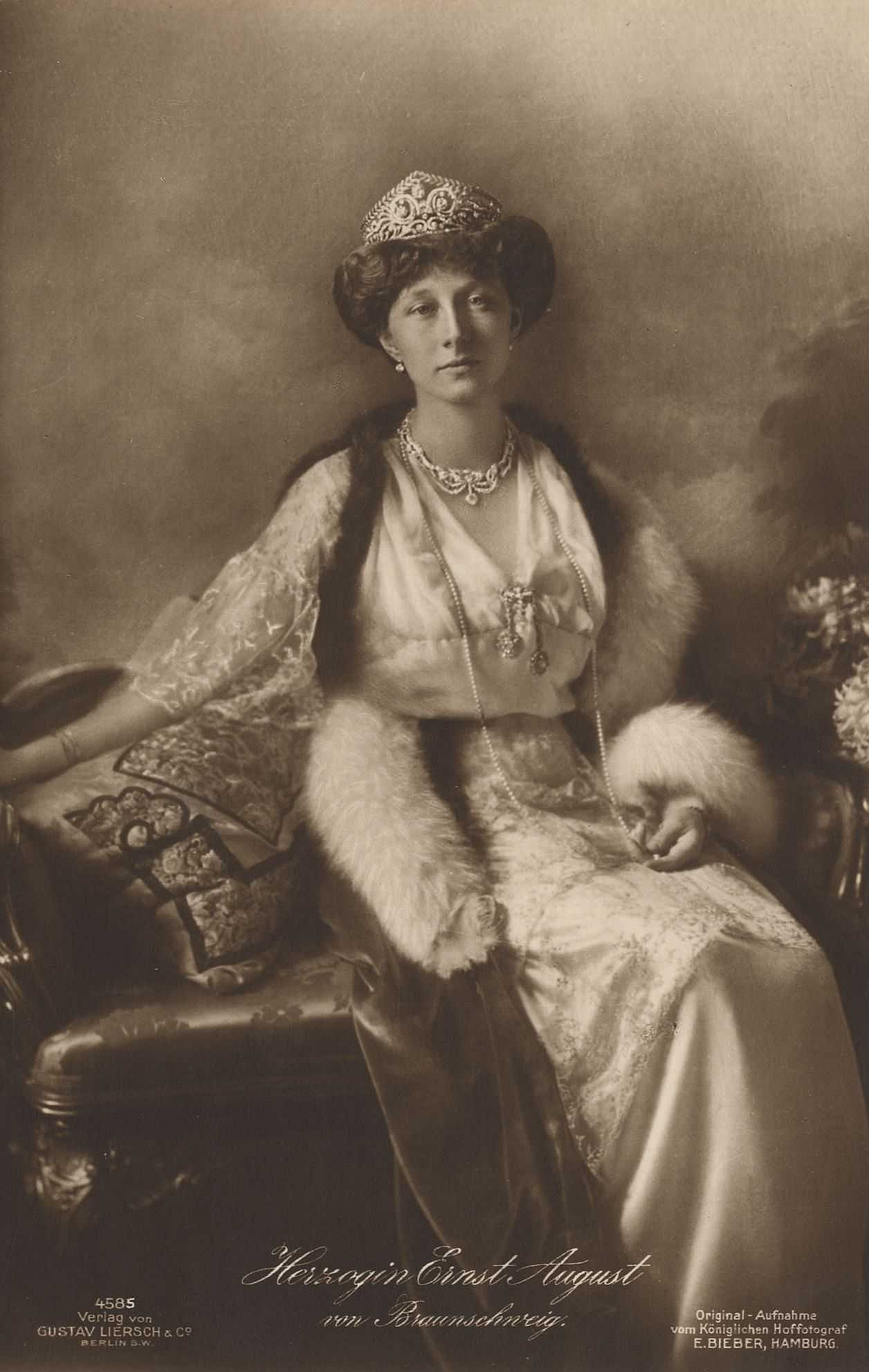
Victoria Louise, c. 1918

The new duke and duchess of Brunswick moved into Brunswick Palace in the capital of Brunswick and began their family with the birth of their eldest son, Prince Ernest Augustus (1914–1987), less than a year after their wedding. They had four further children: Prince George William (1915–2006), Princess Frederica (1917–1981), Prince Christian Oscar (1919–1981), and Prince Welf Henry (1923–1997). Through Frederica, Victoria Louise was a great-grandmother of Felipe VI of Spain.

On 8 November 1918, her husband was forced to abdicate his throne along with the other German kings, grand dukes, dukes, and princes, and the duchy of Brunswick was subsequently abolished. The next year, he was deprived of his British peerages under the Titles Deprivation Act 1917 as a result of his service in the German army during the war. Thus, when his father died in 1923, Ernest Augustus did not succeed to his father's British title of Duke of Cumberland.

== Interwar years ==
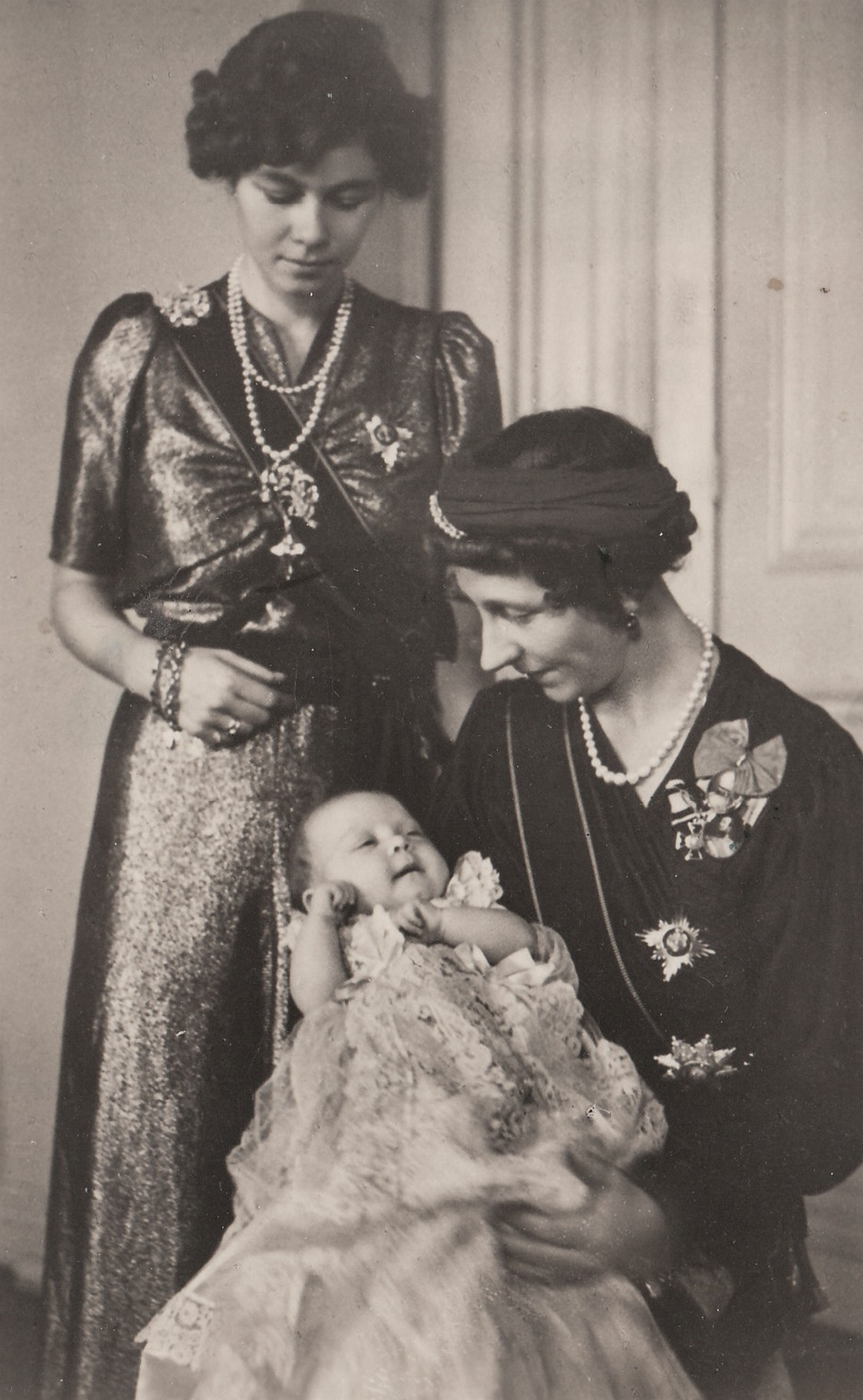
Victoria Louise with her daughter Frederica and granddaughter Sofia, the future Queen of Spain, 1939.

Following the German Revolution of 1918 and the abdication of her husband on 8 November, Viktoria Luise lost her position as Duchess of Brunswick. The end of the monarchy forced the family to leave the country and settle in Austria. She moved with Ernest Augustus and their five children to Gmunden in Upper Austria, where the family established its principal residence at Cumberland Castle, the former home of Ernest Augustus's father, the Duke of Cumberland. The family's departure brought an abrupt end to Victoria Louise's life as a reigning duchess, which had lasted only five years.

During the first years of exile, Victoria Louise and her husband concentrated on family life and the management of their remaining property. Ernest Augustus continued to regard himself as the head of the House of Hanover and retained his dynastic claims, despite the abolition of the monarchy.

Her mother, Augusta Victoria's health had deteriorated during her exile in the Netherlands, particularly following the death of her son Prince Joachim in July 1920. Victoria Louise later recalled that she had spent several weeks with her mother at Huis Doorn during the final months of 1920 and returned again in January 1921. In April, while travelling to Doorn to visit her mother, she stopped in Nuremberg and learned from a newspaper announcement that the former Empress had died that morning, on 11 April 1921. She had therefore not reached Doorn in time to be with her mother at her death. Wilhelm II and Prince Adalbert were at Auguste Victoria's bedside when she died. Victoria Louise subsequently arrived at Huis Doorn, where her father and brother told her that her mother had died peacefully. Augusta Victoria was 62 years old.

Victoria Louise and her husband also pursued legal claims concerning the property and financial assets that had belonged to the former ruling house. The negotiations over the settlement of the former royal family's property became an important issue during the early Weimar Republic, as the German states sought to determine how the possessions of the former ruling dynasties would be divided between the state and their former owners.

The settlement reached in 1924 and 1925 was favourable to the House of Hanover. The family received a number of estates and properties, including Blankenburg Castle in the Harz, Marienburg Castle near Hanover, the Calenberg estate and other agricultural and forest properties. The agreement also provided financial compensation. These arrangements enabled Ernest Augustus and Victoria Louise to maintain a substantial household and continue living as members of the former German princely aristocracy, despite no longer possessing a sovereign position.

At the end of 1925, the family returned from Austria to Germany and took up residence at Blankenburg Castle. They continued to maintain their Austrian home at Cumberland Castle in Gmunden, however, and divided their time between the two properties during the following years. Blankenburg eventually became their principal residence. Marienburg Castle also remained part of the family's property, although it was not yet their principal home. The family thus maintained residences in both Germany and Austria, while retaining the social connections and household arrangements associated with their former princely status.

Victoria Louise continued to occupy a prominent position within the social life of the former German aristocracy. Although she was no longer a reigning duchess, she retained her title and connections with the European royal houses. Her marriage had linked the Hohenzollern and Hanoverian dynasties, and she remained the only daughter of the former German emperor. Her family life centred on Ernest Augustus and their five children: Ernest Augustus, Georg Wilhelm, Christian, Welf Heinrich and Frederica. The children grew up between the family's residences in Germany and Austria, within the traditions of the former princely household.

Victoria Louise maintained contact with her parents and brothers after the family's return to Germany. Her father, the former German Emperor Wilhelm II, remained in exile at Huis Doorn in the Netherlands, while several of her brothers continued to participate in German public and political life. The former Crown Prince Wilhelm and Prince August Wilhelm were among the members of the Hohenzollern family who became early supporters of the National Socialist movement. Their political activities placed Victoria Louise and Ernest Augustus in contact with a wider circle of aristocrats who sought to recover political influence after the fall of the German monarchy.

The family's relationship with the former emperor remained important to Victoria Louise. She continued to visit and correspond with her father at Doorn, where he had lived since his exile in 1918. Although Wilhelm had lost his throne, he remained a central figure in the family's identity and Victoria Louise retained a close personal connection with him. Her visits to the Netherlands continued during the interwar period and would become particularly significant during his final illness in 1941.

The rise of National Socialism brought new political possibilities for members of the former German ruling families, many of whom hoped that the end of the Weimar Republic might lead to a restoration of the monarchy or at least an increase in their political influence. Victoria Louise and Ernest Augustus were among those who initially placed national and dynastic hopes in the movement. In 1933, the couple were invited to meet Adolf Hitler in Berlin. During their conversation, Ernest Augustus discussed the proposed reorganisation of north-western Germany, including the possibility of bringing the Hanoverian and Brunswick territories together into a larger political unit. Hitler listened to the proposal but gave no definite commitment. Historian Dieter Lent has noted that the couple initially placed hopes in National Socialism, although their expectations were not ultimately fulfilled.

Ernest Augustus never formally joined the Nazi Party, but he financially supported the movement and maintained close relations with several of its leading figures. Jonathan Petropoulos has described him as a regular donor to the Nazi Party. His position was connected partly to his dynastic ambitions and his belief that the movement might restore the political importance of the former German princely houses. Several members of Victoria Louise's own family had also become Nazi Party members, including her brother August Wilhelm, who joined in 1930, and other members of the former imperial family. Their involvement reflected the wider willingness of sections of the German aristocracy to associate themselves with the new regime.

Victoria Louise herself was involved in efforts to improve relations between Germany and Britain. Her position as the daughter of the former German emperor and the wife of a former British peer gave her access to aristocratic and political circles in both countries. During the early 1930s, she and Ernest Augustus cultivated contacts with British figures, including Lord Londonderry, in an attempt to encourage closer Anglo-German relations. Historian Karina Urbach has shown that these activities went beyond private family diplomacy: Victoria Louise was also used by Joachim von Ribbentrop in efforts to cultivate British contacts and promote German political interests abroad. Her memoirs later referred selectively to these activities as her English efforts, but subsequent historical research has placed them within the Nazi regime's broader attempts to influence British opinion.

Victoria Louise also participated in social events organised to encourage Anglo-German friendship. Ribbentrop used her and her husband to help promote the Deutsch-Englische Gesellschaft and the Anglo-German Fellowship, including at dinners attended by British visitors. At the Nuremberg Nazi Party rallies and the 1936 Olympic Games in Berlin, she helped receive and entertain British guests. These activities gave her a public role in the regime's attempts to present Germany as a country with which Britain could maintain friendly relations. Her aristocratic background and family connections made her useful to officials seeking to reach British visitors who might otherwise have been suspicious of Nazi representatives.

The extent of Victoria Louise's involvement has been discussed by historians, particularly in light of accounts by the American journalist Sigrid Schultz, who worked in Berlin during the 1930s and moved within Nazi social circles. Schultz described Victoria Louise as an enthusiastic supporter of Hitler's public appearances and reported that she actively sought contact with him at receptions. Urbach's research into Schultz's reports has also drawn attention to Victoria Louise's participation in events intended to cultivate British supporters of the regime. These accounts contrast with the more restrained presentation of her political activities in her later memoirs. Although she was not formally a member of the Nazi Party, her participation in these activities indicates that her relationship with the regime was more substantial than occasional social contact.

Hitler discussed with Victoria Louise about a proposed marriage between her daughter, Princess Frederica, and the British Prince of Wales, the future Edward VIII. Hitler was interested in improving relations with Britain and saw a dynastic marriage as a possible means of strengthening political ties between the two countries. Victoria Louise and Ernest Augustus had themselves been involved in discussions about Anglo-German rapprochement, and Hitler sought to use their family connections to advance the proposal.

According to Victoria Louise's memoirs, the proposal was conveyed to the couple by Ribbentrop following their visit to Britain in 1934–1935. Hitler wanted them to arrange a marriage between Frederica and the Prince of Wales. The idea shocked the couple, who considered the age difference unacceptable. Frederica had been born in 1917, while Edward was born in 1894, making him more than 22 years older than her. Victoria Louise later recalled that she and her husband refused to put pressure on their daughter to accept the proposal. She also noted the irony that, before the First World War, her own marriage had been discussed in connection with the same British prince, who was then younger than she was.

The proposal was not pursued. Edward became king in January 1936 following the death of his father, George V, but abdicated in December of that year in order to marry Wallis Simpson. After his abdication, he became Duke of Windsor. In 1936, Edward and Wallis visited the Duke and Duchess of Brunswick at Cumberland Castle in Gmunden, Austria. Their visit maintained the social connection between the former British and German royal circles, although the proposed marriage between Edward and Frederica had already been rejected. Victoria Louise later described the visit in her autobiography.

Instead of marrying Edward, Frederica became engaged to her second cousin, Prince Paul of Greece, heir to the Greek throne. Their marriage was arranged within the wider network of European royal families and took place in Athens on 9 January 1938. The wedding brought Victoria Louise back into the public life of a reigning royal family, as her daughter became Crown Princess of Greece.

Frederica's marriage was particularly important to Victoria Louise because it established her daughter in a royal household outside Germany at a time when the political situation in Europe was becoming increasingly unstable. Paul and Frederica would later become King and Queen of Greece in 1947. Their children included Princess Sophia, the future Queen of Spain, and Prince Constantine, who would later become King of Greece and Princess Irene. Victoria Louise's relationship with her daughter and grandchildren remained an important part of her family life during the years that followed.

By the end of the 1930s, Victoria Louise and Ernest Augustus continued to divide their time between their German and Austrian residences, while maintaining their position within the former European aristocracy. Their early hopes that National Socialism might restore the influence of the princely houses had not been realised. Nevertheless, Victoria Louise had participated in the regime's efforts to cultivate aristocratic and British connections, while her husband had provided financial support to the Nazi movement. The outbreak of the Second World War in September 1939 would soon bring an end to their pre-war social life and expose the family to the direct consequences of the regime's policies and the conflict.

== World War II ==
At the outbreak of the Second World War in September 1939, Victoria Louise was living with her husband and family at Blankenburg Castle in the Harz Mountains. The family had returned to Germany in 1933, and Victoria Louise and Ernest Augustus had initially placed hopes in the National Socialist movement. Their relationship with the regime, however, was complicated by their dynastic ambitions and their expectation that the end of the German monarchy might eventually be reversed.

=== Relations with the Nazi regime ===
During the early 1930s, Victoria Louise and Ernest Augustus maintained contacts with leading figures in the Nazi movement. In 1933, they were received by Adolf Hitler in Berlin. During the meeting, Ernest Augustus discussed the possibility of reorganising the territories of north-western Germany into a larger regional state, reflecting the family's interest in restoring the political importance of the former Duchy of Brunswick and the House of Hanover. Hitler listened to the proposal but made no definite commitment. According to historian Dieter Lent, the couple initially placed national hopes in National Socialism, although their expectations of the regime were not fulfilled.

Victoria Louise also became involved in efforts to improve relations between Germany and Britain. Through her aristocratic and family connections, she participated in social and political contacts with British figures who supported Anglo-German friendship. Her activities brought her into contact with Joachim von Ribbentrop, who subsequently used her in efforts to promote German interests abroad. Historian Karina Urbach has examined the role played by members of the former German imperial family in the Nazi regime's attempts to cultivate foreign aristocratic and political contacts, including Victoria Louise's involvement in these activities.

Victoria Louise and her husband also maintained social contact with prominent Nazi figures. In her memoirs, she described encounters with Joseph Goebbels, Heinrich Himmler and Hermann Göring. She recalled meeting Goebbels at social gatherings and speaking with Himmler about the displacement of farming families in Lower Saxony as a result of military training-ground expansion. She also described conversations with Göring at Gmunden and at a reception at the British Embassy in Berlin. Her memoir presented these encounters largely through her personal impressions.

Her involvement in Anglo-German relations was not limited to private social gatherings. She helped promote Anglo-German friendship and was involved in entertaining British visitors and cultivating contacts with sympathetic members of the British establishment. These activities formed part of the broader efforts of Ribbentrop and his associates to influence opinion in Britain before the outbreak of war. Later historical research has therefore placed Victoria Louise among the members of the former German aristocracy who lent their social standing and international connections to the regime's diplomatic and propaganda objectives.

The family's relationship with National Socialism was also shaped by its monarchist ambitions. Hitler had shown interest in restoring the monarchy during his earlier political career, and the former royal houses initially hoped that the movement might restore some of their lost position. However, the Nazi leadership had little intention of returning political authority to the former dynasties. The historian Dieter Lent noted that Victoria Louise and Ernest Augustus increasingly recognised the regime's hostility towards the German princely families when their four sons were successively removed from the Wehrmacht between 1941 and 1944. The family's early expectations of the Nazi movement had consequently given way to disappointment and conflict with the dictatorship.

Victoria Louise's family was directly affected by the outbreak of war. Her four sons—Ernest Augustus, Georg Wilhelm, Christian and Welf Heinrich—were involved in military service during the conflict. Her three eldest sons were already serving when war became imminent. In the summer of 1939, after attending the wedding of her cousin Princess Irene of Greece in Florence, Victoria Louise returned to Blankenburg and made arrangements to visit her sons if their units were mobilised. She arranged a small reserve of petrol at the castle and agreed on a coded telephone message with her sons, which would inform her that they had received orders to move to the front.

When the messages arrived, Victoria Louise travelled to see her sons. She met Ernest Augustus and Christian at an inn near Lüneburg before returning briefly to Blankenburg and continuing to Torgau to see Georg Wilhelm. The latter had little time to spend with her because his unit was preparing to depart. The separation was particularly distressing for Victoria Louise, who knew that her sons would be exposed to the dangers of military service. In her memoirs, she recalled writing to her father, Wilhelm II, at Doorn about her hopes that another European war might still be avoided.

Her sons served in different branches of the German armed forces, including the infantry, cavalry, armoured units and air force. Their military service was accompanied by anxiety over the fate of other members of the extended Hohenzollern family. In September 1939, Victoria Louise's nephew Prince Oskar of Prussia, the eldest son of her brother Oskar, was killed in Poland while serving as an infantry officer. In May 1940, another nephew, Prince Wilhelm of Prussia, eldest son of Crown Prince Wilhelm, was severely wounded during fighting in northern France and died two days later. His body was returned to Potsdam for burial beside his grandmother, Empress Augusta Victoria. The deaths of the two young princes added to the family's wartime losses.

Between 1941 and 1944, all four of Victoria Louise's sons were discharged from the Wehrmacht. Their removal from military service reflected Hitler's increasingly hostile attitude towards the former ruling houses of Germany. For Victoria Louise and Ernest Augustus, this was a particularly bitter development because their sons had already served in the armed forces and the family had initially expected the Nazi movement to restore the standing of the old dynasties. Their exclusion demonstrated the extent to which Hitler regarded the former royal families as potential rivals rather than partners in his political system.

In May 1941, Victoria Louise's father, the former German Emperor Wilhelm II, became seriously ill at his residence, Huis Doorn, in the Netherlands. He suffered from an intestinal obstruction, prompting Victoria Louise to travel to Doorn to visit him. Several of her brothers also came to see him during his illness. Although Wilhelm's condition initially improved enough for his visitors to return home, he subsequently suffered a relapse.

Victoria Louise returned to Doorn as her father's condition deteriorated. She was present at his bedside, together with his second wife, Hermine Reuss of Greiz, and his grandson Prince Louis Ferdinand of Prussia, when Wilhelm died on 4 June 1941. He was 82 years old. His death was attributed to a pulmonary embolism.

Although she had lived in Germany for many years, she had continued to correspond with her father and visit him in the Netherlands. His death took place while Europe was still at war and the Netherlands remained under German occupation. Wilhelm was buried at Huis Doorn, where he had lived since his exile following the German Revolution of 1918.

During the war, Victoria Louise and Ernest Augustus continued to live at Blankenburg Castle. The castle became the family's principal residence and remained a centre of their domestic life despite the increasing disruption caused by the conflict. Victoria Louise's sons were frequently away on military service, while other members of the extended family were serving in different parts of Europe. The family also experienced the effects of air raids, shortages and the destruction of towns and historic buildings. In her memoirs, Victoria Louise described the devastation of Brunswick and Berlin and the loss of places associated with her family's history.

The family's difficulties increased as the Nazi regime became more suspicious of members of the former aristocracy. During the final winter of the war, Victoria Louise's eldest son, Ernest Augustus, was arrested by the Gestapo at Blankenburg Castle. According to her account, police officials arrived with a warrant and took him away without initially explaining the reason for his arrest. Victoria Louise attempted to discover where he had been taken and travelled to Berlin with her son Georg Wilhelm to make enquiries. Her husband was unable to accompany them because he was recovering from a stomach operation and remained unwell.

Victoria Louise eventually obtained permission to visit Ernest Augustus at the Gestapo offices in Berlin. She described the meeting as brief and closely supervised, and recalled that her son appeared weak. The family continued to seek his release, with assistance from her brother August Wilhelm. Ernest Augustus was eventually freed and returned to Blankenburg a few days before Christmas. Victoria Louise later stated that he had been arrested after making critical remarks about Hitler's policies during a conversation and being denounced to the authorities. His arrest was a further indication of the regime's willingness to intimidate even members of prominent aristocratic families when they expressed opposition to its leadership.

Victoria Louise also described the family's concern over the fate of other relatives who had been targeted by the Nazi regime. Her cousin Prince Philipp of Hesse had been detained after being summoned to Hitler's headquarters, while his wife, Princess Mafalda of Savoy, was arrested in Italy and subsequently imprisoned at Buchenwald concentration camp. Mafalda died in August 1944 after being severely injured during an Allied air raid on the camp. These events reinforced the family's awareness of the dangers faced by relatives who fell out of favour with the Nazi leadership.

As the war approached its end, Blankenburg itself became a battlefield. The town was subjected to fighting and bombardment as Allied forces advanced through the Harz region. Victoria Louise's memoirs describe the castle being used to shelter wounded people and local residents during the fighting. She also recalled the presence of foreign labourers and prisoners who had been brought to the area during the war, some of whom sought protection at the castle as the military situation deteriorated. Her account describes the family's efforts to assist people caught in the fighting and to prevent further violence around the estate.

American forces entered Blankenburg in April 1945, and British troops subsequently arrived in the area. The family found itself in an uncertain position because Blankenburg, although temporarily occupied by American and British forces, was due to be transferred to the Soviet occupation zone. The change in occupation arrangements threatened the family's continued residence at the castle and the future of its possessions. Victoria Louise's husband and sons also became involved in efforts to prevent further fighting in the surrounding area, including attempts to persuade remaining German soldiers and armed groups to surrender rather than continue resistance.

In the final months of the war, Victoria Louise and her family faced the prospect of losing Blankenburg and their home. With assistance from the British authorities, they were able to leave the castle before the territory was transferred to Soviet control on 1 July 1945. The departure was organised on a substantial scale, with the family's furniture, personal possessions and other belongings transported westwards in British Army vehicles. The operation was later described by historian Gerd Biegel as an organised evacuation rather than an ordinary flight, reflecting the assistance provided by the British forces to the family.

The family moved to Marienburg Castle, which was situated in the British occupation zone and therefore offered a safer place of residence. Their departure marked the end of their long association with Blankenburg, where they had lived through the Nazi period and almost the entire Second World War. Victoria Louise's experiences during the conflict had included her sons' military service and subsequent removal from the armed forces, the death of her father in exile, the Gestapo arrest of her eldest son and the destruction of much of the world associated with her childhood and family history.

== Later life ==
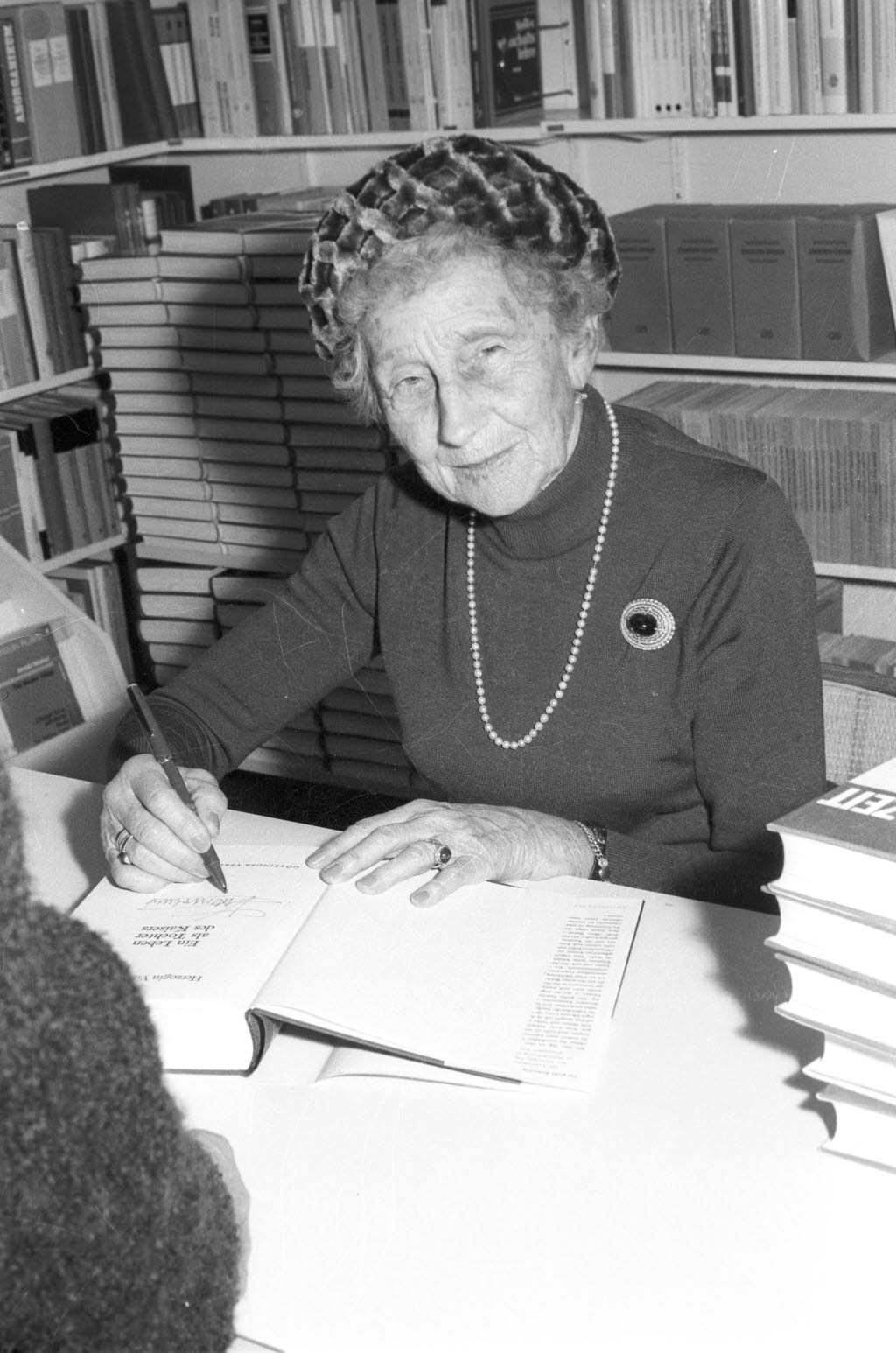
The Duchess signing her autobiography (1970)

Viktoria Luise was widowed on 30 January 1953, when her husband, Ernest Augustus, Duke of Brunswick, died at Marienburg Castle, aged 65. Following his death, she remained at Marienburg, where she continued to receive visitors and participate in public and charitable activities in Lower Saxony. Her life at the castle, however, became increasingly difficult because of disagreements with her eldest son, Ernest Augustus, who succeeded his father as head of the House of Hanover.

In 1954, her eldest son decided to turn Marienburg Castle into a museum and moved his own residence to the nearby Calenberg Estate. The decision contributed to a serious disagreement between mother and son. Although he offered her several alternative residences, Viktoria Luise did not wish to leave Marienburg on the terms proposed. Their differences also extended to her continuing public appearances and popularity in the region. Victoria Louise remained a well-known figure in Brunswick and Hanover, where she maintained connections with local organisations and continued to attend social events. The disagreement eventually resulted in her leaving Marienburg in 1956.

She subsequently moved to Brunswick, where she occupied a house made available to her through the support of a wealthy industrialist and a group of local admirers known as the Braunschweiger Freundeskreis (Brunswick Friends' Circle). She remained there for the rest of her independent life. Her move marked a significant change from her former position at Marienburg, where she had lived with her husband and maintained a household associated with the former ducal family. In Brunswick, she developed a more independent social life and continued to cultivate her public reputation.

Following her return to Brunswick, Viktoria Luise devoted considerable attention to charitable and social work. In the post-war years, she supported former prisoners of war returning to Germany from the Soviet Union and assisted refugees who had been displaced by the war. She also worked at the Friedland refugee reception camp in Lower Saxony and used her personal connections to collect money and clothing donations from Germany and abroad. Her charitable activities continued the social work she had undertaken during her earlier life as Duchess of Brunswick.

She also became involved in the Niedersächsische Kinderfreiplatzspende, a charitable initiative that provided holiday accommodation for children from working-class families. She served as its patron and helped promote opportunities for children who otherwise had limited access to holidays outside their homes. Her post-war charitable work included support for local associations, social organisations and initiatives connected with the welfare of children and refugees. She also participated in activities associated with the preservation of regional traditions and the social life of Lower Saxony.

Viktoria Luise also attended events organised by shooting clubs, equestrian associations and traditional military organisations, including groups connected with the Bundeswehr and the Federal Border Guard. She also supported local heritage activities and maintained her interest in horses and equestrian events. Her continued involvement in these organisations helped preserve her public profile long after the end of the German monarchy. She retained considerable popularity in the region, particularly among organisations associated with local traditions and the former ruling houses.

In 1972, Viktoria Luise celebrated her 80th birthday an occasion that drew press attention. The prelude to her birthday featured a torchlit procession by the Hanoverian Rifle clubs. Viktoria Luise was accompanied by her son Georg Wilhelm at a public reception at Gewandhaus, Brunswick where many people gathered to see her.

=== Writing career ===
In 1965, Victoria Louise published her autobiography, Ein Leben als Tochter des Kaisers (Life as the Emperor's Daughter), in which she recounted her childhood as the only daughter of Wilhelm II and Augusta Victoria, her upbringing within the German imperial family, her marriage to Ernest Augustus and her experiences during the end of the German Empire. The book became popular with readers interested in the former imperial family and the history of the German monarchy. It was reprinted several times, reaching its fifteenth edition by 1979.

The success of her first memoir encouraged her to publish further accounts of her life and family. Her subsequent books included Im Glanz der Krone (1966), Bilder der Kaiserzeit (1969), Vor 100 Jahren (1970), Deutschlands letzte Kaiserin (1971), a biography of her mother Augusta Victoria, and Im Strom der Zeit (1974). In 1977, she published Die Kronprinzessin, a biographical work about her sister-in-law Cecilie, the last Crown Princess of Germany. Across these publications, Victoria Louise wrote about her childhood at the imperial court, the history of her family, the German Empire, the fall of the monarchy and the lives of members of the former European royal houses.

Her memoirs attracted a substantial readership, although historians have criticised their subjective presentation of the imperial period. Her accounts tended to present the former monarchy and her family in a favourable light, and some of her interpretations have been questioned by later historical research. Her descriptions of the rise of National Socialism and her family's contacts with leading figures of the regime have also been criticised for minimising or downplaying their significance. Her books are therefore used as personal recollections of the imperial family, but require comparison with other historical evidence when assessing political events and the role of the German aristocracy.

Questions were also raised about the authorship of her books. Her publisher, Leonhard Schlüter, a politician associated with the far right, was alleged to have played a much greater role in their preparation than a conventional publisher. The extent of his contribution remains a subject of discussion. The controversy was examined by historians and commentators, including Ernst-August Roloff and Uwe Meier in their 2012 study of the duchess and her publisher.

Despite the controversy surrounding her memoirs, Victoria Louise continued publishing into her eighties. Her books brought her renewed attention beyond Lower Saxony and established her as a commercially successful author of royal and family memoirs. They also contributed to the continuing public interest in Wilhelm II, the German imperial household and the former ruling dynasties of Germany. Her writing became an important part of her public identity in the decades following her husband's death.

== Death ==
By the late 1970s, Viktoria Luise’s health had deteriorated considerably. In March 1979, she was seriously ill at her home in Brunswick, Germany. Her granddaughter, Sofía, later visited her.

Viktoria Luise continued to live in Brunswick for the remainder of her life, although her increasing frailty eventually made it necessary for her to receive more extensive medical care. In autumn 1980, she moved to the Friederikenstift hospital in Hanover. She died there on 11 December 1980, aged 88. Her death was recorded by the City of Brunswick, which noted that she had lived in the Riddagshausen district of the city since 1956 and remained closely associated with the local community until the end of her life.

Viktoria Luise’s funeral took place on 18 December 1980 at Brunswick Cathedral, a week after her death. The service attracted an exceptionally large public attendance, reflecting the popularity she had retained in the city during the 24 years she had lived there. According to the official chronicle of the City of Brunswick, more than 5,000 people attended the funeral service, both inside the cathedral and outside it. The Brunswick Palace Museum later also described the gathering as an indication of the considerable affection in which she had been held by the city's population.

Queen Sofía of Spain attended the funeral accompanied by her daughter, Infanta Elena. Several thousand local residents also gathered to pay their respects, making the funeral both a family occasion and a major public event in Brunswick.

Following the funeral service, Viktoria Luise’s coffin was transported to Hanover for burial in the family burial ground at Herrenhausen. On 18 December, she was interred beside her husband, Ernest Augustus, in front of the Royal Mausoleum in the Berggarten, within the Herrenhausen Gardens. The burial place was associated with the House of Hanover and included the tombs of earlier members of the dynasty. Her burial beside her husband reunited the couple in death after almost 28 years of widowhood.

== Publications ==
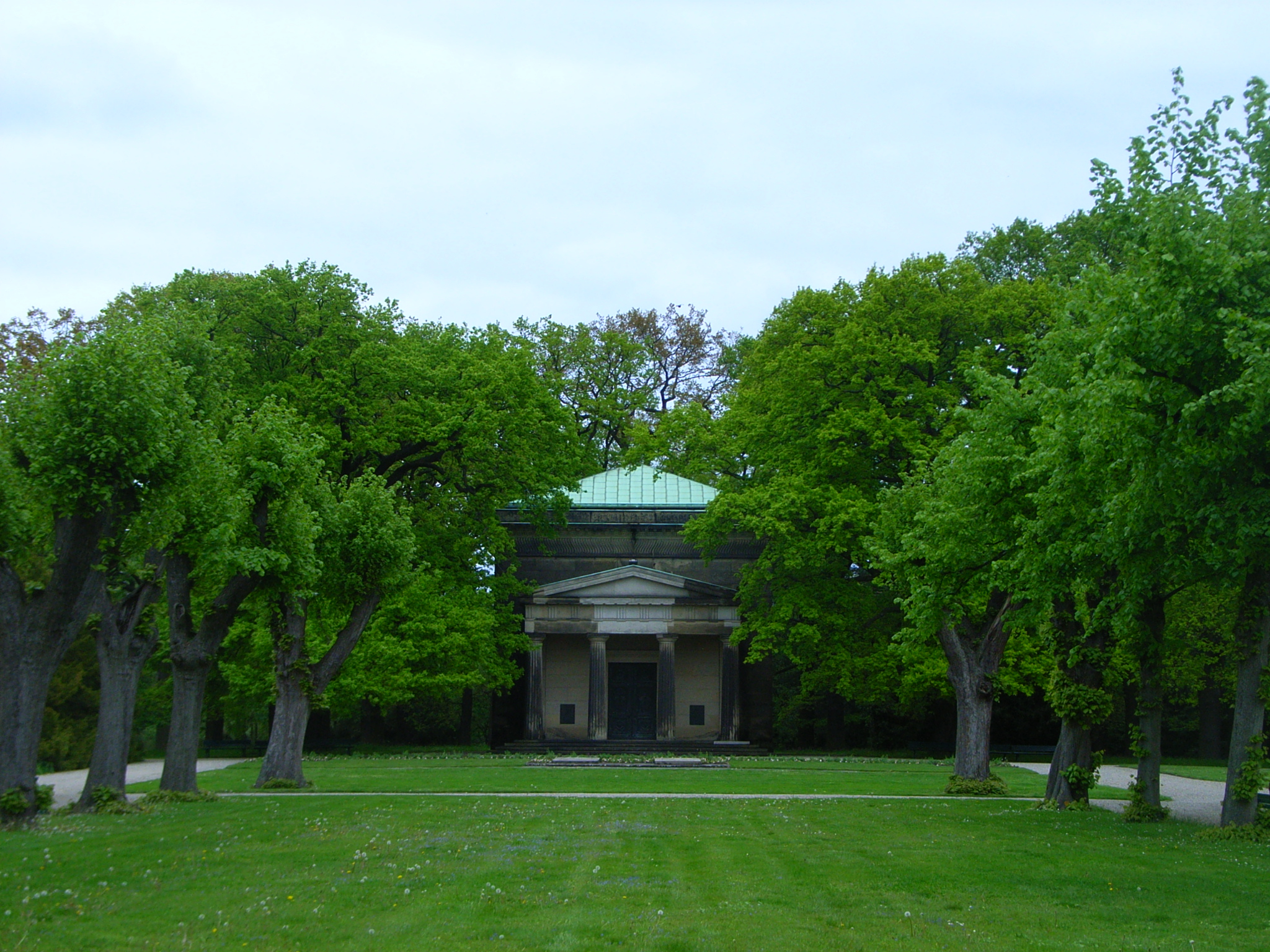
Graves of Ernst August and Victoria Louise in front of the Berggarten mausoleum in Hanover

Approximate translations of the titles into English are given in parentheses.

- Ein Leben als Tochter des Kaisers ("Life as a Daughter of the Emperor")
- Im Strom der Zeit ("In the River of Time")
- Bilder der Kaiserzeit ("Images from the Imperial Period")
- Vor 100 Jahren ("100 Years Ago")
- Die Kronprinzessin ("The Crown Princess")
- Deutschlands letzte Kaiserin ("Germany's Last Empress")

== Legacy ==
David Jones records in his prose-poem In Parenthesis a fragment of song from the Western Front – "I want Big Willie's luv-ly daughter" – implying (as Jones notes) "that the object of the British Expedition into France was to enjoy the charms of the Emperor's daughter".

A number of vessels were named after the princess:

- SMS Victoria Louise, protected cruiser launched 29 March 1897, scrapped in 1923.
- Prinzessin Victoria Luise, launched 29 June 1900; wrecked off Jamaica, 16 December 1906.
- Viktoria Luise, launched 10 January 1900, as the Deutschland; refitted and renamed Viktoria Luise, 1910; renamed Hansa 1921; sold for scrap, 1925.
- The Zeppelin LZ 11 of the Verkehrsluftschiff der Deutschen Luftschifffahrts Aktiengesellschaft (DELAG) was named Viktoria Luise.

== Honours ==
- Knight of the Order of the Black Eagle (Kingdom of Prussia)
- Dame, 1st Class, of the Order of Louise (Kingdom of Prussia)
- Dame of the Royal Order of Saint George (Hanoverian Royal Family)
- Dame Grand Cross of the Order of Saints Olga and Sophia (Kingdom of Greece)
- Dame of the Order of Queen Maria Luisa, 24 May 1913 (Spain)
- Order of the Medjidie, Special Class for Ladies (Ottoman Empire)
- Dame Grand Cordon of the Order of Charity (Ottoman Empire)
- Dame Grand Cross of the Imperial Austrian Order of Elizabeth, 1911 (Austria-Hungary)

=== Regimental commissions ===
- Regimentschefin (Regimental Chief) and Oberst à la suite (Honorary Colonel), 2. Leib-Husaren Regiment Königin Victoria von Preußen Nr. 2, c. 1909

== Issue ==
Name	Birth	Death	Notes
Prince Ernest Augustus	18 March 1914	9 December 1987 (aged 73)	married first 1951, Princess Ortrud of Schleswig-Holstein-Sonderburg-Glücksburg; had issue. married second 1981, Countess Monika zu Solms-Laubach; no issue.
Prince George William	25 March 1915	8 January 2006 (aged 90)	married 1946, Princess Sophie of Greece and Denmark; had issue.
Frederica, Queen of the Hellenes	18 April 1917	6 February 1981 (aged 63)	married 1938, Paul of Greece; had issue.
Prince Christian Oscar	1 September 1919	10 December 1981 (aged 62)	married 1963, Mireille Dutry (b. 10 January 1946); divorced 1976; had issue.
Prince Welf Henry	11 March 1923	12 July 1997 (aged 74)	married 1960, Princess Alexandra of Ysenburg and Büdingen; no issue.

== Ancestry ==
Ancestors of Princess Victoria Louise of Prussia

8. Wilhelm I, German Emperor
4. Frederick III, German Emperor
9. Princess Augusta of Saxe-Weimar-Eisenach
2. Wilhelm II, German Emperor
10. Prince Albert of Saxe-Coburg and Gotha
5. Victoria, Princess Royal
11. Victoria, Queen of the United Kingdom
1. Princess Victoria Louise of Prussia
12. Christian August II, Duke of Schleswig-Holstein-Sonderburg-Augustenburg
6. Frederick VIII of Schleswig-Holstein
13. Countess Louise Sophie Danneskiold-Samsøe
3. Princess Augusta Victoria of Schleswig-Holstein-Sonderburg-Augustenburg
14. Ernst I, Prince of Hohenlohe-Langenburg
7. Princess Adelheid of Hohenlohe-Langenburg
15. Princess Feodora of Leiningen

Princess Victoria Louise of Prussia House of Hohenzollern Born: 13 September 1892 Died: 11 December 1980
Royal titles
Vacant Title last held by Princess Marie of Baden as Duchess of Brunswick-Wolfenbüttel	Duchess consort of Brunswick; 1 November 1913 – 8 November 1918	German Revolution
