= War Merit Cross (Brunswick) =

Brunswick War Merit Cross Braunschweigisches Kriegsverdienstkreuz
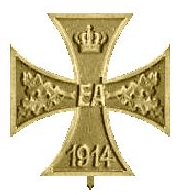
- War Merit Cross, 1st class
- Type: Military decoration
- Awarded for: Distinction in war
- Presented by: Duchy of Brunswick
- Campaign: World War I
- Status: No longer awarded
- Established: 23 October 1914
- Final award: 1918

The Brunswick War Merit Cross (German: Braunschweigisches Kriegsverdienstkreuz) also known as the Ernst-Augustkreuz, was a military decoration of the Duchy of Brunswick. The Cross was established 23 October 1914 by Ernest Augustus, Duke of Brunswick. The cross was awarded to all ranks for distinction in war. On 20 March 1918, a first class of the Cross was created in pinback form, with the existing Cross becoming the second class. This brought the Cross in line with awards of other German States like Prussia with the Iron Cross. The cross was awarded on a blue ribbon with yellow stripes for combatants and on a yellow ribbon with blue stripes for non-combatants.

The Brunswick War Merit Cross is a bronze cross pattée. At the center of the Cross on the obverse are the letters EA for Duke Ernest Augustus. On the horizontal arms of the cross are sprays of oak leaves. The top arm of the cross bears the Brunswick crown, with the date 1914 on the lower arm of the cross. On the reverse is the inscription in three lines Für, Verdienst im, Kriege (For Merit in War) on the top, horizontal and lower arms of the cross, respectively.

== Notable recipients ==
- Philipp, Landgrave of Hesse
