= Ernest Augustus, Duke of Brunswick =

Duke of Brunswick from 1913 to 1918

Ernest Augustus
- Ernest Augustus c. 1921–22

Duke of Brunswick
- Reign: 1 November 1913 – 8 November 1918
- Predecessor: William VIII
- Successor: Monarchy abolished

Head of the House of Hanover
- Pretence: 14 November 1923 – 30 January 1953
- Predecessor: Ernest Augustus, Crown Prince of Hanover
- Successor: Prince Ernest Augustus
- Born: 17 November 1887; Penzing, Vienna, Austria-Hungary
- Died: 30 January 1953 (aged 65); Marienburg Castle, Hanover, West Germany
- Burial: 1 February 1953; Berggarten Mausoleum, Hanover, West Germany
- Spouse: Princess Victoria Louise of Prussia (m. 1913)
- Issue: Ernest Augustus, Hereditary Prince of Brunswick; Prince George William; Frederica, Queen of the Hellenes; Prince Christian Oscar; Prince Welf Henry
Names
- Ernest Augustus Christian George; German: Ernst August Christian Georg
- House: Hanover
- Father: Ernest Augustus, Crown Prince of Hanover
- Mother: Princess Thyra of Denmark

Ernest Augustus (Ernest Augustus Christian George; German: Ernst August Christian Georg; 17 November 1887 – 30 January 1953) was Duke of Brunswick from 2 November 1913 to 8 November 1918. He was a grandson of George V of Hanover, thus a Prince of Hanover and a Prince of the United Kingdom. He was also a maternal grandson of Christian IX of Denmark and the son-in-law of German Emperor Wilhelm II. The Prussians had deposed King George from the Hanoverian throne in 1866, but his marriage in 1913 ended the decades-long feud between the Prussians and the Hanoverians.

== Early life ==
Ernest Augustus was born at Penzing near Vienna, the sixth and youngest child of former Crown Prince Ernest Augustus of Hanover and his wife, Princess Thyra of Denmark. His great-grandfather, Prince Ernest Augustus, Duke of Cumberland, the fifth son of George III of the United Kingdom, became king of Hanover in 1837 because Salic Law barred Queen Victoria of the United Kingdom, from inheriting the Hanoverian throne.

His father succeeded as pretender to the Hanoverian throne and as Duke of Cumberland and Teviotdale in the peerage of Great Britain in 1878. The younger Ernest Augustus became heir apparent to the Hanoverian claim and to the dukedom of Cumberland upon the deaths of his two elder brothers, George and Christian. Through his mother, he was a first cousin of Christian X of Denmark, Haakon VII of Norway, George V of the United Kingdom, Constantine I of Greece and Nicholas II of Russia.

In 1884, his paternal great-granduncle the reigning Duke of Brunswick (a male line descendant of Henry, the older brother of William, his male line ancestor) died. Since the younger branch of the House of Welf ended with him, under house rules it would have passed to Ernest Augustus's father, who immediately claimed the throne. However, the Imperial Chancellor, Otto von Bismarck, managed to get the Federal Council (Bundesrat) of the German Empire to rule that Ernest Augustus would disturb the peace of the empire if he ascended the throne of Brunswick. Bismarck did this because he had never formally renounced his claims to the kingdom of Hanover, which had been annexed to Prussia in 1866 following the end of the Austro-Prussian War (Hanover had sided with losing Austria). Instead, Prince Albrecht of Prussia became the regent of Brunswick. After Prince Albrecht's death in 1906, Ernest Augustus offered that he and his elder son, Prince George, would renounce their claims to the Duchy of Brunswick in order to allow Ernest Augustus, his only other surviving son, to take possession of the Duchy, but this option was rejected by the Bundesrat and the regency continued, this time under Duke Johann Albrecht of Mecklenburg-Schwerin, who had previously acted as regent for his nephew in Mecklenburg.

== Marriage and accession to the duchy of Brunswick ==
Photograph

When Ernest Augustus's older brother George died in an automobile accident on 20 May 1912, the German Emperor, Wilhelm II, sent a message of condolence to their father. In response to this friendly gesture, the duke sent his only surviving son, Ernest Augustus, to Berlin to thank the Emperor for his message. Ernest Augustus and Wilhelm II were third cousins through George III of the United Kingdom. In Berlin, Ernest Augustus met and fell in love with the emperor's only daughter, Princess Victoria Louise of Prussia.

On 24 May 1913, Ernest Augustus and Victoria Louise, third cousins once removed through descent from George III's sons King Ernest Augustus of Hanover and Edward, Duke of Kent, were married to each other. This marriage ended the decades-long rift between the Houses of Hohenzollern and Hanover. The wedding of Prince Ernest Augustus and Princess Victoria Louise was also the last great gathering of European sovereigns before the outbreak of the Great War, as recalled by Constantine II of Greece, a grandson of the married couple, in 2003. In addition to the German Emperor and Empress and the Duke and Duchess of Cumberland, King George V and Queen Mary of the United Kingdom and Tsar Nicholas II attended. Upon the announcement of his betrothal to Princess Victoria Louise in February 1913, Ernest Augustus swore allegiance to the German Empire and accepted a commission as a cavalry captain and company commander in the Zieten–Hussars, a Prussian Army regiment in which his grandfather (George V) and great-grandfather (Ernest Augustus) had been colonels. Two imprisoned British spies, Captain Stewart and Captain Trench, were pardoned and released by the German Emperor as a wedding present to the United Kingdom. George V of the United Kingdom had given consent to the marriage on 17 March 1913, as required by the Royal Marriages Act.

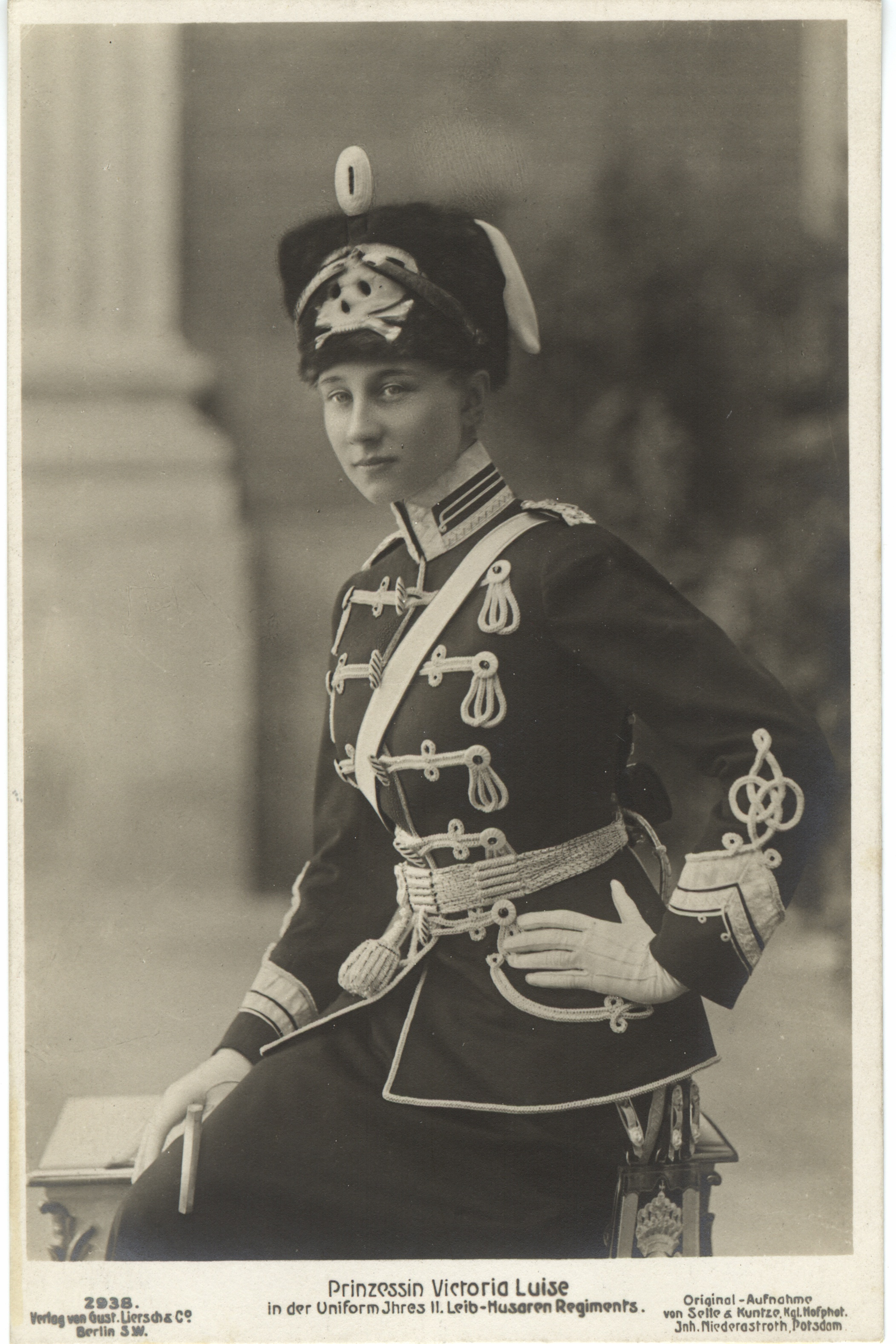
Victoria Louise in 1909, as Honorary Colonel of the II. Prussian Life Hussars Regiment

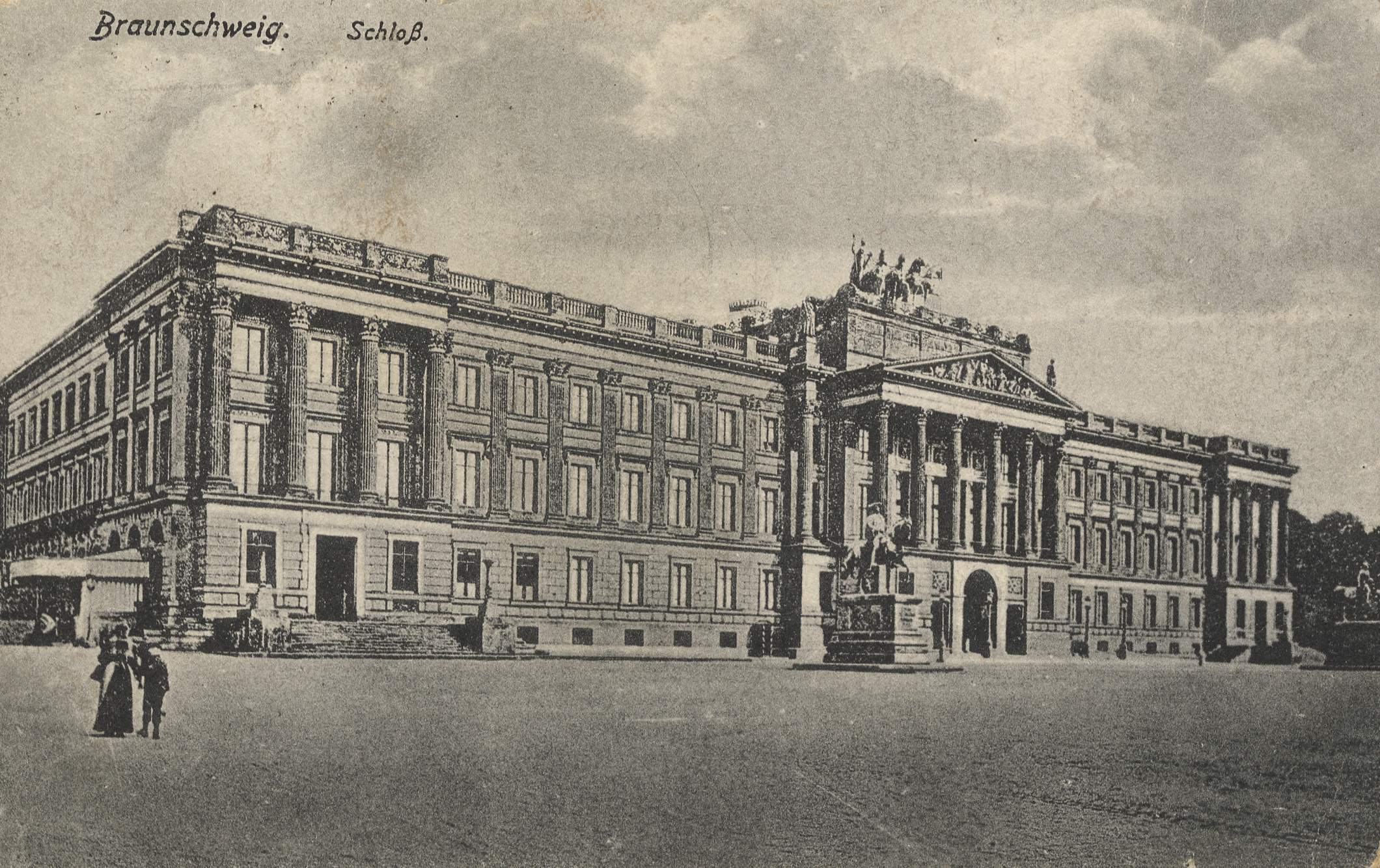
Brunswick Palace

On 27 October 1913, the Duke of Cumberland formally renounced his claims to the duchy of Brunswick in favor of his surviving son. The following day, the Federal Council voted to allow Ernest Augustus to become the reigning Duke of Brunswick. The new Duke of Brunswick formally took possession of his duchy on 1 November. He received a promotion to colonel in the Prussian Zieten Hussars. The new duke and duchess of Brunswick moved into Brunswick Palace in the capital of Brunswick and began their family with the birth of their eldest son, Prince Ernest Augustus, less than a year after their wedding.

During the First World War, Ernest Augustus rose to the rank of major-general.

== Abdication and later life ==
In 1917, the British dukedom of Ernest Augustus's father, and his own title as a Prince of the United Kingdom of Great Britain and Ireland, were removed by the Titles Deprivation Act 1917, which took effect in 1919, as a result of the Duke's service in the German army during the war. On 8 November 1918, Ernest Augustus was forced to abdicate his throne, as were all the other German kings, grand dukes, dukes, and princes during the German Revolution of 1918–1919. Thus, when his father died in 1923, Ernest Augustus did not succeed to his father's title of Duke of Cumberland. For the next thirty years, Ernest Augustus remained as head of the House of Hanover, living in retirement on his various estates, mainly Blankenburg Castle in Germany and Cumberland Castle in Gmunden, Austria. He also owned Marienburg Castle near Hanover, although rarely ever living there until moving his family there in 1945.

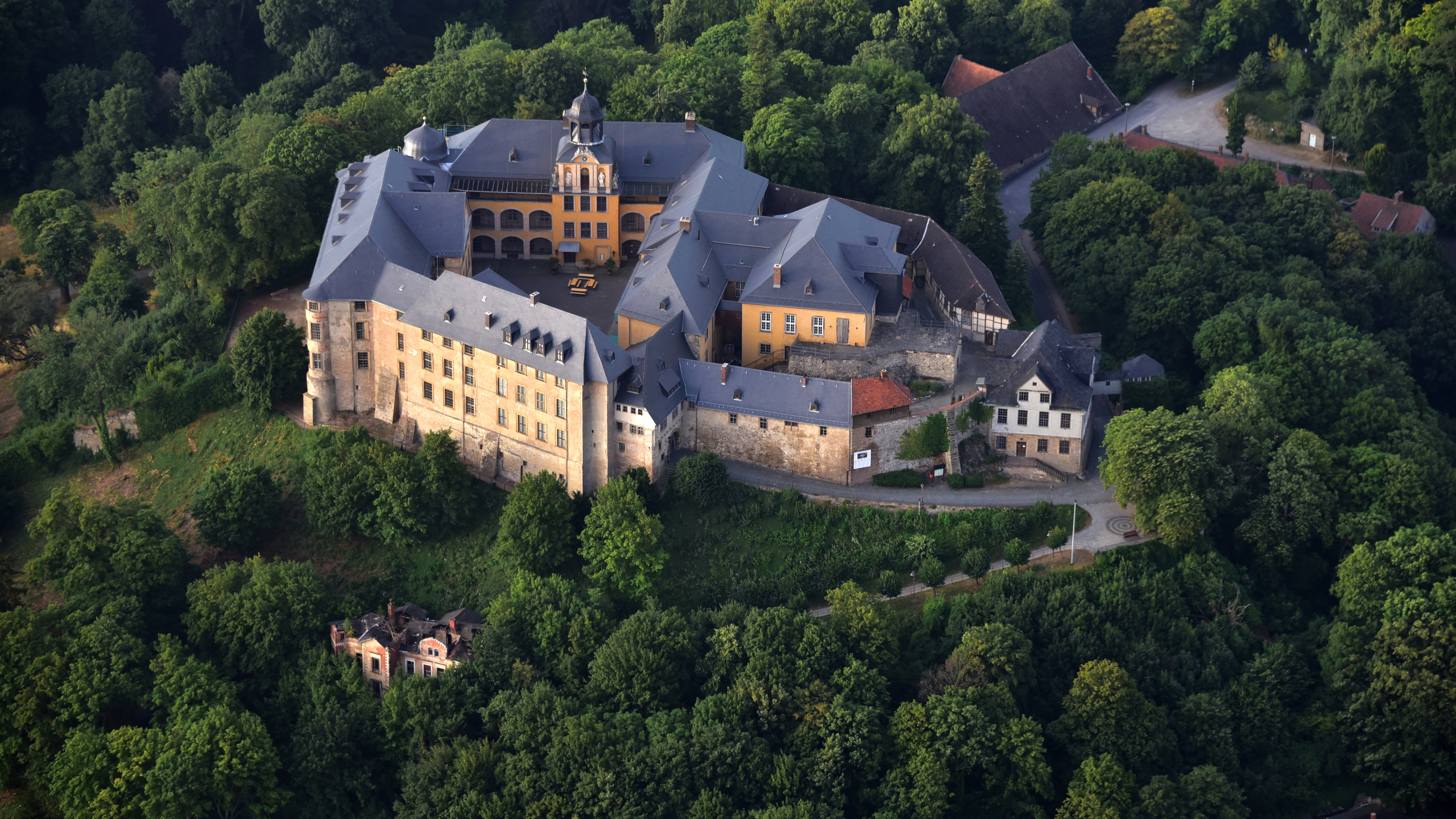
Blankenburg Castle near Brunswick

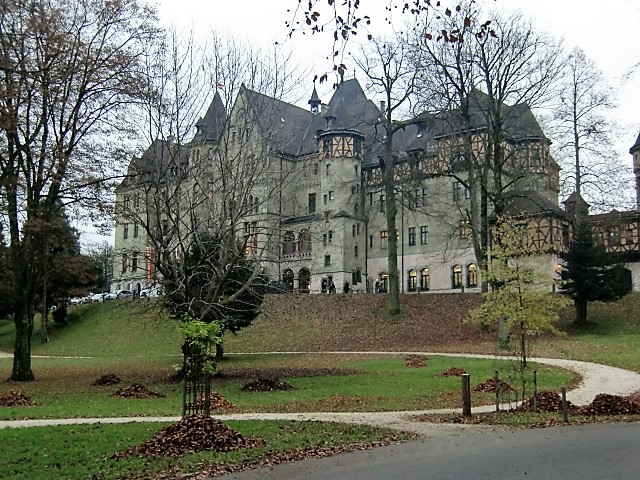
Cumberland Castle, Gmunden, Austria

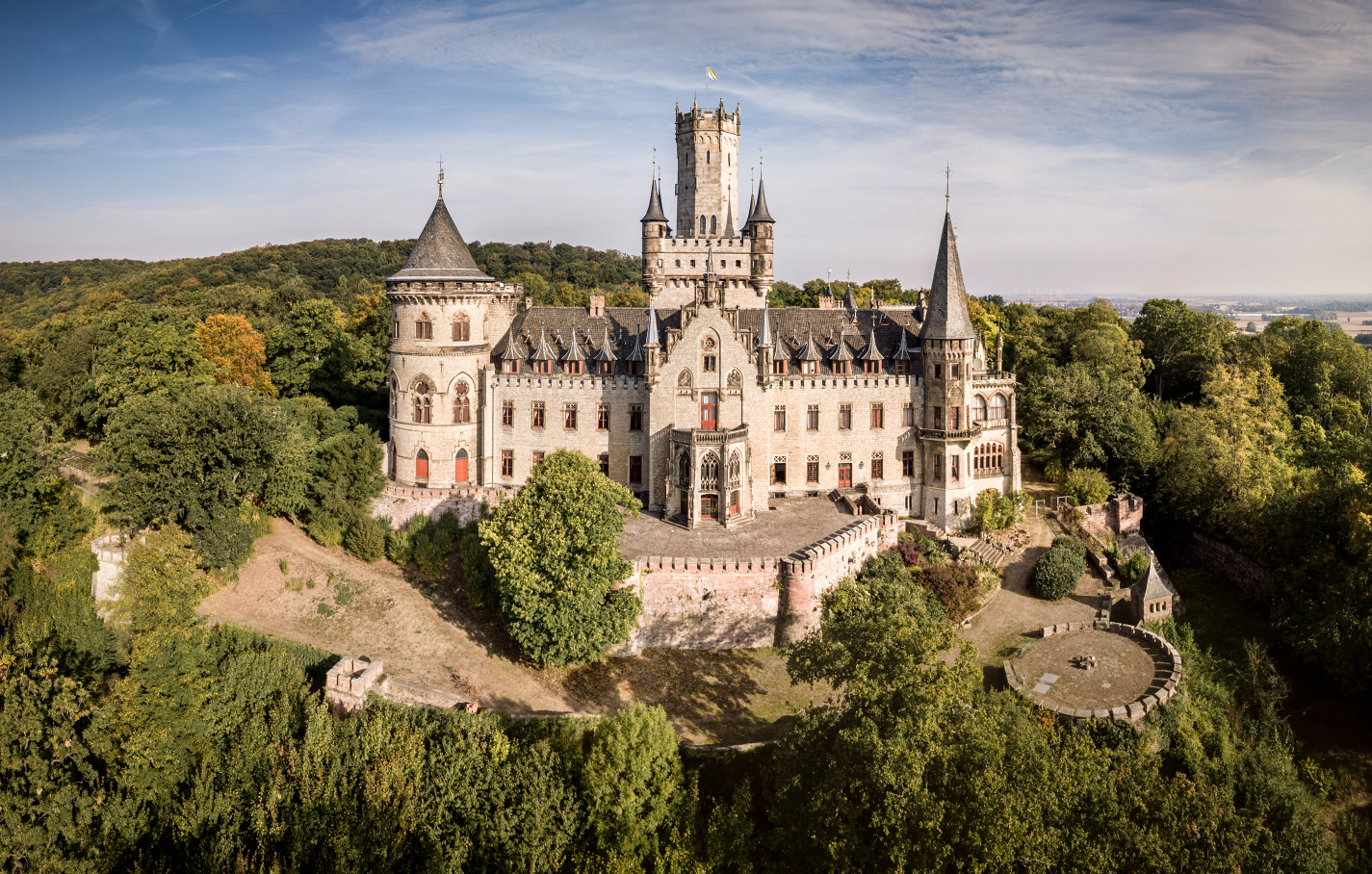
Marienburg Castle near Hanover

While Ernest Augustus never officially joined the Nazi Party, he donated funds and was close to several leaders. As a former British prince, Ernest Augustus, as well as Victoria Louise, desired a rapprochement between the United Kingdom and Germany. Ostensibly desiring to pursue an alliance with the UK, in the mid-1930s, Adolf Hitler took advantage of their sentiment by asking the couple to arrange a match between their daughter Princess Frederica and the Prince of Wales. The Duke and Duchess of Brunswick refused, believing that the age difference was too great. After his abdication in 1936, Edward VIII and his wife visited "the Cumberlands" at Cumberland Castle in Gmunden, Austria. In 1938 Princess Frederica married Prince Paul of Greece, brother and heir-presumptive of King George II of Greece.

By the time the Second World War ended in Europe in April 1945, he and his family were staying at Blankenburg. A few days before Blankenburg was handed over to the Red Army by British and U.S. forces in late 1945, to become part of East Germany, the family was able to move to Marienburg Castle, at the time located in the British Occupation Zone, with all their furniture, transported by British Army trucks, on the order of King George VI.

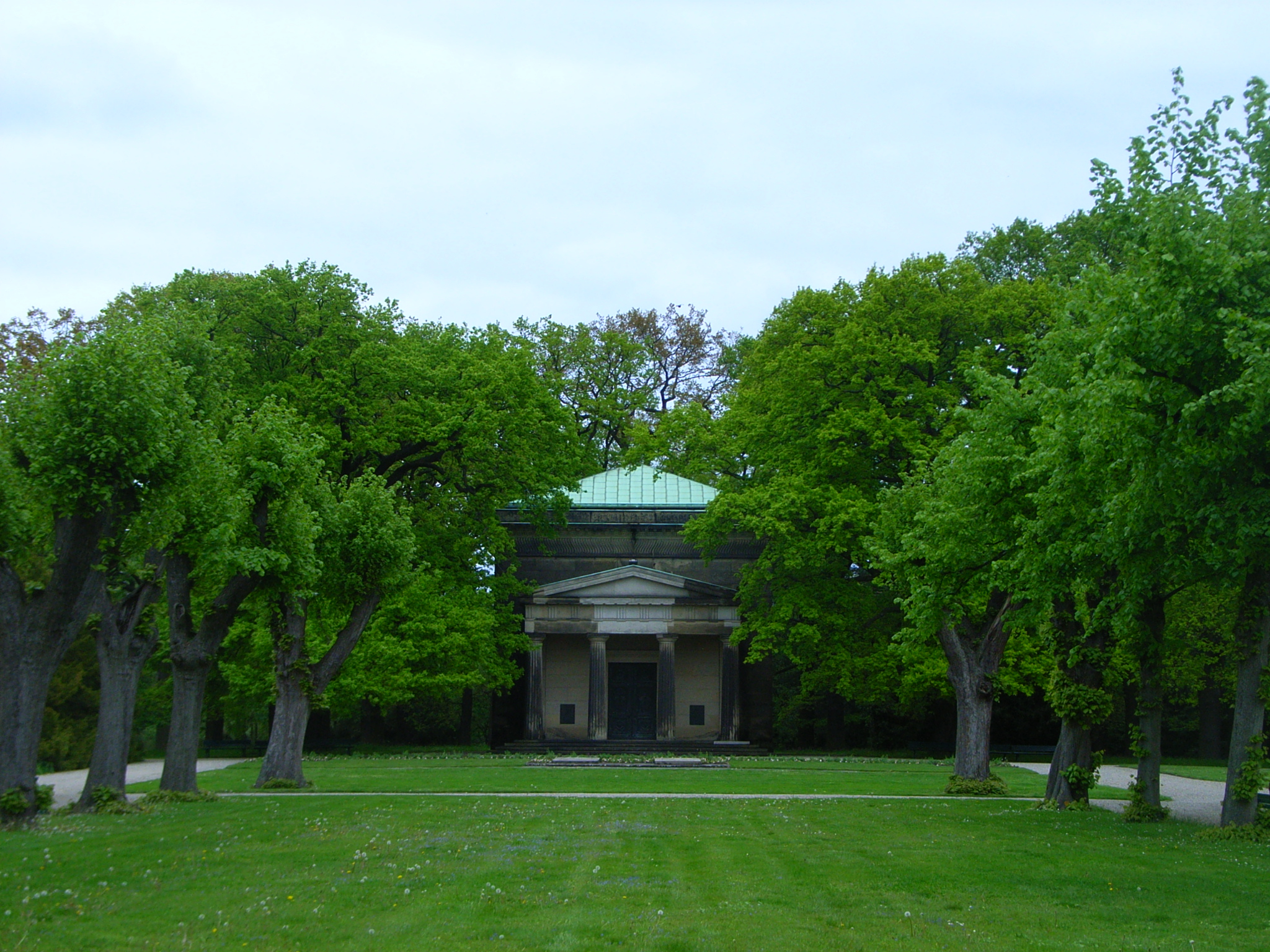
Mausoleum at Herrenhausen Gardens in Hanover

Ernest Augustus lived to see his daughter Frederica become a queen consort in 1947 when her husband Paul became King of the Hellenes. Ernest Augustus died at Marienburg Castle in 1953. He was interred, later to be joined by the remains of his wife, in front of the Royal Mausoleum in the Berggarten at Herrenhausen Gardens in Hanover, which is the burial chapel of King Ernest Augustus of Hanover and his wife.

== Issue ==
The Duke and Duchess of Brunswick had five children:

- Ernest Augustus, Hereditary Prince of Brunswick (18 March 1914 – 9 December 1987); married (1) 1951, Princess Ortrud of Schleswig-Holstein-Sonderburg-Glücksburg (19 December 1925 – 6 February 1980), and had issue; and (2) 1981, Countess Monika zu Solms-Laubach (8 August 1929 – 4 June 2015).
- Prince George William (25 March 1915 – 8 January 2006); married 1946 Princess Sophie of Greece and Denmark (26 June 1914 – 24 November 2001), and had issue.
- Princess Frederica (18 April 1917 – 6 February 1981); married 1938 Paul of Greece (14 December 1901 – 6 March 1964), and had issue. They were the grandparents of Felipe VI of Spain.
- Prince Christian Oscar Ernest Augustus William Victor George Henry of Hanover (1 September 1919 – 10 December 1981); married 1963 (divorced 1976) Mireille Dutry (b. 10 January 1946), and had issue.
  - Princess Caroline Louise (3 May 1965)
  - Princess Mireille (3 June 1971)
- Prince Guelph Henry Ernest Augustus George Christian Berthold Frederick William Louis Ferdinand of Hanover (11 March 1923 – 12 July 1997); married 1960 Princess Alexandra of Ysenburg and Büdingen (23 October 1937 – 1 June 2015), and had no issue.

== Honours ==
- Grand Cross of Henry the Lion, ca. 1903; Sovereign Grand Master, 1 November 1913 (Duchy of Brunswick)
- Knight of St. George, 29 August 1903; Sovereign Grand Master, 14 November 1923 (Hanoverian Royal Family)
- Grand Cross of the Royal Guelphic Order, ca. 1903; Sovereign Grand Master, 14 November 1923 (Hanoverian Royal Family)
- Grand Cross of the Order of Ernst August, ca. 1903; Sovereign Grand Master, 14 November 1923 (Hanoverian Royal Family)
- Knight of the Elephant, 15 November 1905 (Denmark)
- Commemorative Medal for the Golden Wedding of King Christian IX and Queen Louise (Denmark)
- King Christian IX Centenary Medal (Denmark)
- Knight of St. Hubert, 1909 (Kingdom of Bavaria)
- Knight of the Black Eagle, 13 February 1913 (German Empire)
- Grand Cross of the Red Eagle, ca. February 1913 (German Empire)
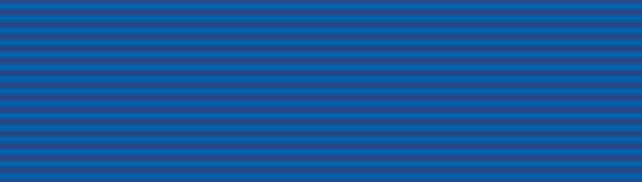
- Knight of St. Andrew, 24 May 1913 (Russian Empire)
- War Merit Cross, 2nd Class, ca. 1914 (Duchy of Brunswick)
- War Merit Cross, 1st Class, ca. 1914 (Duchy of Brunswick)
- Iron Cross, 2nd Class, ca. 1914 (German Empire)
- Iron Cross, 1st Class, ca. 1914 (German Empire)
- Grand Cross of St. Stephen, ca. 1914 (Austria-Hungary)
- Grand Cross of the Redeemer, 9 January 1938 (Kingdom of Greece)

== Ancestry ==
Ancestors of Ernest Augustus, Duke of Brunswick

8. Ernest Augustus, King of Hanover
4. George V of Hanover
9. Duchess Frederica of Mecklenburg-Strelitz
2. Ernest Augustus, Crown Prince of Hanover
10. Joseph, Duke of Saxe-Altenburg
5. Princess Marie of Saxe-Altenburg
11. Duchess Amelia of Württemberg
1. Ernest Augustus, Duke of Brunswick
12. Friedrich Wilhelm, Duke of Schleswig-Holstein-Sonderburg-Glücksburg
6. Christian IX of Denmark
13. Princess Louise Caroline of Hesse-Kassel
3. Princess Thyra of Denmark
14. Prince William of Hesse-Kassel
7. Princess Louise of Hesse-Kassel
15. Princess Charlotte of Denmark

== Sources ==
- Succession Laws in the House of Braunschweig, by François R. Velde
- Emmerson, Charles (2013). 1913: The World before the Great War (2013 ed.). Random House. ISBN 9781448137329. - Total pages: 544
- MacDonogh, Giles (2007). After the Reich: The Brutal History of the Allied Occupation. New York: Basic Books. p. 75. ISBN 978-0465003389. "victoria louise."
- Petropoulos, Jonathan (2006). Royals and the Reich: The Princes von Hessen in Nazi Germany. New York: Oxford University Press. ISBN 0195339274.
- Riotte, Torsten (2011). "Hanoverian Exile and Prussian Governance: King George V of Hanover and His Successor in Austria, 1866–1913". In Mansel, Philip; Riotte, Torsten (eds.). Monarchy and Exile: The Politics of Legitimacy from Marie de Médicis to Wilhelm II. Basingstoke, Hampshire: Palgrave Macmillan. ISBN 978-0-230-24905-9.
- Viktoria Luise, Herzogin zu Braunschweig und Lüneburg (1977). The Kaiser's Daughter: Memoirs of H. R. H. Viktoria Luise, Duchess of Brunswick and Lüneburg, Princess of Prussia. Prentice-Hall. ISBN 978-0-13-514653-8.

Ernest Augustus, Duke of Brunswick House of Hanover Cadet branch of the House of Welf Born: 17 November 1887 Died: 30 January 1953
Regnal titles
Vacant Ernest Augustus unrecognized Title last held by William	Duke of Brunswick; 2 November 1913 – 8 November 1918	Vacant German Revolution
Titles in pretence
Loss of title Free State of Brunswick	— TITULAR — Duke of Brunswick; 8 November 1918 – 30 January 1953; Reason for succession failure: German Revolution	Succeeded by Prince Ernest Augustus of Hanover (born 1914)
Preceded by Ernest Augustus, Crown Prince of Hanover	— TITULAR — King of Hanover; 14 November 1923 – 30 January 1953; Reason for succession failure: Austro-Prussian War	Succeeded by Prince Ernest Augustus of Hanover (born 1914)
Preceded by Ernest Augustus, Crown Prince of Hanover	— TITULAR — Duke of Cumberland and Teviotdale; 14 November 1923 – 30 January 1953; Reason for succession failure: Titles Deprivation Act 1917	Succeeded by Prince Ernest Augustus of Hanover (born 1914)
