= Hanoverian princesses by marriage =

List of princesses by marriage from George III to the Kingdom of Hanover

This is a list of Hanoverian princesses by marriage from the accession of George III to the throne of the Kingdom of Hanover in 1814.

== List of princesses by marriage since 1814 ==
Princess	Date of birth	Date of death	Husband	Notes
Caroline, Queen of Hanover	17 May 1768	7 August 1821	George IV, King of Hanover	Title held from her father-in-law's ascension to her husband's ascension in 1820
Frederica, Duchess of York and Albany	7 May 1767	6 August 1820	Frederick, Duke of York and Albany	Title held from her father-in-law's ascension to her death
Adelaide, Queen of Hanover	13 August 1792	2 December 1849	William I, King of Hanover	Title held from her marriage in 1818 to her husband's ascension in 1830
Victoria, Duchess of Kent and Strathearn	17 August 1786	16 March 1861	Edward, Duke of Kent and Strathearn	Title held from her marriage in 1818 to her death
Frederica, Queen of Hanover	3 March 1778	29 June 1841	Ernest Augustus, King of Hanover	Title held from her marriage in 1815 to her husband's ascension in 1837
Augusta, Duchess of Cambridge	25 July 1797	6 April 1889	Adolphus, Duke of Cambridge	Title held from her marriage in 1818 to her death
Marie, Queen of Hanover	14 April 1818	9 January 1907	George V, King of Hanover	Title held from her marriage in 1843 to her husband's ascension in 1851
Thyra, Crown Princess of Hanover	29 September 1853	26 February 1933	Ernest Augustus, Crown Prince of Hanover	Title held from her marriage in 1878 to her death
Victoria Louise, Duchess of Brunswick and Princess of Hanover	13 September 1892	11 December 1980	Ernest Augustus, Duke of Brunswick and Prince of Hanover	Title held from her marriage in 1913 to her death
Ortrud, Princess of Hanover	19 December 1925	6 February 1980	Ernest Augustus, Hereditary Prince of Brunswick and Prince of Hanover	Title held from her marriage in 1951 to her death
Monika, Princess of Hanover	8 August 1929	4 June 2015	Ernest Augustus, Prince of Hanover (1914–1987)	Title held from her marriage in 1981
Princess Sophie of Hanover	26 June 1914	3 November 2001	Prince George William	Title held from her marriage in 1946 to her death
Mirelle, Prinzessin von Hannover	10 January 1946		Prince Christian Oscar of Hanover	Name held from her marriage in 1963
Princess Alexandra of Hanover	23 October 1937	1 June 2015	Prince Welf Henry of Hanover	Title held from her marriage in 1960
Wibke Prinzessin von Hannover	26 November 1948		Prince Welf Ernst of Hanover	Name held from her marriage in 1969
Princess Viktoria of Hanover	6 March 1951		Prince Georg of Hanover	Title held from her marriage in 1973
Chantal, Princess of Hanover	2 June 1955		Prince Ernst August of Hanover (born 1954)	Title held from her marriage in 1981 to her divorce in 1997
Caroline, Princess of Hanover	23 January 1957		Prince Ernst August of Hanover (born 1954)	Title held from her marriage in 1999
Princess Isabelle of Hanover	12 February 1962	28 November 1988	Prince Ludwig Rudolph of Hanover	Title held from her marriage in 1987 to her death
Princess Thyra of Hanover	14 August 1973		Prince Heinrich Julius of Hanover	Title held from her marriage in 1999
Ekaterina, Hereditary Princess of Hanover	1 July 1986		Ernst August, Hereditary Prince of Hanover	Title held from her marriage in 2017
Princess Alessandra of Hanover	21 March 1989		Prince Christian of Hanover	Title held from her marriage in 2018.
