= Alessandra de Osma =

Peruvian attorney and member of the House of Hanover (born 1988)

Alessandra
- Princess Christian of Hanover
- Born: Alessandra Lisette de Osma Foy; 21 March 1988 (age 38); Lima, Peru
- Spouse: Prince Christian of Hanover (m. 2018)
- Issue: 3
- House: Hanover (by marriage)
- Father: Felipe de Osma Berckemeyer
- Mother: Elizabeth Foy Vásquez
- Occupation: Attorney, designer, model

Princess Christian of Hanover (née Alessandra Lisette de Osma Foy; born 21 March 1988) is a Peruvian attorney, handbag designer, and former model. She is a member of the former Hanoverian royal family through her marriage to Prince Christian of Hanover.

== Early life and family ==
Alessandra de Osma was born in San Borja, Lima, Peru. She is the daughter of Felipe Juan Luis de Osma Berckemeyer, Executive and Central Commercial Manager of Hermes Transportes Blindados, a Peruvian cash management firm, and his wife Elizabeth María Foy Vásquez, a former model. The Osma family has ties to the Spanish nobility through her distant cousin, José Domingo de Osma Wakonigg, who currently holds the hereditary title of Count of Vistaflorida.

== Career ==
When de Osma was sixteen she signed with Ford Models in New York City. She has modeled for Missoni and Bottega Veneta. She studied law at the University of Lima and has a master's degree in fashion and business management from the University of Navarra. In 2018 she launched her own fashion brand Moi & Sass with Moira Laporta.

== Personal life ==
De Osma met Prince Christian of Hanover in 2005 when she served as his tour guide when he was vacationing in Peru. They started dating in 2011. The couple became engaged in April 2017. They married in a civil service at the Chelsea and Westminster register office in London. They married religiously in a Catholic ceremony at the Basilica of San Pedro and held a reception at the Club Nacional in Lima, Peru, on 16 March 2018. The groom's younger half-sister, Princess Alexandra, served as her bridesmaid. De Osma wore the Hanover floral tiara, which had previously been worn by Caroline, Princess of Hanover. Wedding guests at the religious ceremony included Princess Beatrice and Princess Eugenie of York, Princess Maria-Olympia of Greece and Denmark, Count Nikolai von Bismarck, and Kate Moss. The wedding celebrations lasted for three days.

The couple lives in Madrid, near the sports and social club Puerta de Hierro. Alessandra gave birth to twins on 7 July 2020 at Quirón Clinic in Pozuelo de Alarcón, Madrid. Their names are Nicolas and Sofia. Their third child, a daughter, was born on 16 February 2024. Her name, Alexia, was announced on 3 March 2024 on Alessandra's verified Instagram account.
