= Princess Alexandra of Hanover (born 1999) =

Monegasque figure skater and princess

Alexandra
- Born: 20 July 1999 (age 27); Vöcklabruck, Upper Austria, Austria
Names
- Alexandra Charlotte Ulrike Maryam Virginia
- House: Hanover
- Father: Ernst August, Prince of Hanover
- Mother: Princess Caroline of Monaco
- Occupation: Writer, influencer

Princess Alexandra of Hanover (Alexandra Charlotte Ulrike Maryam Virginia; born 20 July 1999) is a Monegasque writer, member of the House of Hanover, and the fourth child of Princess Caroline of Monaco and the third of Ernst August, Prince of Hanover.

== Family ==
Alexandra was born on 20 July 1999 in Vöcklabruck, Upper Austria. She was christened on 19 September that year by Horst Hirschler, Landesbischof of the Evangelical-Lutheran Church of Hanover, in a ceremony at her father's hunting lodge Auerbach, near Grünau im Almtal, Upper Austria. Her godparents are her paternal aunt Alexandra, Princess of Leiningen, maternal half-sister Charlotte Casiraghi, Ulrike Ulmschneider, Maryam Sachs, Virginia Gallico, George Condo, and Eric Maier. She was named after each of her godmothers.

She has half-siblings from her parents' previous marriages. From her father's previous marriage, she has two half-brothers, Hereditary Prince Ernst August and Prince Christian of Hanover. From her mother's previous marriage, she has two half-brothers, Andrea and Pierre Casiraghi, and one half-sister, Charlotte Casiraghi. Her maternal uncle, Albert II, is the sovereign of Monaco. She is a granddaughter of American actress Grace Kelly. On her father's side, she is a descendant of Queen Victoria of the United Kingdom, Wilhelm II, German Emperor, and King Christian IX of Denmark. She is also a first cousin once removed of Queen Sofía of Spain and King Constantine II of Greece, and a second cousin of King Felipe VI of Spain.

Alexandra is the only one of Princess Caroline's four children who bears any royal style or title. While she is formally styled as Her Royal Highness Princess Alexandra of Hanover in Monaco, she is afforded the style and title out of courtesy elsewhere. She is 14th in the line of succession to the Monegasque throne. Through her father, she was in the line of succession to the British throne until 2018, when she was confirmed into the Catholic Church.

== Early life, education, and career ==
Initially enrolled in public school in Le Mée-sur-Seine, near Paris, she finished her primary and secondary schooling Monaco. She initially studied political science and philosophy at New York University. She completed her Master of Arts in History and Literature at Reid Hall, the site of Columbia University in Paris.

As of 2026, she is based part-time in Los Angeles. Since 2025, she has been writing travel and literary articles for the bilingual Revue Passager magazine as well as her own Substack newsletter, as declared in the profile of her official Instagram account.

== Figure skating career ==
Alexandra began skating when she was ten years old after receiving ice skates as a Christmas present. When she was 11 years old, she competed at a competition in Toulon, France. At the age of 12, she competed in the "Skate 7" class at the 10th Figure Skating Championship in Monaco, finishing in second place. She was awarded the cup of the Monegasque Federation of Skating.

Alexandra represented Monaco in figure skating at the 2015 European Youth Olympic Festival in Austria and in two competitive events during the 2015–16 season at the ISU Junior Grand Prix of Figure Skating.

=== Career results ===
JGP: Junior Grand Prix

=== Programs ===
Season	Short program	Free skating	Exhibition
2015–2016	Moon River by Henry Mancini	My Fair Lady by Frederick Loewe	

=== Competitive highlights ===
International: Junior
Event	14–15	15–16
JGP Spain		33rd
JGP Austria		35th
EYOF	29th	

=== Detailed results ===
2015–16 season
Date	Event	Level	SP	FS	Total
1–4 October 2015	2015 JGP Spain	Junior	34; 12.86	33; 29.78	33; 42.64
9–13 September 2015	2015 JGP Austria	Junior	35; 14.02	35; 30.53	35; 44.55
2014–15 season
Date	Event	Level	SP	FS	Total
26–28 January 2015	2015 EYOF	Junior	29; 11.72	– –	29; 11.72

== Personal life ==
When Alexandra was 11 years old, German entertainment magazine Freizeit Revue published an article about and photographs of her competing at a figure skating competition in France. The article also covered her mother's dating life and other personal matters. Alexandra sought injunctive relief and sued the magazine, taking the case to the German Federal Court of Justice.

In March 2015, Alexandra attended Monaco's Rose Ball for the first time. However, it was not until the next year's ball that she entered the event with her family, thus gaining the notice of the society press.

In October 2018, Alexandra converted to Catholicism, thereby renouncing her distant place in the line of succession to the British throne.

On 11 September 2026, Alexandra announced her engagement to Ben-Sylvester Strautmann, her boyfriend of ten years. Strautmann is a basketball player who has played for Monaco men's national basketball team.

Princess Alexandra of Hanover (born 1999) House of Hanover Cadet branch of the House of Welf Born: 20 July 1999
Lines of succession
Preceded by Balthazar Rassam	Succession to the Monegasque throne 13th in line	Followed by Princess Stéphanie of Monaco
