= Lists of princesses =

A list of princesses may refer to:

== People ==
- List of princesses of Condé
- List of princesses of Greece
- List of princesses by marriage of Greece
- Hanoverian princess by marriage
- List of princesses of Liechtenstein
- List of princesses of Orange
- List of princesses of Serbia
- List of princesses of Soubise
- List of princesses of Transylvania

== Fiction and media ==
- List of fictional princesses
