= Ernst August von Hannover (born 1954) =

Head of the House of Hanover

Head of the House of Hanover
- Tenure: 9 December 1987 – present
- Predecessor: Prince Ernest Augustus
- Heir apparent: Prince Ernst August
- Born: 26 February 1954 (age 72); Hanover, Lower Saxony, West Germany
- Spouse: Chantal Hochuli (m. 1981; div. 1997) Princess Caroline of Monaco (m. 1999)
- Issue: Prince Ernst August; Prince Christian; Princess Alexandra
Names
- Ernst August Albert Paul Otto Rupprecht Oskar Berthold Friedrich-Ferdinand Christian-Ludwig Prinz von Hannover Herzog zu Braunschweig und Lüneburg Königlicher Prinz von Großbritannien und Irland
- House: Hanover
- Father: Ernest Augustus of Hanover
- Mother: Princess Ortrud of Schleswig-Holstein-Sonderburg-Glücksburg

Ernst August von Hannover (German: Ernst August Albert Paul Otto Rupprecht Oskar Berthold Friedrich-Ferdinand Christian-Ludwig Prinz von Hannover Herzog zu Braunschweig und Lüneburg Königlicher Prinz von Großbritannien und Irland, lit. 'Ernest Augustus Albert Paul Otto Rupert Oscar Berthold Frederick-Ferdinand Christian-Louis, Prince of Hanover, Duke of Brunswick and Lüneburg, Royal Prince of Great Britain and Ireland'; born 26 February 1954) is the head of the House of Hanover. As the husband of Princess Caroline of Monaco, he is the brother-in-law of Albert II, Prince of Monaco.

== Background and education ==
Ernst August was born in Hanover, the eldest son of Prince Ernest Augustus of Hanover (1914–1987), the former Hereditary Prince of Brunswick and his first wife, Princess Ortrud of Schleswig-Holstein-Sonderburg-Glücksburg (1925–1980). He was christened Ernst August Albert Paul Otto Rupprecht Oskar Berthold Friedrich-Ferdinand Christian-Ludwig. As the senior male-line descendant of George III of the United Kingdom, Ernst August is head of the House of Hanover. He is a first cousin of Queen Sofía of Spain and King Constantine II of Greece.

He left secondary school at the age of 15 to work on a farm, but returned to education later to study at the Royal Agricultural College in England and the University of Guelph in Canada.

== Ancestry and heritage ==
The hereditary Dukedom of Cumberland and Teviotdale and the Earldom of Armagh, borne in 1917 by his paternal great-grandfather, were suspended under the Titles Deprivation Act 1917. However, the title Royal Prince of Great Britain and Ireland had been entered into the family's German passports, together with the German titles, in 1914. After the German Revolution of 1918–19, with the abolition of the privileges of nobility, such titles survived only as part of the legal surname. The result is that the British princely title is still part of the family's last name in their German passports, while it is no longer mentioned in their British documents. Ernst August continues to claim the style, "Royal Prince of Great Britain and Ireland".

Ernst August also holds British citizenship. His father was recognised as a British subject under the Sophia Naturalization Act 1705 in the House of Lords case Attorney-General v. Prince Ernest Augustus of Hanover. Because foreign royal titles cannot appear in a British passport, his father was registered as Ernest Augustus Guelph, with the style His Royal Highness. His children, including Ernst August, inherited British nationality under this name.

== Marriage and family ==
=== First marriage ===
By a 24 August 1981 declaration issued by his father as the Head of House, pursuant to Chapter 3, §§ 3 and 5 of the House laws of 1836, Ernst August was authorised to marry dynastically, and first married Chantal Hochuli (born 2 June 1955 in Zürich), civilly in Pattensen on 28 August 1981 and religiously on 30 August 1981. Hochuli was the daughter and heiress of a Swiss German architect and property developer, Johann Gustav "Hans" Hochuli (14 March 1912 in Switzerland – ?), and his German wife Rosmarie Lembeck (8 April 1921, in Essen, Rhine, Prussia, Germany – 12 December 2011). They have two sons, Prince Ernst August (born 19 July 1983) and Prince Christian (born 1 June 1985). Ernst August and Chantal Hochuli divorced in London on 23 October 1997.

In 1988, Ernst August unsuccessfully claimed custody of his infant nephew Otto Heinrich, son of his younger brother, Prince Ludwig Rudolph of Hanover. The infant's mother, Countess Isabella von Thurn und Valsássina-Como-Vercelli, died of a cocaine overdose on 28 November 1988. Ludwig Rudolph placed a call to his brother in London, imploring him to take care of the couple's 10-month-old son, and shortly afterwards died by suicide. Custody of Otto Heinrich was eventually awarded, contrary to the expressed wishes of Ludwig Rudolph as the surviving parent and Ernst August's legal efforts, to the child's maternal grandparents, Count Ariprand (1925–1996) and Countess Maria von Thurn und Valsassina-Como-Vercelli (born 1929), to be raised at their family seat, Bleiburg Castle in southern Austria.

=== Second marriage ===
Ernst August married secondly, civilly in Monaco on 23 January 1999, Princess Caroline of Monaco, who was at the time expecting their daughter, Princess Alexandra (born 20 July 1999). As he was descended from George II of Great Britain in the male line, Ernst August sought and received permission to marry pursuant to the British Royal Marriages Act 1772, which would not be repealed until the Succession to the Crown Act 2013 took effect on 26 March 2015. Similarly the Monégasque court officially notified the government of France of Caroline's marriage to Ernst August, receiving assurance that there was no objection in compliance with the (since defunct) Franco-Monegasque Treaty of 1918. Moreover, in order for Caroline to retain her claim to the throne of Monaco and to transmit succession rights to future offspring, the couple were also obliged to obtain the approval of yet a third nation, in the form of official consent to the marriage of Caroline's father, Prince Rainier III, as the sovereign of Monaco.

After their marriage, Ernst August and Caroline moved to Le Mée-sur-Seine, France, where they had purchased an 18th-century manor house from their friend Karl Lagerfeld. In 2009, it was reported that Caroline had separated from Ernst August and returned to live in Monaco.

== Controversies ==
=== Assault on journalist ===
In 1999, Ernst August was accused of assaulting a journalist with an umbrella. He agreed to pay a fine in a settlement.

=== Turkish Pavilion ===
Ernst August was photographed urinating on the Turkish Pavilion at the Expo 2000 event in Hanover, causing a diplomatic incident and a complaint from the Turkish embassy accusing him of insulting the Turkish people. He successfully sued those who published (Bild-Zeitung) the photograph for invasion of privacy, obtaining an award of €9,900.

=== Assault charge ===
In 2000, Ernst August was involved in a dispute with a German man, Joseph Brunnlehner, on the island of Lamu in Kenya. Brunnlehner was the operator of a disco, and Ernst August allegedly assaulted him with a knuckleduster, upset about the noise coming from the disco.

In 2004, he was convicted in a German court of aggravated assault and causing grievous bodily harm. (Although he was not charged in Kenya, German law allows charges in a German court against a German citizen for possible criminal offences committed outside Germany.)

In 2008, he successfully applied for a retrial of the case on the basis of false evidence. His lawyers publicly stated that he has never owned a knuckleduster nor held one in his hand. The retrial was held in 2009. During retrial, he was convicted of battery in 2010; this verdict was upheld in 2011 by the Higher Regional Court of Celle and became final.

=== Family property dispute ===
In 2004, Ernst August had signed over his German property to his elder son, including Marienburg Castle, the agricultural estate of Calenberg Castle, the "Princely House" at Herrenhausen Gardens in Hanover and some forests near Blankenburg Castle (Harz) which he had repurchased in former East Germany after the German reunification of 1990. At the time, Ernst August's wealth was estimated as high as US$250 million. Since then, the younger Ernst August has taken over many representative tasks on behalf of his father. The latter remained in charge of the Austrian family assets.

In 2013, however, Ernst August was removed from the chairmanship of a family foundation based in Liechtenstein, the Duke of Cumberland Foundation, which holds the properties near Gmunden in Austria, the Hanovers' main residence in exile after 1866 when their Kingdom of Hanover was annexed by Prussia. Instead, the younger Ernst August was put in charge, reportedly for negligence on part of his father, at the initiative of the foundation's trustee Prince Michael of Liechtenstein. The foundation manages vast forests, a game park, a hunting lodge, the Queen's Villa and other property.

In 2017, Ernst August filed legal action to recover his chairmanship, and he intends to revoke the bestowal of his German property. Due to this dispute over family assets, he also declared his intention to withhold consent for his son's marriage to Ekaterina Malysheva, which he did not attend.

=== Assault on police ===
In 2020, under the influence of alcohol and medication, Ernst August injured a police officer at his hunting lodge in Austria. Five days later, he threatened another police officer with a baseball bat. In September 2020, he was arrested on charges of threatening employees. He later received a ten-month suspended jail sentence from an Austrian court, was required to move to a different residence, and obtain psychological counselling.

== Health ==
On 3 April 2005, Ernst August was admitted to hospital with acute pancreatitis. The next day, he fell into a deep coma, two days before the death of his father-in-law, Rainier III, Prince of Monaco. On 8 April 2005, hospital officials reported that he was no longer in a coma but remained in intensive care. A report the same day on BBC World described his condition as "serious but not irreversible." After his release he was subsequently seen in public with his wife. In an interview he admitted at the time that his health crisis was caused by his hyperactive lifestyle and problems with alcohol.

His health deteriorated in subsequent years. He was hospitalised again in 2011, 2017 and 2018 for problems related to alcohol. In February 2019 he had another emergency surgery for pancreatitis. One week later, it was reported that he was suffering from throat cancer. In July 2020, he was taken to the psychiatric unit of a hospital after calling the police for immediate help, which was followed by a physical fight between him and the police upon their arrival.

== Titles and arms ==
In Germany, the legal privileges of royalty and nobility were abolished in 1919; thereafter, for legal purposes, hereditary titles form part of the name only.

=== Arms and monograms ===
Arms of Prince Ernst and Princess Caroline of Hanover	Cypher of Prince Ernst and Princess Caroline
