= House of Hanover =

European dynasty of German origin

- Arms of the House of Hanover

- Royal Standard of Hanover
- Parent family: Bonifaci → Obertenghi → Este → Welf
- Country: Kingdom of Great Britain; Kingdom of Ireland; United Kingdom of Great Britain and Ireland; Kingdom of Hanover; Electorate of Brunswick-Lüneburg; Anglo-Corsican Kingdom
- Etymology: Hanover
- Founded: 1634; 392 years ago
- Founder: George, Duke of Brunswick-Lüneburg
- Current head: Ernst August, Prince of Hanover
- Titles: List: King and Queen of the United Kingdom of Great Britain and Ireland; Empress of India; King of Great Britain; King of Ireland; King of France (claimed); King of Hanover; Elector of Brunswick-Lüneburg; Arch-Treasurer of the Holy Roman Empire; Duke of Brunswick-Lüneburg; Duke of Brunswick; Duchess of Modena; Duchess of Brunswick-Lüneburg; Grand Duchess of Mecklenburg-Schwerin; Holy Roman Empress; Princess of Orange; Lord of Mann
- Deposition: Hanover: 1866 – George V of Hanover lost the territory to Prussia in the Austro-Prussian War; Brunswick: 1918 – Ernest Augustus of Brunswick forced to abdicate after German defeat in World War I
- Cadet branches: Illegitimate branches: FitzClarence (extinct)

The House of Hanover (German: Haus Hannover German pronunciation: [haʊ̯s haˈnoːfɐ]) is a German royal house with roots tracing back to the 17th century. Its members, known as Hanoverians, ruled Hanover, Great Britain, Ireland, and the British Empire at various times during the 17th to 20th centuries. Originating as a cadet branch of the House of Welf (also "Guelf" or "Guelph") in 1635, also known then as the House of Brunswick-Lüneburg, the Hanoverians ascended to prominence with Hanover's elevation to an Electorate of the Holy Roman Empire in 1692. In 1714 George I, prince-elector of Hanover and a descendant of King James VI and I, assumed the throne of Great Britain and Ireland, marking the beginning of Hanoverian rule over the British Empire. At the end of this line, Queen Victoria's death in 1901, the throne of the United Kingdom passed to her eldest son Edward VII, a member of the House of Saxe-Coburg and Gotha, through his father Albert, Prince Consort. The last reigning members of the House of Hanover lost the Duchy of Brunswick in 1918 when Germany became a republic and abolished royalty and nobility.

The formal name of the house was the "House of Brunswick-Lüneburg, Hanover line". The senior line of Brunswick-Lüneburg, which ruled Brunswick-Wolfenbüttel, became extinct in 1884. The House of Hanover is now the only surviving branch of the House of Welf, which is the senior branch of the House of Este. The current head of the House of Hanover is Ernst August, Prince of Hanover.

== History ==
=== Dukes and Electors of Brunswick-Lüneburg ===
George, Duke of Brunswick-Lüneburg was the first member of the House of Hanover. When the Duchy of Brunswick-Lüneburg was divided in 1635, George inherited the Principality of Calenberg and moved his residence to Hanover. His son, Christian Louis, inherited the Principality of Lüneburg from George's brother. Calenberg and Lüneburg were then shared between George's sons until united in 1705 under his grandson, also called George, who subsequently became George I of Great Britain. All members held the title of Duke of Brunswick-Lüneburg.

- George, Duke of Brunswick-Lüneburg, first member of the House of Hanover.
- Christian Louis, 1st son of Duke George, Prince of Calenberg (1641–1648) and Prince of Lüneburg (1648–1665). He relinquished Calenburg when he became Prince of Lüneburg.
- George William, 2nd son of Duke George, Prince of Calenberg (1648–1665) and Prince of Lüneburg (1665–1705). He relinquished Calenburg when he became Prince of Lüneburg on the death of his brother, Christian Louis.
- John Frederick, 3rd son of Duke George, Prince of Calenberg (1665–1679).
- Ernest Augustus, 4th son of Duke George, Prince of Calenberg (1679–1698). He became Prince of Calenberg on the death of his brother John Frederick. He was elevated to prince-elector of the Holy Roman Empire in 1692. Ernest Augustus's wife, Sophia of the Palatinate, was declared heiress of the throne of England by the Act of Settlement of 1701, which decreed Roman Catholics could not accede to the throne. Sophia was at that time the senior eligible Protestant descendant of James I of England.
- George Louis, son of Duke Ernest Augustus and Sophia, became Elector and Prince of Calenberg in 1698 and Prince of Lüneburg when his uncle George William died in 1705. He inherited his mother's claim to the throne of Great Britain when she died in 1714.

=== Monarchs of Great Britain, Ireland, and Hanover ===
Monarchs of Great Britain, Ireland, and Hanover

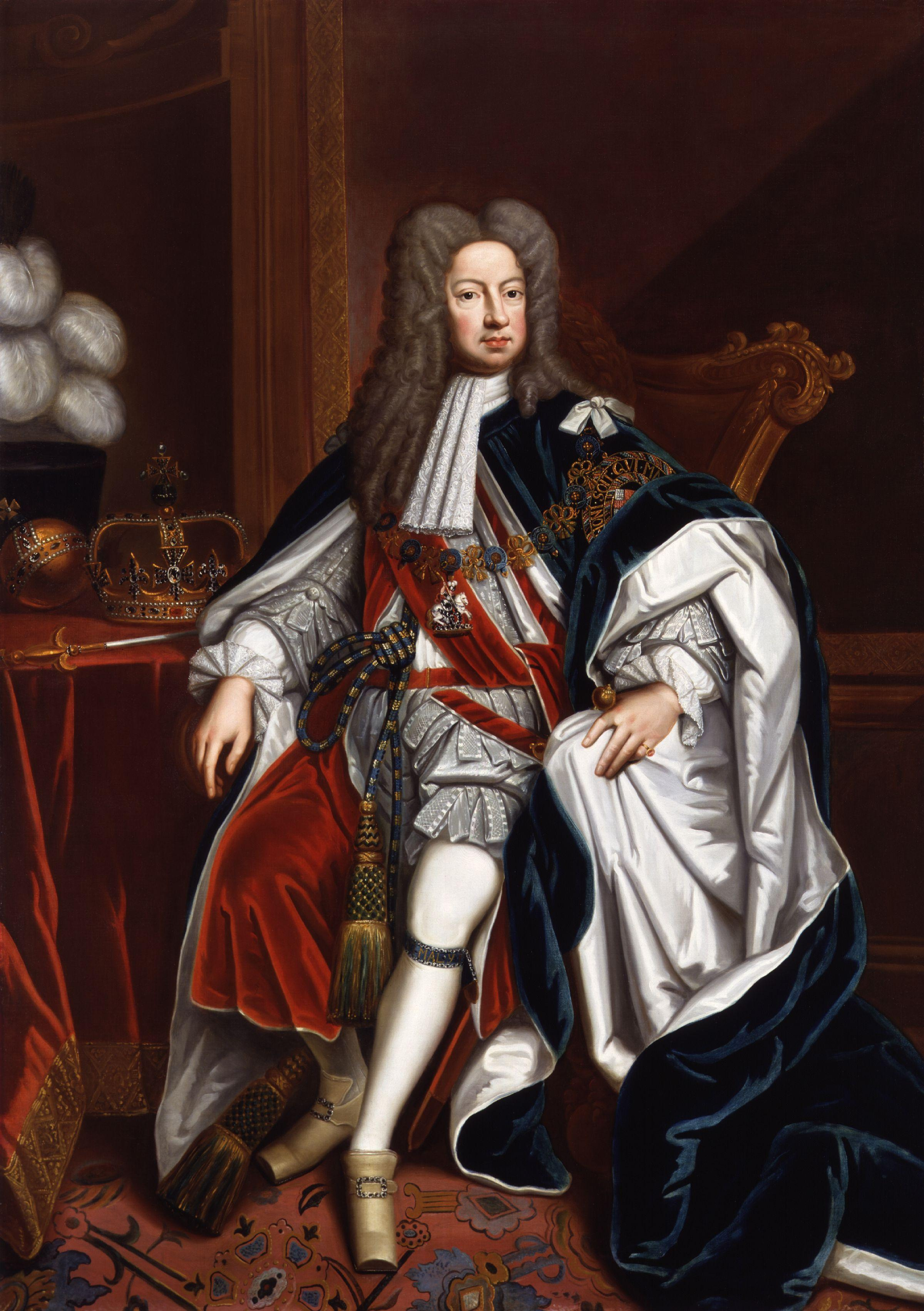
George I (1714–1727)

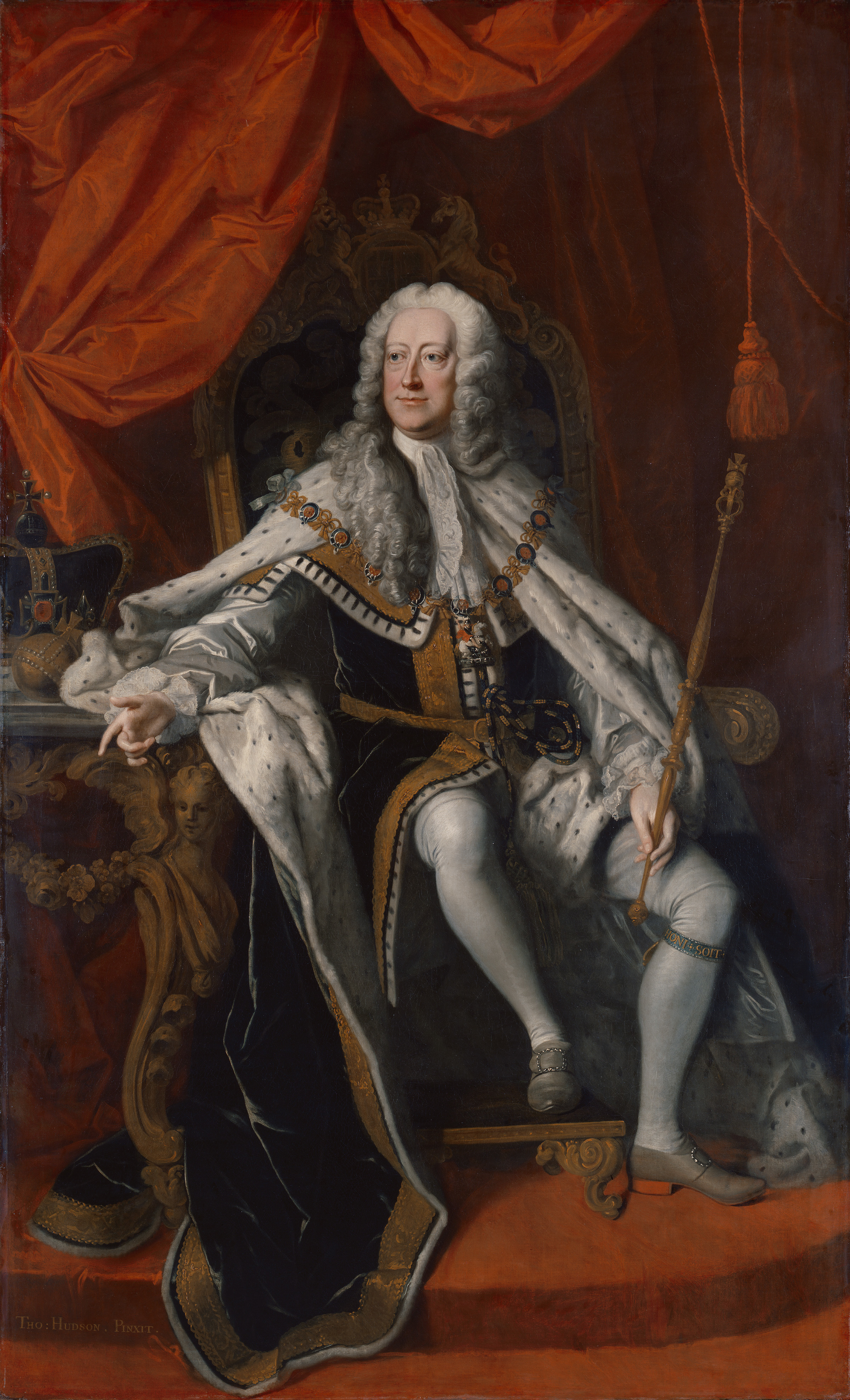
George II (1727–1760)

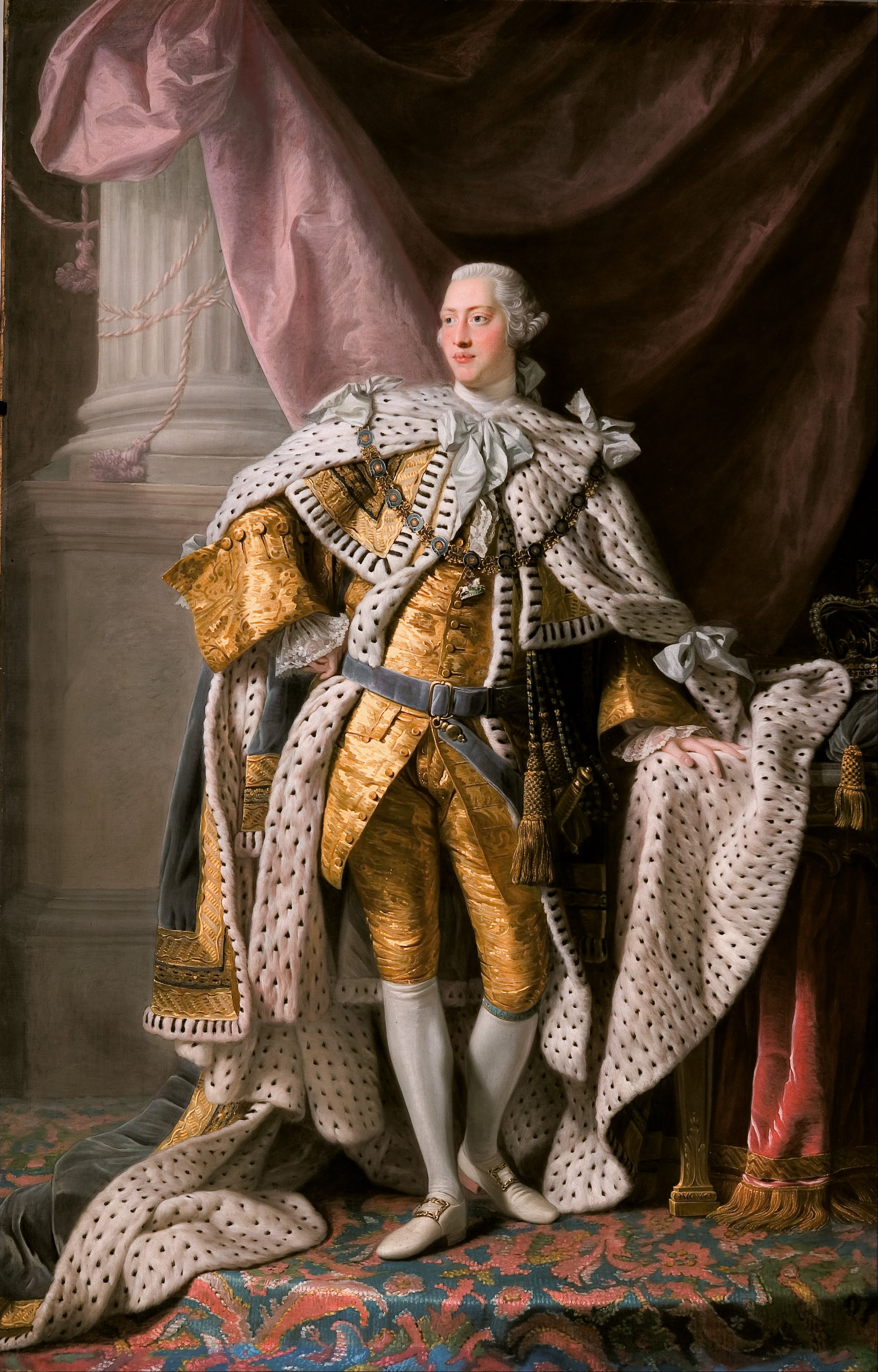
George III (1760–1820)

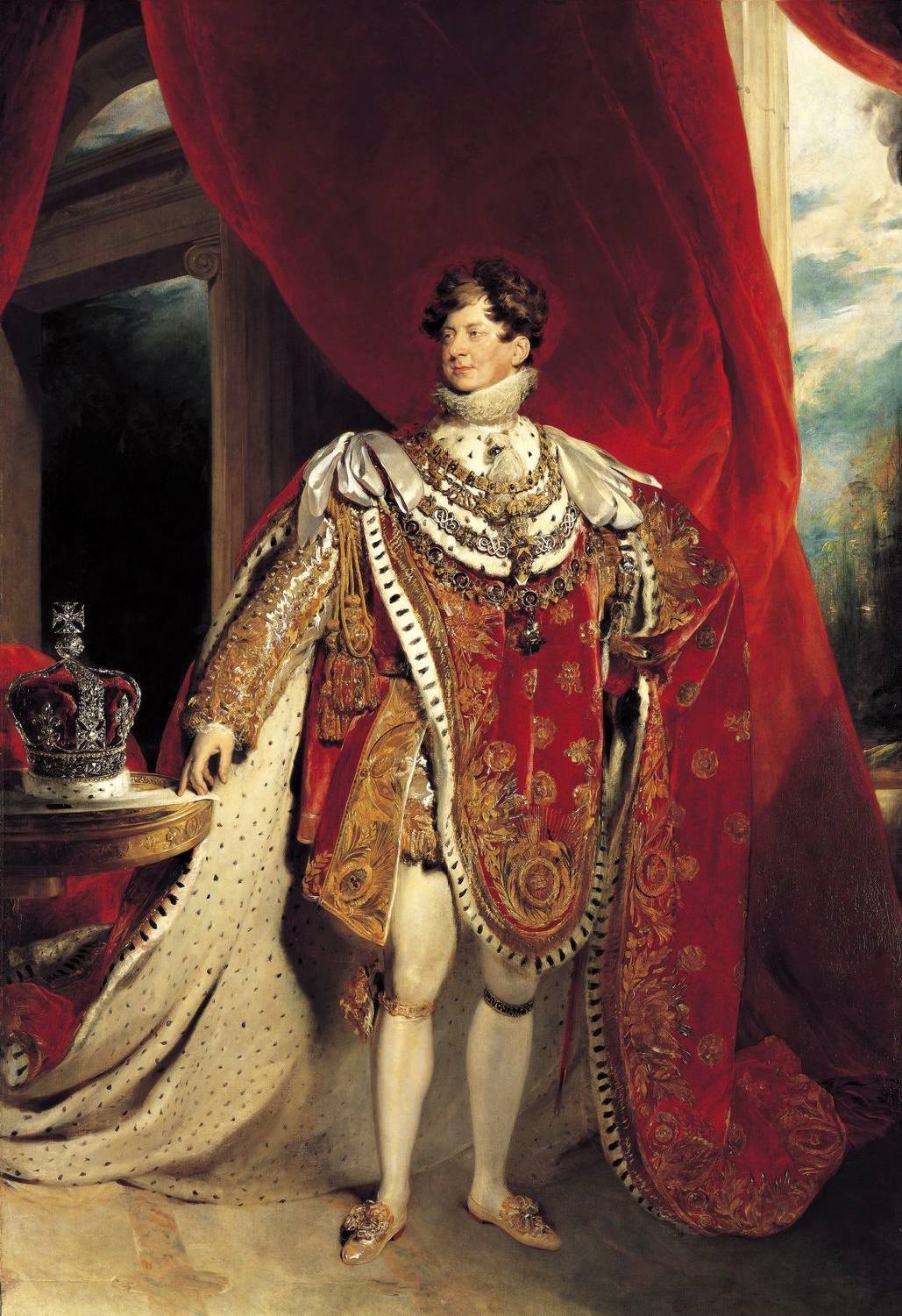
George IV (1820–1830)

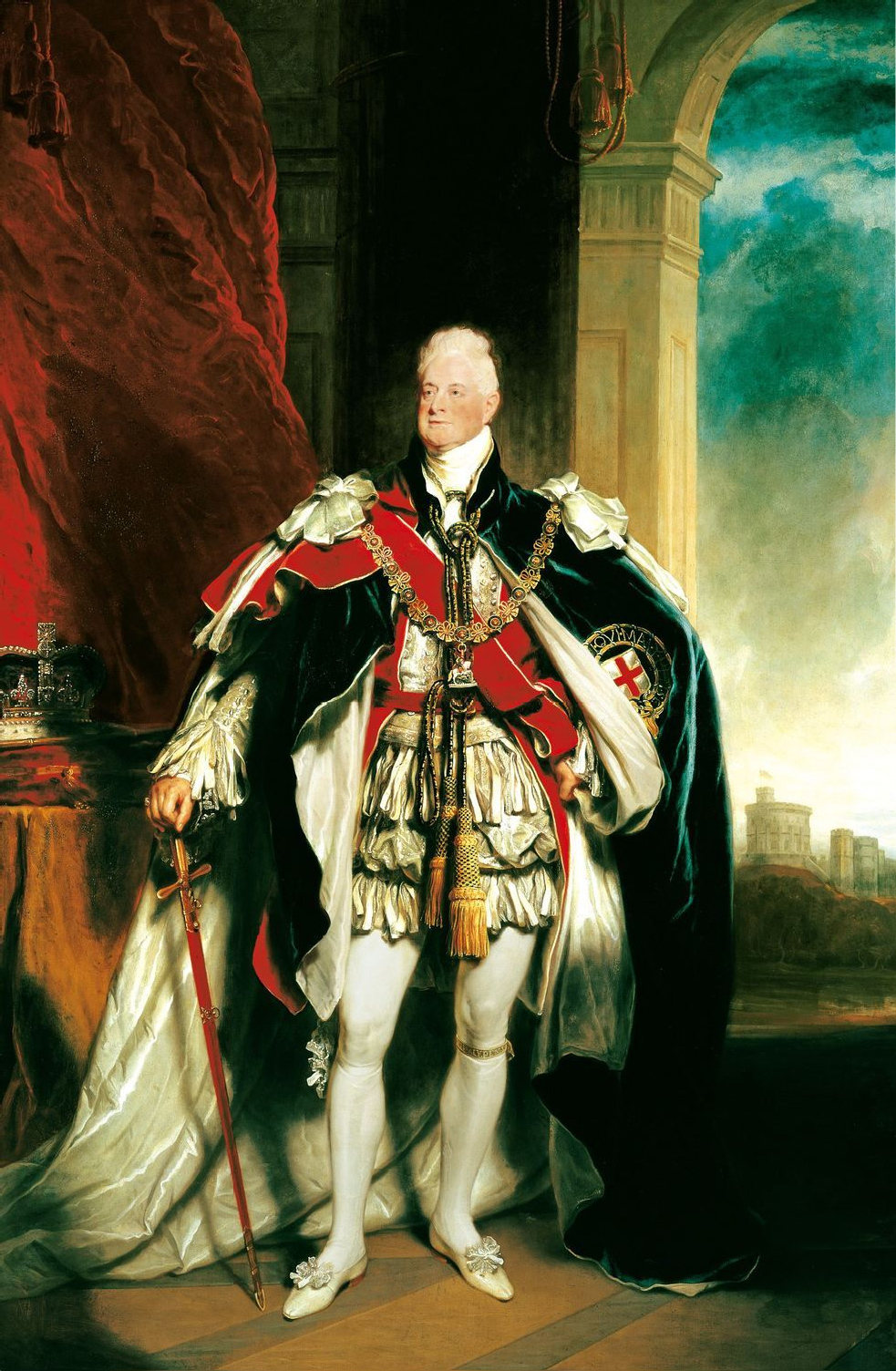
William IV (1830–1837)

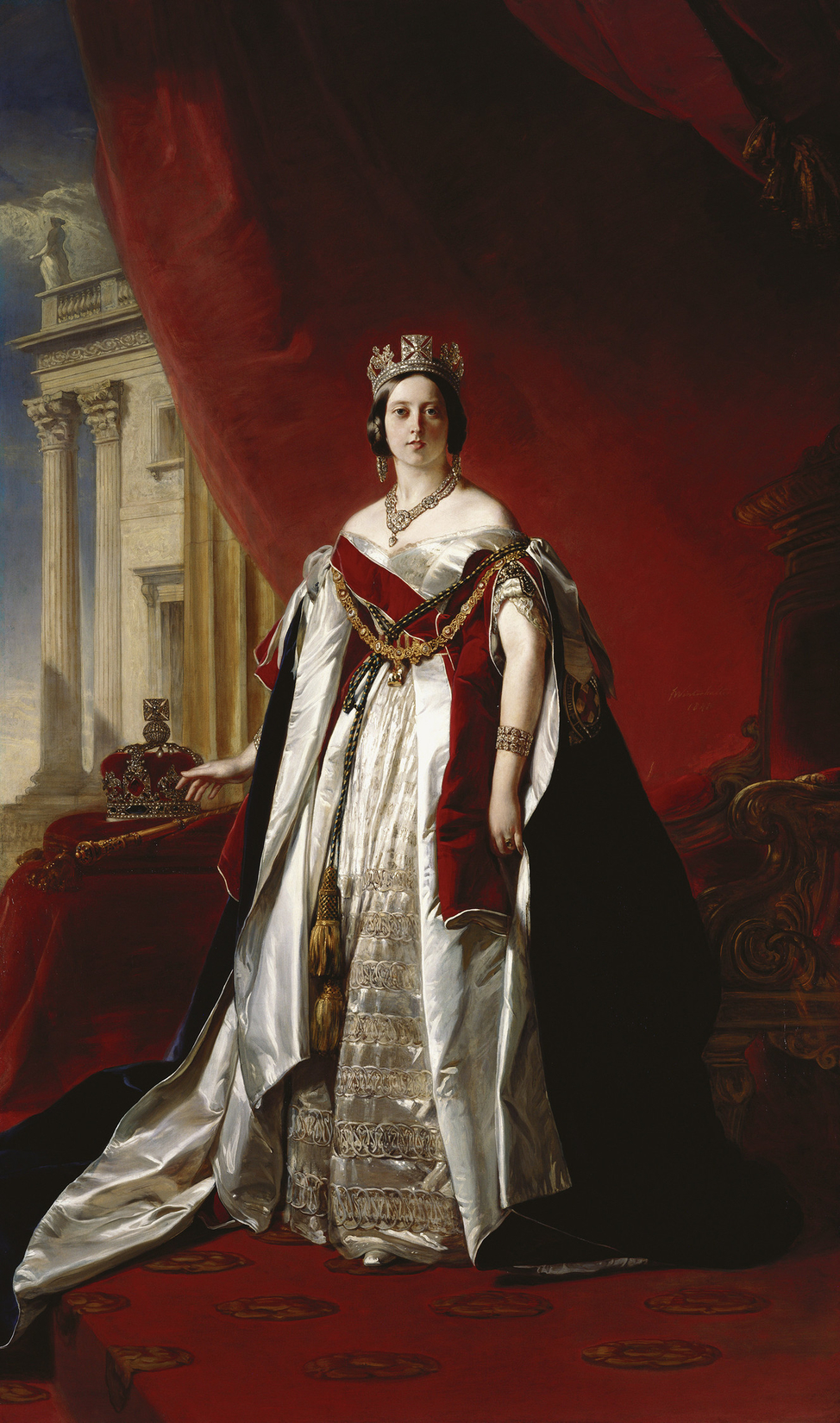
Victoria (1837–1901)

George Louis became the first British monarch of the House of Hanover as George I in 1714. The dynasty provided six British monarchs:

Of the Kingdoms of Great Britain and Ireland (changed in 1801 to the United Kingdom of Great Britain and Ireland): (Note: In 1801, the British and Irish kingdoms merged, forming the United Kingdom of Great Britain and Ireland.)

1. George I (r. 1714–1727) (Georg Ludwig = George Louis)
2. George II (r. 1727–1760) (Georg August = George Augustus)
3. George III (r. 1760–1820) (George William Frederick)
4. George IV (r. 1820–1830) (George Augustus Frederick)
5. William IV (r. 1830–1837) (William Henry)
6. Victoria (r. 1837–1901) (Alexandrina Victoria)

George I, George II, and George III also served as electors and dukes of Brunswick-Lüneburg, informally, Electors of Hanover (cf. personal union). They served as dual monarchs of Britain and Hanover, maintaining control of the Hanoverian Army and foreign policy. From 1814, when Hanover became a kingdom following the Napoleonic Wars, the British monarch was also King of Hanover.

Upon the death of William IV in 1837, the personal union of the thrones of the United Kingdom and Hanover ended. Succession to the Hanoverian throne was regulated by semi-Salic law (agnatic-cognatic), which gave priority to all male lines before female lines, and so it passed not to Queen Victoria but to her uncle, the Duke of Cumberland. In 1901, when Queen Victoria, the last British monarch provided by the House of Hanover, died, her son and heir Edward VII became the first British monarch of the House of Saxe-Coburg and Gotha. Edward took his family name from that of his father, Prince Albert of Saxe-Coburg-Gotha.

=== After end of personal union ===
Kings of Hanover after end of personal union

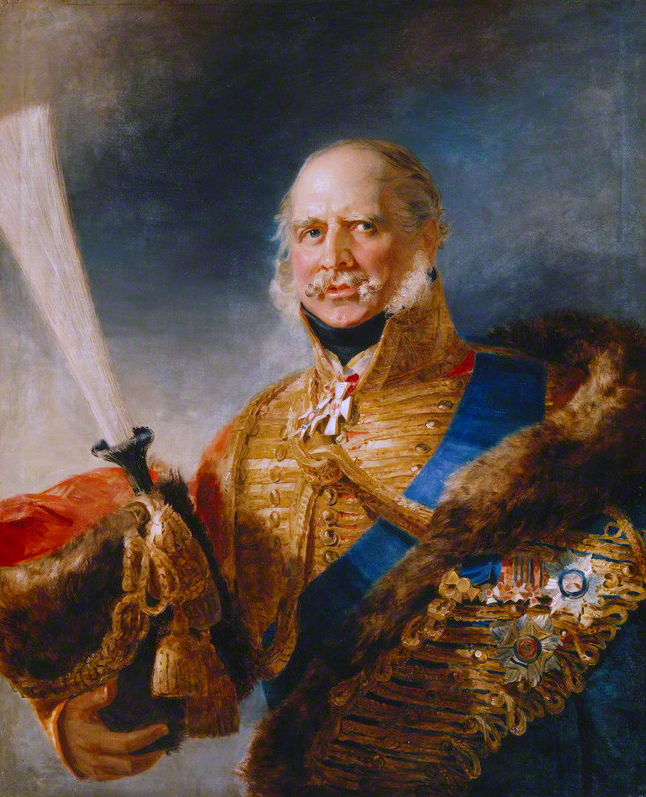
Ernest Augustus, King of Hanover (1837–1851)

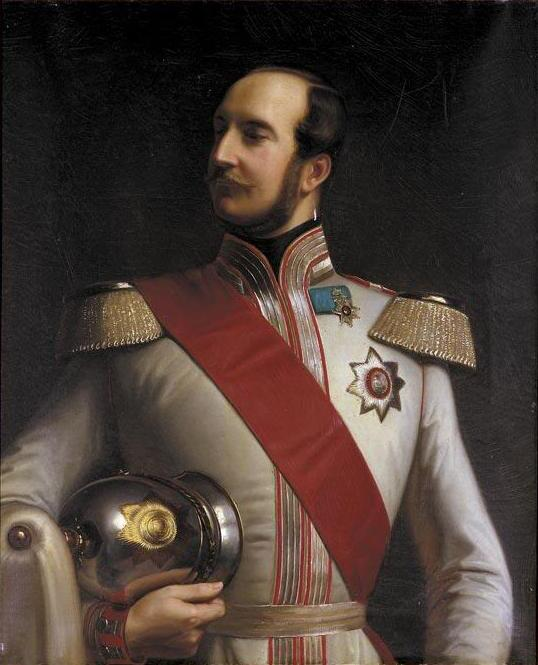
King George V of Hanover (1851–1866)

After the death of William IV in 1837, the following kings of Hanover continued the dynasty:

- Ernest Augustus, King of Hanover (r. 1837–1851)
- George V (r. 1851–1866, deposed)

The Kingdom of Hanover ended in 1866, when it was annexed by the Kingdom of Prussia, and the King of Hanover (and Duke of Cumberland) was forced to go into exile in Austria. The 1866 rift between the houses of Hanover and Hohenzollern was settled by the 1913 marriage of Princess Viktoria Luise of Prussia to Ernest Augustus, Duke of Brunswick, the last king's grandson.

=== Prince-bishops of Osnabrück ===
At the end of the Thirty Years' War, the Peace of Westphalia (1648) awarded the Prince-Bishopric of Osnabrück alternately to a Catholic bishop and to a cadet branch of Brunswick-Lüneburg. Since the treaty gave cadets priority over heirs and reigning princes, Osnabrück became a form of appanage (in alternation) of the House of Hanover.

- Ernest Augustus, Elector of Brunswick-Lüneburg (r. 1662–1698), fourth son of George, Duke of Brunswick-Lüneburg
- Ernest Augustus, Duke of York and Albany (r. 1715–1728), sixth son of Ernest Augustus, Elector of Brunswick-Lüneburg
- Prince Frederick, Duke of York and Albany (r. 1764–1802), second son of George III

Osnabrück was mediatized to Hanover in 1803.

=== Dukes of Brunswick ===
Arms of the Hanoverian kings of the United Kingdom (1816–1837)

Coat of arms of the Kingdom of Hanover 1837

In 1884, the senior branch of the House of Welf became extinct. By semi-Salic law, the House of Hanover would have acceded to the Duchy of Brunswick, but there had been strong Prussian pressure against having George V of Hanover or his son, the Duke of Cumberland, succeed to a member state of the German Empire, at least without strong conditions including the swearing to the German constitution. By a law of 1879, the Duchy of Brunswick established a temporary council of regency to take over at the Duke's death and, if necessary, to appoint a regent.

The Duke of Cumberland proclaimed himself Duke of Brunswick at the Duke's death, and lengthy negotiations ensued but were never resolved. Prince Albert of Prussia was appointed regent. After his death in 1906, Duke John Albert of Mecklenburg succeeded him. The Duke of Cumberland's eldest son died in a car accident in 1912; the father renounced Brunswick in favour of his younger son Ernest Augustus, who married the Kaiser's daughter Victoria Louise the same year, swore allegiance to the German Empire and was allowed to ascend the throne of the Duchy in November 1913. He was a major-general during the First World War, but he was overthrown as Duke of Brunswick in 1918. His father was also deprived of his British titles in 1919 for "bearing arms against Great Britain".

After having left Brunswick Palace, the duke and his family moved back to their exile seat Cumberland Castle at Gmunden, Austria, but in 1924 he received Blankenburg Castle and some other estates in a settlement with the Free State of Brunswick, and moved there in 1930. A few days before Blankenburg was handed over to the Red Army by British and American forces in late 1945, to become part of East Germany, the family quickly moved to Marienburg Castle (Hanover) with all their furniture, transported by British army trucks by the order of King George VI. Duke Ernest Augustus died at Marienburg Castle in 1953. His Herrenhausen Palace in Hanover had been completely destroyed during World War II. His eldest son, Prince Ernest Augustus, sold his remaining property at Herrenhausen Gardens in 1961 but kept the nearby Princely House, a small palace built in 1720 by George I for his daughter Anna Louise. It is now his grandson Ernest Augustus's private home.

=== Claimants ===
The later heads of the House of Hanover have been:

- George V (1866–1878)
- Ernest Augustus, Crown Prince of Hanover, 3rd Duke of Cumberland and Teviotdale (1878–1923)
- Ernest Augustus, Duke of Brunswick (1923–1953), son of the previous
- Ernest Augustus, Prince of Hanover (1953–1987)
- Ernest Augustus, Prince of Hanover (1987–present)
  - Ernest Augustus, Hereditary Prince of Hanover (heir apparent)

The family has been resident in Austria since 1866 and thus took on Austrian nationality besides their German and British. Since the later king Ernest Augustus had been created Duke of Cumberland and Teviotdale and Earl of Armagh by his father George III in 1799, these British peerages were inherited by his descendants. In 1914 the title of a Prince of Great Britain and Ireland was additionally granted to the members of the house by King George V. These peerages and titles however were suspended under the Titles Deprivation Act 1917. (Note: Privately however the British Royal Family (of the House of Saxe-Coburg and Gotha, alias House of Windsor) continued to call their German branch the Cumberlands, for instance when Edward VIII described his visit to the family in Gmunden in a letter to his mother in 1937.) However, the title Royal Prince of Great Britain and Ireland had been entered into the family's German passports, together with the German titles, in 1914. After the German Revolution of 1918–19, with the abolishment of nobility's privileges, (Note: In 1919 royalty and nobility lost their privileges as such in Germany, hereditary titles thereafter being legally retained only as part of the surname, according to Article 109 the Weimar Constitution.) titles officially became parts of the last name. So, the British prince's title is still part of the family's last name in their German passports, while it is no longer mentioned in their British documents.

On 29 August 1931, Ernest Augustus, Duke of Brunswick, as head of the House of Hanover, declared the formal resumption, for himself and his dynastic descendants, of use of his former British princely title as a secondary title of pretense, which style, "Royal Prince of Great Britain and Ireland", his grandson, the current head of the house, also called Ernest Augustus, continues to claim. He has the right to petition under the Titles Deprivation Act 1917 for the restoration of his ancestors' suspended British peerages Duke of Cumberland and Teviotdale and Earl of Armagh, but he has not done so. His father, another Ernest Augustus, did, however, successfully claim British nationality after World War II by virtue of a hitherto overlooked (and since repealed) provision of the Sophia Naturalization Act 1705. According to the decision taken by a court of the House of Lords, all family members bear the last name Guelph in the UK and are styled Royal Highnesses in their documents.

== Members ==
=== Patrilineal descent ===
1. Oberto I, 912–975
2. Oberto Obizzo, 940–1017
3. Albert Azzo I, Margrave of Milan, 970–1029
4. Albert Azzo II, Margrave of Milan, died 1097
5. Welf I, Duke of Bavaria, 1037–1101
6. Henry IX, Duke of Bavaria, 1074–1126
7. Henry X, Duke of Bavaria, 1108–1139
8. Henry the Lion, 1129–1195
9. William of Winchester, Lord of Lunenburg, 1184–1213
10. Otto I, Duke of Brunswick-Lüneburg, 1204–1252
11. Albert I, Duke of Brunswick-Lüneburg, 1236–1279
12. Albert II, Duke of Brunswick-Lüneburg, 1268–1318
13. Magnus the Pious, Duke of Brunswick-Lüneburg, 1304–1369
14. Magnus II, Duke of Brunswick-Lüneburg, 1328–1373
15. Bernard I, Duke of Brunswick-Lüneburg, 1362–1434
16. Frederick II, Duke of Brunswick-Lüneburg, 1408–1478
17. Otto V, Duke of Brunswick-Lüneburg, 1439–1471
18. Heinrich, Duke of Brunswick-Lüneburg, 1468–1532
19. Ernest I, Duke of Brunswick-Lüneburg, 1497–1546
20. William, Duke of Brunswick-Lüneburg, 1535–1592
21. George, Duke of Brunswick-Lüneburg, 1582–1641
22. Ernest Augustus, Elector of Hanover, 1629–1698
23. George I of Great Britain, 1660–1727
24. George II of Great Britain, 1683–1760
25. Frederick, Prince of Wales, 1707–1751
26. George III of the United Kingdom, 1738–1820
27. Ernest Augustus, King of Hanover, 1771–1851
28. George V of Hanover, 1819–1878
29. Ernest Augustus, Crown Prince of Hanover, 1845–1923
30. Ernest Augustus, Duke of Brunswick, 1887–1953
31. Ernest Augustus, Prince of Hanover, 1914–1987
32. Ernst August, Prince of Hanover, b. 1954
33. Prince Ernest Augustus of Hanover, b. 1983

=== Family tree ===
House of Hanover: House of Brunswick-Lüneburg, Hanover line
Key:
: The red border indicates leaders of the House
: The bold black border indicates children of leaders
: The thin black border indicates other relatives

George; 1582–1641; Duke of Brunswick-Calenberg, Prince of Calenberg	Anna Eleonore of Hesse-Darmstadt; 1601–1659
Christian Louis; 1622–1665; Duke of Brunswick-Lüneburg, Prince of Calenberg, Prince of Lüneburg	George William; 1624–1705; Duke of Brunswick-Lüneburg, Prince of Calenberg, Prince of Lüneburg	John Frederick; 1625–1679; Duke of Brunswick-Calenberg, Prince of Calenberg	Sophie Amalie of Brunswick-Calenberg; 1628–1685	Frederick III; 1609–1670; King of Denmark	Ernest Augustus; 1629–1698; Duke of Brunswick-Lüneburg, Elector-designate of Hanover, Prince of Calenberg, Prince-bishop of Osnabrück	Sophia of Hanover; 1630–1714
Sophia Dorothea of Celle; 1666–1726	George I 1660–1727; King of Great Britain, Duke of Brunswick-Lüneburg, Prince of Calenberg, Prince of Lüneburg, Elector of Hanover	Maximilian William of Brunswick-Lüneburg; 1666–1726	Sophia Charlotte; 1668–1705; Queen in Prussia	Charles Philip of Brunswick-Lüneburg; 1669–1690	Christian Henry of Brunswick-Lüneburg; 1671–1703	Ernest Augustus; 1674–1728; Duke of York and Albany, Prince-bishop of Osnabrück
Caroline of Ansbach; 1683–1737	George II; 1683–1760; King of Great Britain, Elector of Hanover	Sophia Dorothea of Hanover; 1687–1757	Frederick William I 1688–1740; King of Prussia
Augusta of Saxe-Gotha; 1719–1772	Frederick; 1707–1751; Prince of Wales	William IV; 1711–1751; Prince of Orange	Anne; 1709–1759; Princess Royal	Amelia Sophia Eleanor; 1711–1786	Caroline Elizabeth; 1713–1757	George William; 1717–1718	William Augustus; 1721–1765; Duke of Cumberland	Mary; 1723–1772	Frederick II; 1720–1785; Landgrave of Hesse-Kassel	Louise; 1724–1751	Frederick V 1723–1766; King of Denmark
Augusta Frederica; 1737–1813	Charles William Ferdinand; 1735–1806; Duke of Brunswick	George III; 1738–1820; King of Great Britain, Duke of Brunswick-Lüneburg, Elector, then King, of Hanover	Charlotte of Mecklenburg-Strelitz; 1744–1818	Frederick William II; 1744–1797; King of Prussia	Edward; 1739–1767; Duke of York and Albany	Elizabeth Caroline; 1741–1759	William Henry; 1743–1805; Duke of Gloucester and Edinburgh	Henry; 1745–1790; Duke of Cumberland and Strathearn	Louisa; 1749–1768	Frederick; 1750–1765	Caroline Matilda; 1751–1775	Christian VII; 1749–1808; King of Denmark
Caroline of Brunswick; 1768–1821	George IV; 1762–1830; King of Great Britain, Duke of Brunswick-Lüneburg, Elector of Hanover (regent 1811–1820)	Frederick; 1763–1827; Duke of York and Albany, Prince-bishop of Osnabrück	Frederica Charlotte; 1767–1820; Princess of Prussia	Adelaide of Saxe-Meiningen; 1792–1849	William IV; 1765–1837; King of Great Britain, Elector of Hanover	Charlotte; 1766–1828; Princess Royal	Frederick I 1754–1816; King of Württemberg	Edward; 1767–1820; Duke of Kent and Strathearn	Victoria; 1786–1861; Princess of Saxe-Coburg-Saalfeld	Augusta Sophia; 1768–1840
Elizabeth; 1770–1840	Frederick VI; 1769–1829; Landgrave of Hesse-Homburg	Ernest Augustus; 1771–1851; Duke of Brunswick-Lüneburg, King of Hanover	Frederica of Mecklenburg-Strelitz; 1778–1841	Augustus Frederick; 1773–1843; Duke of Sussex	Adolphus; 1774–1850; Duke of Cambridge	Augusta; 1797–1889; Princess of Hesse-Kassel	Mary; 1776–1857	William Frederick; 1776–1834; Duke of Gloucester and Edinburgh	Sophia Matilda; 1777–1848	Octavius; 1779–1783	Alfred; 1780–1783	Amelia; 1783–1810
Leopold I 1790–1865; King of the Belgians	Charlotte; 1796–1817; Princess of Wales	George V 1819–1878; Duke of Brunswick-Lüneburg, King of Hanover	Marie of Saxe-Altenburg; 1818–1907	Charlotte; 1819; Princess of Clarence	Elizabeth; 1820–1821; Princess of Clarence	George; 1819–1904; Duke of Cambridge	Augusta; 1822–1916; Princess of Cambridge	Frederick William; 1819–1904; Grand Duke of Mecklenburg-Strelitz	Mary Adelaide; 1833–1897; Princess of Cambridge	Francis; 1837–1900; Duke of Teck	Victoria; 1819–1901; Queen of Great Britain	Albert; 1819–1861; Prince of Saxe-Coburg and Gotha
Thyra; 1853–1933; Princess of Denmark	Ernest Augustus; 1845–1923; Duke of Brunswick-Lüneburg, Crown Prince of Hanover, Duke of Cumberland and Teviotdale	Frederica; 1848–1926; Princess of Hanover	Alphons von Pawel-Rammingen; 1843–1932	Marie; 1849–1904; Princess of Hanover	Wilhelm II; 1859–1941; Emperor of Germany
Maximilian; 1867–1929; Prince of Baden	Marie Louise; 1879–1948; Princess of Hanover	George William Christian Albert Edward Alexander Friedrich Waldemar Ernst Adolf; 1880–1912; Hereditary Prince of Hanover	Alexandra; 1882–1963; Princess of Hanover	Frederick Francis IV; 1882–1945; Grand Duke of Mecklenburg-Schwerin	Olga; 1884–1958; Princess of Hanover	Christian Friedrich Wilhelm Georg Peter Waldemar; 1885–1901; Prince of Hanover	Ernest Augustus; 1887–1953; Duke of Brunswick	Victoria Louise; 1892–1980; Princess of Prussia
Ortrud; 1925–1980; Princess of Schleswig-Holstein-Sonderburg-Glücksburg	Ernest Augustus; 1914–1987; Prince of Hanover	Countess Monika zu Solms-Laubach; 1929–2015	George William; 1915–2006; Prince of Hanover	Sophie; 1914–2001; Princess of Greece and Denmark	Frederica; 1917–1981; Princess of Hanover	Paul; 1901–1964; King of Greece	Christian Oscar Ernst August Wilhelm Viktor Georg Heinrich; 1919–1981; Prince of Hanover	Mireille Dutry b. 1946	Welf Heinrich Ernst August Georg Christian Berthold Friedrich Wilhelm Louis Ferdinand; 1923–1997; Prince of Hanover	Alexandra; 1937–2015; Princess of Ysenburg and Büdingen
Count Michael von Hochberg	Marie b. 1952; Princess of Hanover	Chantal Hochuli	Ernst August b. 1954; Prince of Hanover	Caroline b. 1957; Princess of Monaco	Ludwig Rudolph; 1955–1988; Prince of Hanover	Isabella von Thurn und Valsássina-Como-Vercelli; 1962–1988	Olga Sophie Charlotte Anna b. 1958; Princess of Hanover	Alexandra b. 1959; Princess of Hanover	Andreas; 8th Prince of Leiningen	Heinrich b. 1961; Prince of Hanover	Thyra von Westernhagen
Ekaterina Igorievna Malysheva b. 1986	Ernst August b. 1983; Prince of Hanover	Christian b. 1985; Prince of Hanover	Alexandra b. 1999; Princess of Hanover

== Legacy ==
Many towns and provinces across the British Empire were named after the ruling House of Hanover and its members. They include the U.S. state of Georgia, U.S. towns Hanover, Massachusetts; Hanover, New Hampshire; Hanover, Pennsylvania; Hanover Township, Jo Daviess County, Illinois, counties Hanover County, Virginia; Caroline County, Virginia; Brunswick County, Virginia; New Hanover County, North Carolina; Brunswick County, North Carolina; King George County, Virginia, places named Georgia in New Jersey (e.g. New Brunswick, NJ), Vermont, Arkansas and South Dakota, seven towns in the U.S. and Canada named after Queen Charlotte. Furthermore, the Canadian province of New Brunswick and towns Hanover, Ontario, Guelph; Ontario, and Victoria, British Columbia; in South Africa the town Hanover, Northern Cape, in Australia the state Victoria and the city Adelaide, in the UK six and in the US thirteen towns named Brunswick. Furthermore, one each in Australia and New Zealand, and worldwide more than fifty towns named Victoria. There are also numerous streets and squares, such as Hanover Square, Westminster, Hanover Square (Manhattan), Hanover Square, Syracuse or Queen Street, Brisbane with its intersections named after members of the House.

Georgian architecture gives distinction to the architectural styles current between 1714 and 1830 in most English-speaking countries.

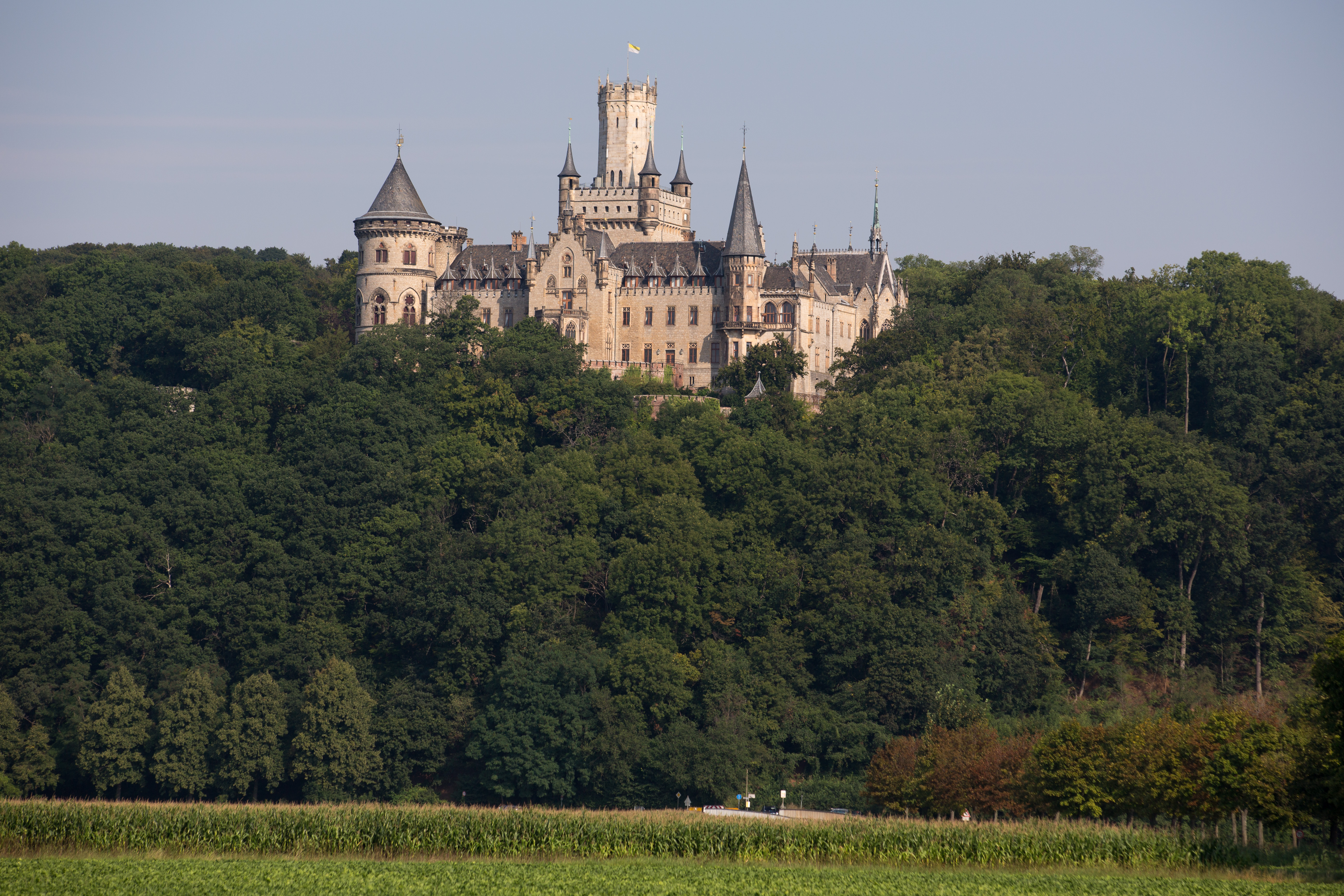
Marienburg Castle (Hanover), present seat of the Princes of Hanover

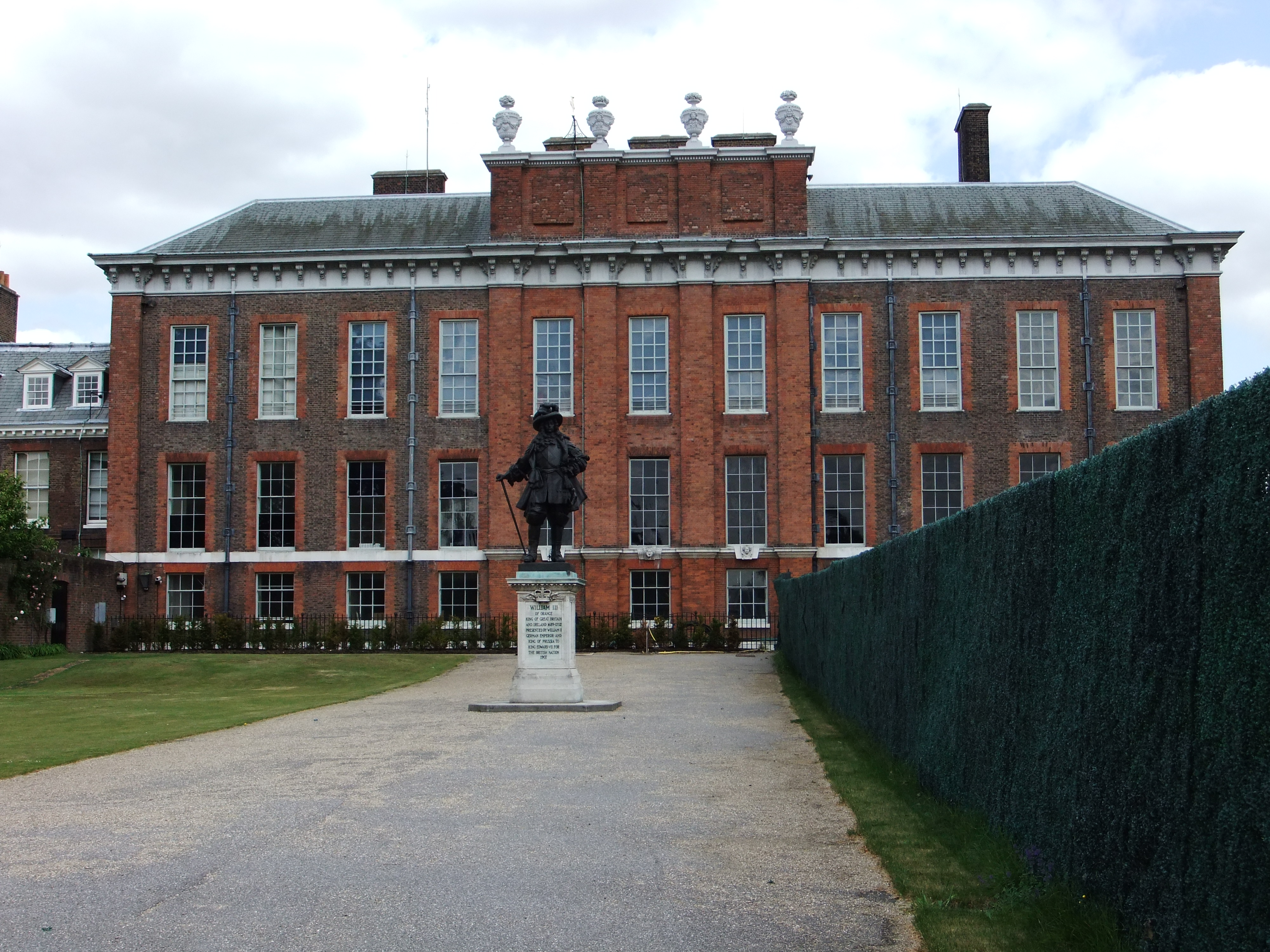
Kensington Palace, London, England

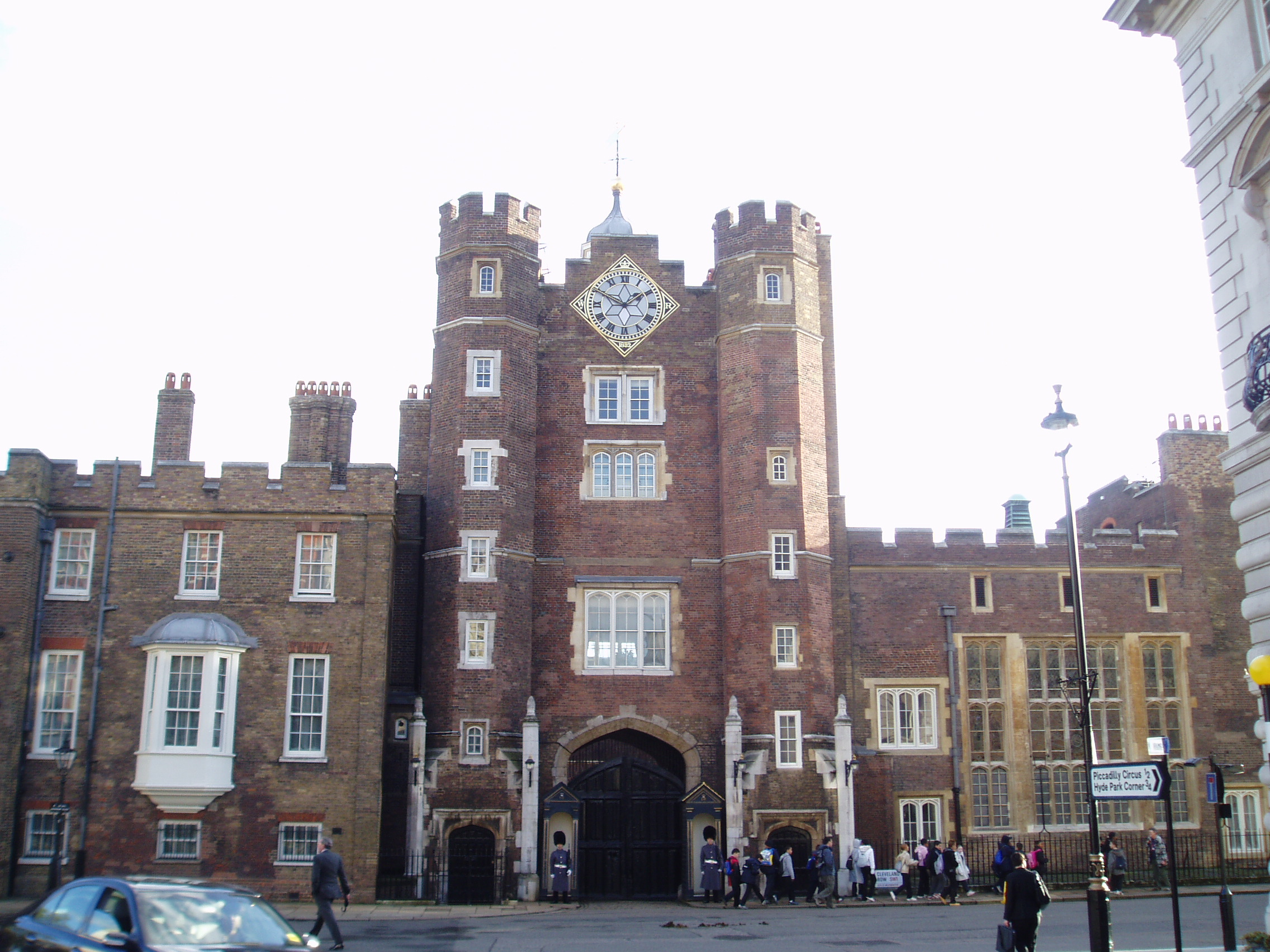
St James's Palace, London, England

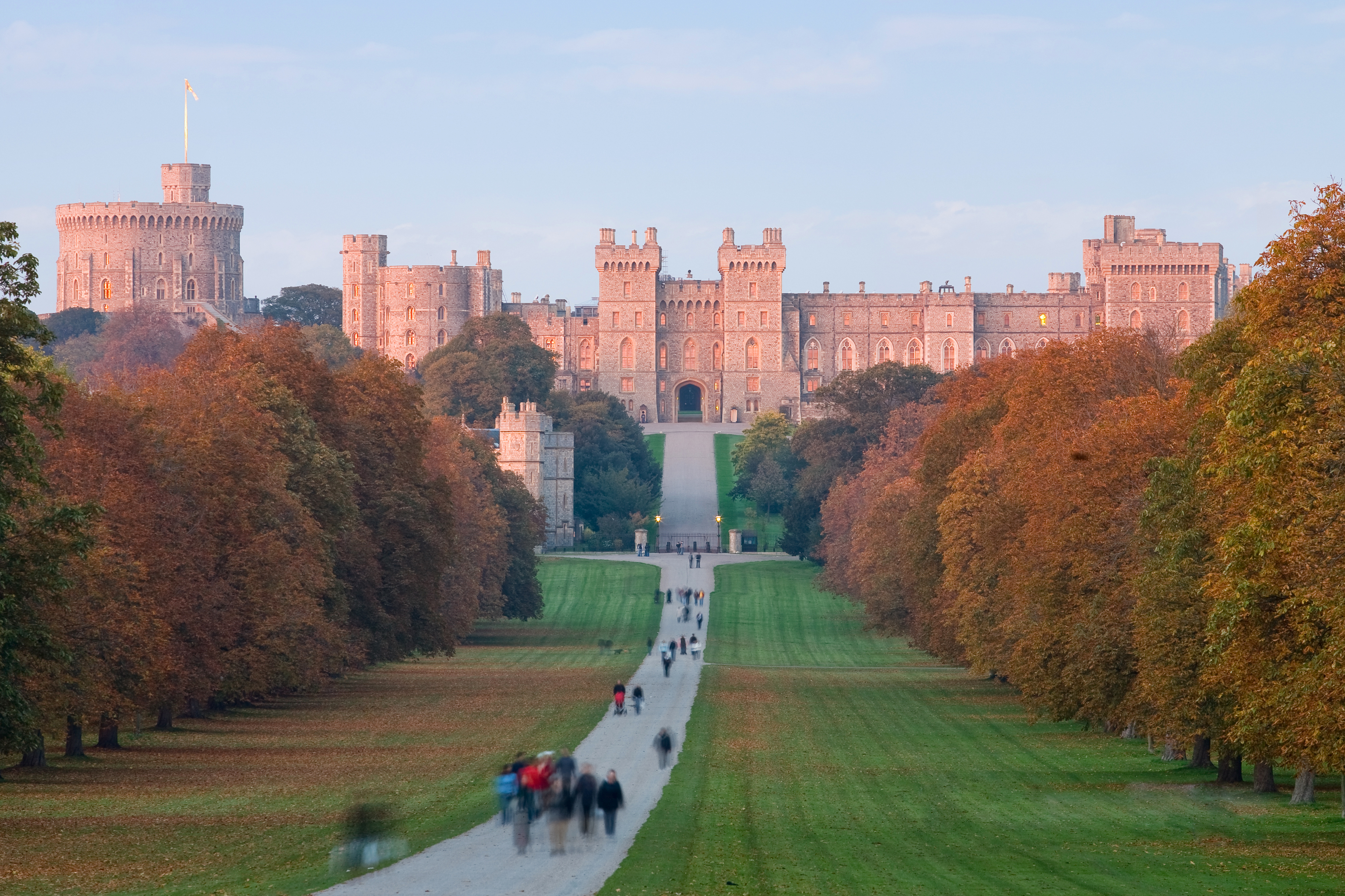
Windsor Castle, Berkshire, England

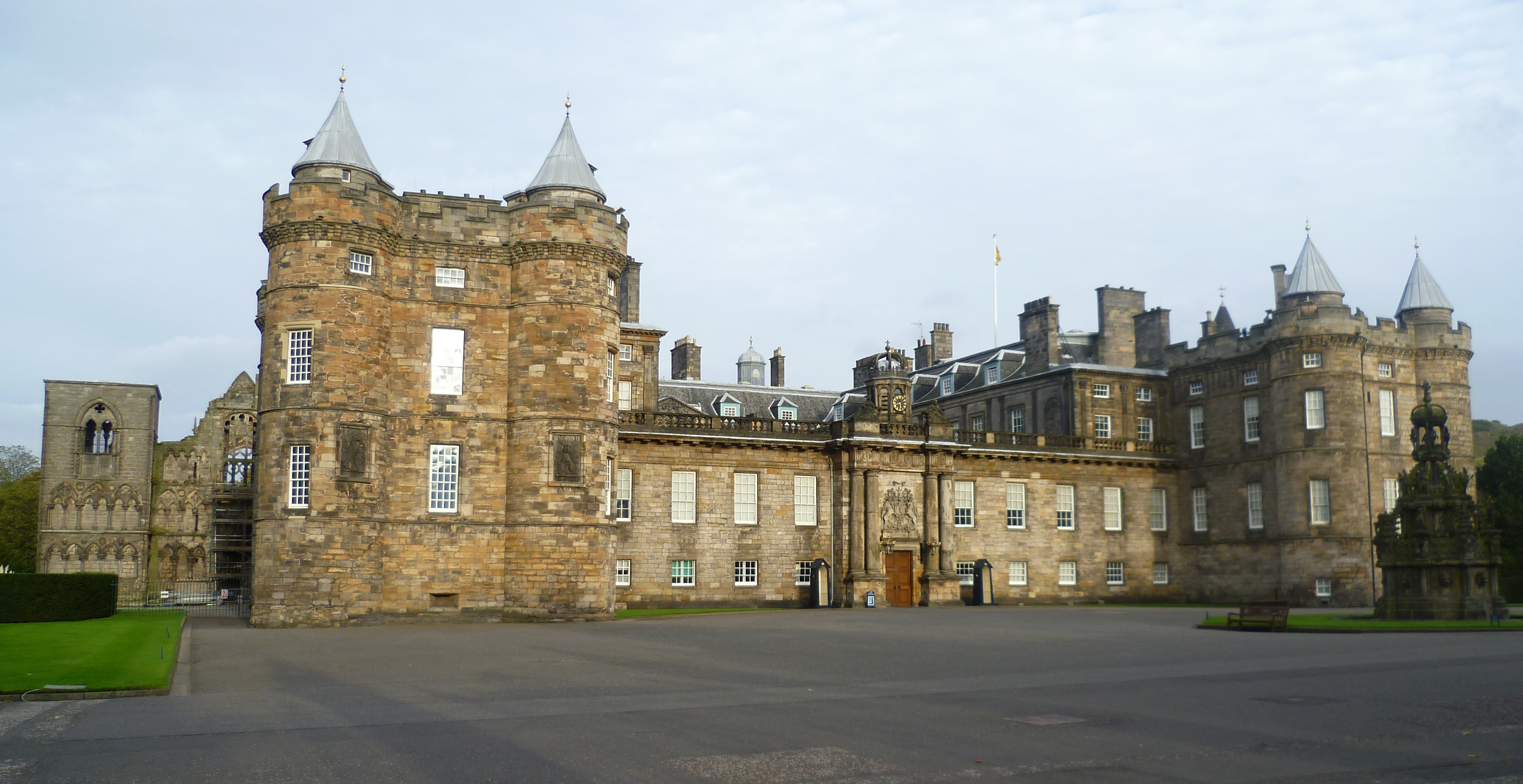
Holyrood Palace, Edinburgh, Scotland

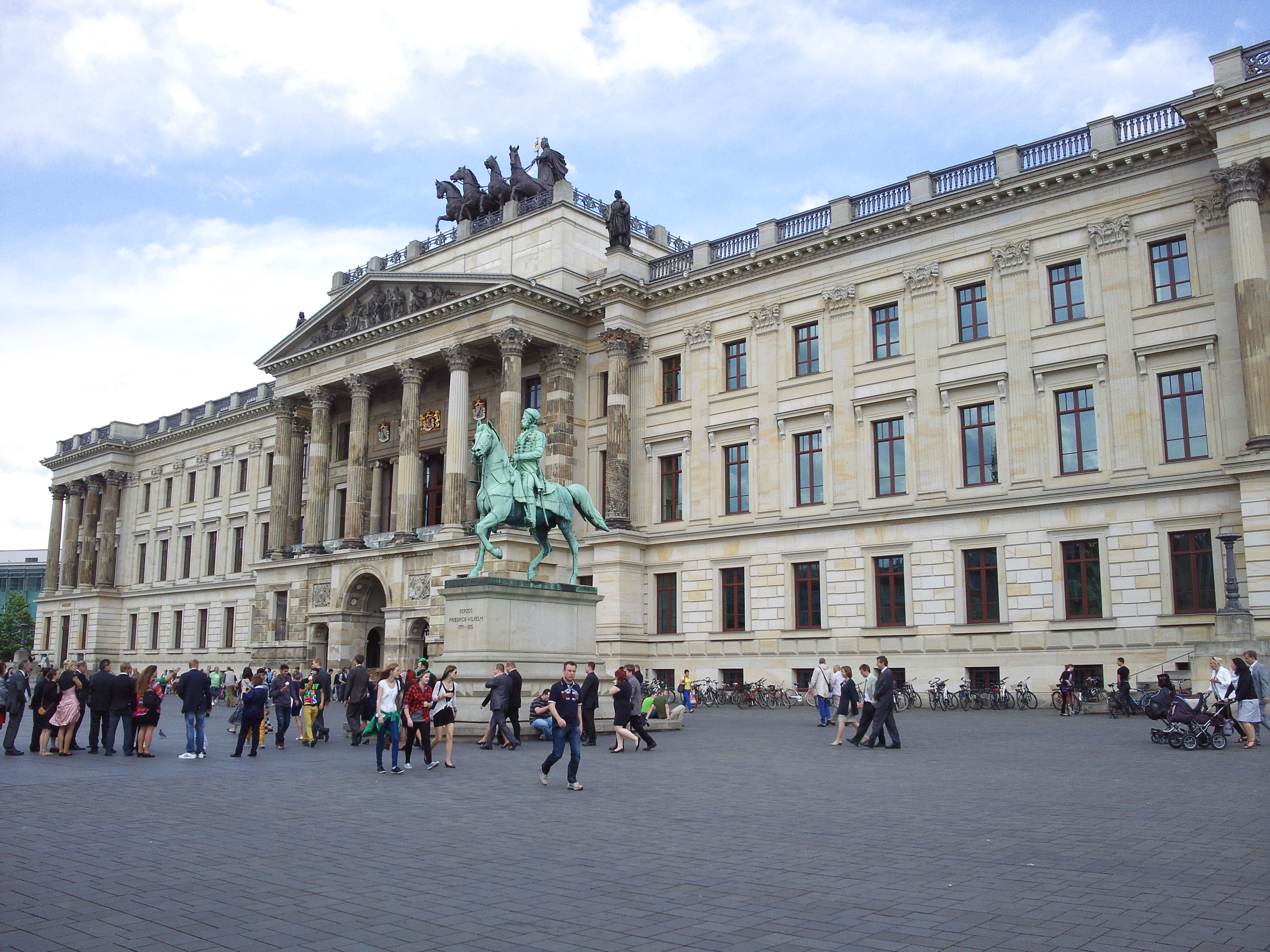
Brunswick Palace, Braunschweig, Germany

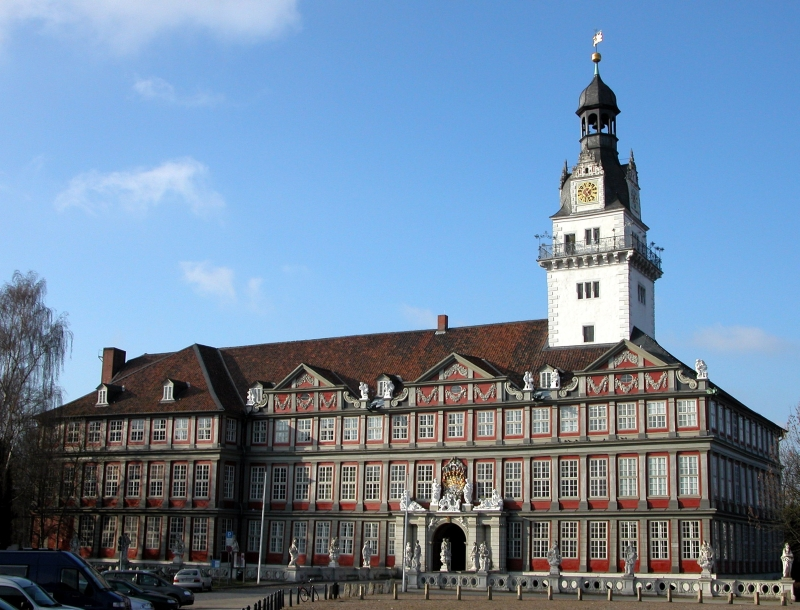
Schloss Wolfenbüttel, Wolfenbüttel, Germany

The Leine Palace in Hanover (Former Royal Residence of the Kingdom of Hanover)

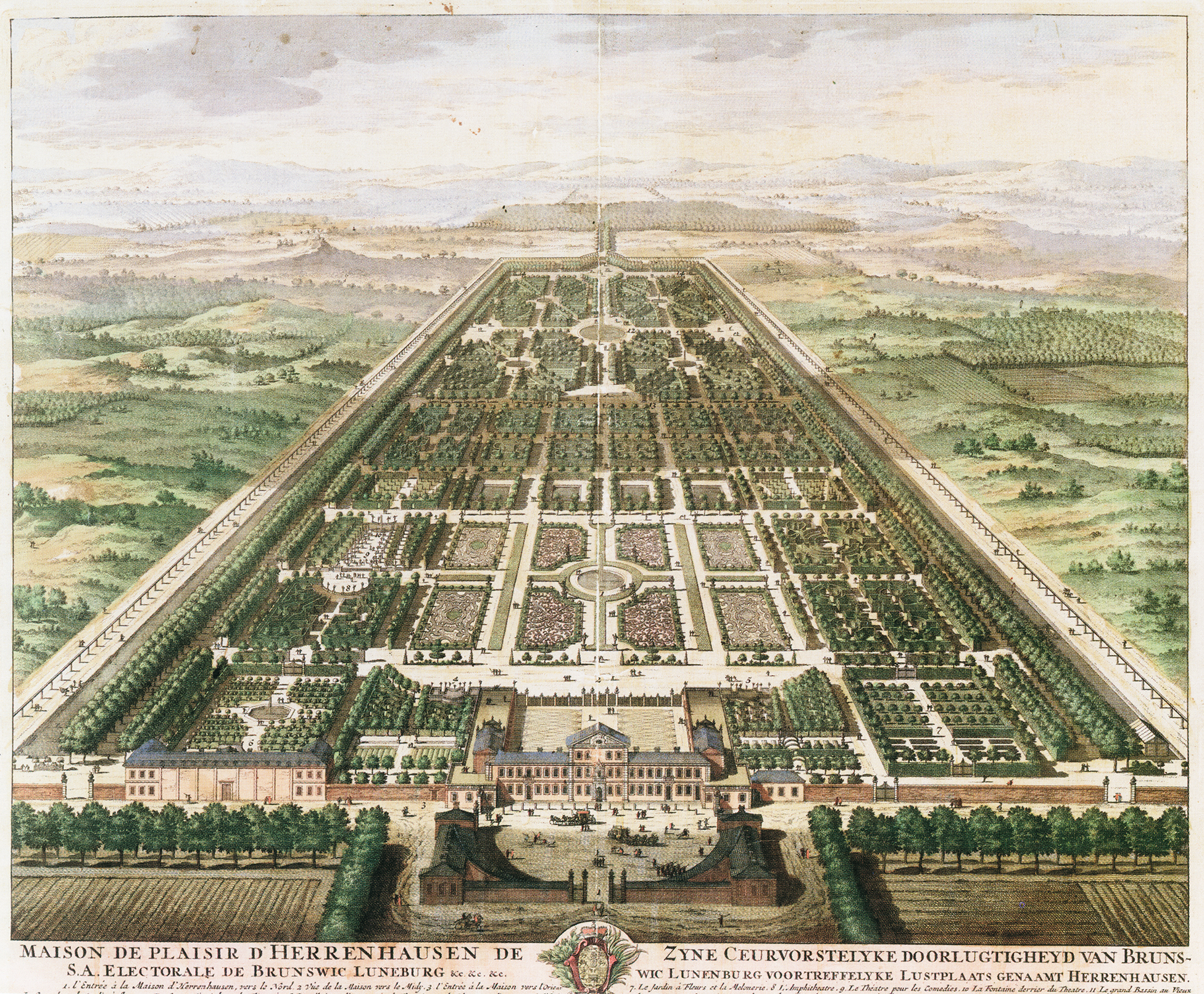
Herrenhausen Palace and Gardens in Hanover (c. 1708)

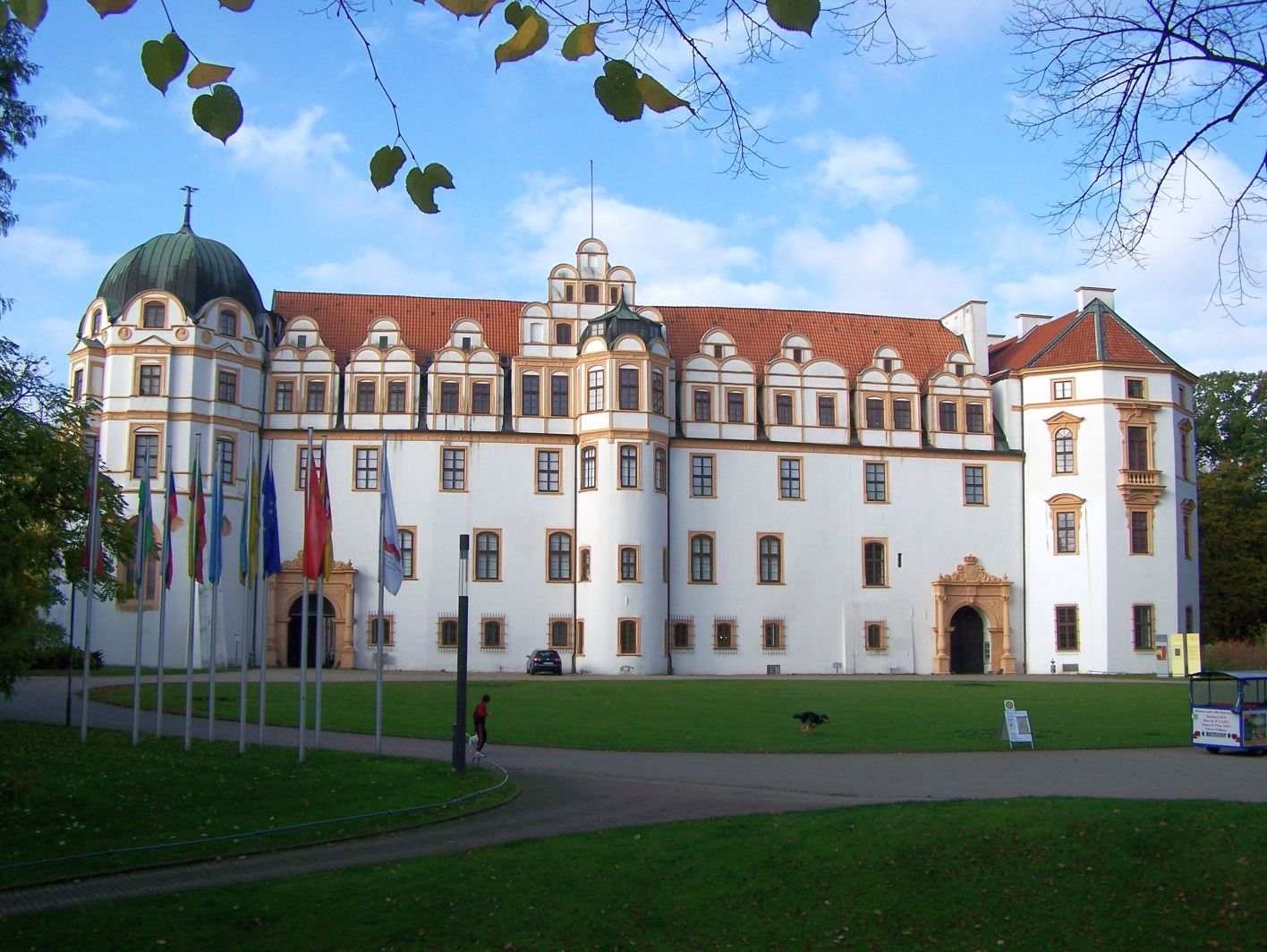
Celle Castle, Celle, Germany

== See also ==
- Hanoverian prince for family tree
- King of Hanover
- Georgian era for kings George I, II, III, IV
- History of Hanover
- Electorate of Hanover
- Kingdom of Hanover
- Personal union of Great Britain and Hanover
- German Chancery

== Notes ==
Royal house House of Hanover Cadet branch of the House of Welf
New title Duchy created from the stem duchy of Saxony	Ruling house of the Duchy of Brunswick-Lüneburg; 1235–1692	Duchy raised to Electorate by Emperor Leopold I for aid given in the Nine Years' War
New title Duchy raised to Electorate	Ruling house of the Electorate of Hanover; 1692–1803	Electorate abolished Occupied by France in the Napoleonic Wars
Preceded by House of Stuart	Ruling house of the Kingdom of Great Britain; 1714–1800	Kingdoms merged by Acts of Union 1800
Preceded by House of Stuart	Ruling house of the Kingdom of Ireland; 1714–1800	Kingdoms merged by Acts of Union 1800
New title Union of Great Britain and Ireland	Ruling house of the United Kingdom; 1801–1901	Succeeded by House of Saxe-Coburg and Gotha
New title Electorate raised to Kingdom at the Congress of Vienna	Ruling house of the Kingdom of Hanover; 1814–1866	Kingdom abolished Annexed by Prussia in the Austro-Prussian War
Preceded by House of Brunswick-Wolfenbüttel-Bevern	Ruling house of the Duchy of Brunswick; 1913–1918	Duchy abolished German Revolution after defeat in World War I
