= Attorney-General v Prince Ernest Augustus of Hanover =

Attorney-General v. Prince Ernest Augustus of Hanover
- Court: House of Lords

Court membership
- Judges sitting: Viscount Simonds; Lord Normand; Lord Morton of Henryton; Lord Tucker; Lord Somervell of Harrow

Attorney-General v Prince Ernest Augustus of Hanover [1957] 1 All ER 49; [1957] A.C. 436 was a 1956 House of Lords case concerning statutory interpretation and the proper construction of the Sophia Naturalization Act 1705.

== Background ==
The Sophia Naturalization Act 1705 provided that all the children and descendants of Electress Sophia of Hanover, with the exception of Roman Catholics, shall be naturalized as British subjects. The Act was repealed by the British Nationality Act 1948, with the proviso that every person who was a British subject before the entry of force of the Act shall continue to be a British subject.

Prince Ernest Augustus of Hanover, a German citizen but a linear descendant of the Electress Sophia, sought a declaration that he was a British subject under the 1705 and 1948 Acts. The Attorney-General opposed the application, arguing that Parliament had not intended to naturalize a large number of remote descendants of the Electress Sophia when it passed the Sophia Naturalization Act 1705. It was argued that the 1705 Act's preamble supported this interpretation.

In the High Court, Vaisey J found against the plaintiff. Prince Ernest appealed to the Court of Appeal, where Evershed MR, Birkett and Romer LJJ reversed the High Court's decision. The Attorney-General then appealed to the House of Lords. The Attorney-General and Bryan Clauson appeared for the appellant; Richard Wilberforce and John Knox appeared for the respondent.

== House of Lords ==
The House of Lords upheld the Court of Appeal's decision. Viscount Simonds held that the words of the 1705 Act clearly naturalized all the linear, non-Catholic descendants of Electress Sophia of Hanover, no matter how remote.

Concerning the Act's preamble, Lord Simonds stated that:

"if enacting words are plain and unambiguous one does not need to look at the preamble to an Act of Parliament, but if they are not clear and unambiguous one may look at it."

Prince Ernest's claim was allowed and he was recognized as a British subject.
