= Prince Ludwig Rudolf of Hanover =

Member of the House of Hanover and music producer

Ludwig Rudolf
- Prince of Hanover
- Born: 21 November 1955; Hanover, Lower Saxony, West Germany
- Died: 29 November 1988 (aged 33); Gmunden, Upper Austria, Austria
- Burial: 2 December 1988; Grunau im Almtal, Austria
- Spouse: Countess Isabella Maria von Thurn und Valsássina-Como-Vercelli (m. 1987; died 1988)
- Issue: Prince Otto (Heinrich Ariprand Georg Johannes Ernst August Vinzenz Egmont Franz)
Names
- German: Ludwig Rudolf Georg Wilhelm Philipp Friedrich Wolrad Maximilian
- House: Hanover
- Father: Ernst August, Prince of Hanover
- Mother: Princess Ortrud of Schleswig-Holstein-Sonderburg-Glücksburg

Ludwig Rudolf, Prince of Hanover, Duke of Brunswick-Lüneburg (German: Ludwig Rudolf Georg Wilhelm Philipp Friedrich Wolrad Maximilian Prinz von Hannover) (21 November 1955 – 29 November 1988) was a member of the House of Hanover and a music producer.

== Early life and career ==
Ludwig Rudolf was born in Hanover, Lower Saxony, Germany, the third child and second son of Ernst August, Prince of Hanover, Hereditary Prince of Brunswick (1914–1987) and his wife, Princess Ortrud of Schleswig-Holstein-Sonderburg-Glücksburg (1925–1980). Ludwig Rudolf was a great-great-great-great-grandson of George III of the United Kingdom and a great-grandson of Wilhelm II, German Emperor.

Ludwig Rudolf had trained to become a music producer in Los Angeles and London.

== Marriage and death ==
Having obtained the consent of Elizabeth II by Order in Council on 15 September 1987 pursuant to the Royal Marriages Act 1772, Ludwig Rudolf, a Lutheran, married the Roman Catholic Countess Isabella Maria von Thurn und Valsassina-Como-Vercelli (born September 8 1962 in Gmunden, Upper Austria), a former fashion model at her father's ancestral Austrian estate, Bleiburg Castle, Carinthia on 4 October 1987. She was the daughter of Count Ariprand von Thurn und Valsassina-Como-Vercelli (1925–1996), whose family, an Austrian branch of the Della Torre dynasty, ruled Milan in the 13th and 14th century, and his wife, Princess Maria Perpetua Euphemia von Auersperg (1929-2025). They had one son:

- Prince Otto Heinrich Ariprand George Johannes Ernst August Vinzenz Egmont Franz of Hanover (born 13 February 1988)

In the early hours of 29 November 1988, after the couple had entertained guests at their home, Königinvilla (The Queen's Villa) in Gmunden, a house left to them by Ludwig Rudolf's elder brother Ernst August, the prince went to the bedroom where his wife had retired before midnight, and found Isabella sprawled fully dressed across their bed. The efforts of her husband and friends to revive her proved futile. Ludwig Rudolf, who had been investigated previously on suspicion of illegal drug purchases, placed a call to his brother, Ernst August, in London, imploring him to take care of the couple's 10-month-old son. As authorities removed Isabella's body and investigated the scene, discovering syringes, cocaine and heroin, Ludwig Rudolf slipped away. Hours later, the prince was found in his car near his family's hunting lodge several miles away, on Lake Traun. He had the muzzle of a rifle in his mouth and was dead of a gunshot wound.

The case was closed without further investigation. Ludwig Rudolf and Isabelle were interred on 2 December 1988 at Grünau im Almtal, Austria, having been married less than 14 months. Custody of their infant son Otto Heinrich was awarded, contrary to the expressed wishes of Ludwig Rudolf, to the child's maternal grandparents. He grew up at their castle, Schloss Bleiburg, in Austria, and then studied art at Braunschweig University of Art in Brunswick (Braunschweig). He lives with his maternal grandmother in Salzburg.

== Ancestry ==
Ancestors of Prince Ludwig Rudolf of Hanover

8. Ernest Augustus, Crown Prince of Hanover
4. Ernest Augustus, Duke of Brunswick
9. Princess Thyra of Denmark
2. Ernest Augustus, Hereditary Prince of Brunswick
10. Wilhelm II, German Emperor
5. Princess Viktoria Luise of Prussia
11. Augusta Viktoria of Schleswig-Holstein
1. Prince Ludwig Rudolf of Hanover
12. Friedrich, Duke of Schleswig-Holstein-Sonderburg-Glücksburg
6. Prince Albrecht of Schleswig-Holstein-Sonderburg-Glücksburg
13. Princess Adelheid of Schaumburg-Lippe
3. Princess Ortrud of Schleswig-Holstein-Sonderburg-Glücksburg
14. Bruno, 3rd Prince of Ysenburg and Büdingen
7. Princess Hertha of Ysenburg and Büdingen
15. Countess Bertha of Castell-Rüdenhausen
