= Countess Monika zu Solms-Laubach =

Princess of Hanover

Monika
- Princess of Hanover; Duchess of Brunswick-Lüneburg
- Born: 8 August 1929; Schloss Laubach, Laubach, People's State of Hesse, Weimar Republic
- Died: 4 June 2015 (aged 85)
- Spouse: Ernest Augustus, Prince of Hanover (m. 1981; died 1987)
- House: Solms-Laubach (by birth); Hanover (by marriage)
- Father: Georg, 9th Count of Solms-Laubach
- Mother: Princess Johanna of Solms-Hohensolms-Lich
- Occupation: Philanthropist

Monika, Princess of Hanover, Duchess of Brunswick-Lüneburg (born Countess Monika zu Solms-Laubach; 8 August 1929 – 4 June 2015) was a German noblewoman and philanthropist. She was the second wife of Ernest Augustus, Prince of Hanover. A member of the House of Solms-Laubach by birth, she became the Princess Consort of Hanover and Duchess of Brunswick-Lüneburg through her marriage. She was the founder of the Dollhouse Museum in Laubach.

== Early life ==
Countess Monika zu Solms-Laubach was born on 8 August 1929 at Laubach Castle in Laubach, Hesse, Germany. She was the fourth child of Georg, 9th Count of Solms-Laubach (1899-1969) and his wife, Princess Johanna Marie of Solms-Hohensolms-Lich (1905-1982). Her father was the grandson of Bruno, 3rd Prince of Ysenburg and Büdingen and her mother was the daughter of Prince Charles of Solms-Hohensolms-Lich. Her family had been the sovereign house of the County of Solms-Laubach but were mediatized into the Grand Duchy of Hesse in 1806.

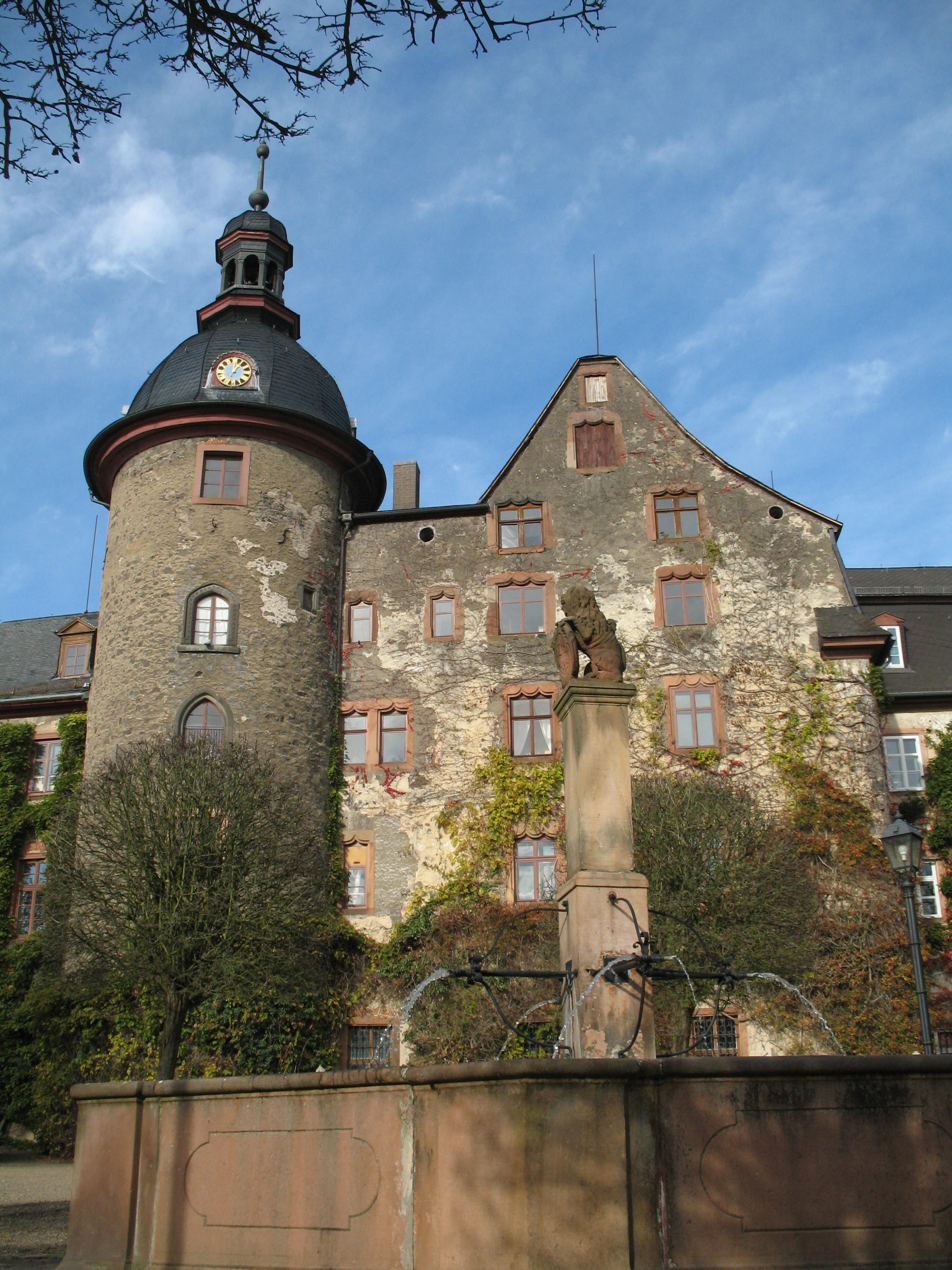
Countess Monika zu Solms-Laubach's birthplace, Laubach Castle.

== Marriage ==
On 16 July 1981 she married Ernest Augustus, Prince of Hanover in a civil ceremony. A religious ceremony was held on 17 July 1981 in Laubach. She was Ernest Augustus's second wife. He had previously been married to her first cousin once removed, Princess Ortrud of Schleswig-Holstein-Sonderburg-Glücksburg, who died in 1980. According to the Royal Marriages Act 1772, their marriage required approval from the British monarch in order for Ernest Augustus to stay in the British line of succession. Elizabeth II consented to the marriage on 10 June 1981.

== Later life and death ==
In November 2008, Princess Monika auctioned off a collection of jewelry that had previously belonged to Princess Thyra of Denmark. The collection, which included pieces originally belonging to Alexander III of Russia, Maria Feodorovna of Russia, Grand Duchess Olga Alexandrovna of Russia, George I of Greece, and Alexandra of Denmark, was the largest grouping of Imperial presents auctioned since the Forbes Collection of Fabergé in 2004.

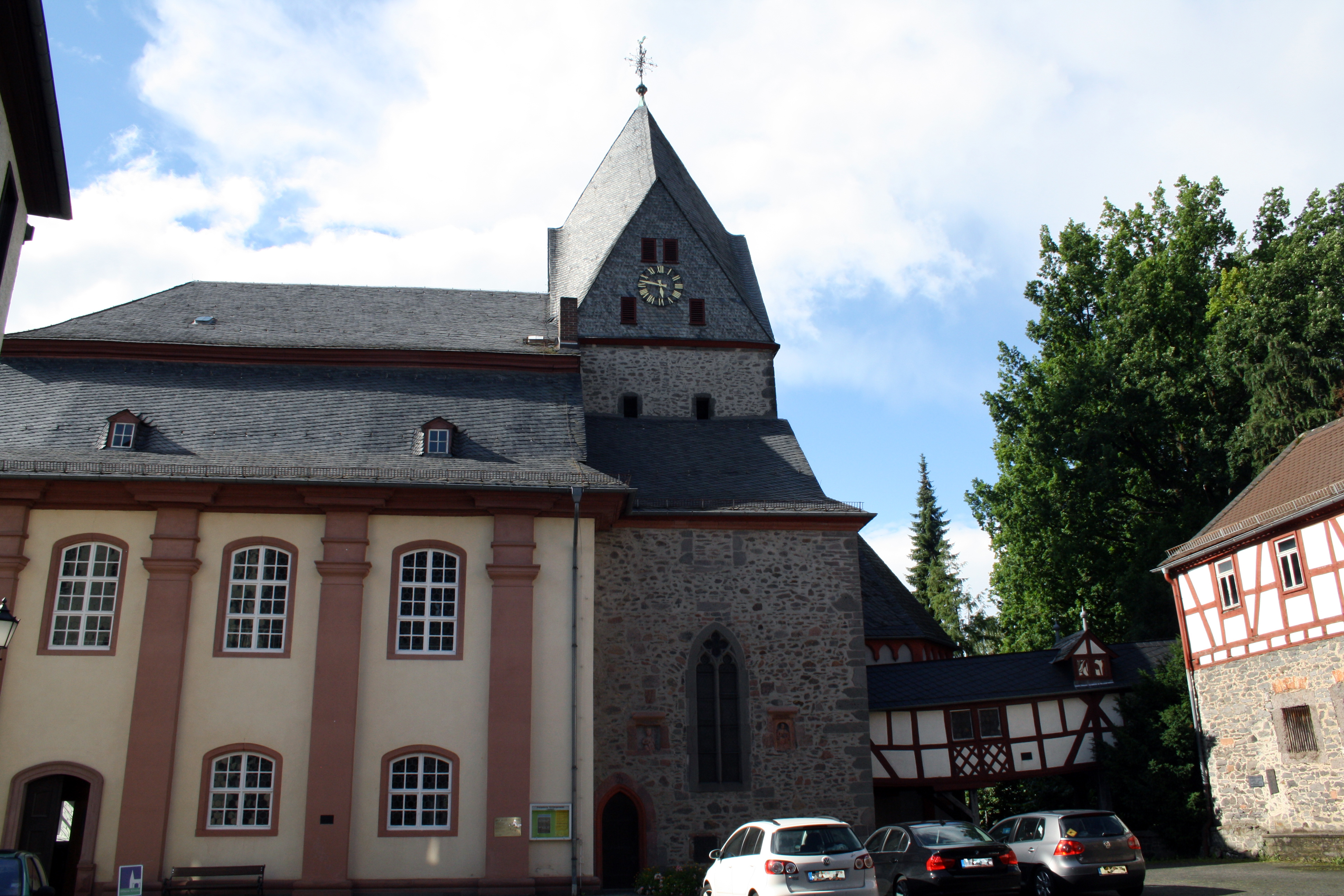
The Evangelische Stadtkirche Laubach

Princess Monika founded the Princess Monika of Hanover Foundation. Through her foundation she created Dollhouse Museum Laubach in 2011; a museum which exhibits a collection of her childhood dollhouses to the public. The collection features dollhouses made between 1820 and 1930. It opened in October 2011.

She died on 4 June 2015, three days after the death of her sister-in-law Princess Alexandra of Hanover. A Lutheran funeral service was held at the Evangelische Stadtkirche Laubach on 13 June 2015.

Countess Monika zu Solms-Laubach House of Solms Born: 8 August 1929 Died: 4 June 2015
Titles in pretence
Vacant Title last held by Princess Ortrud of Schleswig-Holstein-Sonderburg-Glücksburg	— TITULAR — Queen Consort of Hanover; Duchess Consort of Brunswick; 1981 – 1987	Succeeded by Chantal Hochuli
