= Alexandra Prinzessin von Hannover =

Princess Alexandra
- Princess Welf Henry of Hanover
- Born: 23 October 1937; Frankfurt am Main, Hesse, Nazi Germany
- Died: 1 June 2015 (aged 77); Frankfurt am Main, Hesse, Germany
- Spouse: Prince Welf Henry of Hanover (m. 1960; died 1997)
Names
- German: Alexandra Sophie Cecilie Anna Maria Friederike Benigna Dorothea
- House: Ysenburg-Büdingen
- Father: Otto Friedrich III, Prince of Ysenburg and Büdingen
- Mother: Princess Felicitas Reuss of Köstritz

Princess Alexandra of Hanover (née Princess Alexandra Sophie Cecilie Anna Maria Friederike Benigna Dorothea of Ysenburg and Büdingen; 23 October 1937 – 1 June 2015) was a German politician, philanthropist, and wife of Prince Welf Henry of Hanover. She lastly served as a councilwoman representing the Niederrad district of Frankfurt on the Frankfurt City Council (German: Frankfurter Stadtverordnetenversammlung). She was a member of the Christian Democratic Union political party.

== Personal life ==
Princess Alexandra of Hanover was born on 23 October 1937 in Frankfurt am Main and was the second eldest child and only daughter of Otto Friedrich III, Prince of Ysenburg und Büdingen zu Wächtersbach and his wife Felicitas Anna Eleonore Cecilie, Princess Reuss of Köstritz. She was the sister of Wolfgang-Ernst, Prince of Ysenburg and Büdingen.

Alexandra married Prince Welf Henry of Hanover, the fourth son of Ernest Augustus, Duke of Brunswick and his wife Princess Victoria Louise of Prussia, in a civil ceremony on 20 September 1960 at Büdingen, Hesse, and in a religious ceremony on the following day at the Marienkirche in Büdingen. The couple had no children.

She was the aunt-in-law of Queen Sofía of Spain and King Constantine II of Greece, and grandaunt of King Felipe VI of Spain, through her sister-in-law Frederica of Hanover. She died on 1 June 2015, aged 77, three days before the death of her sister-in-law Monika, Dowager Princess of Hanover.

== Professional life ==
Alexandra represented the Frankfurt district of Niederrad on the Frankfurt City Council since 1980. She lastly served as the Chairwoman of the Culture and Leisure Committee.
