= Prince Ernest Augustus of Hanover (born 1914) =

Ernest Augustus
- Prince of Hanover; Hereditary Prince of Brunswick
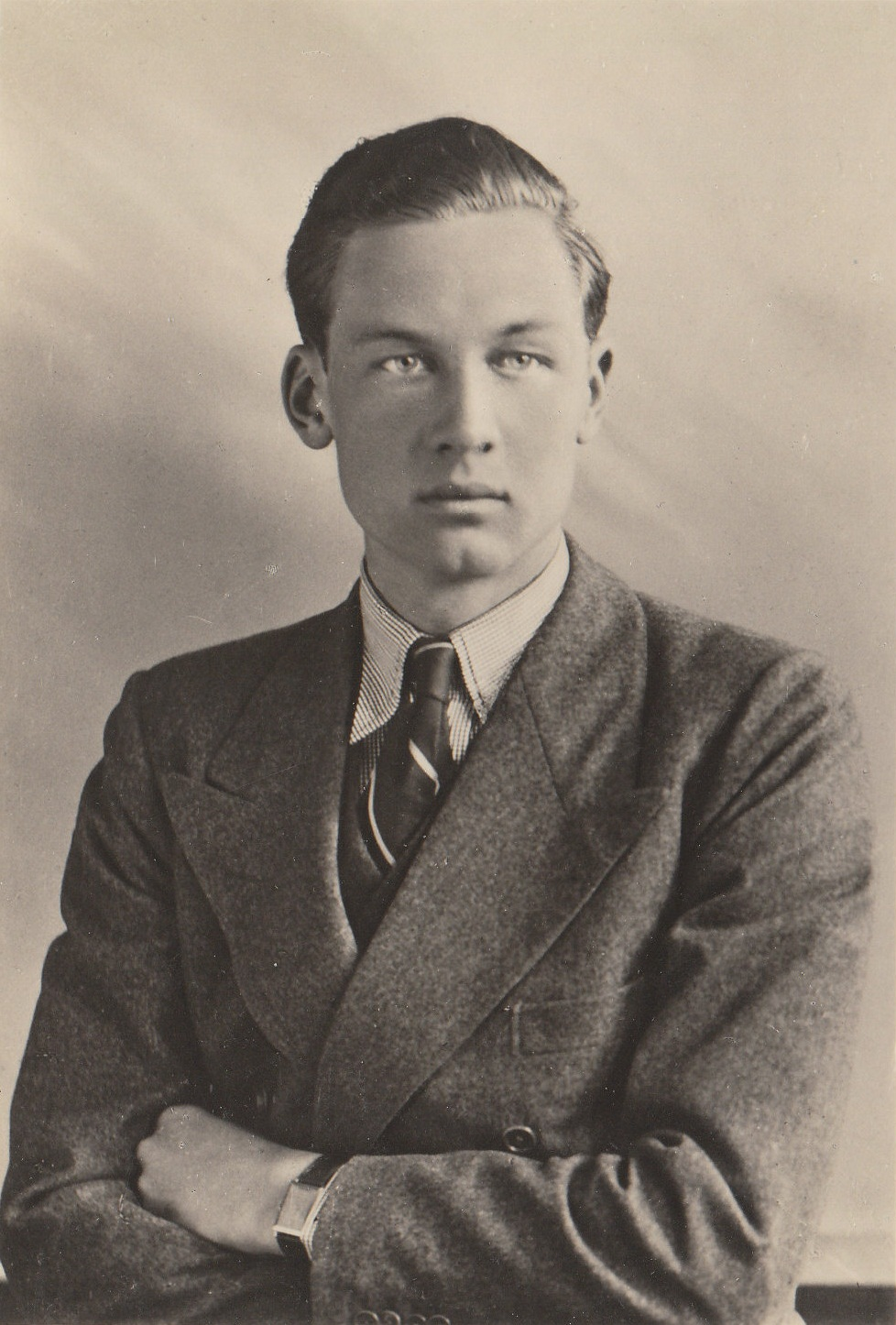
- Ernest Augustus in the 1930s

Head of the House of Hanover
- Reign: 30 January 1953 – 9 December 1987
- Predecessor: Duke Ernst August I
- Successor: Prince Ernst August
- Born: 18 March 1914; Braunschweig, Duchy of Brunswick, German Empire
- Died: 9 December 1987 (aged 73); Schulenburg, Pattensen, Lower Saxony, West Germany
- Burial: 11 December 1987; Schloss Marienburg, Germany
- Spouse: Princess Ortrud of Schleswig-Holstein-Sonderburg-Glücksburg (m. 1951; died 1980) Countess Monika zu Solms-Laubach (m. 1981)
- Issue: Christian von Humboldt-Dachroeden (illegitimate); Princess Marie; Prince Ernst August, Prince of Hanover; Prince Ludwig Rudolf; Princess Olga; Princess Alexandra, Princess of Leiningen; Prince Heinrich
Names
- Ernest Augustus George William Christian Louis Francis Joseph Nicholas Oscar; German: Ernst August Georg Wilhelm Christian Ludwig Franz Joseph Nikolaus Oskar Prinz von Hannover Herzog zu Braunschweig und Lüneburg Königlicher Prinz von Großbritannien und Irland
- House: Hanover
- Father: Ernest Augustus, Duke of Brunswick
- Mother: Princess Victoria Louise of Prussia
- Military career
- Allegiance: Nazi Germany
- Service: German Army
- Service years: 1941–1945
- Rank: Oberleutnant
- Conflicts: World War II

Ernst August, Hereditary Prince of Brunswick, Prince of Hanover (German: Ernst August Prinz von Hannover; 18 March 1914 – 9 December 1987) was head of the House of Hanover from 1953 until his death in 1987. From his birth until the German Revolution of 1918–1919 he was the heir apparent to the Duchy of Brunswick, a state of the German Empire.

He was born at Braunschweig, Germany, the eldest son of Ernest Augustus, Duke of Brunswick and Princess Viktoria Luise of Prussia, the only daughter of Emperor Wilhelm II, Ernest Augustus's third cousin in descent from George III the United Kingdom. Ernst August's parents were, therefore, third cousins, once removed. From his birth, he was the Hereditary Prince of Brunswick. He was also, shortly after birth in 1914, made a British prince by King George V of the United Kingdom, and was heir to the titles Duke of Cumberland and Teviotdale and Earl of Armagh. His German titles were abolished in 1919 by the Weimar Republic, while the British peerages to whom he was heir were suspended under the Titles Deprivation Act 1917.

== Life ==
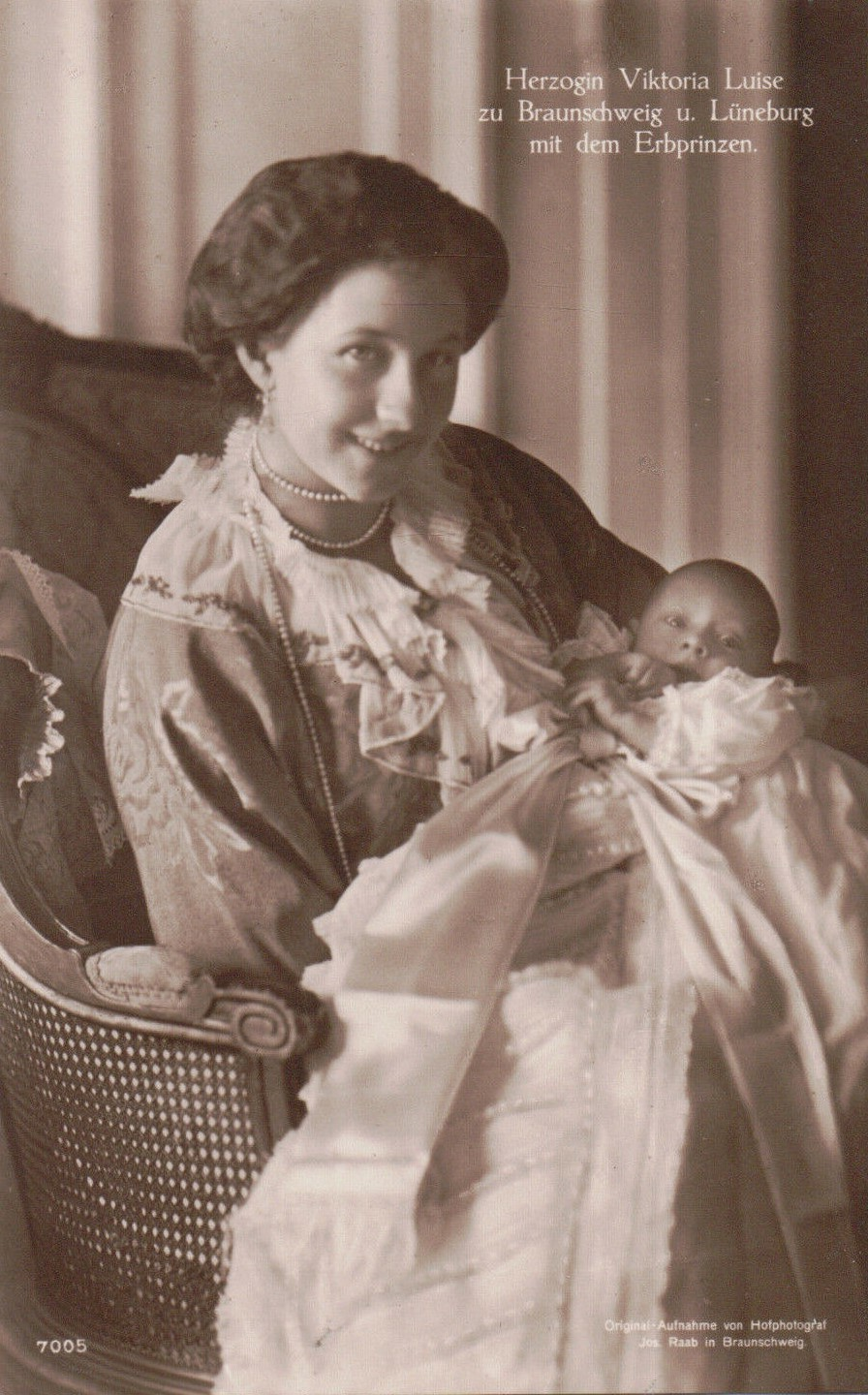
Ernest Augustus with his mother in 1914.

He ceased being heir to the duchy of Brunswick at the age of four, when his father abdicated in 1918. After his father's death in 1953, he became head of the House of Hanover.

During World War II, he fought at the Russian Front as Oberleutnant in the staff of Generaloberst Erich Hoepner. He was seriously injured near Kharkiv in spring 1943. After the 20 July plot in 1944, he was imprisoned for a few weeks by the Gestapo in Berlin.

He had joined the SS in 1933 and remained a member for one year. His official "denazification" certificate from 1949 vetting his Third Reich associations classified him as "a nominal Nazi supporter", without being a Nazi party member, and according to a Foreign Office record.

In 1938 his sister, Princess Frederica had married the later King Paul of Greece and in 1946 his younger brother Prince George William married Princess Sophie of Greece and Denmark, thus becoming the brother-in-law of Prince Philip, Duke of Edinburgh and Queen Elizabeth II of the United Kingdom.

Ernest Augustus was himself an heir to the British titles of Prince of Great Britain and Ireland, recognised ad personam for Ernst August's father as well as for him and his siblings by King George V of the United Kingdom on 17 June 1914, Duke of Cumberland and Teviotdale, Earl of Armagh, which however were all suspended under the Titles Deprivation Act 1917. In addition to being a German, he also held British nationality, after successfully claiming it under the Sophia Naturalization Act 1705 in the case of Attorney-General v. Prince Ernest Augustus of Hanover. Nonetheless, a problem arose as foreign royal titles cannot be entered into a British passport. Therefore, the titles Prince of Hanover, Duke of Brunswick and Lüneburg could not be mentioned there, nor could the British titles due to the Titles Deprivation Act 1917. The name which was finally entered into his British documents, was thus Ernest Augustus Guelph, with the addition of His Royal Highness. Guelph is thus also the British last name of his siblings and children, all styled Royal Highnesses in the United Kingdom.

In 1961 he sold his remaining properties at Herrenhausen Gardens, including the site of Herrenhausen Palace which had been destroyed by a British bombing raid in 1943. He kept however the Princely House, a small palace built in 1720 by George I of Great Britain for his daughter Anna Louise. Ernest Augustus converted Marienburg Castle into a museum in 1954, after having moved to nearby Calenberg Demesne, which caused a row with his mother, who was forced to move out. He also sold the family's exile seat, Cumberland Castle at Gmunden, Austria, to the state of Upper Austria in 1979, but his family foundation based in Liechtenstein kept vast forests, a game park, a hunting lodge, The Queen's Villa and other property at Gmunden. The family property is now managed by his grandson Ernst August.

== Marriage and children ==
In 1941 during the Second World War, his cousin Prince Hubertus of Prussia married the noted society beauty and German aristocrat Baroness Maria Anna von Humboldt-Dacheröden (1916–2003). The couple, however, divorced in 1943, after her affair with Ernest Augustus resulted in the birth of a son. Ernest Augustus however did not marry Maria Anna because his parents would not have approved, since she was considered of inadequate birth and was also a divorcée, and the marriage would have made his younger brother Prince George William heir to the headship of the House of Hanover. The child, christened Christian Ernst August Hubertus, Freiherr von Humboldt-Dachroeden, was born in 1943 and is currently a bank consultant.

On 5 September 1951, Ernest Augustus married Princess Ortrud of Schleswig-Holstein-Sonderburg-Glücksburg (1925–1980). The wedding was attended by many important royal figures, including his sister Queen Frederica and her husband King Paul of Greece, and the heads of the houses of Saxony, Hesse, Mecklenburg, Oldenburg, and Baden. The wedding was followed with a reception in the Gallery Building at Herrenhausen Gardens, the only part of the House of Hanover's former summer palace still intact, as the palace itself had been burned down during World War II.

His children by his first wife are:

- Princess Marie of Hanover (born 26 November 1952), married Count Michael Georg von Hochberg-Fürstenstein (b. 1943) and had issue.
- Prince Ernst August of Hanover (born 1954), married firstly Chantal Hochuli (b. 1955) and had issue, married secondly Princess Caroline of Monaco and had issue.
- Prince Ludwig Rudolf of Hanover (1955–1988), married Countess Isabelle von Thurn und Valsássina-Como-Vercelli (1962–1988), with whom he had one son. Ludwig died of suicide shortly after discovering the body of his wife, who had died of a drug overdose.
- Princess Olga of Hanover (born 17 February 1958)
- Princess Alexandra of Hanover (born 18 February 1959), married Andreas, 8th Prince of Leiningen (b. 1955) and had issue.
- Prince Heinrich of Hanover (born 1961), married Thyra Donata Sixtina von Westernhagen and had issue.

In 1954, the couple, together with Ernest Augustus's three younger brothers, took part in the ship tour organized by his sister, Queen Frederica, and her husband King Paul of Greece, which became known as the "Cruise of the Kings" and was attended by over 100 royals from all over Europe.

Princess Ortrud died in 1980.

Ernest Augustus married again in 1981, Countess Monika zu Solms-Laubach (1929–2015), daughter of Georg, 9th Count of Solms-Laubach (1899–1969) and his wife, Princess Johanna of Solms-Hohensolms-Lich (1905–1982).

He died at Schulenburg, Pattensen, Lower Saxony, Germany, aged 73, and was buried next to his first wife on a round bastion of Marienburg Castle (Hanover).

== In popular culture ==
He was portrayed by Daniel Betts in the first season of the Netflix series The Crown.

== Ancestry ==
Ancestors of Prince Ernest Augustus of Hanover (born 1914)

8. George V of Hanover
4. Ernest Augustus, Crown Prince of Hanover
9. Princess Marie of Saxe-Altenburg
2. Ernest Augustus, Duke of Brunswick
10. Christian IX of Denmark
5. Princess Thyra of Denmark
11. Princess Louise of Hesse-Kassel
1. Ernest Augustus, Hereditary Prince of Brunswick
12. Frederick III, German Emperor
6. Wilhelm II, German Emperor
13. Victoria, Princess Royal
3. Princess Victoria Louise of Prussia
14. Frederick VIII, Duke of Schleswig-Holstein
7. Princess Augusta Victoria of Schleswig-Holstein-Sonderburg-Augustenburg
15. Princess Adelheid of Hohenlohe-Langenburg

== Notes ==
Prince Ernest Augustus of Hanover (born 1914) House of Hanover Cadet branch of the House of Welf Born: 18 March 1914 Died: 9 December 1987
Titles in pretence
Preceded by Ernest Augustus, Duke of Brunswick	— TITULAR — King of Hanover; 30 January 1953 – 9 December 1987; Reason for succession failure: Hanover annexed by Prussia in 1866	Succeeded by Ernest Augustus, Prince of Hanover
Preceded by Ernest Augustus, Duke of Brunswick	— TITULAR — Duke of Brunswick; 30 January 1953 – 9 December 1987; Reason for succession failure: Duchy abolished in 1918	Succeeded by Ernest Augustus, Prince of Hanover
