= Prince Christian of Hanover =

German prince (born 1985)

Prince Christian
- Born: 1 June 1985 (age 41); Hildesheim, Lower Saxony, West Germany
- Spouse: Alessandra de Osma (m. 2018)
- Issue: 3
Names
- Christian Heinrich Clemens Paul Frank Peter Welf Wilhelm-Ernst Friedrich Franz
- House: Hanover
- Father: Ernst August, Prince of Hanover
- Mother: Chantal Hochuli

Prince Christian of Hanover (Christian Heinrich Clemens Paul Frank Peter Welf Wilhelm-Ernst Friedrich Franz; born 1 June 1985) is a German prince in pretense, the younger son of Ernst August Prinz von Hannover, and his first wife, Chantal Hochuli.

== Early life ==
Hanover was born Christian Heinrich Clemens Paul Frank Peter Welf Wilhelm-Ernst Friedrich Franz on 1 June 1985 in Hildesheim, Lower Saxony, West Germany. His parents, Ernst August von Hannover and Chantal Hochuli, an heiress to a Swiss chocolate company, divorced on 23 October 1997. Less than two years later, on 23 January 1999, his father married Princess Caroline of Monaco.

== Personal life ==
On 24 November 2017, Christian married Peruvian lawyer Alessandra de Osma in a civil service at the Chelsea and Westminster register office in London. The couple celebrated their religious wedding on 16 March 2018 at Basilica of San Pedro, in Lima, with the Rev. Hans-Jürgen Hoeppke (IELP-Evangelical Lutheran Church of Peru; Christuskirche in Lima) and Bishop Norbert Klemens Strotmann of the diocese of Chosica officiating. After moving permanently to Madrid, the couple announced in March 2020 they were expecting a set of twins, and Alessandra gave birth on 7 July 2020 at Quirón Clinic in Pozuelo de Alarcón. Their third child, a daughter, was born on 16 February 2024. The couple live in the neighbourhood of Puerta de Hierro, near the eponymous club.

== Titles as surname ==
After the German Revolution of 1918–1919 and the establishment of the Weimar Republic in 1919, legal recognition of hereditary titles was abolished. Since the introduction of the Weimar Constitution, the use of titles in Germany has been unofficial, while legally they are retained only as surnames.
