= Sophia Naturalization Act 1705 =

Act of the Parliament of England

- Act of Parliament
- Parliament of England
- Long title: An Act for the Naturalization of the Most Excellent Princess Sophia, Electress and Duchess Dowager of Hanover, and the Issue of her Body.
- Citation: 4 & 5 Ann. c. 16 (Note: This is the citation in The Statutes of the Realm.); 4 Ann. c. 4 (Note: This is the citation in The Statutes at Large.)
- Territorial extent: England and Wales

Dates
- Royal assent: 21 December 1705
- Commencement: 25 October 1705 (Note: Start of session.)
- Repealed: 1 January 1949
Other legislation
| Repealed by | British Nationality Act 1948 |
| Relates to | Bill of Rights 1689; Act of Settlement 1701; Royal Marriages Act 1772 |

Status: Repealed

Text of statute as originally enacted

The Sophia Naturalization Act 1705 (4 & 5 Ann. c. 16) (long title Act for the Naturalization of the Most Excellent Princess Sophia, Electress and Duchess Dowager of Hanover, and the Issue of her Body) was an act of the Parliament of England in 1705. It followed the Act of Settlement 1701, whereby Dowager Electress Sophia of Hanover and her Protestant descendants were declared to be in the line of succession to the throne (her son George I later became king).

Sophia, a granddaughter of James VI of Scotland and I of England, was not considered to be an Englishwoman as she had not been born in England. The act naturalized her and "the issue of her body", provided they were not Catholic, as English subjects. Any person born to a descendant of Sophia could also claim to be the "issue of her body".

In 1947, Prince Frederick of Prussia succeeded in a claim under the act, having renounced his German citizenship.

The whole act was repealed by section 34(3) of the British Nationality Act 1948 (11 & 12 Geo. 6 c. 56), which came into force on 1 January 1949. However, any non-Catholic descendants of the Electress born before the repealing statute was enacted had already automatically acquired the status of a British subject, so there are still people alive who can claim British nationality under the Sophia Naturalization Act.

This was first tested between 1955 and 1957 when Prince Ernest Augustus of Hanover successfully claimed British nationality on this basis after considerable litigation. As he was born and was a Protestant while the act was in force, the courts recognised that he had already acquired citizenship, which the repeal of the statute did not affect. Alexander, Crown Prince of Yugoslavia was also given British citizenship using the Sophia Naturalization Act.

In the present time, however, most people likely to successfully claim citizenship in this manner would obtain the status of British Overseas citizen.

== See also ==
- Prince Philip, Duke of Edinburgh § Marriage (at Note 2)
- History of British nationality law
