= Haag =

Haag is a common Germanic place-name and personal name, which originally meant "hedge" or "fence", hence "enclosed area", such as a fenced hamlet, park or wood. Also Hagen, Hägen.

Haag may refer to:

== Places ==
- The Hague, in the Netherlands (Dutch: Den Haag)
- Several places in Germany:
  - Haag, Upper Franconia in the district of Bayreuth, Bavaria (Postcode 95473)
  - Haag an der Amper in the district of Freising, Bavaria (Postcode 85410)
  - Haag in Oberbayern in the district of Mühldorf, Bavaria (Postcode 83527)
  - Haag (Oberpfalz), near Hemau, Bavaria (Postcode 93155)
  - Haag (Hunsrück), part of the community of Morbach, Rhineland-Palatinate (Postcode 54497)
  - Haag (Dachau), a village belonging to Altomünster in the district of Dachau, Bavaria (Postcode 85250)
  - Schloss Haag, a castle near Geldern, NRW (Postcode 47608)
- Several places in Austria:
  - Haag am Hausruck, a market town in the district of Grieskirchen, Upper Austria (Postcode 4680)
  - Haag, Austria, a municipality in the Amstetten District, Lower Austria (Postcode 3350)
- Haag (Rheintal), Switzerland, part of Sennwald in the Canton of St. Gallen (Postcode 9469)
- Haag Township, Logan County, North Dakota, in the United States

== People ==
- Alfred Haag (1904–1982), German Communist and member of the resistance
- Anna Haag (born 1986), Swedish cross country skier
- Carl Haag (1820–1915), German-British painter
- Chase Haag (born 1975), Police Captain, Napa, Ca
- Emile Haag (born 1942) Luxembourgish historian, trade unionist
- Ernest van den Haag (1914–2002), Dutch-American sociologist best known for his contributions to the National Review
- Ernest Haag (1866–1935), American entrepreneur who started the Mighty Haag Circus
- Ervin Haág (1933–2018), Hungarian chess master
- John Haag (1926–2008), American writer
- Jules Haag (1882–1953), French mathematician
- Lina Haag (1907–2012) German anti-Fascist activist
- Marty Haag (1934–2004), the news director at the ABC station, WFAA-TV, in Dallas, Texas
- Rudolf Haag (1922–2016), German physicist, known for his contributions to the axiomatic formulation of quantum field theory
- Matthew Haag, (born 1992) American professional Call of Duty player and internet personality

== Other uses ==
- Haag's theorem a theorem in quantum field theory (physics)
- The Haag hexagon
