= TGW Logistics Group =

Austrian logistics company

TGW Logistics
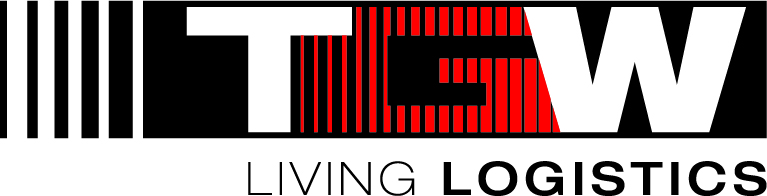

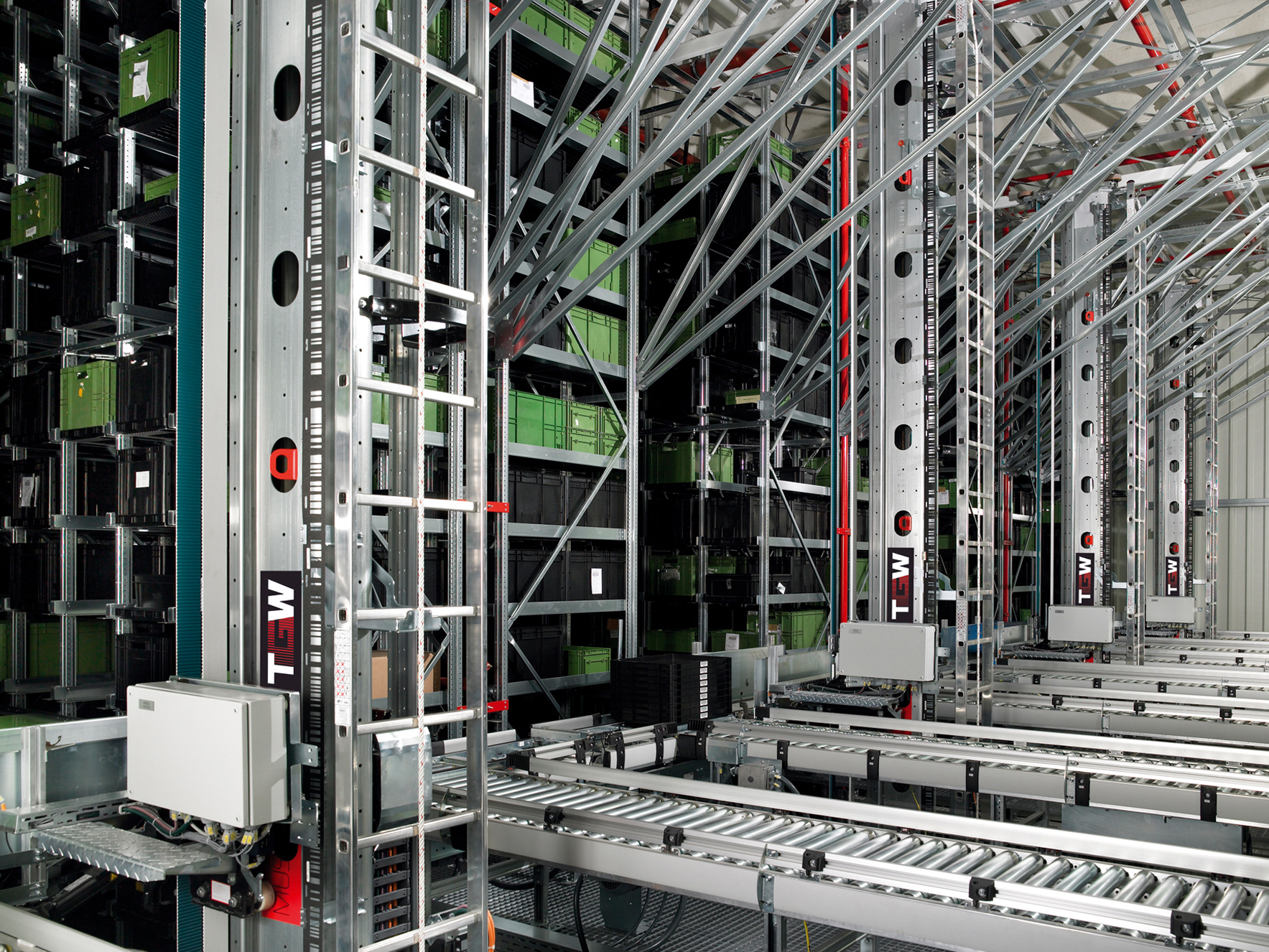
- Automated aisle bin warehouse with Mustang AS/R machines from TGW
- Type: GmbH
- Industry: Material handling
- Founded: 1969; 57 years ago
- Founder: Ludwig Szinicz and Heinz König
- Headquarters: Marchtrenk, Wels-Land District, Upper Austria, Austria
- Key people: Henry Puhl (CEO); Sebastian Wolf (CFO); Christoph Wolkerstorfer (CTO)
- Products: Systems integrator for automated warehouse systems
- Services: Systems design, Manufacturing, Implementation, Maintenance
- Revenue: 1.07 billion Euros (2024/2025)
- Number of employees: 4,600 (2024/25)
- Website: www.tgw-group.com

TGW Logistics is an Austrian company that supplies automated warehouse systems. The company designs, manufactures, implements and maintains end-to-end fulfillment systems - including systems such as goods receipt, storage, order picking and shipping.

It is headquartered in Marchtrenk, Austria. The company name TGW comes from its original German name Transportgeräte Wels which refers to the location (Wels) and the business area (Transportgeräte, which means transport equipment)

== History ==
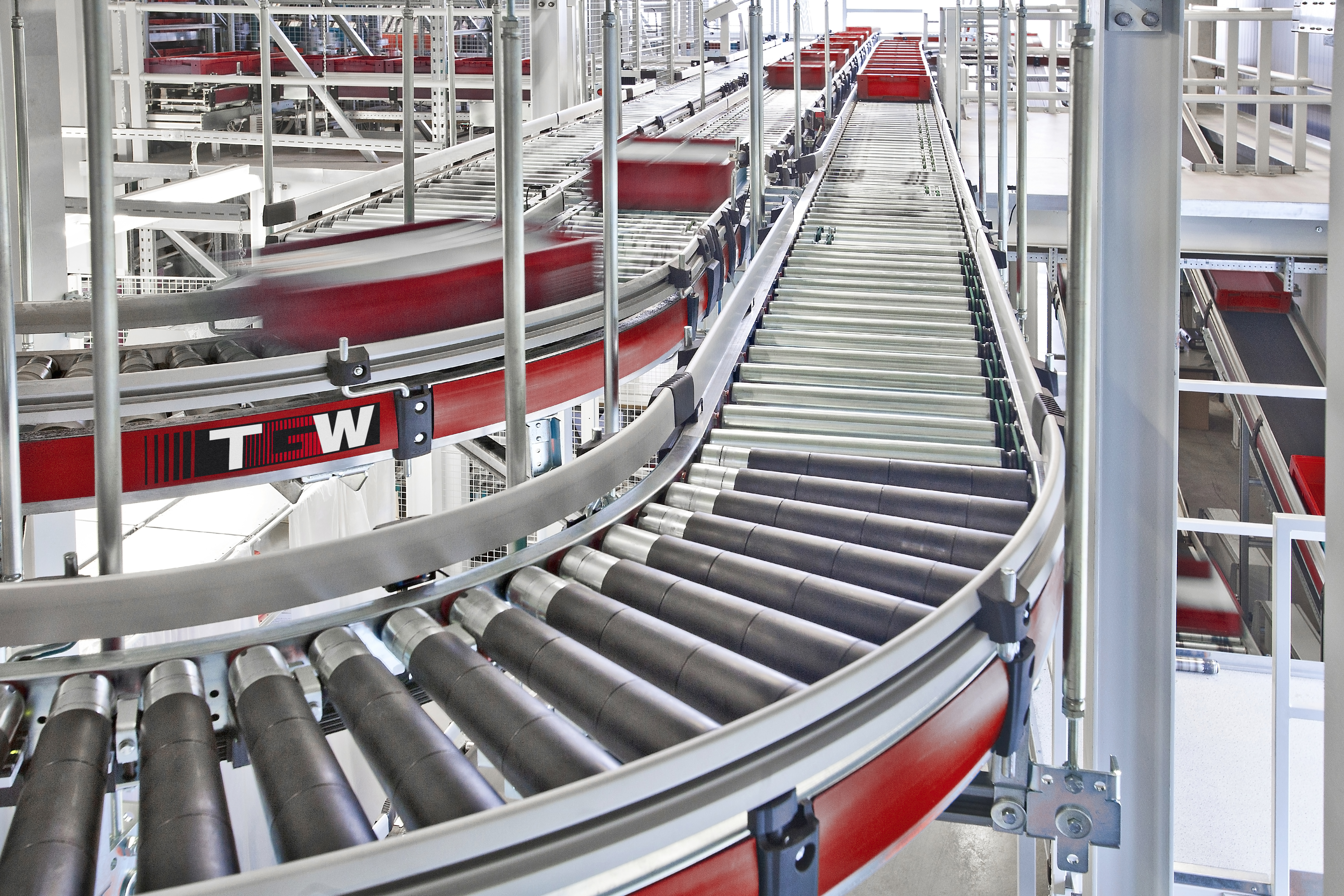
TGW KingDrive conveyor technology

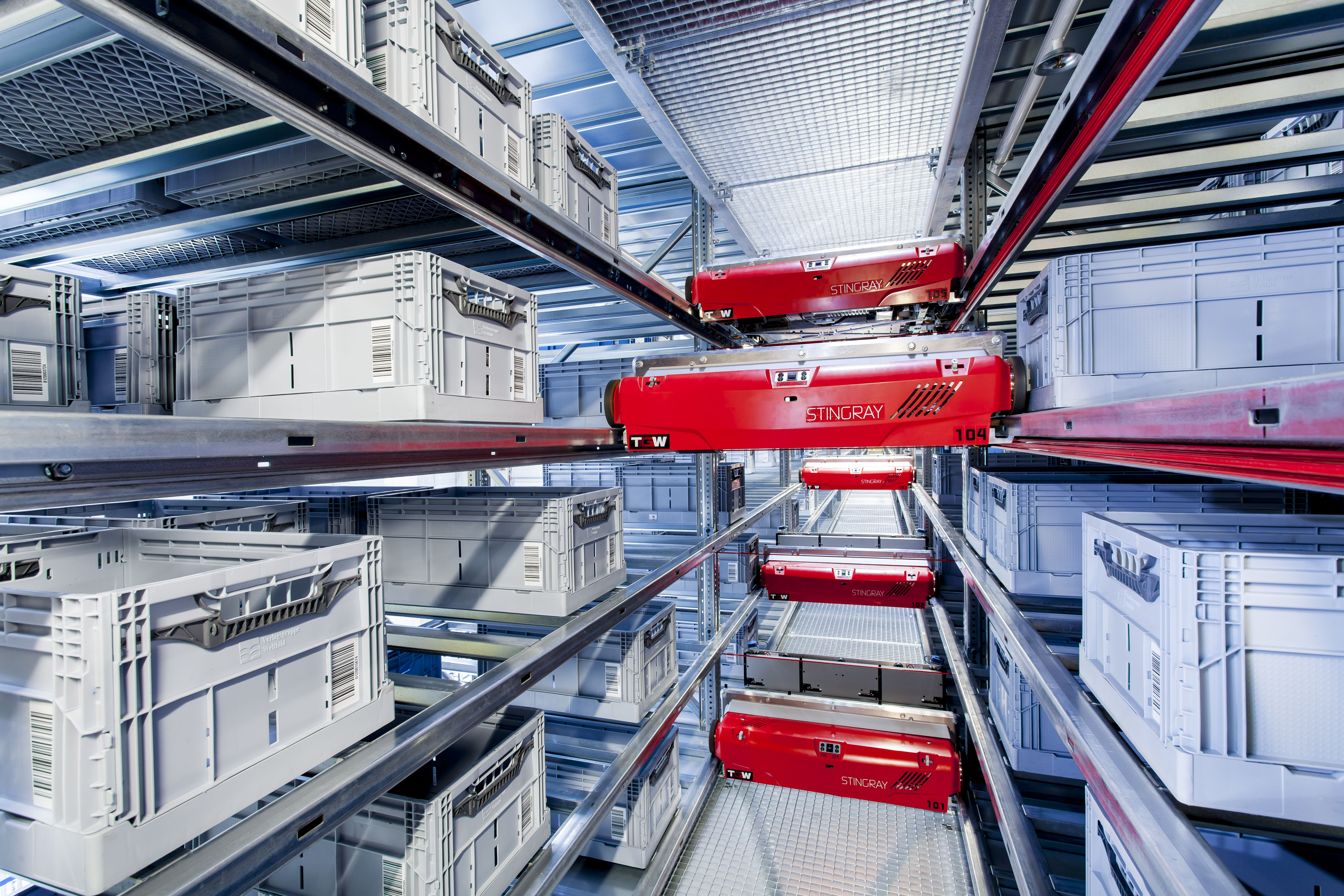
TGW Stingray shuttle system

The company was founded in 1969 by Ludwig Szinicz and Heinz König in Wels, Upper Austria. Initially, the two founders manufactured order picking trolleys and wheelbarrows with 10 employees - before developing the first conveyor belt in the company's history for a mail order company. This marked the entry into the warehouse automation business. The company's current headquarters are located in Marchtrenk, Upper Austria.

In 1987 the company opened its first subsidiary (TGW Transportgeräte GmbH) in Siegen (Germany). In 2001 TGW Systems Inc. was founded as a subsidiary in the United States. 2010 TGW opened offices in France and Sweden. In 2012 the company opened offices in China and Switzerland. In 2015, TGW Logistics opened another manufacturing site in Changzhou (China) followed by additional offices in the Netherlands.

In 2014 TGW acquired the material handling software company 'Klug GmbH'. Two years later 'CHM Automatisierungstechnik' became part of TGW Logistics- today known as 'TGW Robotics'. The company is specializing in robotics and automation technology.

In 2018, TGW Logistics opened its new headquarters 'TGW Evolution Park' in Marchtrenk, Austria. The five-story office building encompasses 248,000 square feet and offers amenities such as a company restaurant, a gym, a multi-functional activity garden and an on-site childcare facility. At the beginning of June 2018, the company headquarters were moved from Wels to Marchtrenk, and the location in Wels continues to exist. In the fall of 2024, the company announced that it would invest 100 million euros in the expansion of its headquarters: a 25,000 m² production hall and an automated warehouse will be built by summer 2026.

In the 2024/25 fiscal year the company generated revenues of 1.24 billion US dollars (1.07 billion Euros) and employed more than 4,600 people.

On November 3, 2017, the company announced that Harald Schröpf, previously COO, will succeed CEO Georg Kirchmayr. Due to differing views on the foundation's philosophy, the foundation's board of directors has decided to part ways with the previous CEO. He left the company at the beginning of November 2017.

In February 2024, Henry Puhl took over as CEO of TGW Logistics. In May 2025, Sebastian Wolf, CEO of firefighting equipment supplier Rosenbauer since 2022, joined the intralogistics specialist as CFO (Chief Financial Officer).

== Organizations structure ==
TGW Logistics Group is a holding company which has operational subsidiaries:

- TGW Logistics Group, Wels and Marchtrenk, Austria – Holding
- TGW Mechanics GmbH, Wels and Marchtrenk, Austria – Competence center for product development and manufacturing
- TGW Systems Integration GmbH, Wels and Marchtrenk, Austria – Systems integration unit for Middle, East and South Europe as well as competence center for Software and Controls
- TGW Robotics, Stephanskirchen, Germany – Competence center for robotics and automation technology
- TGW Transportgeräte GmbH, Langen, Germany – Sales office Germany
- TGW Software Services GmbH, Teunz, Germany – Competence center for software and controls
- TGW Systems Integration AG, Rotkreuz, Switzerland – Sales office Switzerland
- TGW Poland, Poznań, Poland – Sales Office Eastern Europe
- TGW Turkey Sistem Entegrasyonu Ltd.Sti., Istanbul, Turkey – Sales office South and Eastern Europe
- TGW Limited, Market Harborough, UK – Systems integration unit for the United Kingdom, the Benelux and Scandinavia
- TGW Scandinavia, Hobro, Denmark – Sales office Denmark
- TGW Scandinavia AB, Västra Frölunda, Sweden – Sales office Scandinavia
- TGW Benelux, Roosendaal, the Netherlands – Sales office Benelux
- TGW France SAS, Blagnac, France – Sales office France
- TGW Ibérica Sistemas Logísticos S.L., Sant Just Desvern (Barcelona), Spain – Systems integration unit for Spain, Middle and South America
- TGW Italia Srl, Spilamberto (Modena), Italy – Sales office Italy
- TGW Systems Inc., Grand Rapids, Michigan, USA – Systems integration unit for North America
- TGW China Co. Ltd., Shanghai, China – Systems integration unit for Asia and Australia
- TGW Logistics Equipment Production (Changzhou) Co., Ltd., Changzhou, China – Competence center for manufacturing

As of 2020, TGW came 11th among the top 20 materials handling systems suppliers published by Modern Materials Handling in 2020.
