= Aichkirchen =

Aichkirchen may refer to:

- Aichkirchen, Austria, a municipality in Upper Austria, Austria
- Aichkirchen, Germany, a village in Bavaria, Germany
