= Offenhausen =

Offenhausen may refer to:

- Offenhausen, Austria
- Offenhausen, Germany
