= TGW =

TGW may refer to:

- Scoot, Singaporean low-cost airline (ICAO airline code)
- Takanawa Gateway Station, JR East station code
- TGW Logistics Group
- Transit Gateway in AWS VPC
