= Canting arms =

Heraldry representing the owner's name

A famous early example of canting arms: the castle representing the Kingdom of Castile and the lion representing the Kingdom of León.

Canting arms are heraldic bearings that represent the bearer's name (or, less often, some attribute or function) in a visual pun or rebus.

The expression derives from the latin cantare (to sing). French heralds used the term armes parlantes (English: "talking arms"), as they would sound out the name of the armiger. Many armorial allusions require research for elucidation because of changes in language and dialect that have occurred over the past millennium.

Canting arms – some in the form of rebuses – are quite common in German civic heraldry. They have also been increasingly used in the 20th century among the British royal family. When the visual representation is expressed through a rebus, this is sometimes called a rebus coat of arms. An in-joke among the Society for Creative Anachronism heralds is the pun, "Heralds don't pun; they cant."

== Examples of canting arms ==
=== Personal coats of arms ===
A famous example of canting arms are those of Queen Elizabeth The Queen Mother's paternal family, the Bowes-Lyon family. The arms (pictured below) contain the bows and blue lions that make up the arms of the Bowes and Lyon families.

Bowes-Lyon family: bows and lions

Princess Beatrice of York: Beatrice = bee thrice = three bees

Rosetti family: three roses

Quintin Hogg, Baron Hailsham of St Marylebone: three hog's heads

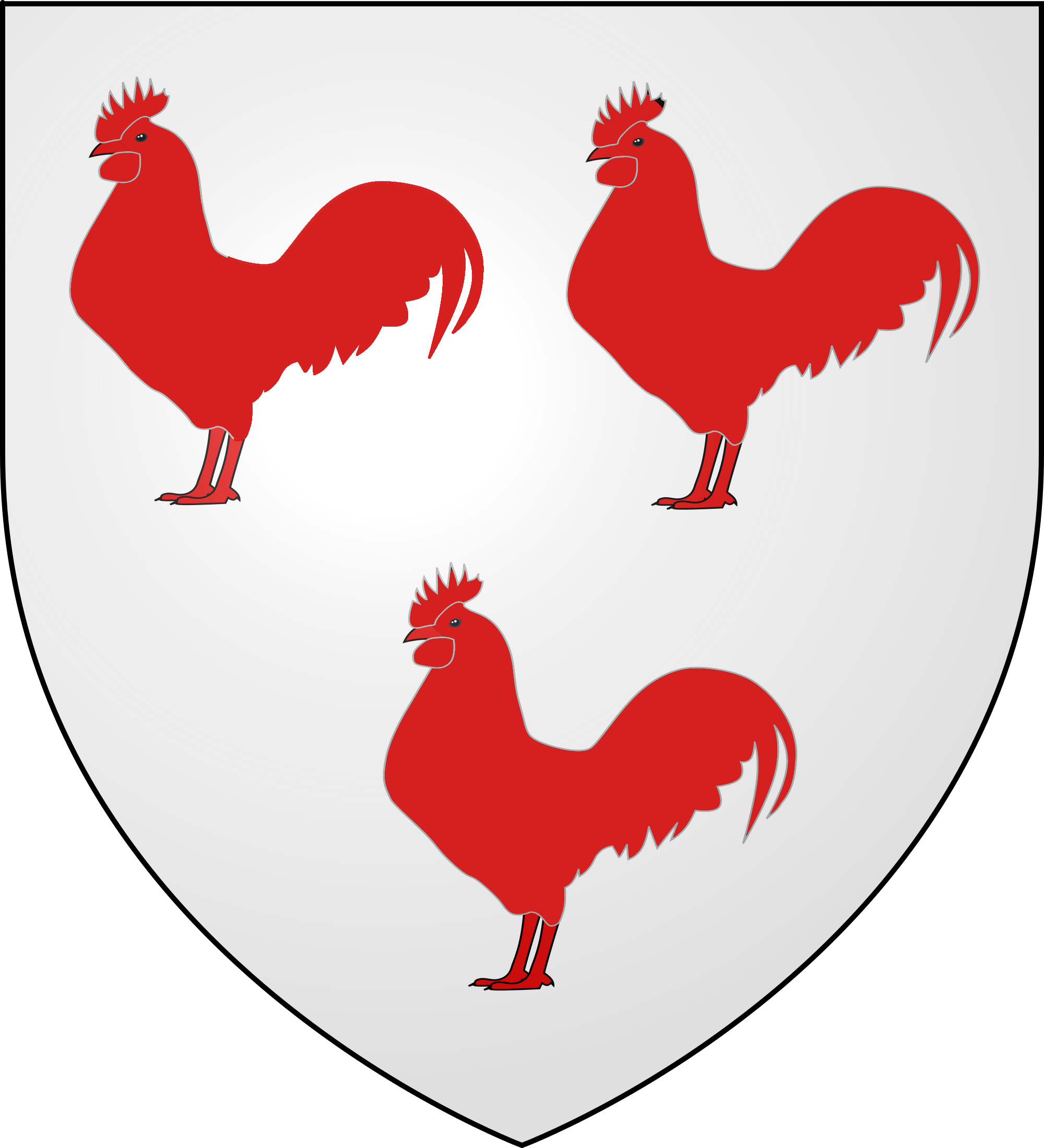
Cockburn: three red cocks

Crowninshield family: crown in shield

De Barry family: three bars gemelles

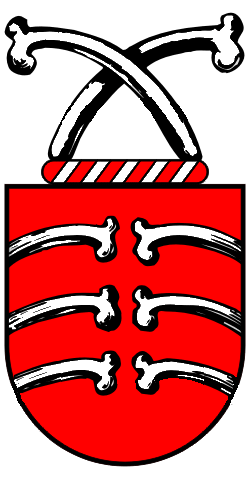
Coat of arms of the head of the Portuguese Costa family: costa means "rib" in Latin and Portuguese

President Dwight D. Eisenhower: a blacksmith's anvil, as Eisenhauer is German for "iron-hewer"

Flag of Maryland, originally the arms of George Calvert, 1st Baron Baltimore, whose mother's maiden name was Crossland; the latter's arms shows a cross.

Theodore Roosevelt: roses in a field, from the Dutch

Maus family: a mouse in the first and fourth quarters.

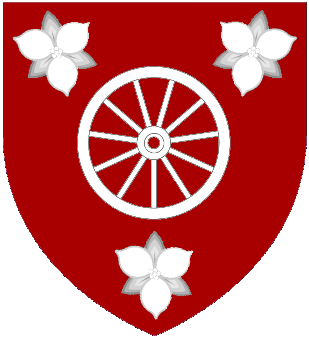
Anthony Rota: rota means "wheel" in Latin

Edwin Forrest: Three trees and a tree crest (forest)

Arms of the Campdavaine branch of the counts of Saint-Pol: a sheaf of oats (Camp d'avaine means field of oats in that family's Picard language [Champ d'avoine in Paris French]).

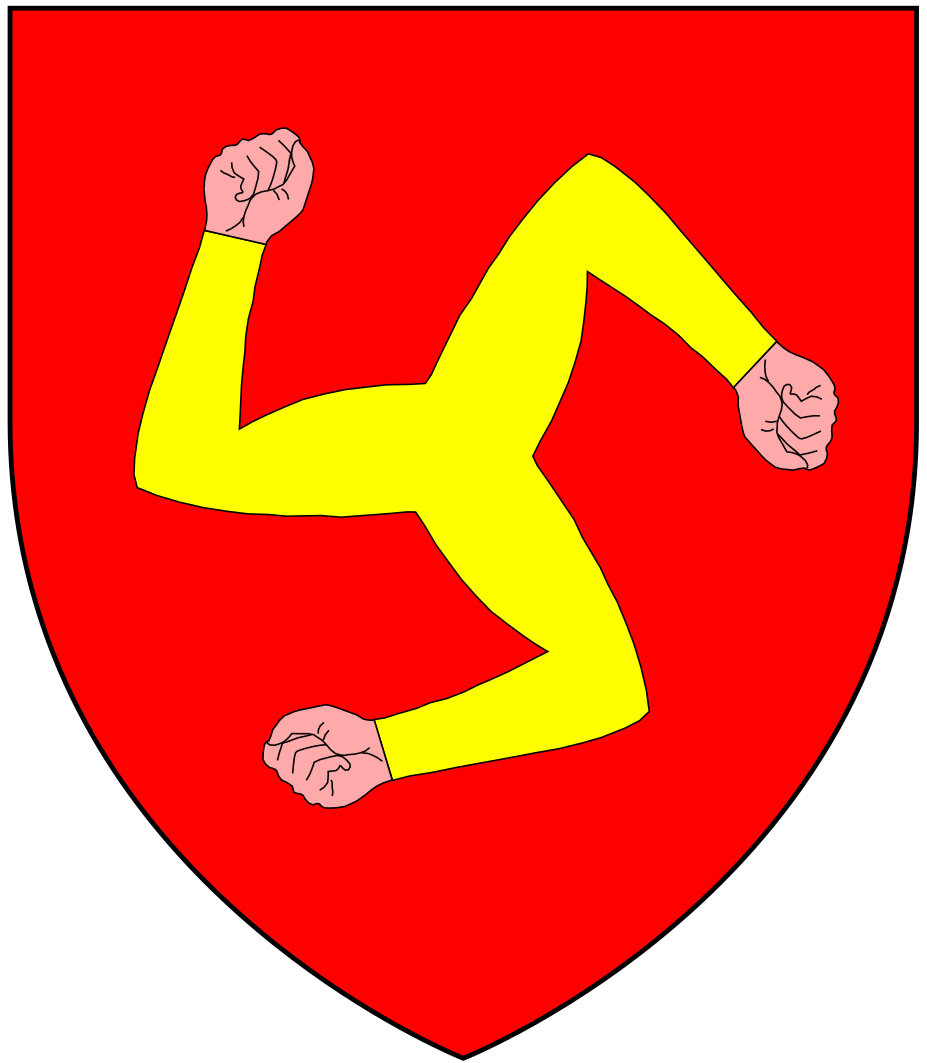
Tremayne of Collacombe: Gules, three dexter arms conjoined at the shoulders and flexed in triangle Or, the fists clenched argent. Canting arms from French trois mains ("three hands")

=== Municipal coats of arms ===
Municipal coats of arms which interpret the town's name in rebus form are also called canting. Here are a few examples.

The arms of Berwickshire, Scotland: Bear and wych elm

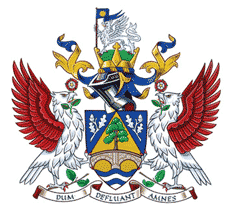
Elmbridge, Surrey (1974): elm tree on bridge. (The toponym is related to bridges but not to elms; the prefix refers to Emel, a former name for the river Mole.)

Châteaurenard: Château = castle; Renard = fox

Eberbach (1976): Eber = boar; Bach = brook (wavy blue fess)

The coat of arms of the village of Hensbroek in North Holland interprets the toponym as "hen-breeches" (the toponym is unrelated to either "hen" or "breeches", deriving from the personal name Hein and the Dutch cognate of "brook", i.e. "Henry's brook".)

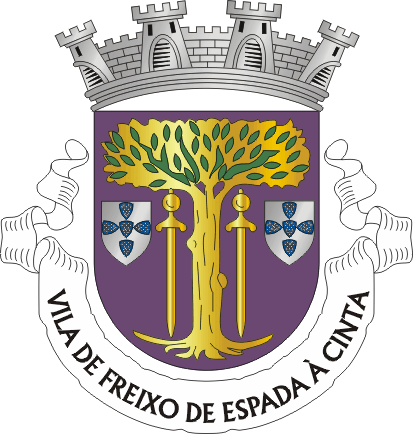
Freixo de Espada à Cinta (1926): Freixo = ash (tree); de Espada = with sword; à Cinta = at the waist, in Portuguese

Falkenberg (1948): Falken = falcon; Berg = hill, in Swedish

Seinäjoki (1951): Finnish: seinä = wall, joki = river

Arms of Kontiolahti featuring a bear (Finnish: karhu or kontio), carrying a log driving pike pole referring to the importance of forestry in the region's economy

Berlin (1954): Bär = bear

City and canton of Bern: Bär = Bear

Manacor: man a cor = hand with heart, in Catalan

Torrevieja (1829): Torre = tower, vieja = old

Kryvyi Rih: Kryvyi = crooked, Rih = horn, in Ukrainian

Rueda (1986): rueda = wheel in Spanish

Łódź: Łódź = boat

Wolfsburg: Wolf's Castle

Arms of Magenta, France, feature a bend sinister in magenta, an extremely rare tincture in heraldry

Örnsköldsvik (1894): örn = eagle, sköld = shield and vik = Bay.

Füssen: Füße = feet

Schaffhausen: Schaf = sheep, Haus = house

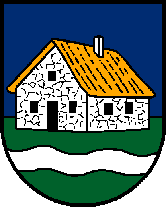
Steinhaus: Stein = stone, Haus = house

Schattendorf: Schatten = shadow, Dorf = village

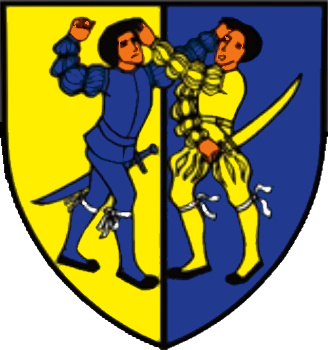
Hadersdorf-Kammern: Hader = quarrel, Dorf = village

The arms of Dornbirn feature pears, Birnen in German

The arms of Kotka feature an eagle (Finnish: kotka)

An example of canting arms outside Europe: the Malaysian city of Kuching features a cat on its municipal coat of arms, kuc(h)ing being the Malay word for cat

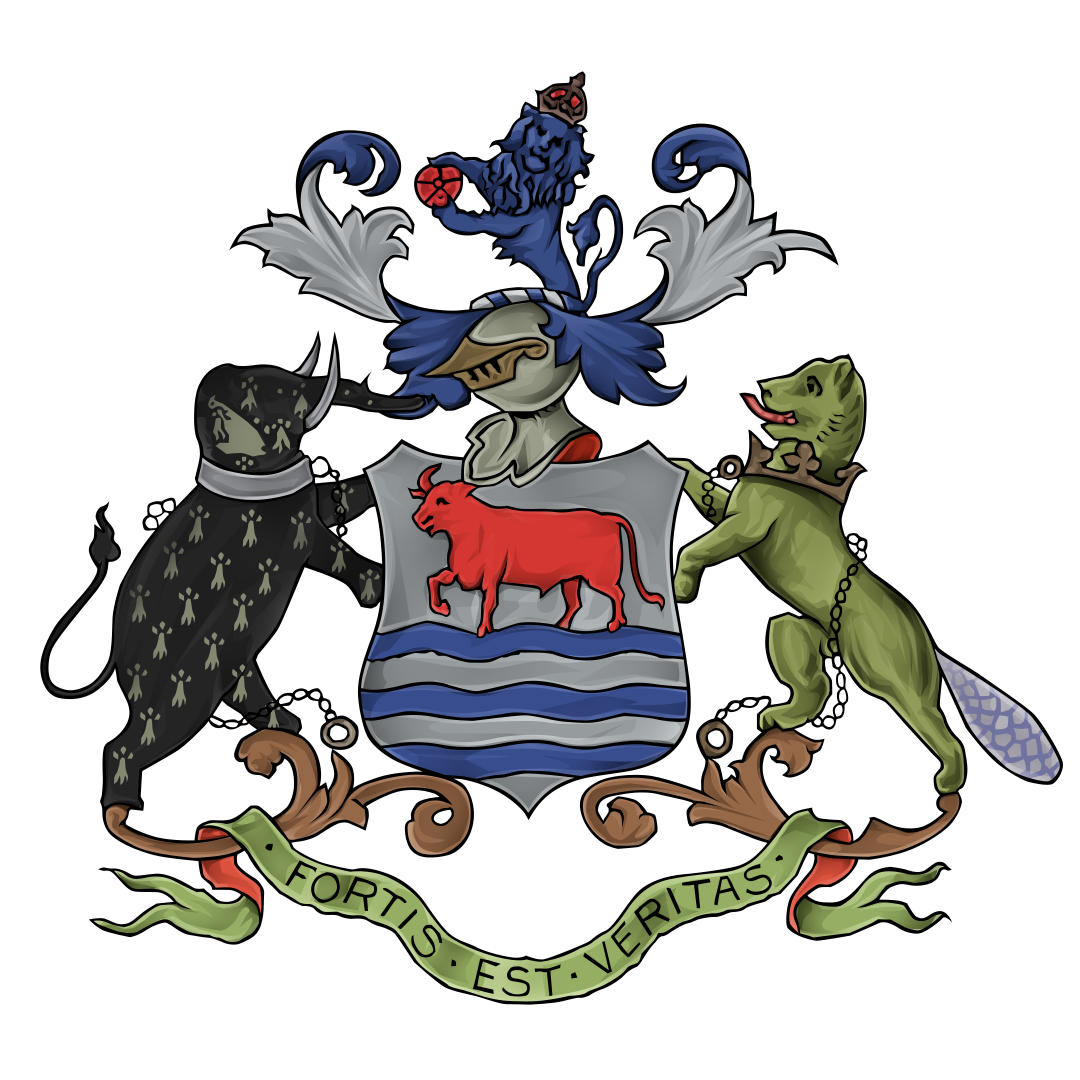
Oxford's arms, showing an ox in a ford on the escutcheon

=== Ecclesiastical coats of arms ===
The arms of the Diocese of Lansing: The lances crossed per saltire are a play on the name of the see, the city of Lansing, Michigan.

The arms of the Diocese of Rockville Centre: The mounds in the circle at the center of the arms are a play on the name of city in which the diocese is based, Rockville Centre, New York.

The arms of the Diocese of Baton Rouge: The shield features a red baton, referencing the city name, Baton Rouge, Louisiana, and its literal French meaning.

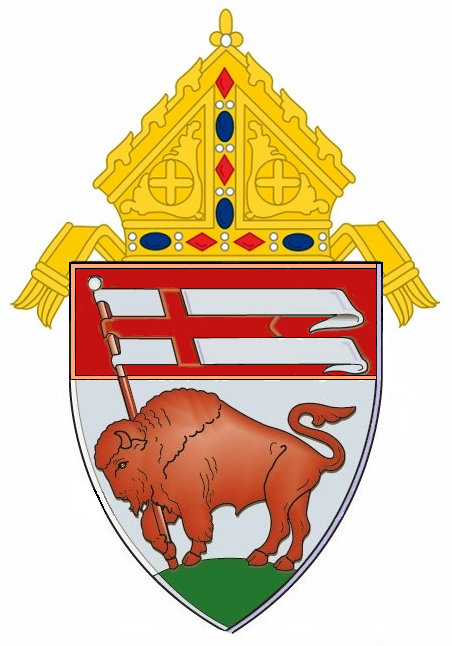
The arms of the Diocese of Buffalo: The arms feature an American bison, colloquially called a buffalo, carrying a banner of the Cross of St. George (analogous to the heraldic Lamb of God), referencing the name of city in which the see is based, Buffalo, New York.

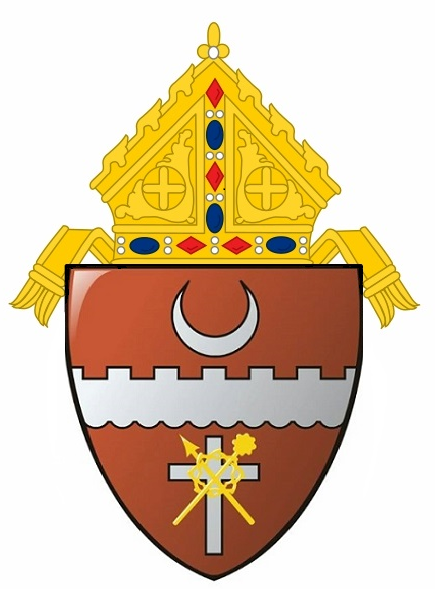
The arms of the Diocese of Brownsville: The tincture of the field, tenné, is depicted as brown, referencing the seat of the diocese, Brownsville, Texas.

The arms of the Diocese of Phoenix: The arms feature a phoenix, the namesake of the diocesan seat, Phoenix, Arizona.

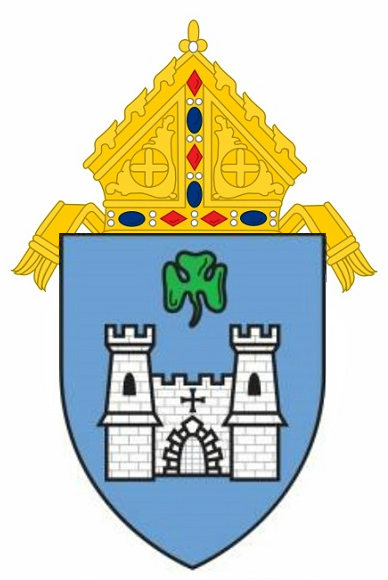
The arms of the Diocese of Fort Worth: The arms feature a castle, referencing the fort for which the city, Fort Worth, Texas, was named.

The arms of the Archdiocese of Anchorage: The anchor references the namesake of the see, Anchorage, Alaska.

The arms of the Archdiocese of Hartford: The arms feature a hart, a male deer, in the midst of flowing water, i.e., fording a body of water, referencing the name of the see, Hartford, Connecticut.

The arms of the Archdiocese of Los Angeles: The arms feature three pairs of wings, denoting three angels, and referencing the namesake of the see, Los Angeles, California, which translates to "the angels."

== See also ==
- Japanese rebus monogram

== Sources ==
- Winifred Hall: Canting and Allusive Arms of England and Wales. 1966. ISBN 9780900023019
