= Stadl-Paura =

- Municipality
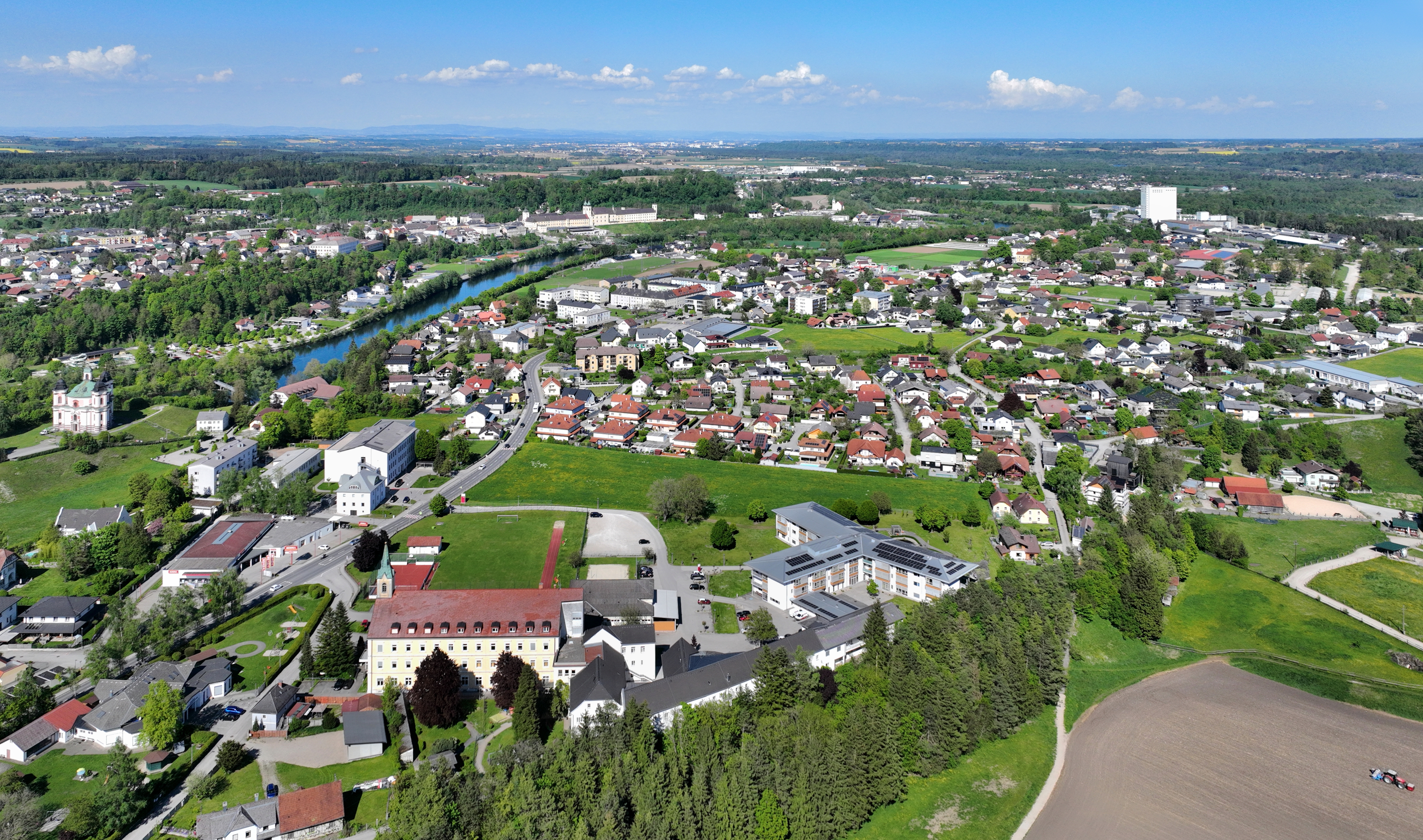
- Southwest view of Stadl-Paura

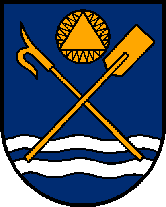
- Coat of arms

- Location within Austria
- Coordinates: 48°05′02″N 13°51′50″E
- Country: Austria
- State: Upper Austria
- District: Wels-Land

Government
  - Mayor: Christian Popp (FPÖ)

Area
  - Total: 15.05 km^{2} (5.81 sq mi)
- Elevation: 360 m (1,180 ft)

Population (2018-01-01)
  - Total: 5,053
  - Density: 335.7/km^{2} (869.6/sq mi)
- Time zone: UTC+1 (CET)
  - Summer (DST): UTC+2 (CEST)
- Postal code: 4651
- Area code: 07245
- Vehicle registration: WL
- Website: www.stadl-paura.at

Stadl-Paura is a municipality in the Austrian state of Upper Austria located in the district Wels-Land. About half of it lies in the Hausruckviertel, the other half in the Traunviertel. Officially, however, the whole district Wels-Land is considered part of the Hausruckviertel.

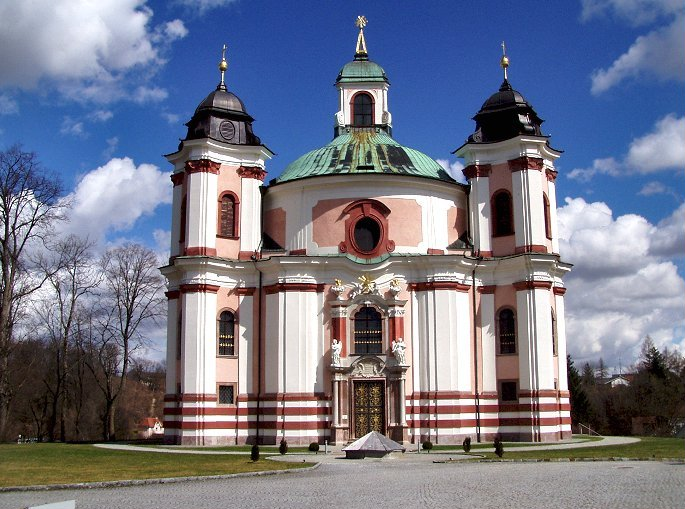
Church of Holy Trinity

Population development
Year	Inhabitants	Change%
1869	2.625	---
1880	2.421	-7,8
1890	2.601	+7,4
1900	2.672	+2,7
1910	2.840	+6,3
1923	2.905	+2,3
1934	3.155	+8,6
1939	2.976	-5,7
1951	6.093	+104,7
1961	4.691	-23,0
1971	4.841	+3,2
1981	4.744	-2,0
1991	4.838	+2,0
2001	4.866	+0,6
