= Neukirchen bei Lambach =

- Municipality
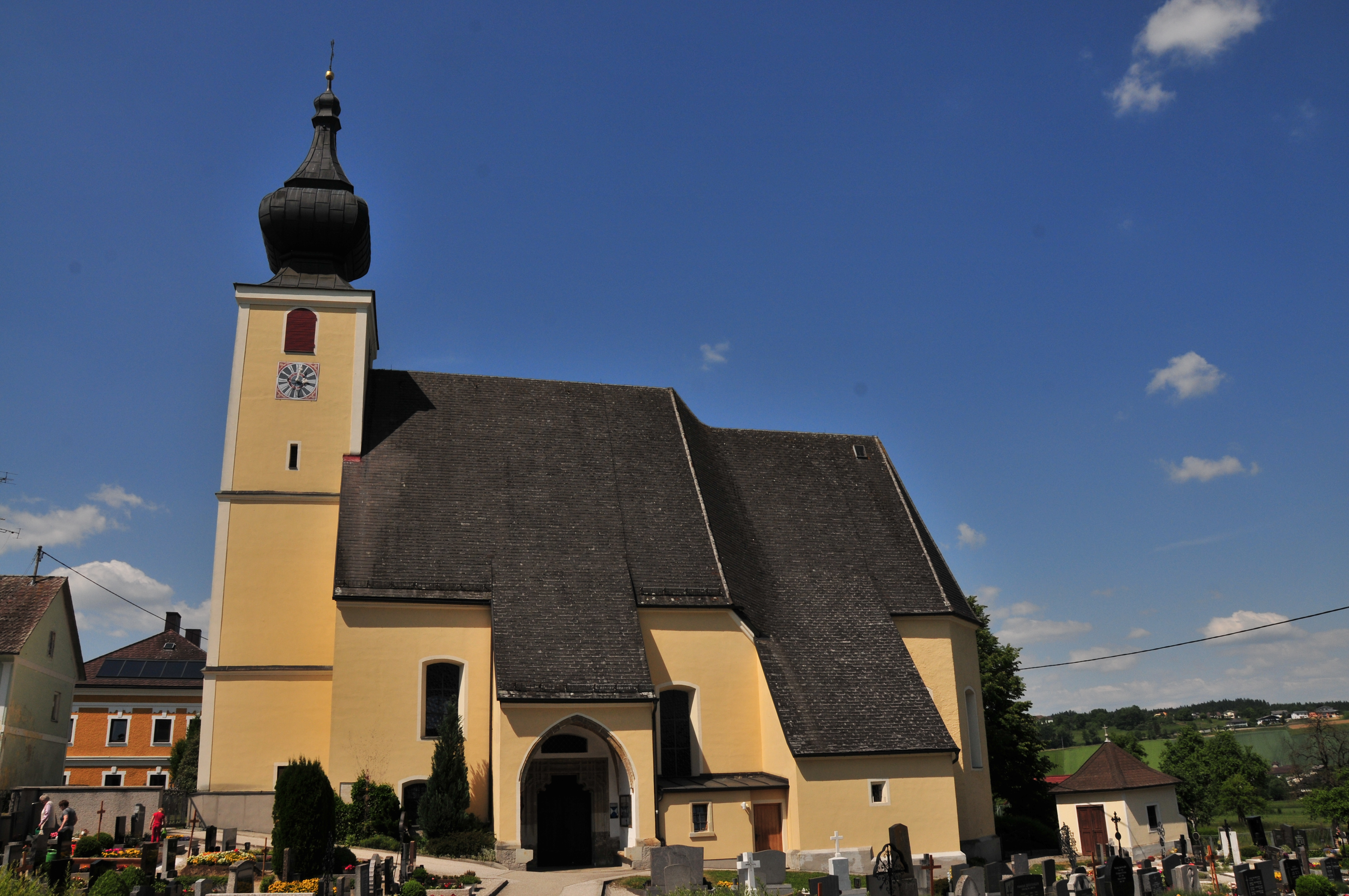

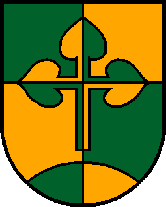
- Coat of arms

- Location within Austria
- Coordinates: 48°06′03″N 13°49′00″E
- Country: Austria
- State: Upper Austria
- District: Wels-Land

Government
  - Mayor: Andreas Obermayr (ÖVP)

Area
  - Total: 11.85 km^{2} (4.58 sq mi)
- Elevation: 401 m (1,316 ft)

Population (2018-01-01)
  - Total: 917
  - Density: 77.4/km^{2} (200/sq mi)
- Time zone: UTC+1 (CET)
  - Summer (DST): UTC+2 (CEST)
- Postal code: 4671
- Area code: 07245
- Vehicle registration: WL

Neukirchen bei Lambach is a municipality in the district of Wels-Land in the Austrian state of Upper Austria.

== Population ==
Historical population
Year	Pop.	±%
1991	799	—
2001	830	+3.9%
