= Bachmanning =

- Municipality
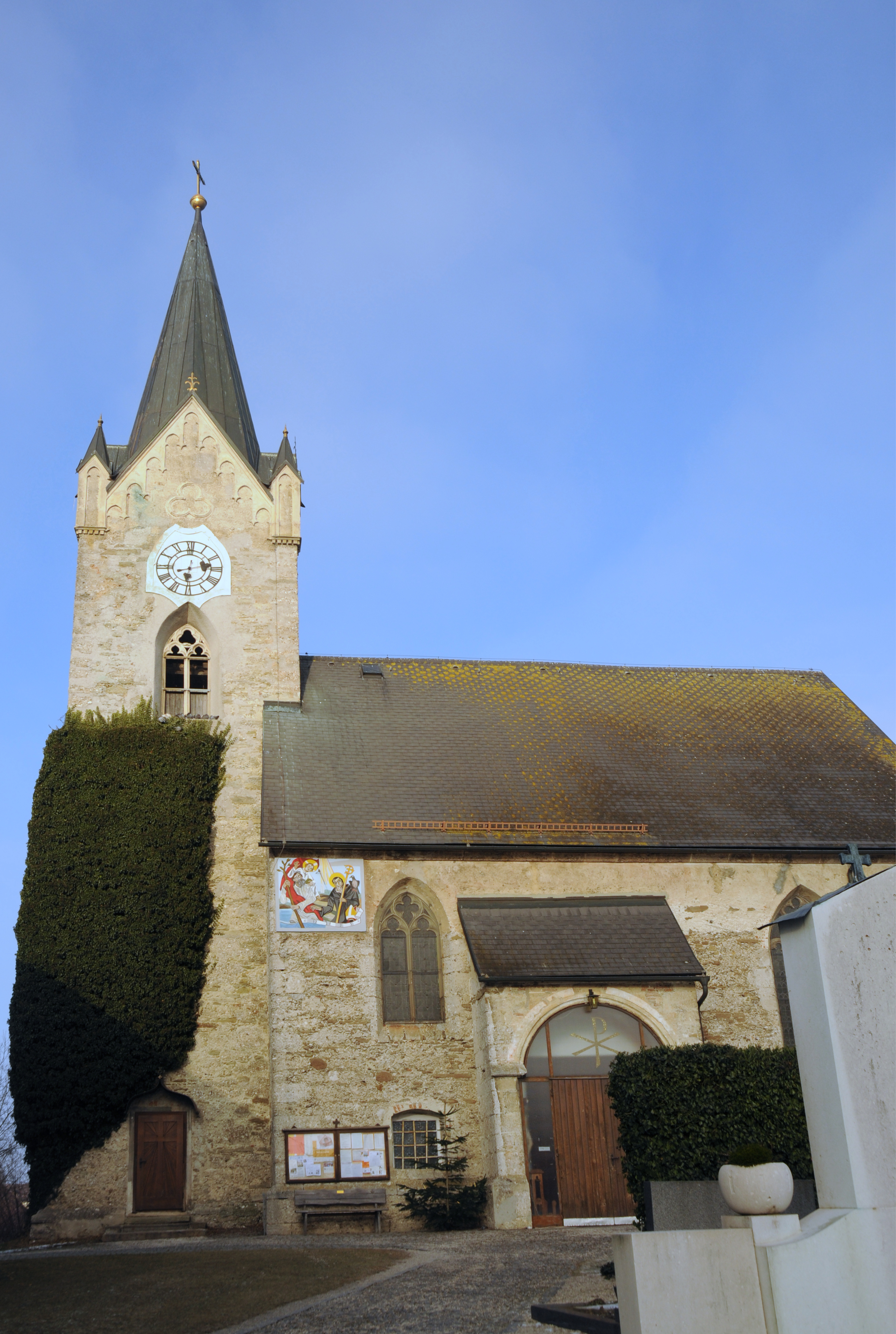

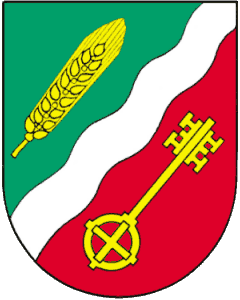
- Coat of arms

- Location within Austria
- Coordinates: 48°07′49″N 13°47′45″E
- Country: Austria
- State: Upper Austria
- District: Wels-Land

Government
  - Mayor: Karl Kaser (ÖVP)

Area
  - Total: 7.22 km^{2} (2.79 sq mi)
- Elevation: 435 m (1,427 ft)

Population (2018-01-01)
  - Total: 704
  - Density: 97.5/km^{2} (253/sq mi)
- Time zone: UTC+1 (CET)
  - Summer (DST): UTC+2 (CEST)
- Postal code: 4672
- Area code: 0 77 35
- Vehicle registration: WL
- Website: www.bachmanning.at

Bachmanning is a municipality in the district of Wels-Land in the Austrian state of Upper Austria.

== Population ==
Historical population
Year	Pop.	±%
1991	571	—
2001	638	+11.7%
