= Eberstalzell =

- Municipality
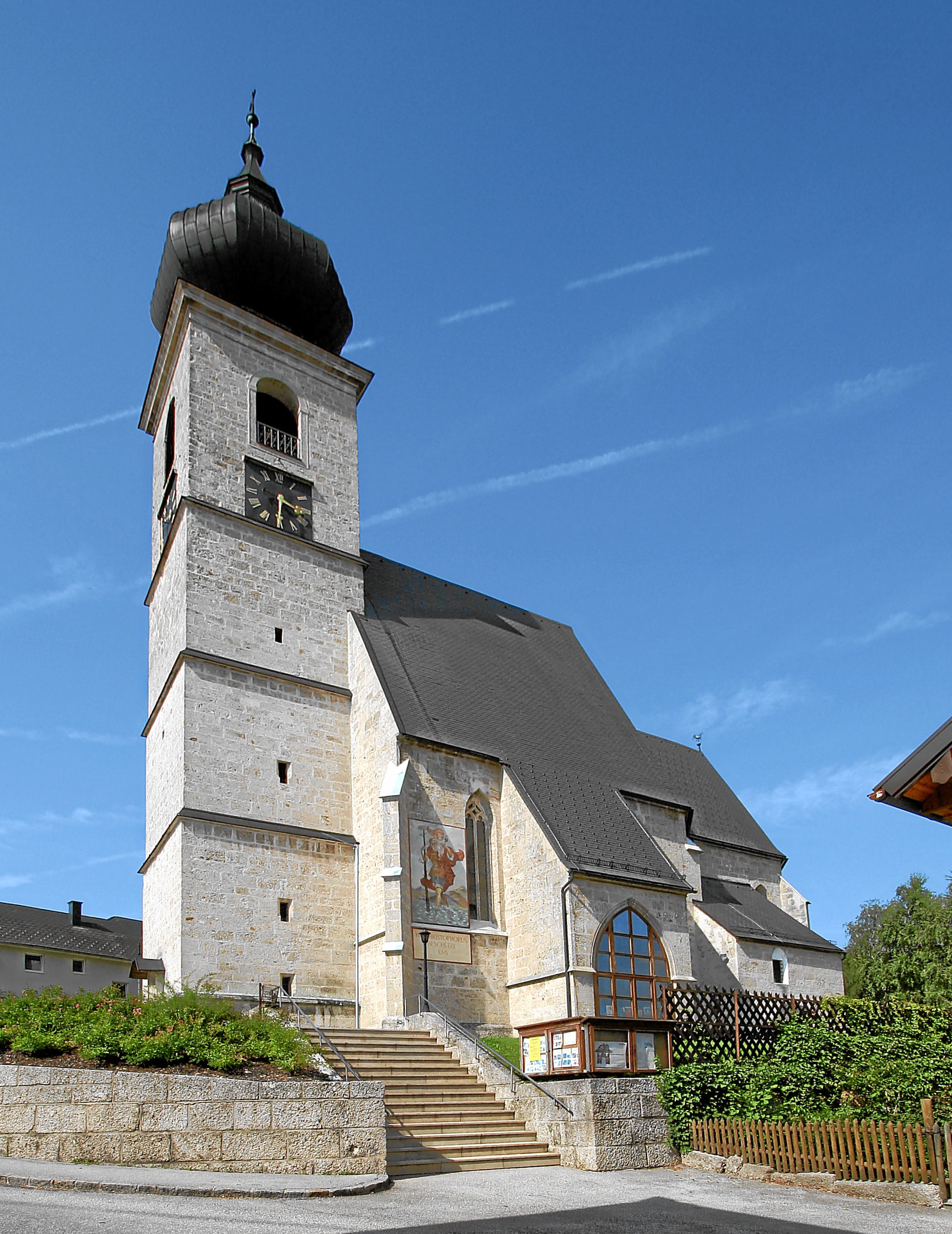

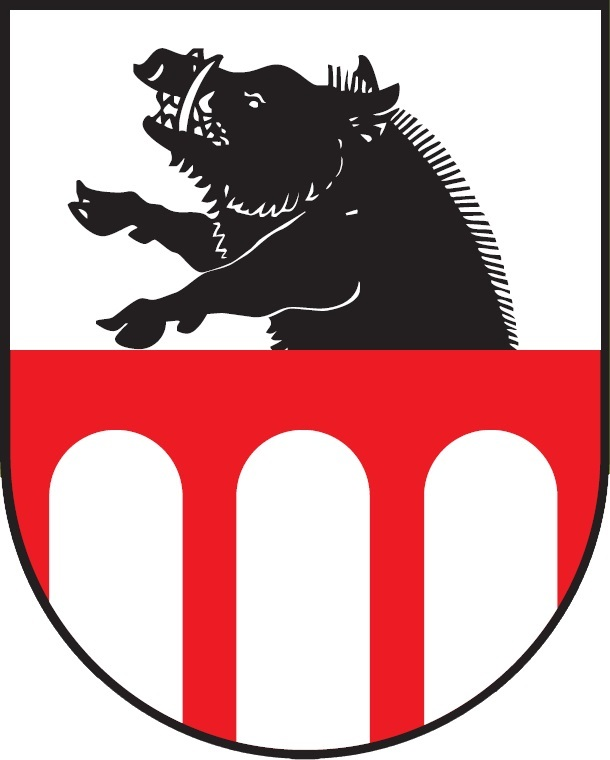
- Coat of arms

- Location within Austria
- Coordinates: 48°02′41″N 13°58′55″E
- Country: Austria
- State: Upper Austria
- District: Wels-Land

Government
  - Mayor: Franz Gimplinger (ÖVP)

Area
  - Total: 27.57 km^{2} (10.64 sq mi)
- Elevation: 400 m (1,300 ft)

Population (2018-01-01)
  - Total: 2,627
  - Density: 95.28/km^{2} (246.8/sq mi)
- Time zone: UTC+1 (CET)
  - Summer (DST): UTC+2 (CEST)
- Postal code: 4653
- Area code: 0 72 41
- Vehicle registration: WL
- Website: www.eberstalzell.at

Eberstalzell is a municipality in the district of Wels-Land in the Austrian state of Upper Austria.

== Geography ==
Eberstalzell lies in the Hausruckviertel. About 8 percent of the municipality is forest, and 83 percent is farmland.
