= Aichkirchen, Austria =

Aichkirchen
- Municipality
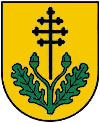
- Coat of arms

- Location within Austria
- Coordinates: 48°06′36″N 13°47′45″E
- Country: Austria
- State: Upper Austria
- District: Wels-Land

Government
  - Mayor: Franz Haider (ÖVP)

Area
  - Total: 6.5 km^{2} (2.5 sq mi)
- Elevation: 448 m (1,470 ft)

Population (2018-01-01)
  - Total: 582
  - Density: 90/km^{2} (230/sq mi)
- Time zone: UTC+1 (CET)
  - Summer (DST): UTC+2 (CEST)
- Postal code: 4671
- Area code: 07735
- Vehicle registration: WL
- Website: www.aichkirchen.at

Aichkirchen is a municipality in the district of Wels-Land in the Austrian state of Upper Austria.

== Population ==
Historical population
Year	Pop.	±%
1991	480	—
2001	497	+3.5%
2008	519	+4.4%

== See also ==
- Aichkirchen, Germany
