= Steinerkirchen an der Traun =

- Municipality
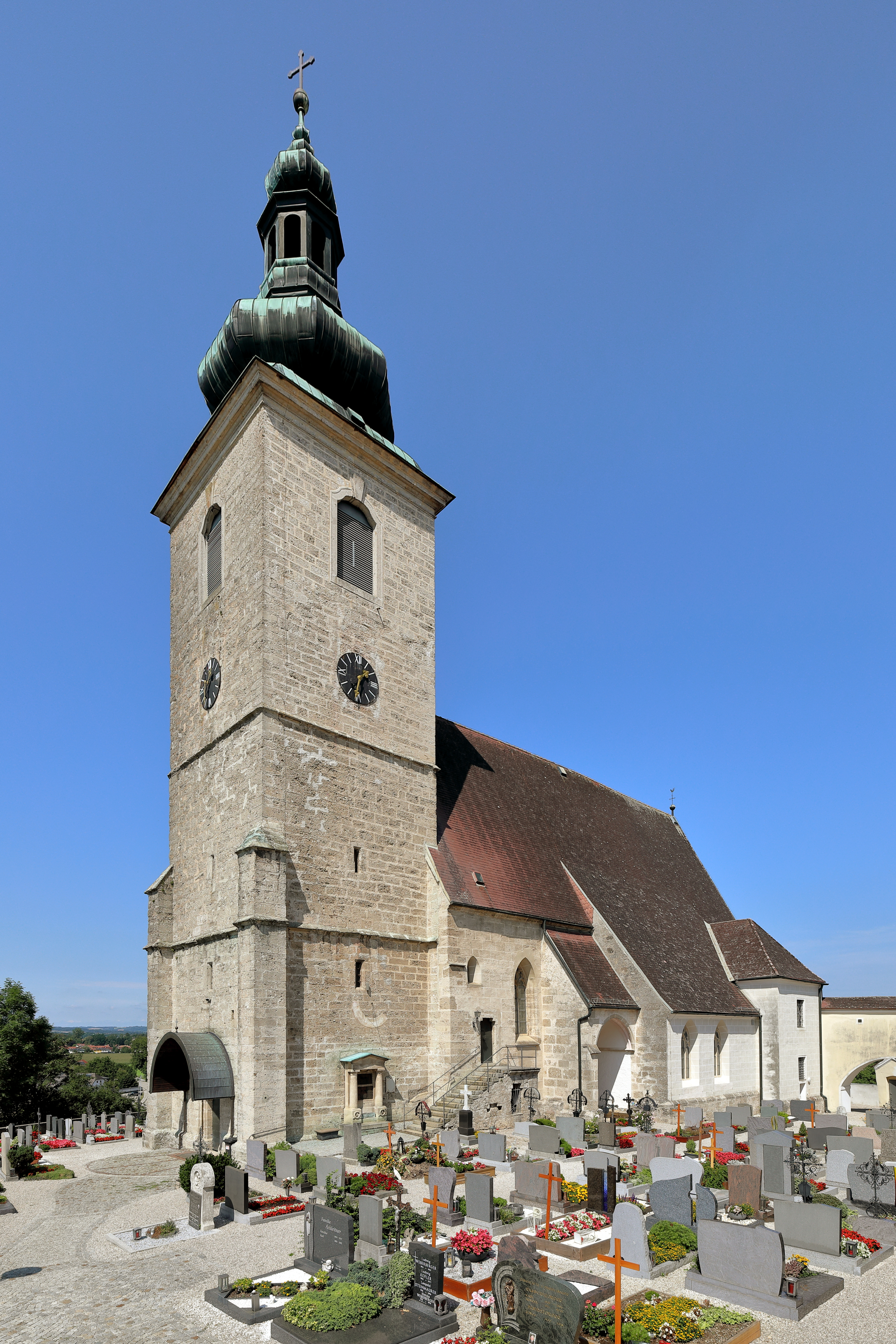

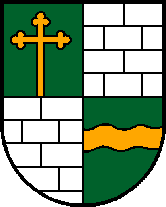
- Coat of arms

- Location within Austria
- Coordinates: 48°04′43″N 13°57′30″E
- Country: Austria
- State: Upper Austria
- District: Wels-Land

Government
  - Mayor: Thomas Steinerberger (ÖVP)

Area
  - Total: 32.55 km^{2} (12.57 sq mi)
- Elevation: 381 m (1,250 ft)

Population (2018-01-01)
  - Total: 2,371
  - Density: 72.84/km^{2} (188.7/sq mi)
- Time zone: UTC+1 (CET)
  - Summer (DST): UTC+2 (CEST)
- Postal code: 4652
- Area code: 07241
- Vehicle registration: WL
- Website: www.steinerkirchen.at

Steinerkirchen an der Traun is a municipality in the district of Wels-Land in the Austrian state of Upper Austria.

== Population ==
Historical population
Year	Pop.	±%
1991	2,068	—
2001	2,149	+3.9%
2007	2,355	+9.6%
