= Norman Cahners =

American publisher (1914–1986)

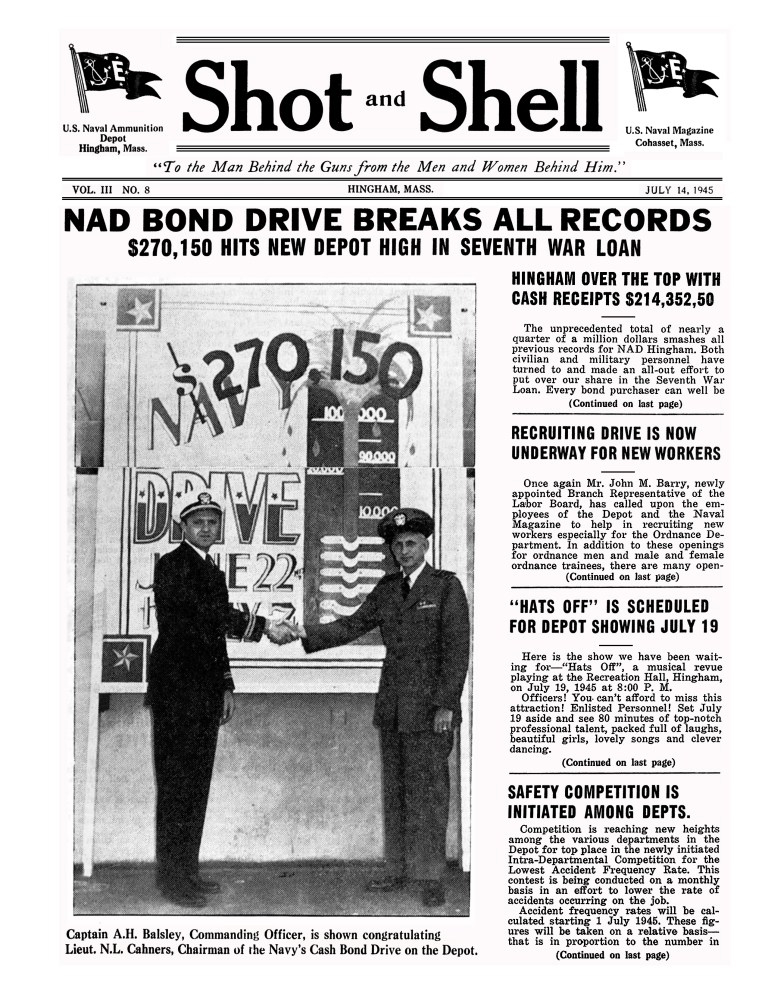

Norman Lee Cahners (1914–1986) was a major American publisher and philanthropist. The Cahners Publishing Company, which he founded in 1960, had grown into the largest U.S. publisher of trade or business magazines at the time of Cahner's death, three weeks before he was scheduled to retire. Cahners Publishing survived into the early 2000s as Cahners Business Information, a division of the British and Dutch-based Reed Elsevier publishing empire. The company was renamed Reed Business Information (U.S) in 2002, and its headquarters moved from Boston to New York.

== Early life ==
Cahners was born in Bangor, Maine, the son of James A. Cahners, described in one source as a "businessman, publisher, lawyer, artist, and management consultant". The father owned the Bangor Gas Company and Eastern Furniture Company, and lived on Broadway. The younger Cahners attended Phillips Academy and then Harvard, where he became a leading track & field athlete. He and team captain Milton Green qualified for the trials to join the U.S. Olympic Team in 1936 but boycotted that event because the games were to be held in Nazi Germany. As if in compensation, Cahners was one of two Harvard undergrads selected to speak at the Harvard Tercentenery Ceremonies in 1936, before an audience of 10,000 alumni, and over a worldwide radio hook-up. Cahners was also elected president of the Harvard Class of 1936 and was later inducted into the Harvard Varsity Athletic Hall of Fame.

== From materials handling to publishing empire ==
While directing the U.S. Naval Ordnance Materials Handling Laboratory at the Hingham Naval Ammunition Depot, Hingham, Massachusetts during World War II, Cahners started a newsletter called The Palletizer, taking its name from the pallet, then a relatively new technology used to move goods on and off ships and around bases. Cahners was an important technical contributor to the nascent field of materials handling, inventing and patenting a 'four-way pallet' which became the military and later industry standard. The magazine gave contractors advice on how to ship goods for the Navy using the new pallet and forklift system.

The Navy let Cahners and his adjunct Saul Goldweitz (who became his lifelong business partner) take both the laboratory and the magazine private after the war and it became Modern Materials Handling. Cahners began acquiring other magazines in 1956, starting with Metalworking, and launching still others. Abandoning his first career in materials handling, he became one of the pioneers of 'niche-publishing', founding journals to appeal to specific business audiences and loading them with information and advertising. Cahners Publishing had grown to 90 magazine titles by the time of Cahners' death, the best-known being Variety and Publishers Weekly. The company was headquartered in the Boston suburb of Newton. The first Cahners magazine, Modern Materials Handling, is still published today by Peerless Media, a B2B media company located in Framingham, MA.

== Philanthropy ==
Cahners and his wife Helene became major philanthropists in Boston. There is a Cabot-Cahners room in Boston's Symphony Hall, a Cahners Theater in the Boston Museum of Science, and a Cahners Hall at Northeastern University. The Cahners-Rabb Professorship is an endowed chair at the Harvard Business School, and there is an endowed chair in Cahner's name for a cellist's position in the Boston Symphony Orchestra. Cahners was a Trustee of Colby College in Waterville, Maine. Helene Rabb Cahners chaired the Board of Trustees at Westbrook College, and was a Trustee of Mt. Holyoke College, the American Association for the Advancement of Science (AAAS), and numerous Boston-area hospitals.

== Memorials ==
Reed Business Information dispenses the Norman L. Cahners Life-Time Achievement Award in recognition of the "outstanding, creative use of the business press in the marketing of products and services". This is one of the prestigious CEBA (Creative Excellence in Business Advertising) Awards. Recipients have included the CEO's of Sony Corporation of America, Time-Warner, General Electric, and NBC.

A second Norman L. Cahners Award is presented by the Materials Handling Industry of America through their Material Handling Education Foundation. Cahners himself won the organization's Reed Apple Award.

In 1970 Cahners was named "Man of the Year" by The Advertising Club of New York.
