= Hemau =

- Town
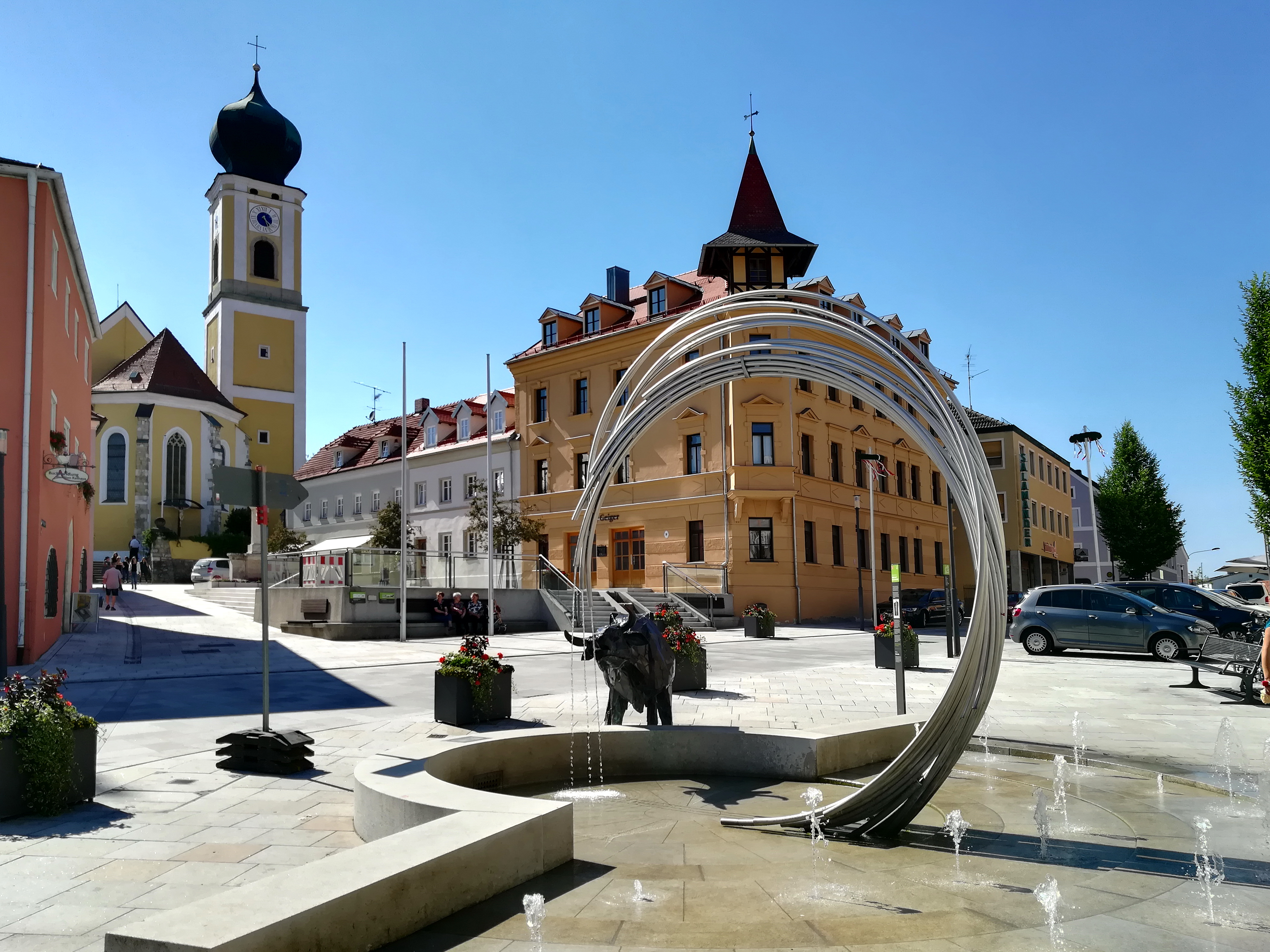
- Town square with the Church of Saint John the Baptist

- Coat of arms

- Location of Hemau within Regensburg district
- Interactive map of Hemau
- Location within Germany Location within Bavaria
- Coordinates: 49°03′07″N 11°46′58″E
- Country: Germany
- State: Bavaria
- Admin. region: Oberpfalz
- District: Regensburg
- Subdivisions: 13 Ortsteile

Government
  - Mayor (2020–26): Herbert Tischhöfer (CSU)

Area
  - Total: 122.33 km^{2} (47.23 sq mi)
- Elevation: 514 m (1,686 ft)

Population (2025-12-31)
  - Total: 9,348
  - Density: 76.42/km^{2} (197.9/sq mi)
- Time zone: UTC+01:00 (CET)
  - Summer (DST): UTC+02:00 (CEST)
- Postal codes: 93155
- Dialling codes: 09491
- Vehicle registration: R
- Website: www.hemau.de

Hemau (German pronunciation: [ˈheːmaʊ]) is a small town in Southern Germany, in the district of Regensburg. The town is situated on the Tangrintel, a ridge which runs between the rivers Altmühl and Schwarze Laber.

It lies on the B8 road, 28 km (17 mi) north-west of Regensburg, 77 km (48 mi) south-east of Nuremberg. The nearest towns, about 5 km (3 mi) distant, are Beratzhausen and Laaber.

The area around Hemau was settled in pre-Roman times. Of archeological interest are the remains of two Celtic settlements (Keltenschanzen) in the nearby villages of Laufenthal and Thonlohe. The name Hemau is attested as Hembaur in the 9th century, Hembur in the 13th. In the 2005, Hemau celebrated the 700th anniversary of its founding.

Today Hemau is best approached from the A3 motorway (exit Beratzhausen when approaching from the north, or Nittendorf when coming from the south). The nearest railway station is Beratzhausen. There are three schools, a primary school, a Hauptschule and a Realschule; the nearest Gymnasium is at Parsberg.

Hemau boasts the largest solar energy production plant in the world, which was opened on 29 April 2003.

== Gemeinde Hemau ==
The Gemeinde (administrative jurisdiction) of Hemau is the largest in the Landkreis, and includes ten outlying villages which are technically Ortsteile ("parts of town"), though they are not in the town of Hemau itself:

- Aichkirchen
- Berletzhof
- Haag
- Hohenschambach
- Klingen
- Kollersried
- Langenkreith
- Laufenthal
- Pellndorf
- Thonlohe
