= Pichl bei Wels =

- Municipality
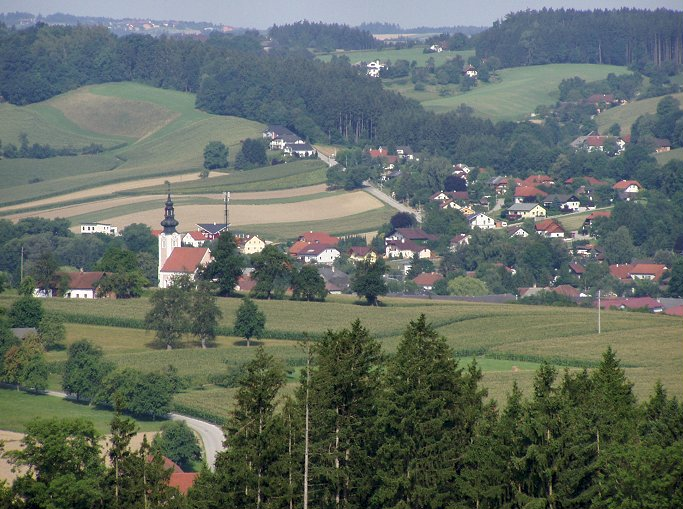

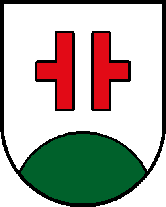
- Coat of arms

- Location within Austria
- Coordinates: 48°11′07″N 13°54′00″E
- Country: Austria
- State: Upper Austria
- District: Wels-Land

Government
  - Mayor: Johann Doppelbauer (ÖVP)

Area
  - Total: 26.35 km^{2} (10.17 sq mi)
- Elevation: 332 m (1,089 ft)

Population (2018-01-01)
  - Total: 2,863
  - Density: 108.7/km^{2} (281.4/sq mi)
- Time zone: UTC+1 (CET)
  - Summer (DST): UTC+2 (CEST)
- Postal code: 4632
- Area code: 07247
- Vehicle registration: WL

Pichl bei Wels is a municipality in the district of Wels-Land in the Austrian state of Upper Austria.

== Population ==
Historical population
Year	Pop.	±%
1991	2,503	—
2001	2,719	+8.6%

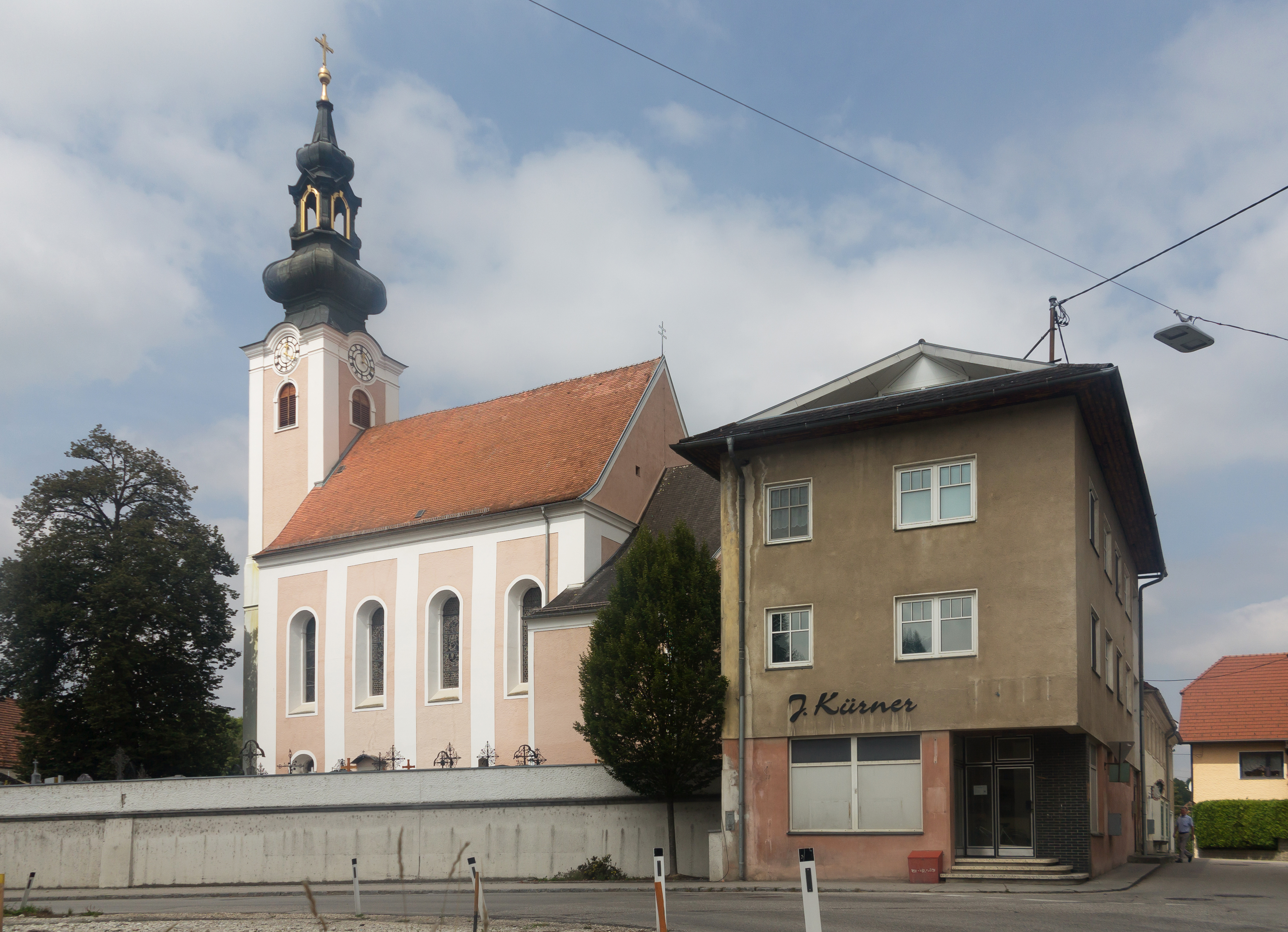
Pichl bei Wels, church: Katholische Pfarrkirche heilige Martin
