= Weißkirchen an der Traun =

- Municipality
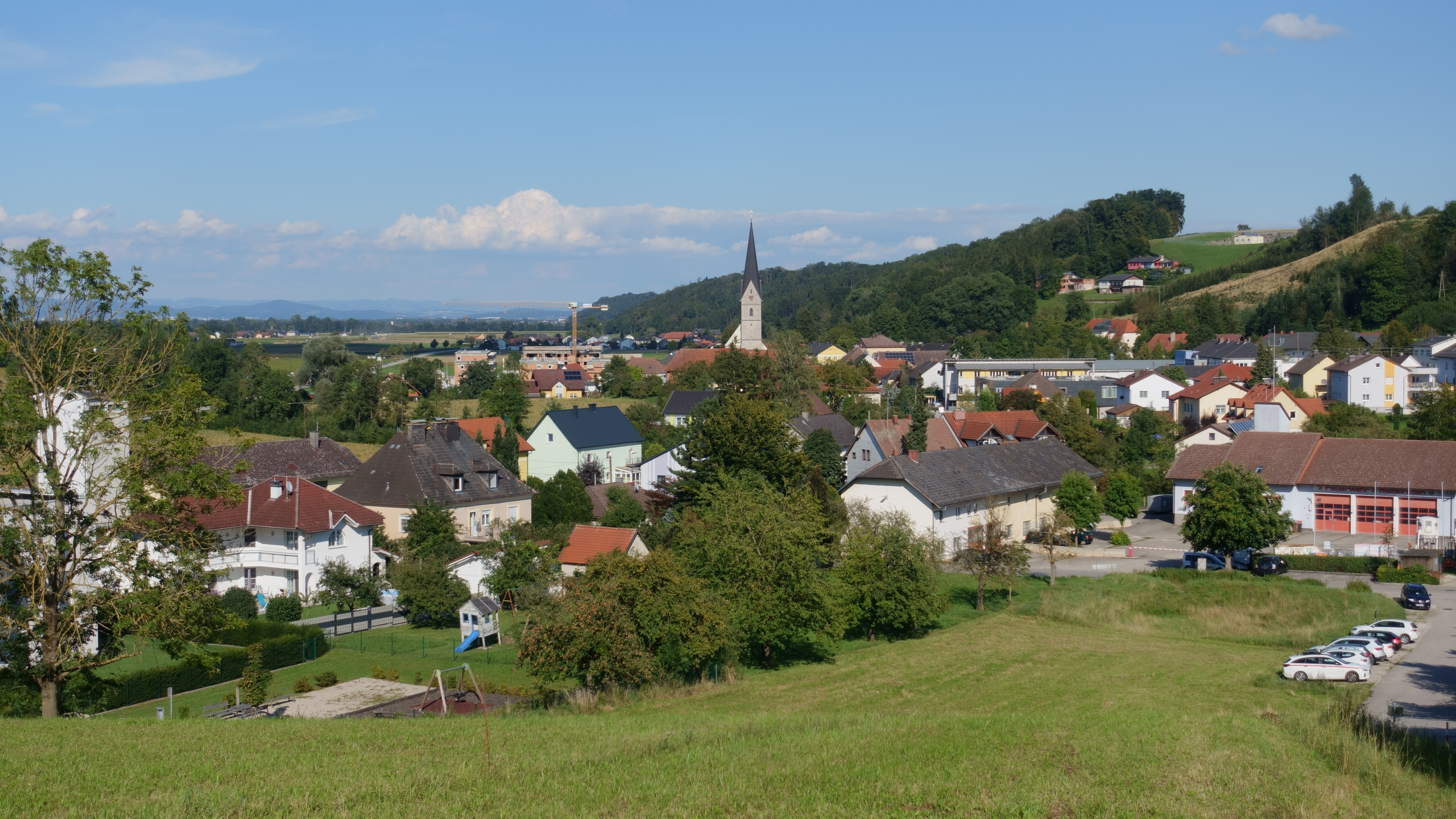

- Coat of arms

- Location within Austria
- Coordinates: 48°09′53″N 14°07′42″E
- Country: Austria
- State: Upper Austria
- District: Wels-Land

Government
  - Mayor: Patrick Krutzler (SPÖ)

Area
  - Total: 21.71 km^{2} (8.38 sq mi)
- Elevation: 305 m (1,001 ft)

Population (2018-01-01)
  - Total: 3,430
  - Density: 158/km^{2} (409/sq mi)
- Time zone: UTC+1 (CET)
  - Summer (DST): UTC+2 (CEST)
- Postal code: 4616
- Area code: 07243
- Vehicle registration: WL
- Website: www.weisskirchen.at

Weißkirchen an der Traun is a municipality in the district of Wels-Land in the Austrian state of Upper Austria.

== Population ==
Historical population
| Year | Pop. | ±% |
|---|---|---|
| 1869 | 1,240 | — |
| 1880 | 1,222 | −1.5% |
| 1890 | 1,123 | −8.1% |
| 1900 | 1,103 | −1.8% |
| 1910 | 1,178 | +6.8% |
| 1923 | 1,270 | +7.8% |
| 1934 | 1,240 | −2.4% |
| 1939 | 1,406 | +13.4% |
| 1951 | 1,403 | −0.2% |
| 1961 | 1,324 | −5.6% |
| 1971 | 1,488 | +12.4% |
| 1981 | 1,778 | +19.5% |
| 1991 | 2,089 | +17.5% |
| 2001 | 2,652 | +27.0% |
| 2011 | 3,123 | +17.8% |
