= Edt bei Lambach =

- Municipality
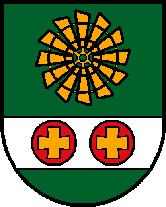
- Coat of arms

- Location within Austria
- Coordinates: 48°05′24″N 13°54′17″E
- Country: Austria
- State: Upper Austria
- District: Wels-Land

Government
  - Mayor: Alexander Bäck (ÖVP)

Area
  - Total: 21.18 km^{2} (8.18 sq mi)
- Elevation: 330 m (1,080 ft)

Population (2018-01-01)
  - Total: 2,197
  - Density: 103.7/km^{2} (268.7/sq mi)
- Time zone: UTC+1 (CET)
  - Summer (DST): UTC+2 (CEST)
- Postal code: 4650
- Area code: 0 72 45
- Vehicle registration: WL

Edt bei Lambach is a municipality in the district of Wels-Land in the Austrian state of Upper Austria.

== Population ==
Historical population
Year	Pop.	±%
1991	1,798	—
2001	2,082	+15.8%
