= Pennewang =

- Municipality
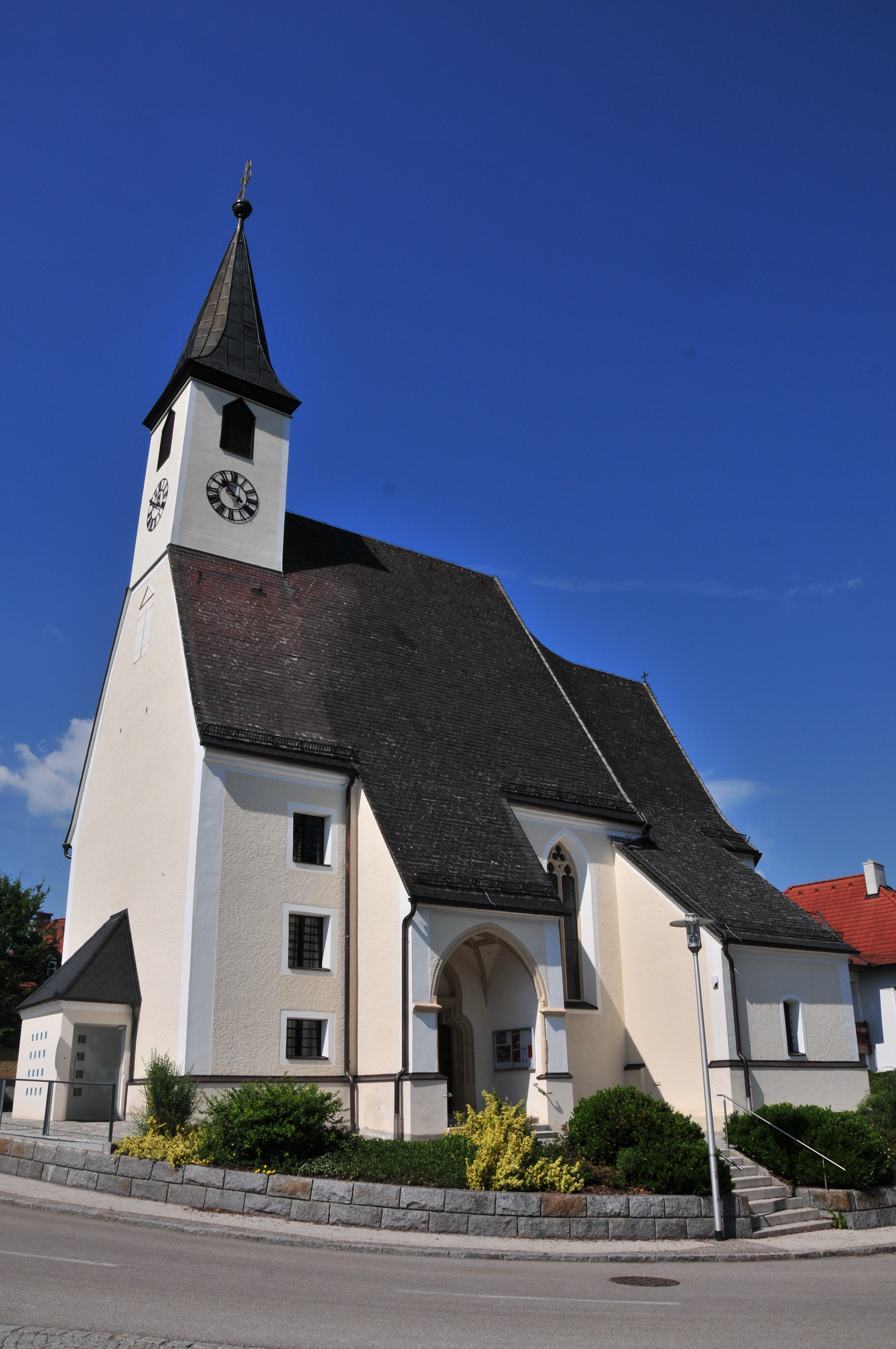

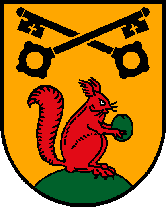
- Coat of arms

- Location within Austria
- Coordinates: 48°07′46″N 13°50′38″E
- Country: Austria
- State: Upper Austria
- District: Wels-Land

Government
  - Mayor: Franz Waldenberger (ÖVP)

Area
  - Total: 18.37 km^{2} (7.09 sq mi)
- Elevation: 396 m (1,299 ft)

Population (2018-01-01)
  - Total: 888
  - Density: 48.3/km^{2} (125/sq mi)
- Time zone: UTC+1 (CET)
  - Summer (DST): UTC+2 (CEST)
- Postal code: 4624
- Area code: 0 72 45
- Vehicle registration: WL

Pennewang is a municipality in the district of Wels-Land in the Austrian state of Upper Austria.

== Population ==
Historical population
| Year | Pop. | ±% |
|---|---|---|
| 1991 | 813 | — |
| 2001 | 859 | +5.7% |
