= Bad Wimsbach-Neydharting =

- Municipality
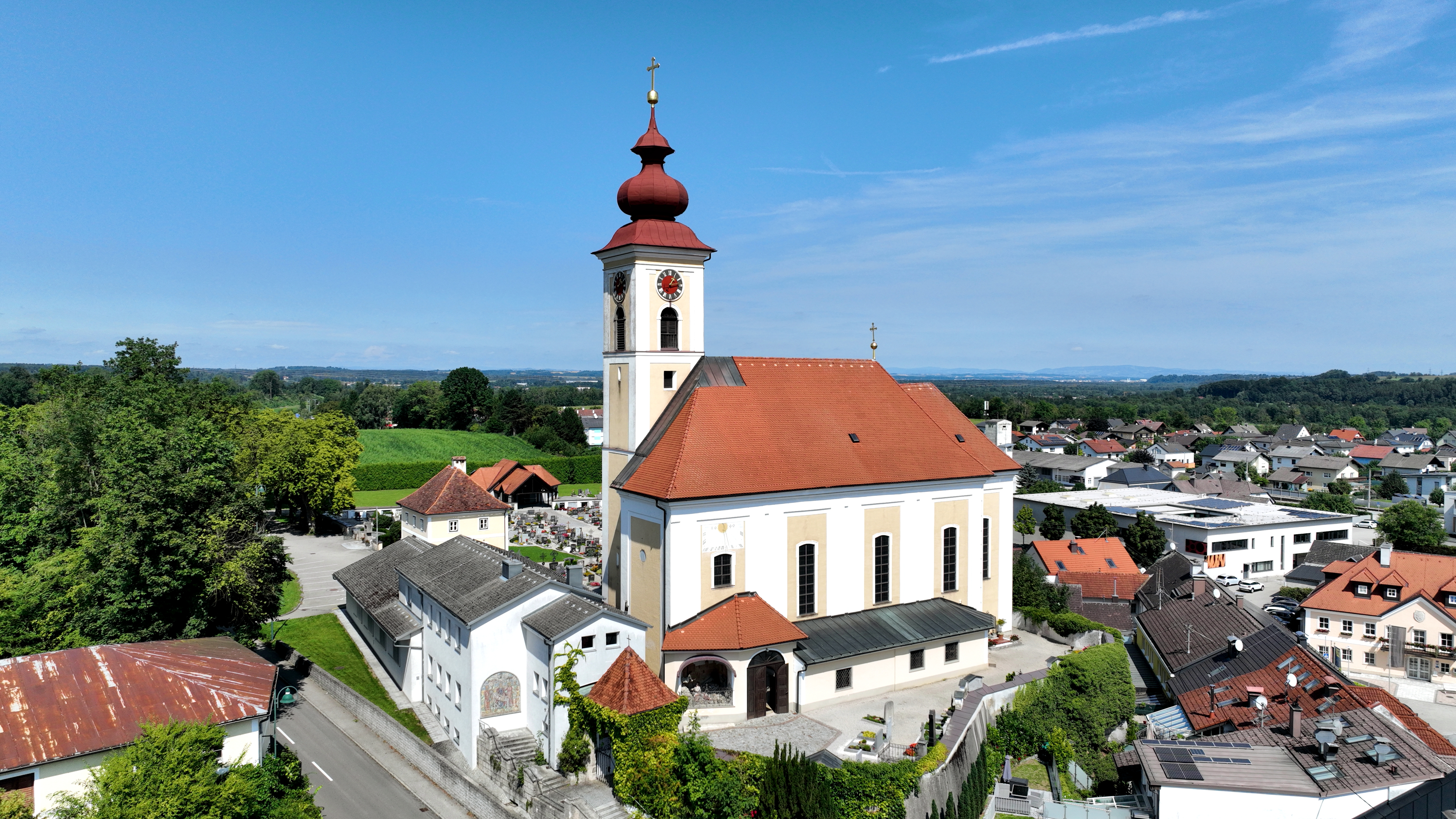
- Church of Saint Stephen

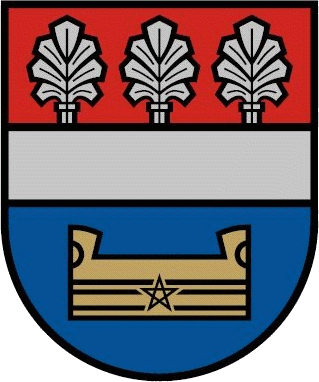
- Coat of arms

- Location within Austria
- Coordinates: 48°03′50″N 13°54′07″E
- Country: Austria
- State: Upper Austria
- District: Wels-Land

Government
  - Mayor: Erwin Stürzlinger (ÖVP)

Area
  - Total: 24.31 km^{2} (9.39 sq mi)
- Elevation: 387 m (1,270 ft)

Population (2018-01-01)
  - Total: 2,533
  - Density: 104.2/km^{2} (269.9/sq mi)
- Time zone: UTC+1 (CET)
  - Summer (DST): UTC+2 (CEST)
- Postal code: 4654
- Area code: 0 72 45
- Vehicle registration: WL
- Website: www.bad-wimsbach.at

Bad Wimsbach-Neydharting is a municipality in the district of Wels-Land in the Austrian state of Upper Austria.

== Population ==
Historical population
Year	Pop.	±%
1991	2,300	—
2001	2,360	+2.6%

== International relations ==
=== Twin towns – Sister cities ===
Bad Wimsbach-Neydharting is twinned with:

- Friedrichsdorf, Germany
