= Laufenthal =

Coordinates: 49°04′N 11°49′E

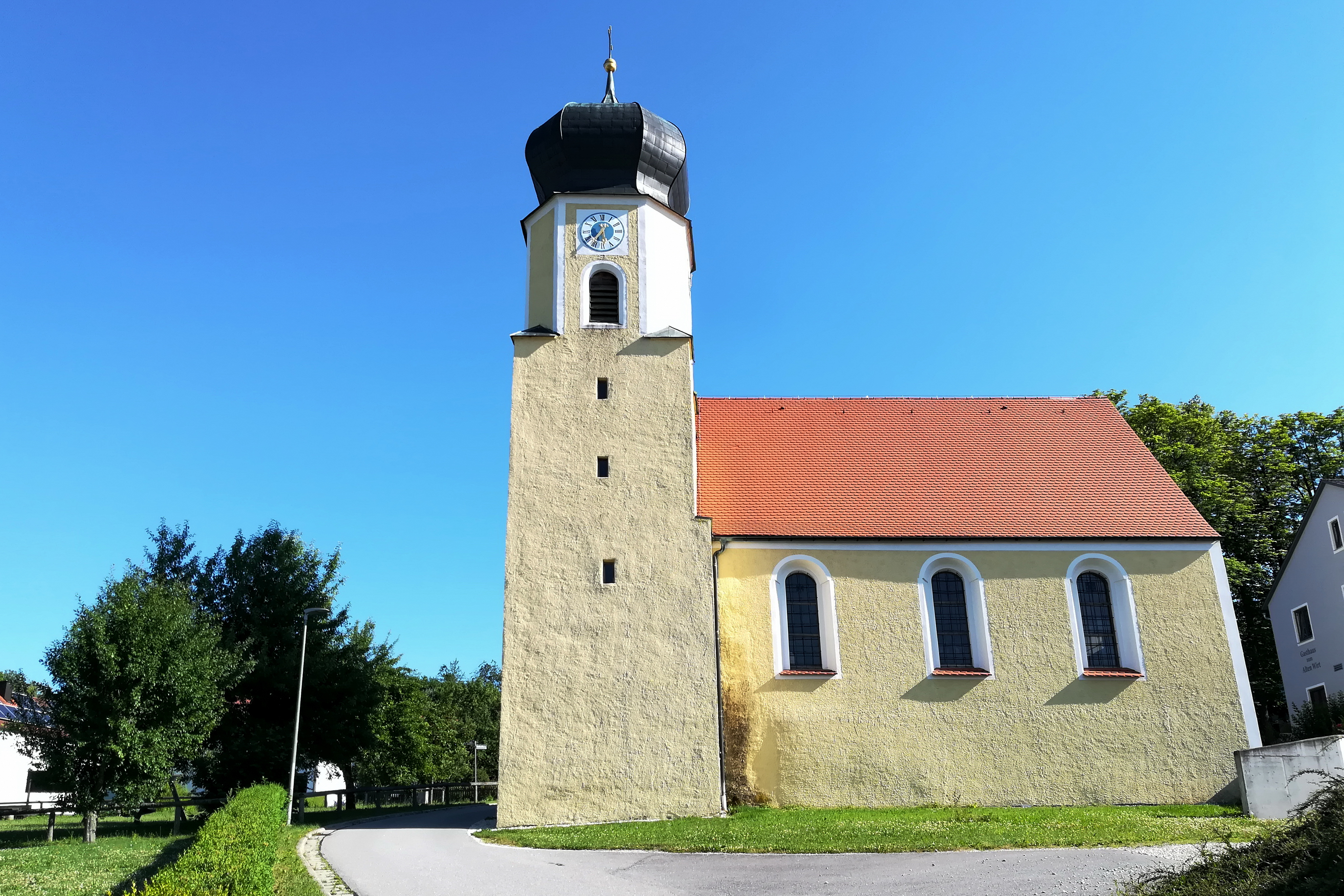
Church of St Ottilia, Laufenthal

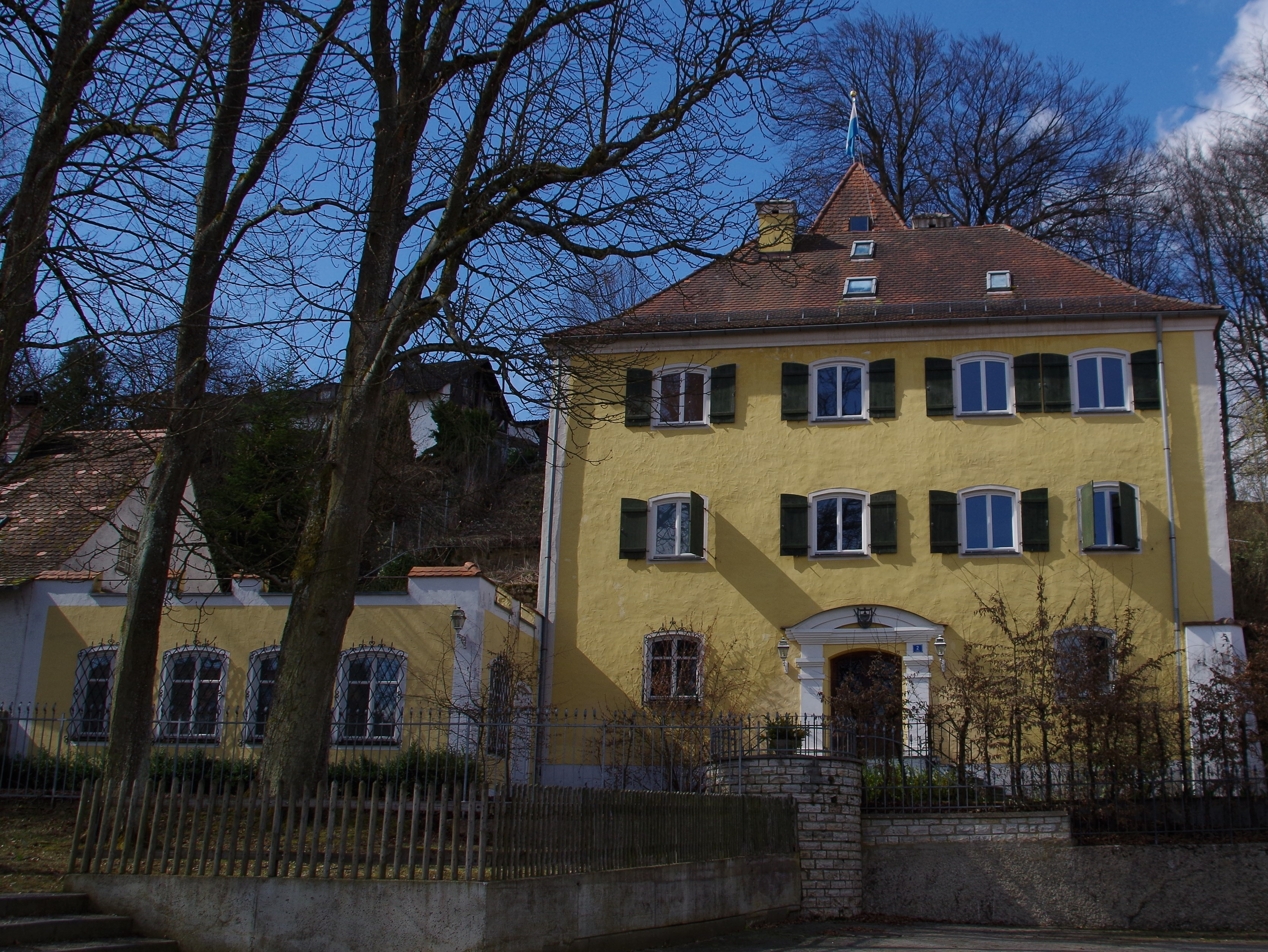
Laufenthal Castle

Laufenthal is a village in the Upper Palatinate (Bavaria, Germany), belonging to the administrative district (Landkreis) of Regensburg and the market town of Hemau. Technically a ward (Ortsteil) of Hemau, Laufenthal lies about five kilometers from the town, near the river Laaber. It has a medieval castle, and the remains of a Celtic settlement (Keltenschanze see: Nemeton). The village church, dedicated to St Ottilia, belongs to the parish of Hohenschambach.
