= Holzhausen, Austria =

Holzhausen
- Municipality
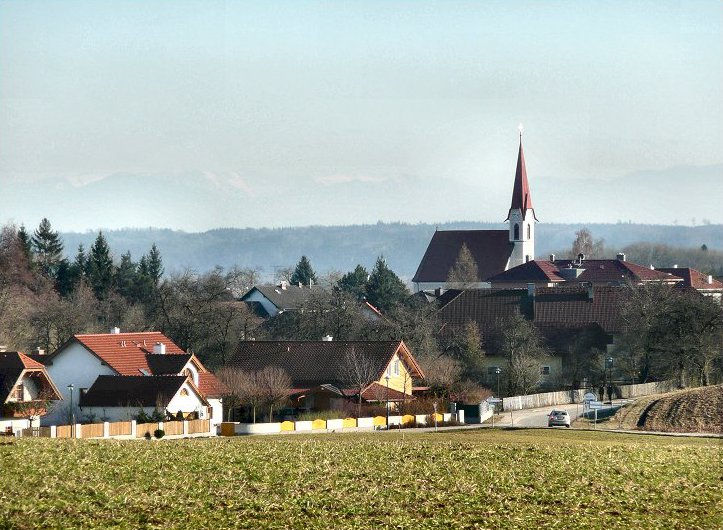

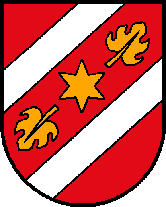
- Coat of arms

- Location within Austria
- Coordinates: 48°13′23″N 14°05′56″E
- Country: Austria
- State: Upper Austria
- District: Wels-Land

Government
  - Mayor: Klaus Hügelsberger (ÖVP)

Area
  - Total: 7.77 km^{2} (3.00 sq mi)
- Elevation: 329 m (1,079 ft)

Population (2018-01-01)
  - Total: 995
  - Density: 128/km^{2} (332/sq mi)
- Time zone: UTC+1 (CET)
  - Summer (DST): UTC+2 (CEST)
- Postal code: 4615
- Area code: 0 72 43
- Vehicle registration: WL
- Website: www.gemeinde-holzhausen.at

Holzhausen is a municipality in the district of Wels-Land in the Austrian state of Upper Austria.

== Population ==
Historical population
Year	Pop.	±%
1991	597	—
2001	642	+7.5%
