= Sipbachzell =

- Municipality
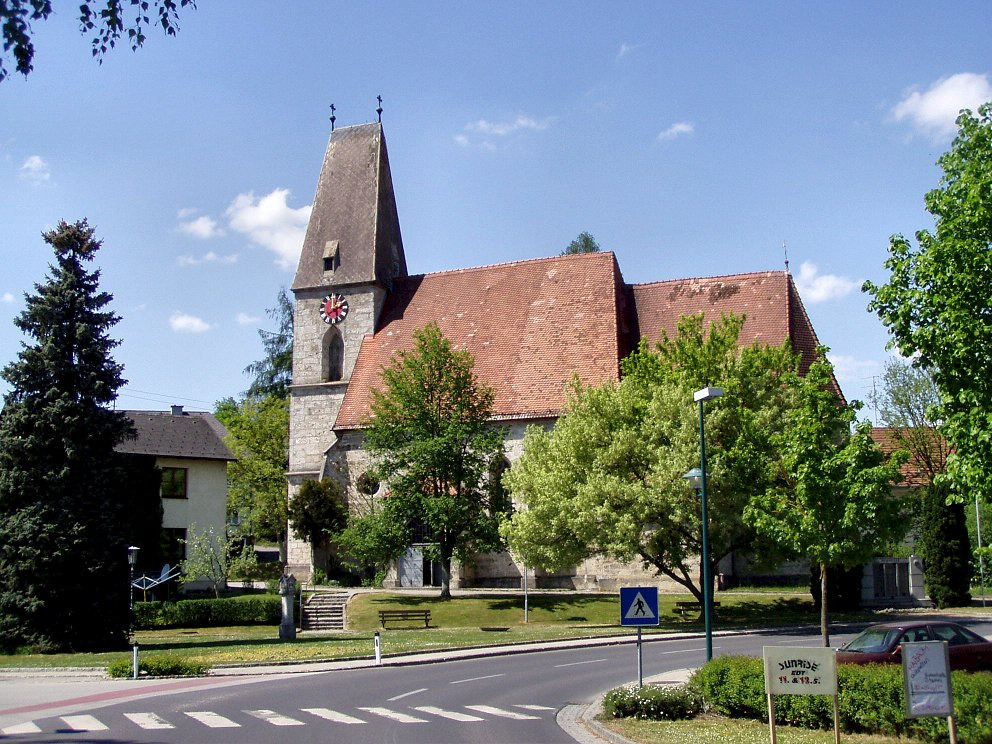

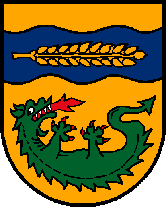
- Coat of arms

- Location within Austria
- Coordinates: 48°05′53″N 14°06′36″E
- Country: Austria
- State: Upper Austria
- District: Wels-Land

Government
  - Mayor: Heinrich Striegl (ÖVP)

Area
  - Total: 24.77 km^{2} (9.56 sq mi)
- Elevation: 366 m (1,201 ft)

Population (2018-01-01)
  - Total: 1,975
  - Density: 79.73/km^{2} (206.5/sq mi)
- Time zone: UTC+1 (CET)
  - Summer (DST): UTC+2 (CEST)
- Postal code: 4621
- Area code: 07240
- Vehicle registration: WL
- Website: www.sipbachzell.at

Sipbachzell is a municipality in the district of Wels-Land in the Austrian state of Upper Austria.

== Population ==
Historical population
Year	Pop.	±%
1991	1,480	—
2001	1,713	+15.7%
2005	1,765	+3.0%
