= Modern Materials Handling =

Business magazine

Modern Materials Handling is a monthly B2B magazine published by Peerless Media. It was founded by Norman Cahners in 1945.

The group publisher and president of Peerless Media is Brian Ceraolo. The chief editor is Michael Levans, with the editorial offices located in Framingham, Massachusetts, USA.

Topics covered include: materials handling automation and mechanization, storage and staging, inventory data management, transport packaging, lift trucks and accessories, and other resources related to the materials handling side of the supply chain.

Reed Business Information closed Modern Materials Handling on April 16, 2010. On April 23, Reed sold its closed Supply Chain publications to a new company, Peerless Media, formed by Brian Ceraolo, former Group Publisher.
