= Haag (Oberpfalz) =

- Ortsteil of Hemau
- Interactive map of Haag
- Location within Germany Location within Bavaria
- Coordinates: 49°3′N 11°47′E
- Country: Germany
- State: Bavaria
- District: Regensburg
- Municipality: Hemau
- Time zone: UTC+01:00 (CET)
  - Summer (DST): UTC+02:00 (CEST)

Haag (German pronunciation: [haːk]) is a village about four kilometers from Hemau in the Upper Palatinate, in Bavaria, Germany. It belongs administratively to the town of Hemau, Regensburg (district).
