= Offenhausen, Austria =

Offenhausen
- Municipality
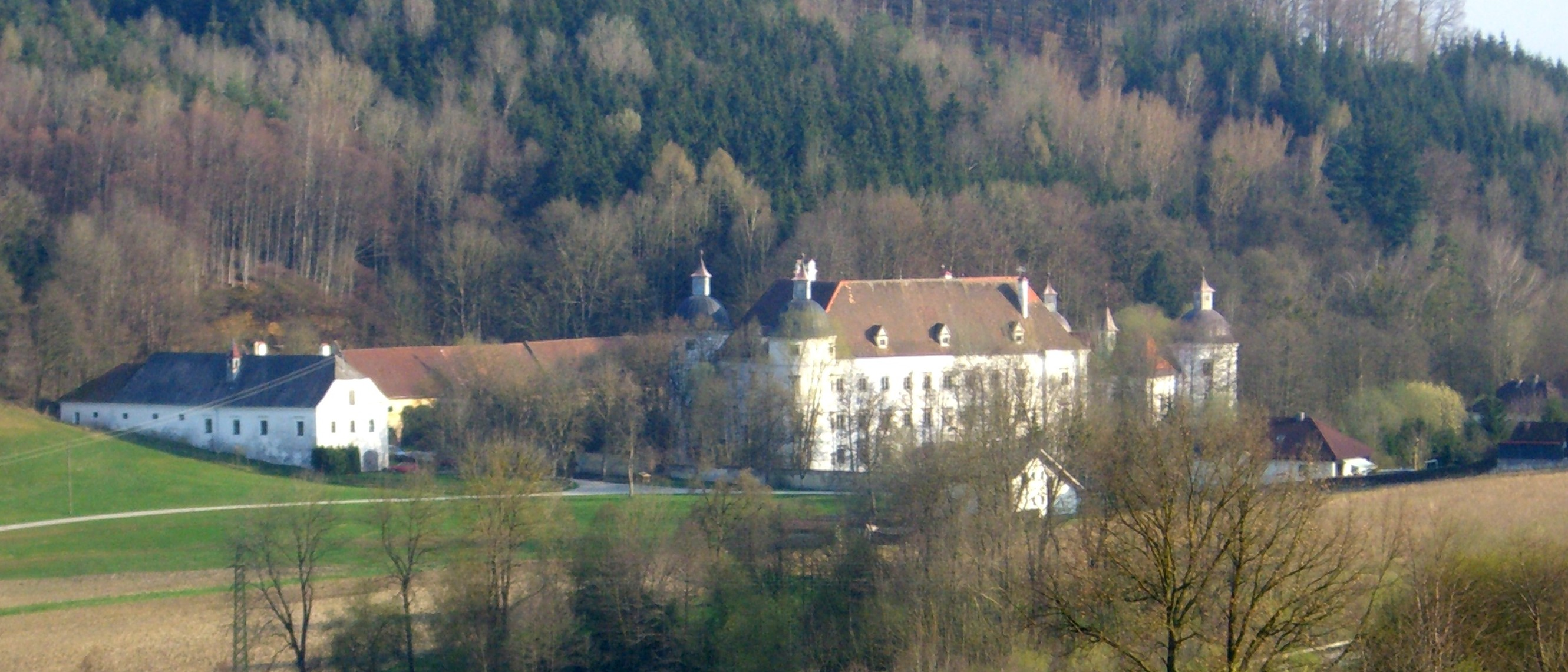

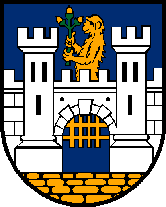
- Coat of arms

- Location within Austria
- Coordinates: 48°09′27″N 13°50′17″E
- Country: Austria
- State: Upper Austria
- District: Wels-Land

Government
  - Mayor: Cathrin Piber (ÖVP)

Area
  - Total: 15.06 km^{2} (5.81 sq mi)
- Elevation: 386 m (1,266 ft)

Population (2018-01-01)
  - Total: 1,638
  - Density: 108.8/km^{2} (281.7/sq mi)
- Time zone: UTC+1 (CET)
  - Summer (DST): UTC+2 (CEST)
- Postal code: 4625
- Area code: 07247
- Vehicle registration: WL
- Website: www.offenhausen.at

Offenhausen is a municipality in the Austrian state of Upper Austria in the district Wels-Land. It gained the official right to hold markets in 1534 from King Ferdinand I.

== Population ==
Historical population
| Year | Pop. | ±% |
|---|---|---|
| 1981 | 1,252 | — |
| 1991 | 1,340 | +7.0% |
| 2001 | 1,546 | +15.4% |
| 2013 | 1,582 | +2.3% |
