= Wels-Land District =

Coordinates: 48.129°N 13.957°E

Wels-Land District Bezirk Wels-Land
- District
- Country: Austria
- State: Upper Austria
- Number of municipalities: 24
- Administrative seat: Wels

Government
  - District Governor: Elisabeth Schwetz

Area
  - Total: 457.7 km^{2} (176.7 sq mi)

Population (2001)
  - Total: 63,004
  - Density: 137.7/km^{2} (356.5/sq mi)
- Time zone: UTC+01:00 (CET)
  - Summer (DST): UTC+02:00 (CEST)
- Vehicle registration: WL

Bezirk Wels-Land is a district of the state of Upper Austria in Austria.

== Municipalities ==
Towns (Städte) are indicated in boldface; market towns (Marktgemeinden) in italics; suburbs, hamlets and other subdivisions of a municipality are indicated in small characters.

- Aichkirchen
- Bachmanning
- Bad Wimsbach-Neydharting
- Buchkirchen
- Eberstalzell
- Edt bei Lambach
- Fischlham
- Gunskirchen
- Holzhausen
- Krenglbach
- Lambach
- Marchtrenk
- Neukirchen bei Lambach
- Offenhausen
- Pennewang
- Pichl bei Wels
- Sattledt
- Schleißheim
- Sipbachzell
- Stadl-Paura
- Steinerkirchen an der Traun
- Steinhaus
- Thalheim bei Wels
- Weißkirchen an der Traun
