= Jules Haag =

French mathematician and horologist

Jules Haag (9 August 1882, Flirey – 16 February 1953, Besançon) was a French mathematician and horologist.

== Education and career ==
Haag matriculated at l'École Normale Supérieure in 1903 and successfully qualified for the agrégation of mathematics in 1906. He received in 1910 his doctorate in mathematics from the University of Paris with dissertation Families de Lamé, composées de surfaces égales: généralisations, applications under the supervision of Gaston Darboux.

Haag was professor of mathématiques spéciales at the lycée of Douai from 1906 to 1908. At the science faculty of Clermont-Ferrand, he became in 1910 maître de conférences in astronomy and in 1910 professor of rational mechanics.

During WWI, Haag worked in French marine artillery center in Gâvres.

In 1927 he became head of the Chronometry Institute in Besançon, which became the École Nationale Supérieure de Chronométrie et Micromécanique in 1961, renamed École nationale supérieure de mécanique et des microtechniques (E.N.S.M.M.) in 1980. At the beginning of the 1930s, he wrote numerous publications in the fields of synchronized oscillations, sustained oscillations, and relaxation oscillations.

Haag was an Invited Speaker of the ICM in 1924 at Toronto and in 1932 at Zurich.
