= Steinhaus, Austria =

Steinhaus
- Municipality
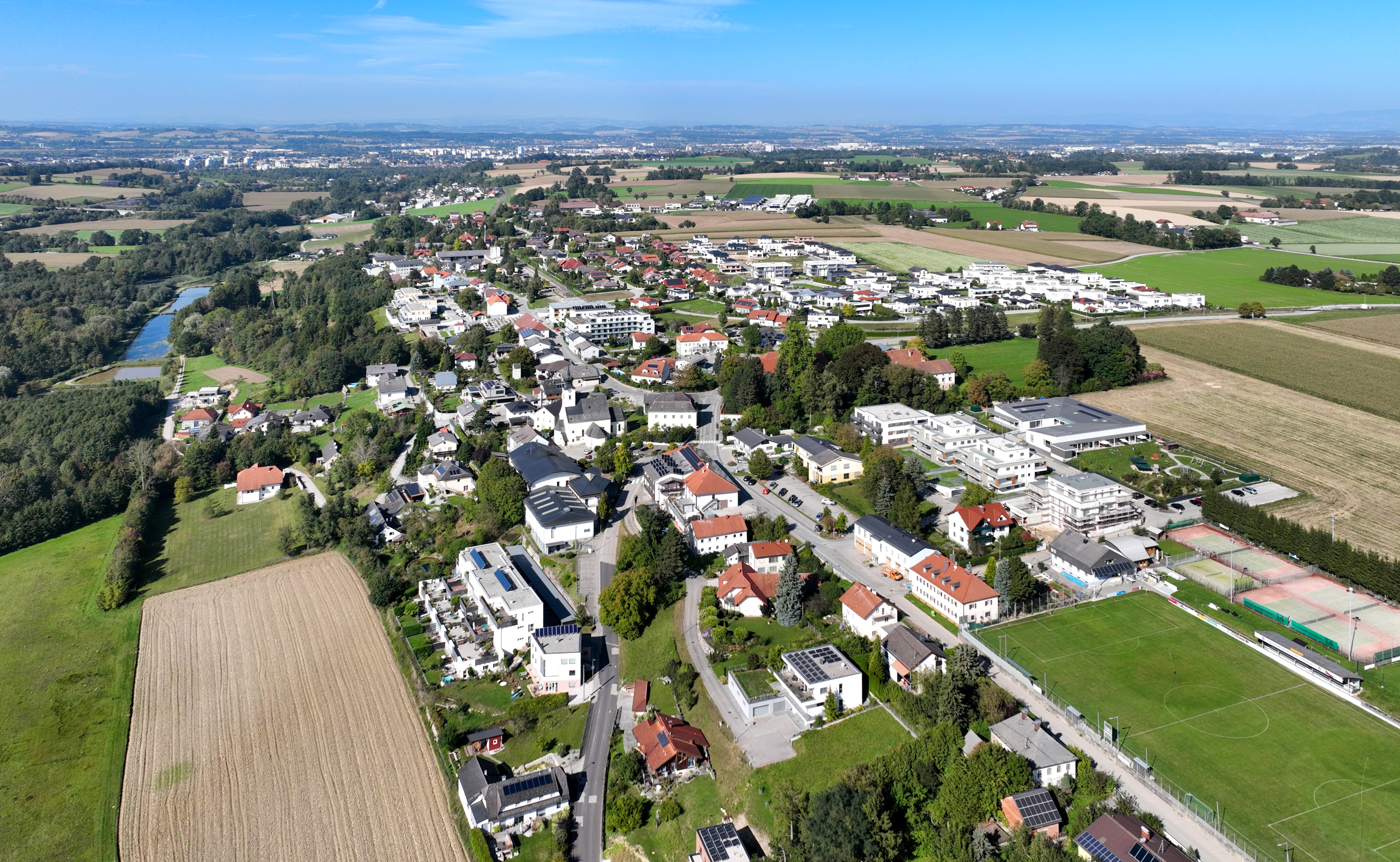
- South view of Steinhaus in Upper Austria

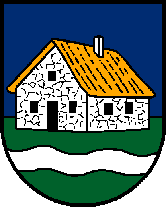
- Coat of arms

- Location within Austria
- Coordinates: 48°06′58″N 14°01′14″E
- Country: Austria
- State: Upper Austria
- District: Wels-Land

Government
  - Mayor: Harald Piritsch (FPÖ)

Area
  - Total: 25.14 km^{2} (9.71 sq mi)
- Elevation: 378 m (1,240 ft)

Population (2018-01-01)
  - Total: 2,187
  - Density: 86.99/km^{2} (225.3/sq mi)
- Time zone: UTC+1 (CET)
  - Summer (DST): UTC+2 (CEST)
- Postal code: 4641
- Area code: 0 72 42
- Vehicle registration: WL
- Website: www.steinhaus.ooe.gv.at

Steinhaus is a municipality in the district of Wels-Land in the Austrian state of Upper Austria.

== Population ==
Historical population
Year	Pop.	±%
1991	1,734	—
2001	1,801	+3.9%
