= Marchtrenk =

- Municipality
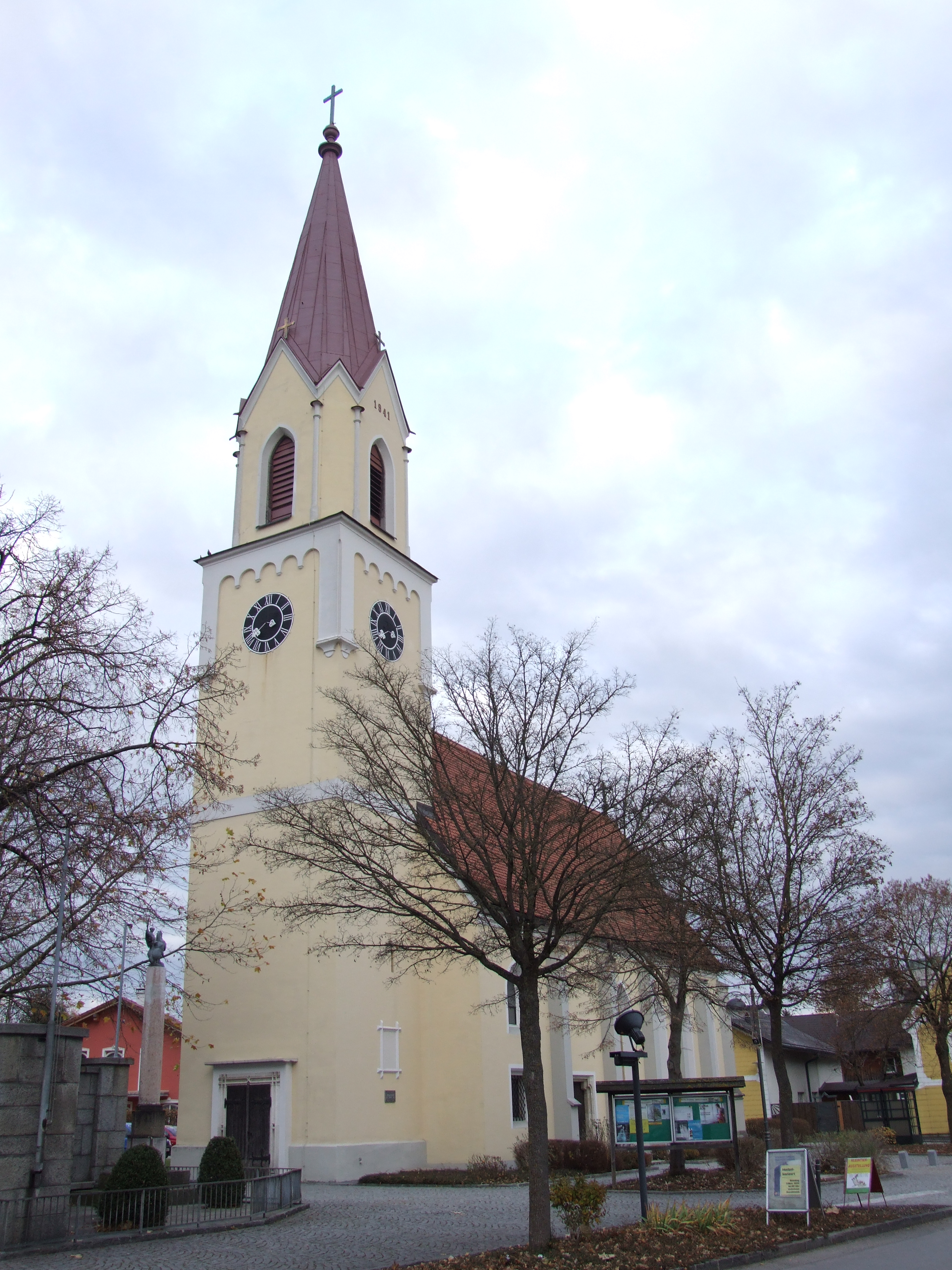

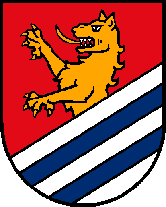
- Coat of arms

- Location within Austria
- Coordinates: 48°11′30″N 14°06′38″E
- Country: Austria
- State: Upper Austria
- District: Wels-Land

Government
  - Mayor: Paul Mahr (SPÖ)

Area
  - Total: 23.09 km^{2} (8.92 sq mi)
- Elevation: 304 m (997 ft)

Population (2018-01-01)
  - Total: 13,603
  - Density: 589.1/km^{2} (1,526/sq mi)
- Time zone: UTC+1 (CET)
  - Summer (DST): UTC+2 (CEST)
- Postal code: 4614
- Area code: 07243
- Vehicle registration: WL
- Website: www.marchtrenk.com

Marchtrenk is a municipality with about 12.500 inhabitants in the district Wels-Land in the province Upper Austria of the Republic of Austria. It is situated on the river Traun.

== Population ==
Historical population
Year	Pop.	±%
1869	1,727	—
1880	1,942	+12.4%
1890	2,025	+4.3%
1900	2,219	+9.6%
1910	2,467	+11.2%
1923	2,416	−2.1%
1934	3,035	+25.6%
1939	3,207	+5.7%
1951	4,366	+36.1%
1961	6,869	+57.3%
1971	8,873	+29.2%
1981	9,416	+6.1%
1991	10,369	+10.1%
2001	11,274	+8.7%
2011	12,276	+8.9%

== Mayors ==
- 1969–1990 Ferdinand Reisinger (SPÖ)
- bis 2013 Fritz Kaspar (SPÖ)
- since 2013 Paul Mahr (SPÖ)
