= Aichkirchen, Germany =

Village in the Upper Palatinate, Bavaria

Coordinates: 49°0′32″N 11°45′20″E

- Village
- Interactive map of Aichkirchen, Germany
- Country: Germany

Aichkirchen is a village in the Upper Palatinate, Bavaria, Germany. It is part of the municipality Hemau.
