= Vorchdorf =

- Municipality
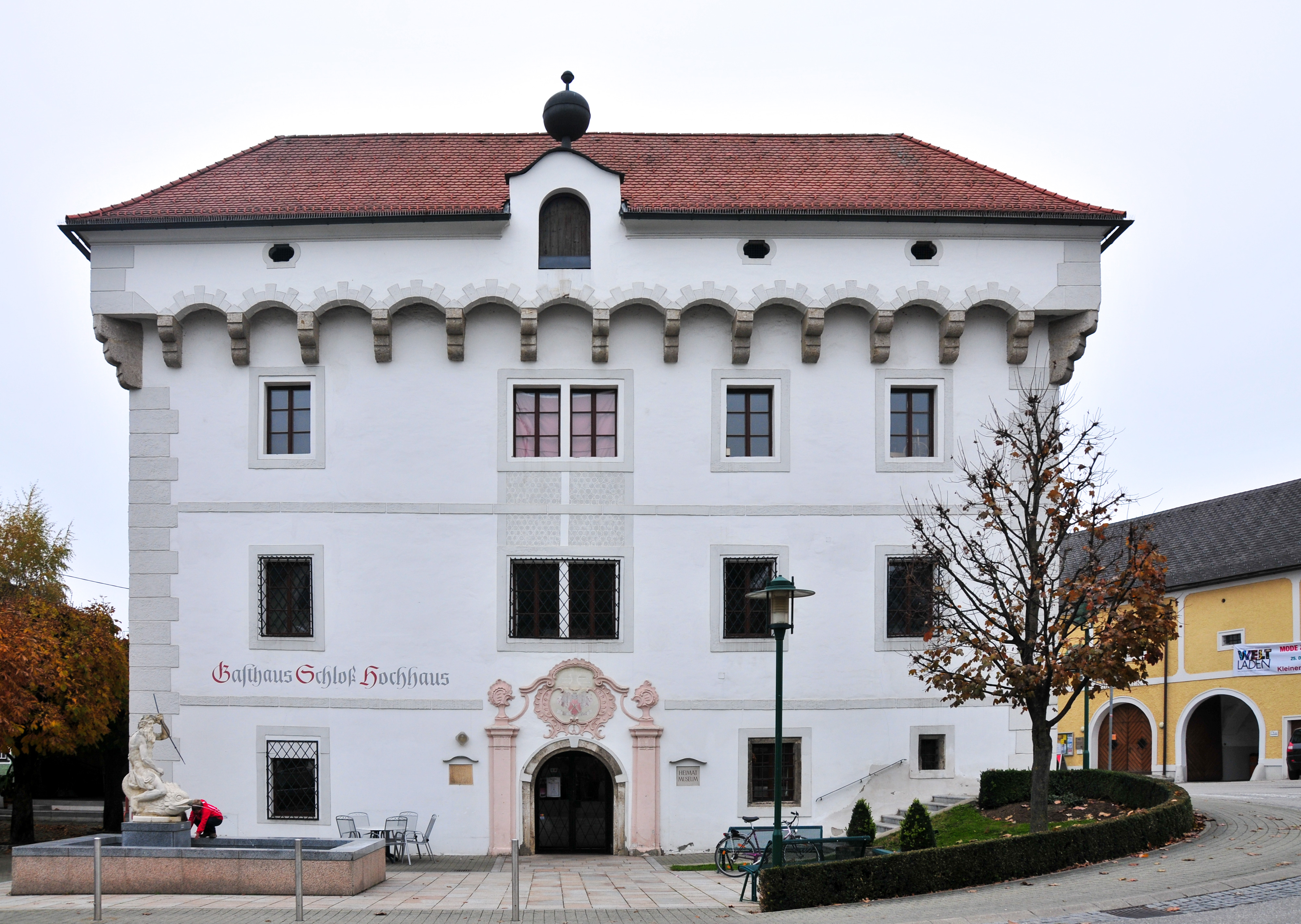
- Hochhaus Castle

- Coat of arms

- Location within Austria
- Coordinates: 48°00′15″N 13°55′27″E
- Country: Austria
- State: Upper Austria
- District: Gmunden

Government
  - Mayor: Johann Mitterlehner (ÖVP)

Area
  - Total: 47.78 km^{2} (18.45 sq mi)
- Elevation: 414 m (1,358 ft)

Population (2018-01-01)
  - Total: 7,475
  - Density: 156.4/km^{2} (405.2/sq mi)
- Time zone: UTC+1 (CET)
  - Summer (DST): UTC+2 (CEST)
- Postal code: 4655
- Area code: 07614
- Vehicle registration: GM
- Website: www.vorchdorf.at

Vorchdorf is a market town in the district of Gmunden in Upper Austria, Austria, as well as the name of the municipal area ("Gemeinde") that the town and others occupy. As of the 2005 census, the town of Vorchdorf had a population of 7,287 inhabitants.

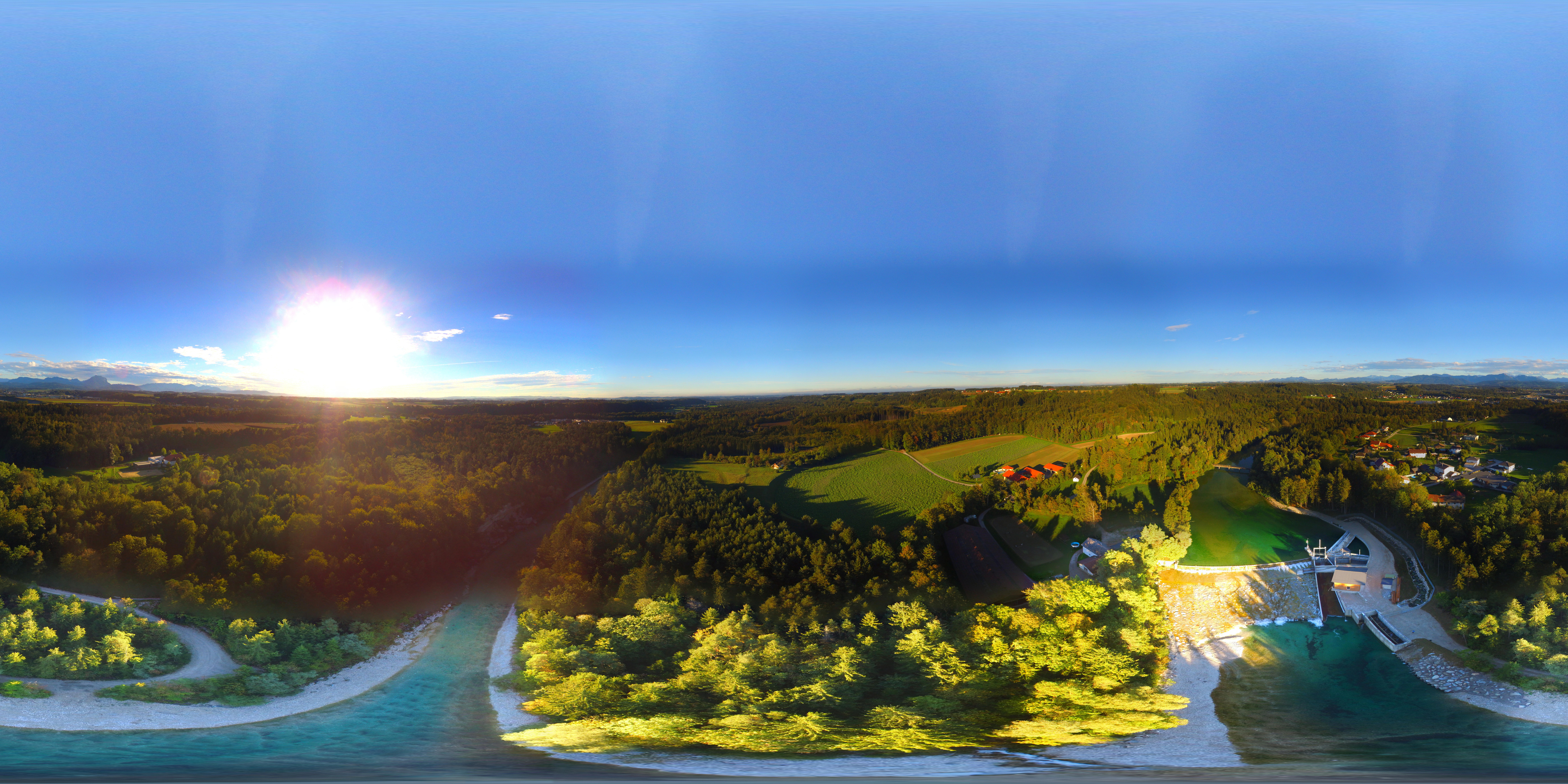
360° airborne panorama, shot at hydropower plant Haresau (view as a 360° interactive panorama)

== Geography ==
Located in the Traunviertel region of the state of Upper Austria, about 15 km north of the town of Gmunden, the town of Vorchdorf has an approximate elevation of 414 m above sea level (highest point: 640 m; deepest point: 370 m). Its area extends 9.3 km from north to south, and 9.8 km from east to west.

The community territory is about 48 km^{2}. 17.2% of the region is wooded and 71.8% of it is used for agriculture. The rivers Laudach and the Alm cross Vorchdorf from the south. The inner Laudach disembogues near the center of Vorchdorf into the outer Laudach.

=== Localities of Vorchdorf ===
Hamlets of Vorchdorf municipality include: Adlhaming, Aggsbach, Albenedt, Berg, Bergern, Eggenberg, Eichham, Einsiedling, Falkenohren, Feldham, Fischböckau, Hötzelsdorf, Heitzing, Lederau, Moos, Mühltal, Oberhörbach, Pappelleiten, Peintal, Point, Radhaming, Schart, Seyrkam, Theuerwang, Unterhörbach, Ursprung, Vorchdorf (center), Weidach. The most populated localities are Vorchdorf (center), Fischböckau, Mühltal, Lederau and Feldham.

Population Development (with secondary residence)
Year	Population
1848	3127
1900	3322
1934	3914
1951	4849
1970	5517
1991	6868
2001	7585
2008	7723
2016	7401

Vorchdorf consists of eleven Katastralgemeinden—that is, cadastral subdivision of municipalities—which are not always congruent with the localities:

- Adlhaming (incl. Albenedt)
- Eggenberg (incl. Eichham, Seyrkam)
- Einsiedling (incl. Aggsbach, Heitzing, Pappelleiten, Radhaming)
- Feldham
- Hörbach (incl. Hötzelsdorf)
- Lederau
- Messenbach (named after the castle Messenbach, which no longer exists, includes the hamlets of Berg, Falkenohren, Peintal, Ursprung and Weidach.)
- Moos
- Mühltal (incl. Point und Schart)
- Theuerwang (incl. Fischböckau)
- Vorchdorf

=== Neighbor communities ===
Neighbor communities to Vorchdorf include: Bad Wimsbach-Neydharting, Eberstalzell, Kirchham, Laakirchen, Pettenbach, Roitham, Scharnstein and Steinerkirchen. Vorchdorf borders to the districts of Wels-Land and Kirchdorf.

== Population ==
Historical population
Year	Pop.	±%
1848	3,127	—
1900	3,322	+6.2%
1934	3,914	+17.8%
1951	4,849	+23.9%
1970	5,517	+13.8%
1991	6,868	+24.5%
2001	5,685	−17.2%

About 500 Transylvanian Saxons relocated to Vorchdorf after the second world war. Thereafter, most of the immigration people descends from Turkey, the former Yugoslavia and from Germany.

== History ==
Because of the geographically convenient location Vorchdorf was settled already in the Neolithic time. Originally lying in the eastern part of the Herzogtum Bayern, the town belonged since the 12th century to the Herzogtum Österreich (Austria). Thereafter since 1490 Vorchdorf was assigned to the Fürstentum (Principality) „Österreich ob der Enns“. During the Napoleonic Wars the town was occupied several times. Since 1918 the Gemeinde belonged to Upper Austria. After the Anschluss Austrias to the Deutsches Reich with 13 March 1938, Vorchdorf belonged to the „Gau Oberdonau“. During the Nazi era, ″Ausländerkinder-Pflegestätten″ were located in Vorchdorf, where deaths also occurred due to undersupply and neglect. After 1945 the recovery of Upper Austria took place. The upper Austrian central government decided 1982 to upraise the Gemeinde to a market town.

=== Emblem ===
Blazon: In green a silver, square house with three stories. A pedestal, black round arch gate, two black rectangular windows on the ground floor and each four black rectangular windows in the two upper stories, whereas the middle windows are double windows. They are crowned with an arc Frieze. Above it there is a small black round arc middle window and a red hip roof. Sideways bordered with shifted corner cuboids. Colors of the Gemeinde: red-white-green

== Politics ==
The Gemeinderat (parish councils) consists of 31 Mandate, and they are divided as follows:

- ÖVP (Austrian Peoples Party) 14
- SPÖ (Social Democratic Party of Austria) 10
- Alle für Vorchdorf (All for Vorchdorf) 3
- FPÖ (Freedom Party of Austria) 2
- Die Grünen (The Greens – The Green Alternative) 2

The Unabhängiger Bauernverband (Independent compound of farmers) do not have any Mandat.

Since 15 April 2008 the mayor is Dipl.-Ing. Gunter Schimpl (ÖVP) after the former mayor Franz Kofler retired from his post.

== Economy and Infrastructure ==
During the early 1960s, Austria built its first autobahn, the Westautobahn A1 motorway. An exit on the roadway was located in Vorchdorf, fostering a great uplift in the economy of the region.

=== Traffic ===
The northern area of the city is divided by the Westautobahn and therefore the community is well located for visitation which is a boon to the region's economy. The local trains, Lambach–Vorchdorf-Eggenberg and Gmunden–Vorchdorf, connect the city to Gmunden in the south and Lambach in the north.

=== Resident Companies ===
- Miba AG
- Josef Wick & Söhne
- Heson
- Brauerei Eggenberg
- Lössl
- Acamp

=== Education ===
- Kindergarten
- Volksschule Vorchdorf
- Volksschule Pamet
- Hauptschule HS1
- Hauptschule HS2 (Music Hauptschule)
- Landesmusikschule (branch office of Laakirchen)

== Religion ==
- Catholic parish church (see sightseeing)
- Branch church Einsiedling (catholic)
- Evangelic church
- Mosque of the Islamic denomination (since December 1980)

== Culture ==
=== Societies ===
- Culture Association Dezibel
- Guten Morgen (Good morning) Vorchdorf: Society
- Marktmusik (music of town) Vorchdorf
- Musikverein der Siebenbürger (music club of the Transylvanian Saxons) Vorchdorf

=== Periodic Events ===
- Marktmusik Festkonzert (gala concert from the music of town)
- Culture weekend in the Kitzmantel
- Hüvie Movie

== Sightseeing ==
- Schloss Eggenberg: an old castle from the year 971. It accommodates the brewery Eggenberg, which proves back also until the 10th century.
- Schloss Hochhaus: an almost originally conserved renaissance castle from the time of 1600. It is one of the first renaissance buildings in Austria. The castle is located in the middle of the town. It includes the Heimatmuseum (museum of local history) and gastronomy.
- Parish church: baroque church building, originally Gothic, from 1700 on reconstructed in baroque style, baroque high altar from 1690.
- Branch church Einsiedling: it is possible, that this church reaches back until the 8th century.
- Heimatmuseum (museum of local history) in the castle Schloss Hochhaus.
- Emailmuseum (museum of enamel) in the Fischerturm (tower of fishers) in the Schloss Hochhaus.
- Motorradmuseum (museum of motorbikes) in the locality Peintal.

== Personalities ==
Sons and daughters:

- Martin Dickinger, born 1959, artist (installations from Papier-mâché); works and lives in Vorchdorf.

Persons with reference to the town:

- Wieland Schmied, born 1929 in Frankfurt am Main, art historian and art critic; lives in Vorchdorf.
