= Laudach =

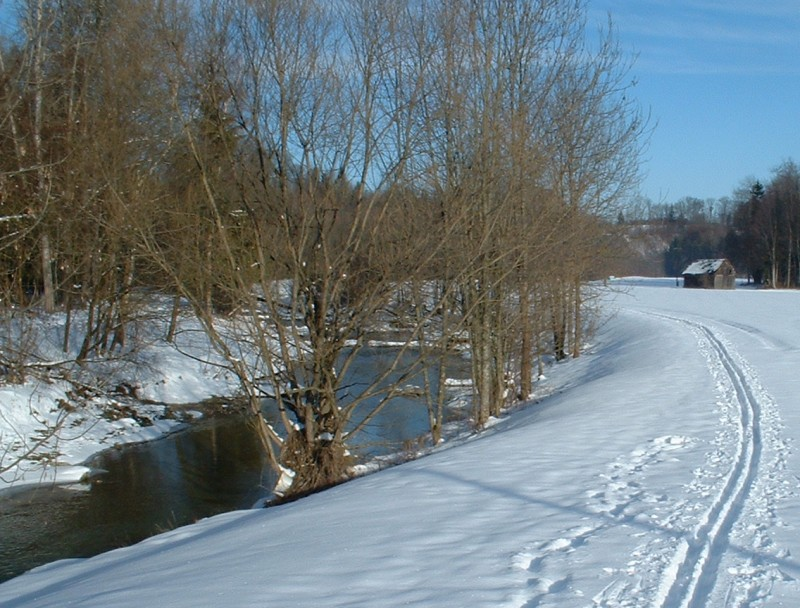
- Laudach in winter

Location
- Country: Austria
- State: Upper Austria

Physical characteristics
- Source
  - location: Laudachsee
- Mouth
  - location: Alm (Bad Wimsbach-Neydharting)
  - coordinates: 48.0392°N 13.9208°E
- Length: 23.2 km (14.4 mi)

Basin features
- Progression: Alm→ Traun→ Danube→ Black Sea

Laudach is a river in the Austrian state of Upper Austria. The river reaches a length of 23 km (14 mi). The Laudach is a left and the main tributary of the Alm.

The longer Äußere (outer) Laudach is the output of the Laudachsee in Gmunden. It passes the areas of the municipalities Sankt Konrad, Gschwandt, Kirchham and Vorchdorf from the south.

The smaller tributary, the Innere (inner) or Dürre Laudach, has its source in Kirchham. It is formed by two sources, the Platzbach and the Edlbach. The water stems from three hills (Wiesberg, Hacklberg and Feichtenberghills) that lay like a horseshoe around the district Hagenmühle of Kirchham. This right tributary discharges from the south into the Äußere Laudach north of Vorchdorf.

The Laudach empties into the Alm about 5 km (3.1 mi) after the junction of the Äußere and Innere Laudach, several times interrupted by small weirs, in the southern area of the city of Bad Wimsbach.

There are a couple of artificial ponds along the Laudach.
