= Prince Ernst August of Hanover (born 1983) =

German financier and prince

Ernst August
- Hereditary Prince of Hanover
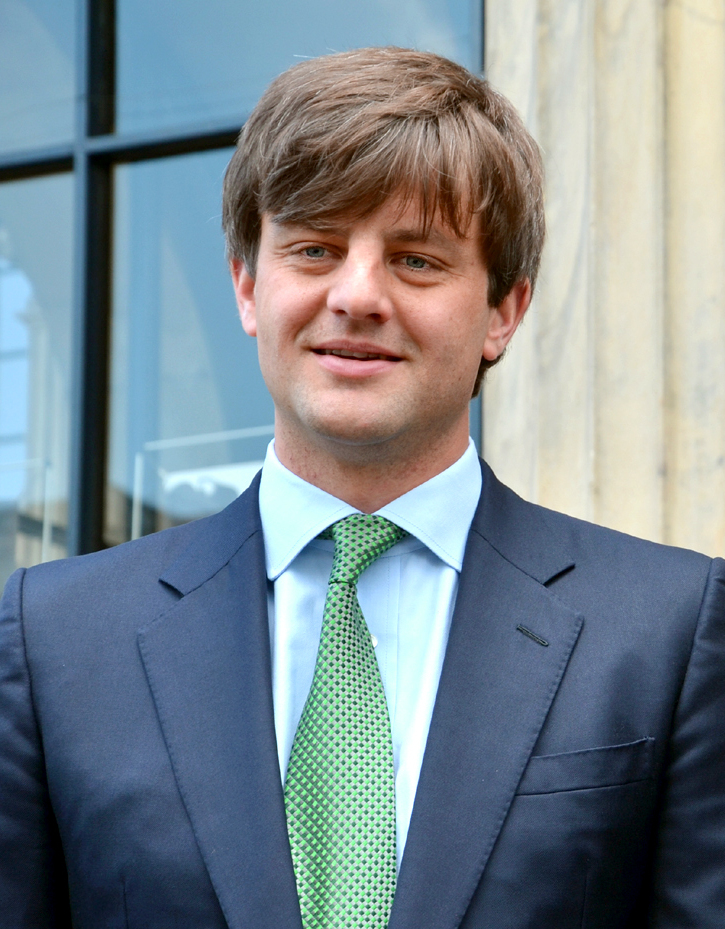
- Ernst August in 2014
- Born: 19 July 1983 (age 43); Hildesheim, Lower Saxony, West Germany
- Spouse: Ekaterina Igorievna Malysheva (m. 2017)
- Issue: Princess Elisabeth; Prince Welf August; Princess Eleonora; Princess Margarita
Names
- Ernst August Andreas Philipp Constantin Maximilian Rolf Stephan Ludwig Rudolph
- House: Hanover
- Father: Prince Ernst August of Hanover
- Mother: Chantal Hochuli

Ernst August, Hereditary Prince of Hanover (German: Ernst August Prinz von Hannover Herzog zu Braunschweig und Lüneburg, Königlicher Prinz von Großbritannien und Irland; born 19 July 1983) is a German financier and the eldest child of Ernst August, Prince of Hanover (head of the ancient House of Hanover which once ruled the Kingdom of Hanover and were rulers of Great Britain until 1901) and his first wife Chantal Hochuli. Due to his father's second marriage, he is also the stepson of Caroline, Princess of Hanover, a Monegasque Princess and the sister of Albert II of Monaco.

== Background ==
Ernst August and his younger brother Christian were born in Hildesheim, Lower Saxony, while their half-sister, Alexandra, was born in Austria and lives with her mother in Monaco. Ernst August was baptized on 15 October 1983 at Marienburg Castle, his godparents including Felipe VI of Spain and Constantine II of Greece.

Despite the family's residence in Germany through both World Wars, his paternal grandfather, as a descendant of Queen Victoria distantly in the British line of succession, obtained British citizenship for himself and his children in November 1956 under the Sophia Naturalization Act 1705. Their family owned property and conducted business in the post-war United Kingdom. Until his mid-teens, Ernst August and his brother lived at Hurlingham Lodge in London.

He also descends from Germany's last emperor, Wilhelm II, following whose abdication at the end of World War I the Hanovers also lost sovereignty over the Duchy of Brunswick, while retaining much of their continental personal property.

== Education ==
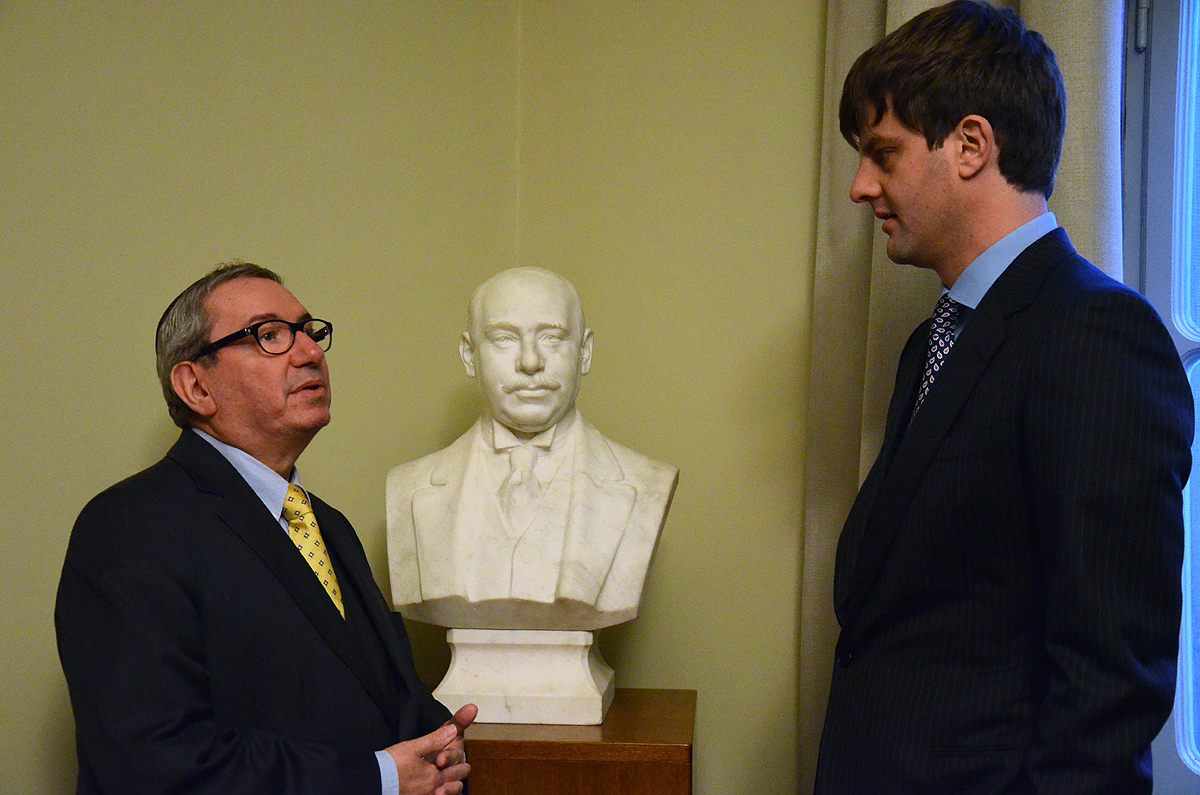
Prince Ernst August (right) and Andor Izsák, Cantor of Hanover, at the Seligmann Foundation for Jewish Music in Hanover, 2013

Ernst August began his secondary education at Malvern College, but ultimately completed that phase of his education with an International Baccalaureate back on the Continent. and He then studied history and national economy in New York City.

== Career and asset management ==
After moving back to London he worked in the banking business for some years. Among other jobs, he worked with an open-end fund of the Islamic Investment Bank in Bahrain and with a London investment bank specialized on financing smaller mining and technology companies in newly industrialized countries.

After his marriage in 2017 he and his wife moved to Hanover. In 2022 the couple moved to Gmunden, Austria, with their children.

Already in 2004, his father had signed over to him the German property of the House of Hanover, including gothic-revival Marienburg Castle, the agricultural estates of Calenberg Castle and the Fürstenhaus ("Princely House") at Herrenhausen Gardens in Hanover; the elaborate museum in this small palace, built by King George I of Great Britain in 1720, has been closed to the public since 2011. Since 2004, the prince has taken over many representative tasks on behalf of his father.

The father remained in charge of the Austrian family assets until 2013 when he was removed from the chairmanship of a family foundation based in Liechtenstein, the Duke of Cumberland Foundation, which holds the properties near Gmunden in Austria, the Hanovers' main residence in exile after 1866 when their Kingdom of Hanover was annexed by Prussia. Instead, the younger Ernst August was put in charge, reportedly for negligence on part of his father, at the initiative of the foundation's trustee Prince Michael of Liechtenstein. The foundation manages vast forests, "Cumberland Wildlife Park", the "Queen's Villa", the "Hubertihaus" hunting lodge (where his father lives) and the mausoleum at Cumberland Castle (which itself was sold after World War II) In 2017 Ernst August the Elder filed legal action to recover chairmanship.

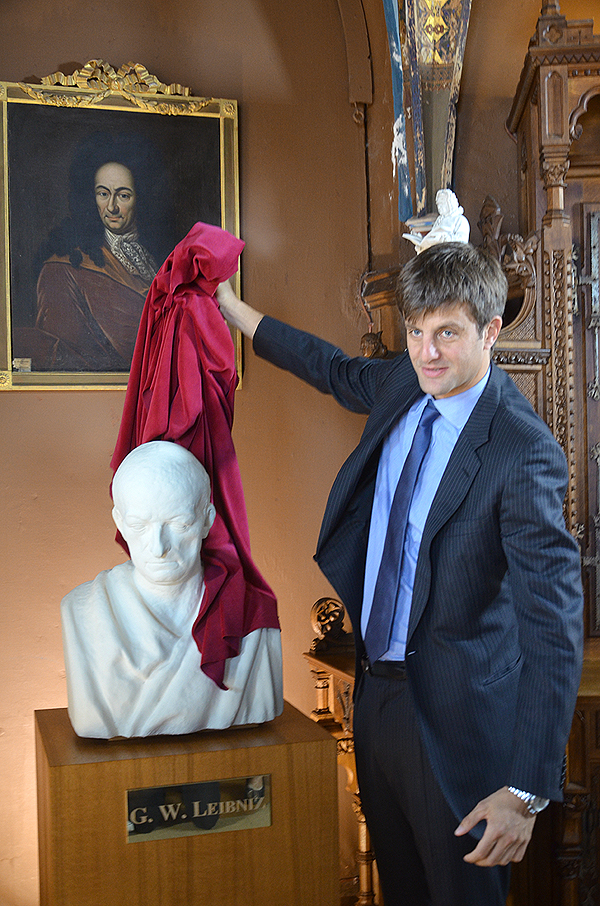
Ernst August revealing a bust of Leibniz at Marienburg Castle (2016)

In 2014, Ernst August lent a number of paintings and objects for a Lower Saxony state exhibition, When the Royals came from Hanover - The rulers of Hanover on England's throne, which included exhibits in five museums and castles under the auspices of Charles, Prince of Wales. Thirty of more than 1000 items were contributed by Elizabeth II, including the State Crown of George I, while Ernst August provided the king's famous Augsburg silver throne and other furniture dating to 1720. He hosted a parallel exhibition, The Way to the Crown, at Marienburg Castle until through 2016, displaying—among other items—the crown jewels of the Kingdom of Hanover.

In 2005 he sold large parts of the family's art and furniture collections in an auction at Sotheby's, with a result of 44 million euros. He had initially planned to allocate the funds in a foundation for the renovation and maintenance of Marienburg Castle; however, he was forced to use most of it to settle his father's debt, which, at the time, had been unknown to him, as he told a newspaper in 2019. In 2011 he sold the manor house and stables at Calenberg, retaining the land. Stating that its proceeds wouldn't suffice to maintain Marienburg Castle, infested with dry rot and threatened by static problems, he entered into negotiations with the State of Lower Saxony regarding the future of the castle, and its renovation, estimated at 27 million euros. In November 2018 he announced that he planned to transfer the castle to a state-controlled foundation (the Hanoverian Monasteries' Chamber, founded by his family in 1569, which still owns most of the secularized monasteries and ecclesiastical estates of the former kingdom), at a symbolic sale price of 1 euro, with the foundation undertaking renovation. The remaining art collection was planned to be kept in the castle, with parts purchased by the state, parts kept by the family and lent to the state, and parts transferred to a foundation controlled by both the family and the state. The transaction, however, was stopped by his father's legal action, seeking to regain ownership.

== Marriage and issue ==
In the summer of 2016 Ernst August became engaged to Ekaterina Igorievna Malysheva (born 30 July 1986, Apatity, Soviet Russia), a Russian designer, general manager of Audiotube and founder of EKAT, and daughter of Igor Malyshev and Svetlana Malysheva. Days before the wedding, his father, the elder Ernst August publicly stated concerns about potential adverse impacts on family assets if the younger Ernst August were to marry his chosen fiancée. Despite the dynastic tradition of obtaining the head of the House of Hanover's express, prior authorization for an heir's marriage in accordance with an 1836 Hanoverian house law (as Ernst August's father had done when marrying his sons' future mother in 1981), the bridegroom's father declared his intention to withhold consent for his son's marriage to Ekaterina Malysheva, reportedly in a dispute over family assets.

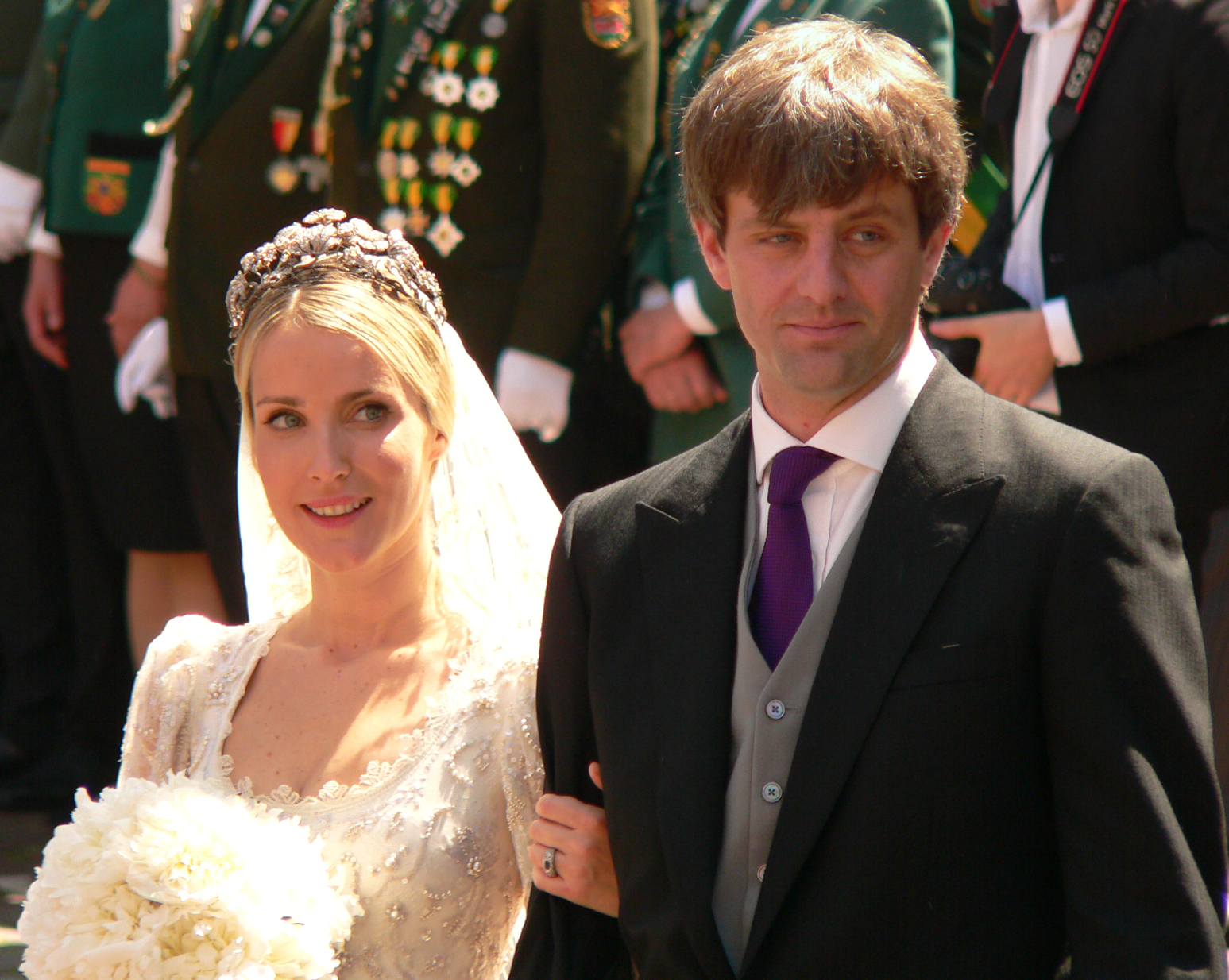
Ekaterina Malysheva and Prince Ernst August after their wedding, 2017

Nonetheless, the civil marriage took place on 6 July 2017 in Hanover's New Town Hall and was conducted by the mayor of Hanover, Stefan Schostok. The church marriage took place on 8 July 2017 in the Hanover Market Church at which the former Landesbischof of the Evangelical-Lutheran Church of Hanover, Horst Hirschler, presided. The bride was escorted by her father, Igor Malyshev. Her wedding dress was the work of Lebanese designer Sandra Mansour, and she wore a tiara that belonged to the former Kaiser Wilhelm II's only daughter, Princess Victoria Louise of Prussia.

Among the wedding guests were: Prince Christian of Hanover, Princess Alexandra of Hanover, Andrea Casiraghi, Tatiana Santo Domingo, Pierre Casiraghi, Beatrice Borromeo, Charlotte Casiraghi, Georg Friedrich, Prince of Prussia and his wife Princess Sophie, Crown Prince Pavlos of Greece and his wife Crown Princess Marie-Chantal, Hereditary Prince Hubertus of Saxe-Coburg and Gotha, Alexander, Prince of Schaumburg-Lippe and Princess Elisabeth von Thurn und Taxis. The father of the groom, Prince Ernst August, did not attend the wedding. From the church, the royal couple rode in a horse carriage to Herrenhausen Gardens for the wedding reception in the Gallery Building. In the evening, a ball took place at Marienburg Castle.

The couple have four children:

- Elisabeth Prinzessin von Hannover (born 22 February 2018)
- Welf August Prinz von Hannover (born 14 March 2019)
- Eleonora Prinzessin von Hannover (born 26 July 2021)
- Margarita Prinzessin von Hannover (born 18 July 2024)

== Titles and styles ==
In Germany, the legal privileges of royalty and nobility were abolished in 1919; thereafter for legal purposes, hereditary titles form part of the surname only. Thus, while descendants of non-dynastic marriages may have a legal right to the use of "Prinz/Prinzessin von Hannover Herzog/Herzogin zu Braunschweig und Lüneburg Königlicher Prinz/Prinzessin von Großbritannien und Irland" as surnames, they are not recognized as bearing rank, styles titles or membership appertaining to the House of Hanover, according to its house rules. Nor is the title "Prince/ss of Great Britain and Ireland", re-claimed by the deposed House of Hanover in 1931, accorded by British sovereigns to members thereof born after 30 November 1917.
