= Alm (river) =

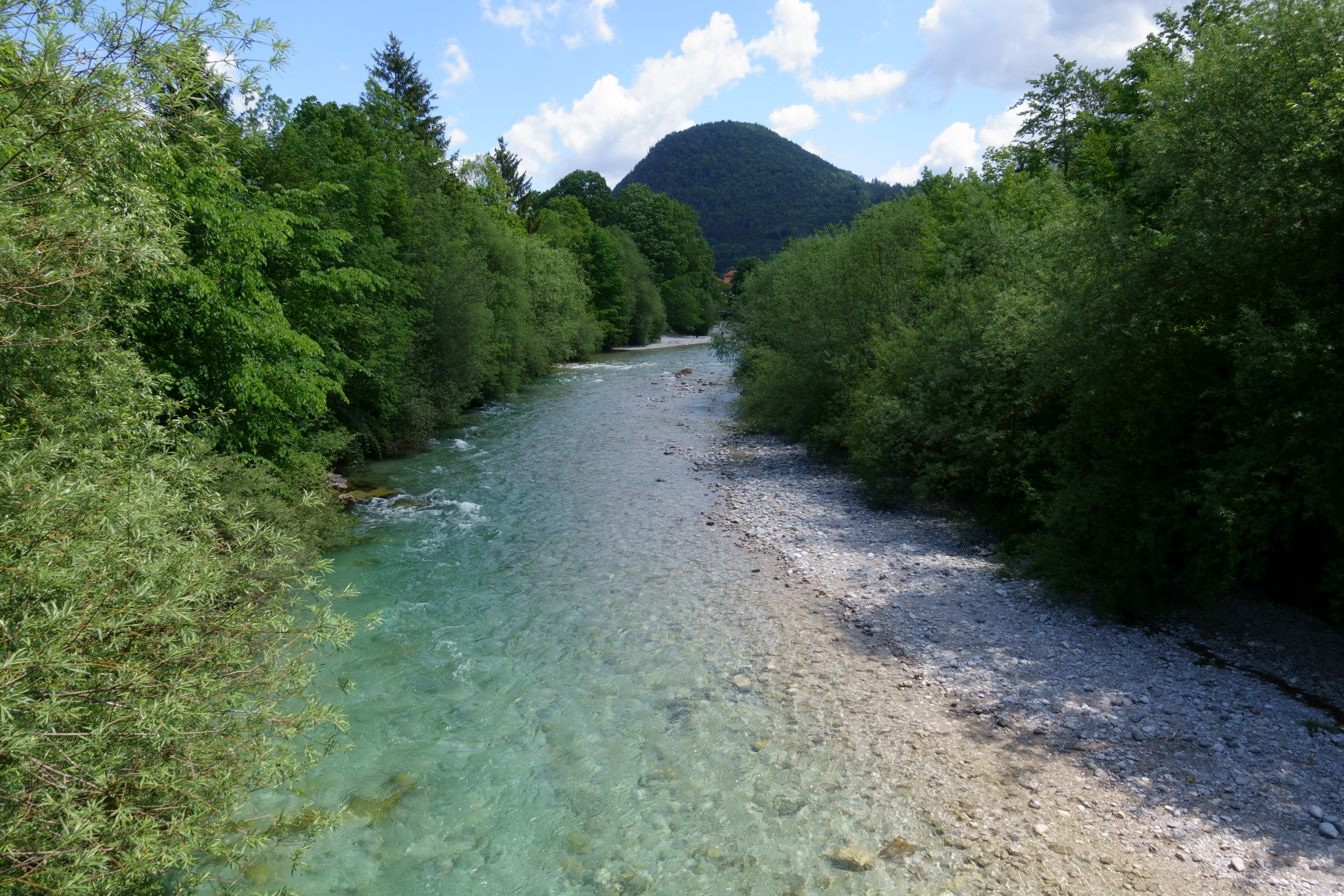
- Alm in Grünau im Almtal

Location
- Country: Austria

Physical characteristics
- Source
  - location: Almsee
- Mouth
  - location: Traun (Fischlham)
  - coordinates: 48.0906°N 13.9186°E
- Length: 49.7 km (30.9 mi)

Basin features
- Progression: Traun→ Danube→ Black Sea

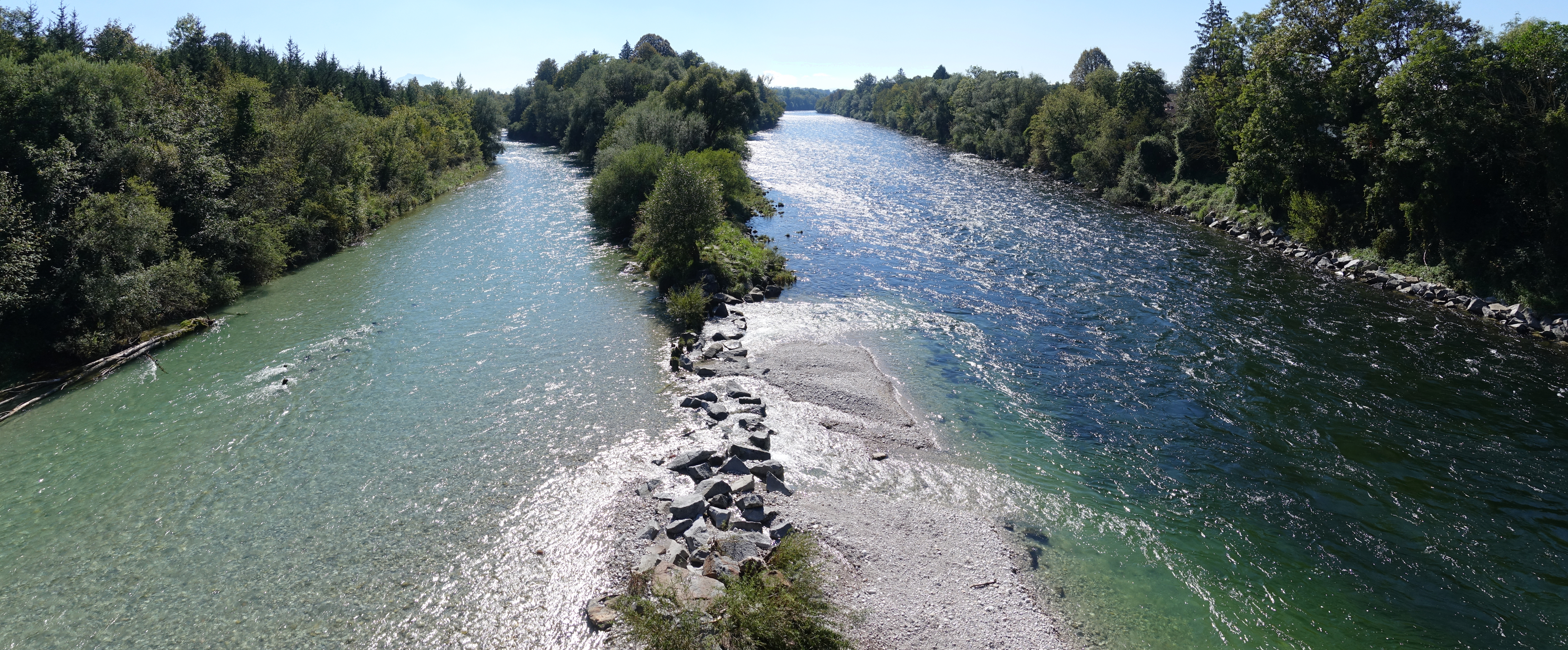
Confluence of rivers Alm (left) and Traun (right)

Alm is a river in the Austrian state of Upper Austria.

The Alm's source is lake Almsee. It is a right tributary of the Traun, which meets near the town of Fischlham. Its largest tributary is the Laudach.

Municipalities along the river are Grünau im Almtal, Scharnstein, Pettenbach, Vorchdorf, Steinerkirchen an der Traun and Bad Wimsbach-Neydharting.

The quality of the water is potable. Fishes in the Alm include brown trout, rainbow trout, brook trout and grayling.
