= Gmunden District =

Coordinates: 47.901°N 13.794°E

Gmunden District Bezirk Gmunden
- District
- Country: Austria
- State: Upper Austria
- Number of municipalities: 20
- Administrative seat: Gmunden

Government
  - District Governor: Alois Lanz

Area
  - Total: 1,432.6 km^{2} (553.1 sq mi)

Population (2001)
  - Total: 99,640
  - Density: 69.55/km^{2} (180.1/sq mi)
- Time zone: UTC+01:00 (CET)
  - Summer (DST): UTC+02:00 (CEST)
- Vehicle registration: GM

Bezirk Gmunden is a district of the state of Upper Austria in Austria.

== Municipalities ==
Towns (Städte) are indicated in boldface; market towns (Marktgemeinden) in italics; suburbs, hamlets and other subdivisions of a municipality are indicated in small characters.

- Altmünster
- Bad Goisern
- **Bad Ischl**
- Ebensee
- **Gmunden**
- Gosau
- Grünau im Almtal
- Gschwandt
- Hallstatt
- Kirchham
- **Laakirchen**
- Obertraun
- Ohlsdorf
- Pinsdorf
- Roitham
- Sankt Konrad
- Sankt Wolfgang im Salzkammergut
- Scharnstein
- Traunkirchen
- Vorchdorf
