= Almsee =

Lake in Austria

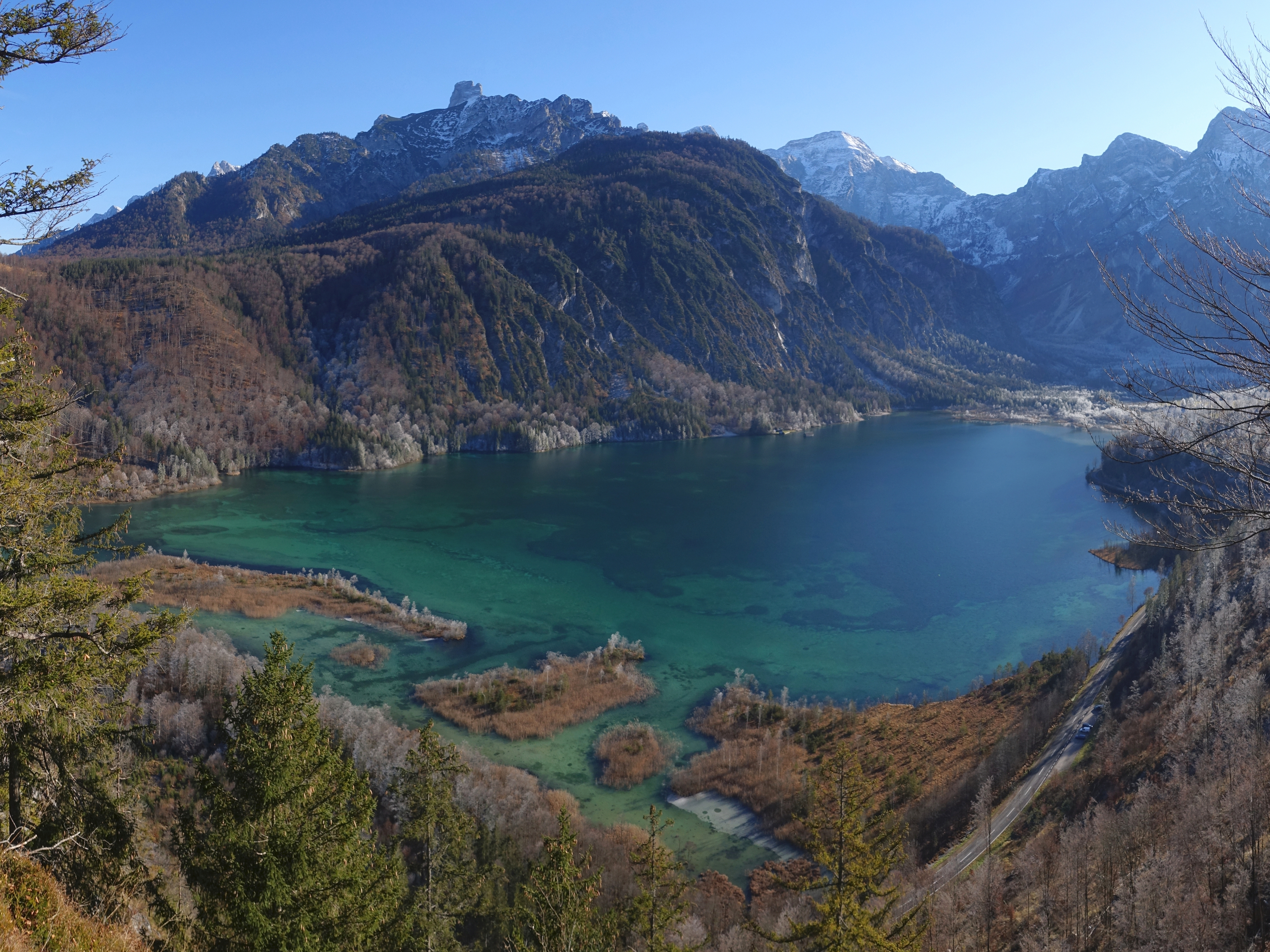
- View from Ameisstein

- Location within Austria
- Location: Grünau im Almtal
- Coordinates: 47°45′N 13°57.5′E
- Lake type: Oligotrophic
- Primary outflows: Alm
- Catchment area: 41.4 km^{2} (16.0 sq mi)
- Basin countries: Austria
- Designation: Nature reserve
- Max. length: 2.3 km (1.4 mi)
- Max. width: 700 m (2,300 ft)
- Surface area: 0.85 km^{2} (0.33 sq mi)
- Average depth: 2.5 m (8 ft 2 in)
- Max. depth: 5 m (16 ft)
- Water volume: 2,100,000 m^{3} (1,700 acre⋅ft)
- Residence time: 10 days
- Surface elevation: 589 m (1,932 ft)

Almsee, English sometimes Lake Alm, is a lake in Upper Austria's part of the Salzkammergut in the Almtal valley, 11 kilometers (6.8 mi) south of the village of Grünau im Almtal. The lake lies in the northern portion of the Totes Gebirge mountains and is about 2.3 kilometers (1.4 mi) by 700 meters (2,300 ft) wide.

The lake drains through the Alm River. Since 1965, the area around the Almsee is under nature conservation. Konrad Lorenz made important observations of the greylag goose at the lake.

Near the lake is Hubertihaus, a hunting lodge of the House of Hanover.
