= Laudachsee =

Lake in Austria

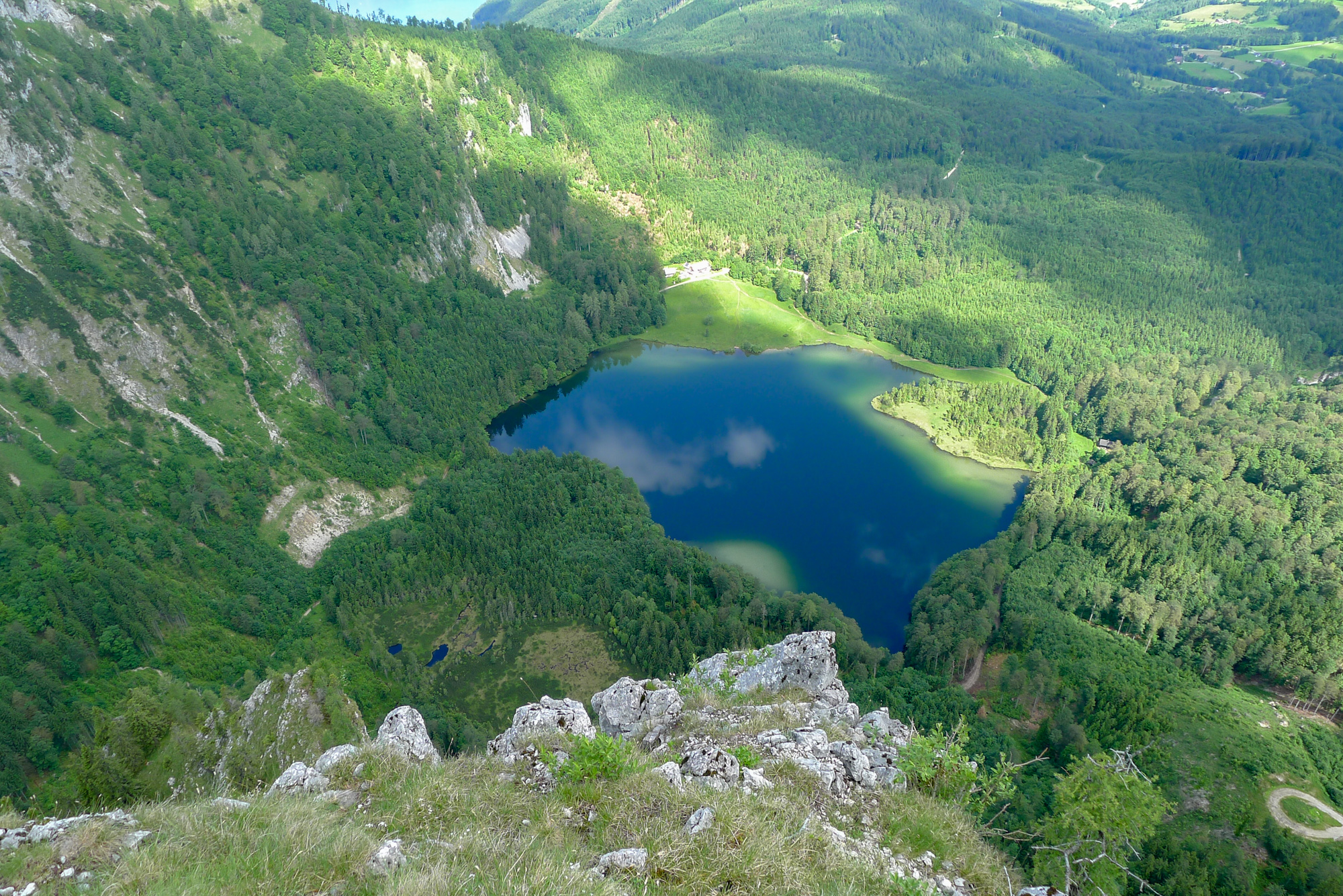
- View from Katzenstein down to the Laudachsee.

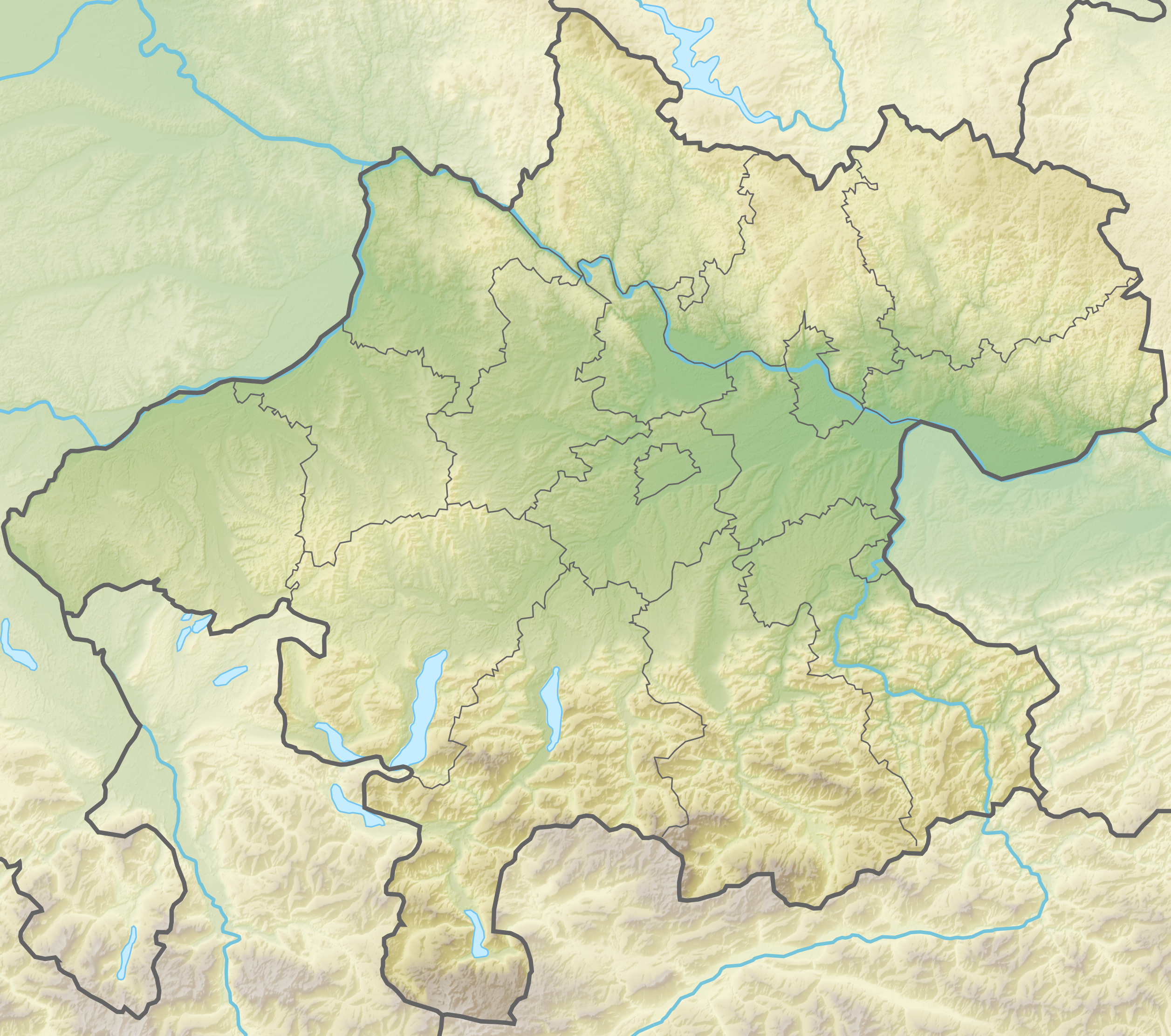
- Location within Upper Austria
- Location: Salzkammergut, Upper Austria
- Coordinates: 47°52′44″N 13°51′10″E
- Primary outflows: Laudach
- Basin countries: Austria
- Max. length: 400 m (1,300 ft)
- Max. width: 400 m (1,300 ft)
- Surface area: 0.1 km^{2} (0.039 sq mi)
- Average depth: 15–26 m (49–85 ft)
- Max. depth: 26 m (85 ft)
- Surface elevation: 894 m (2,933 ft)

Lake Laudachsee is a alpine lake situated between the Grünberg and the Traunstein in the Salzkammergut region of Upper Austria, within the municipal boundaries of Gmunden. Lake Laudach, together with the adjacent lowland moors and wet meadows to the north and the raised bog to the south, has been designated a nature reserve since 2000.

== Geography ==
Lake Laudach is approximately 400 metres long and equally wide, with a maximum depth of 13 metres. The lake is situated at the deepest point of the cirque formed by the Laudach Glacier and is dammed to the north by moraine ridges. It is fed partly by a small stream that rises at the northern foot of the Katzenstein and flows above ground, and partly underground via small ditches leading from the Laudach Moor to the south. Lake Laudach drains via the River Laudach on its north-eastern shore.

As Lake Laudach is shaded from the south-east to the south-west by the Katzenstein and the Traunstein in winter, and is also situated in a fog-free area, a solid layer of ice forms rapidly even in mild winters, often not breaking up until late spring. This is usually followed by a very rapid rise in temperature in spring. In summer, the water can reach swimming temperatures.

== Hiking ==
The lake can be easily reached from the Grünberg cable car’s mountain station in about an hour via a footpath. It can be used as a starting point for a mountain hike to the Traunstein (1,691 m.a.A.) and the Katzenstein (1,349 m). The route via the Hohe Scharte, the Mair-Alm and the Traunsee allows you to walk all the way round the Traunstein. The Ramsauer Alm inn is situated on a hill above the Laudachsee.

== Legends ==
Lake Laudachsee is featured in a well known legend called "The Giant Erla and the Mermaid of Lake Laudachsee".

It tells the story of the giant Erla, who wanders through the mountains and one day finds a mermaid behind the Traunstein, the mistress of Lake Laudachsee. He isn’t sure whether to speak to her, as they are so different, yet she is anything but shy and charms the giant with her playful and vivacious nature. Time flies by, and when the giant has to leave, he promises her that he will return every day. He keeps his promise, and so they meet throughout the summer, but when the weather turns colder again, their meetings come to an end. So Erla has an idea, he builds a castle for them in the Traunsee.

He breaks large blocks of stone from the Traunstein and throws them into the Traunsee until a small island forms just off Gmunden, on which he builds Ort Castle with the help of many people. After it is finished and the weather warms up again, Erla takes the mermaid to the old witch of the Traunstein, who then transforms the two into a normal couple. He becomes smaller and she grows normal legs and feet. There is a grand wedding and the two live happily in their castle.

After a year, however, the mermaid grows increasingly sad, she misses the freedom she had in Lake Laudach, and life in nature amongst the animals. She spends more and more time in Lake Traunsee, but without her fish tail and her former abilities, she simply no longer belongs in the water. She withers away like a flower after summer, and it isn’t long before Erla is alone again. Saddened by his loss, he climbed the Traunstein to never been seen again. He left the castle to the humans as a thank you for their support.
