= Eggenberg Castle, Vorchdorf =

Austrian castle

Coordinates: 47°59′23″N 13°55′20″E

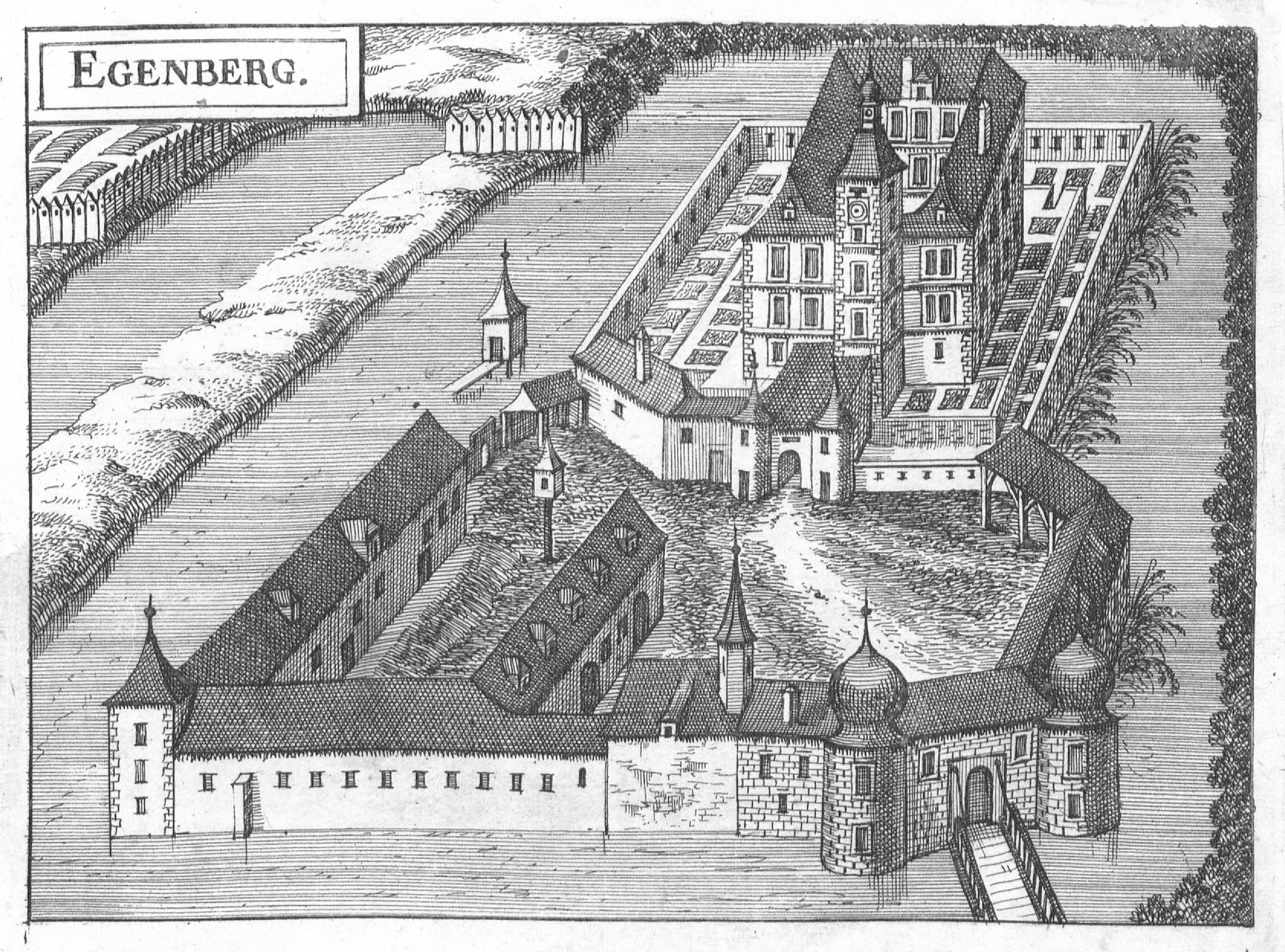
Engraving of Eggenberg castle in Vorchdorf, Upper Austria (1674)

Eggenberg Castle (German: Schloss Eggenberg) is a castle located in Vorchdorf, Upper Austria. It is famous for its brewery.

== History ==
Beer has been brewed at Eggenberg Castle (German: Schloss Eggenberg) since the 14th century. Commercial brewing at its location began in 1681 when Michael Weismann purchased the property from the Monastery of Kremsmünster. It has been owned by the Forstinger-Stöhr family since 1803.

== Samichlaus ==
Samichlaus is one of the strongest lager beers in the world, at 14% alcohol by volume. The name means Santa Claus in Swiss German. It was originally brewed by the Hürlimann Brewery in Zürich, Switzerland.

Hürlimann's founder Albert Hürlimann was a world leader in the scientific study of yeast, and the brewery has a long history of yeast development. The Samichlaus Christmas beer was first brewed in 1979 for sale in 1980. Production continued annually until 1997, when the brewery closed. In 2000, it returned, this time produced by Schloss Eggenberg in collaboration with the original Hürlimann brewers, using the original Hürlimann Samichlaus recipe. The beer is only brewed once a year, on December 6 (which is the day of Saint Nicholas), which makes it a relatively rare brew. It is in the style of a Bavarian Doppelbock, and undergoes unusually long fermentation by traditional cold lagering over a ten-month period, leaving very little residual sugar in the final beer.
