= Cumberland Castle =

Former royal Hanoverian residence in Gmunden, Austria

Coordinates: 47°55′38″N 13°48′30″E

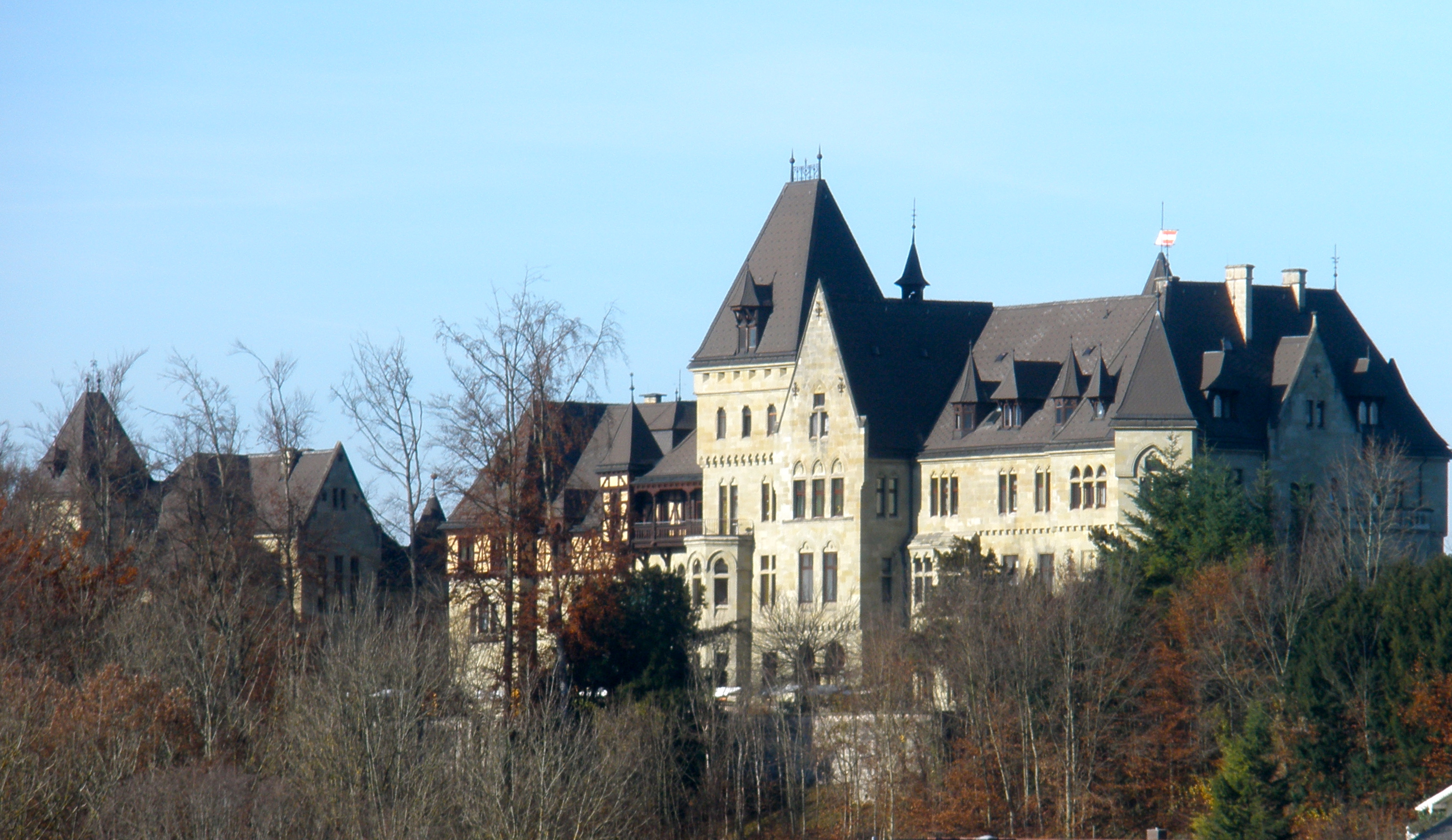
Cumberland Castle in 2012

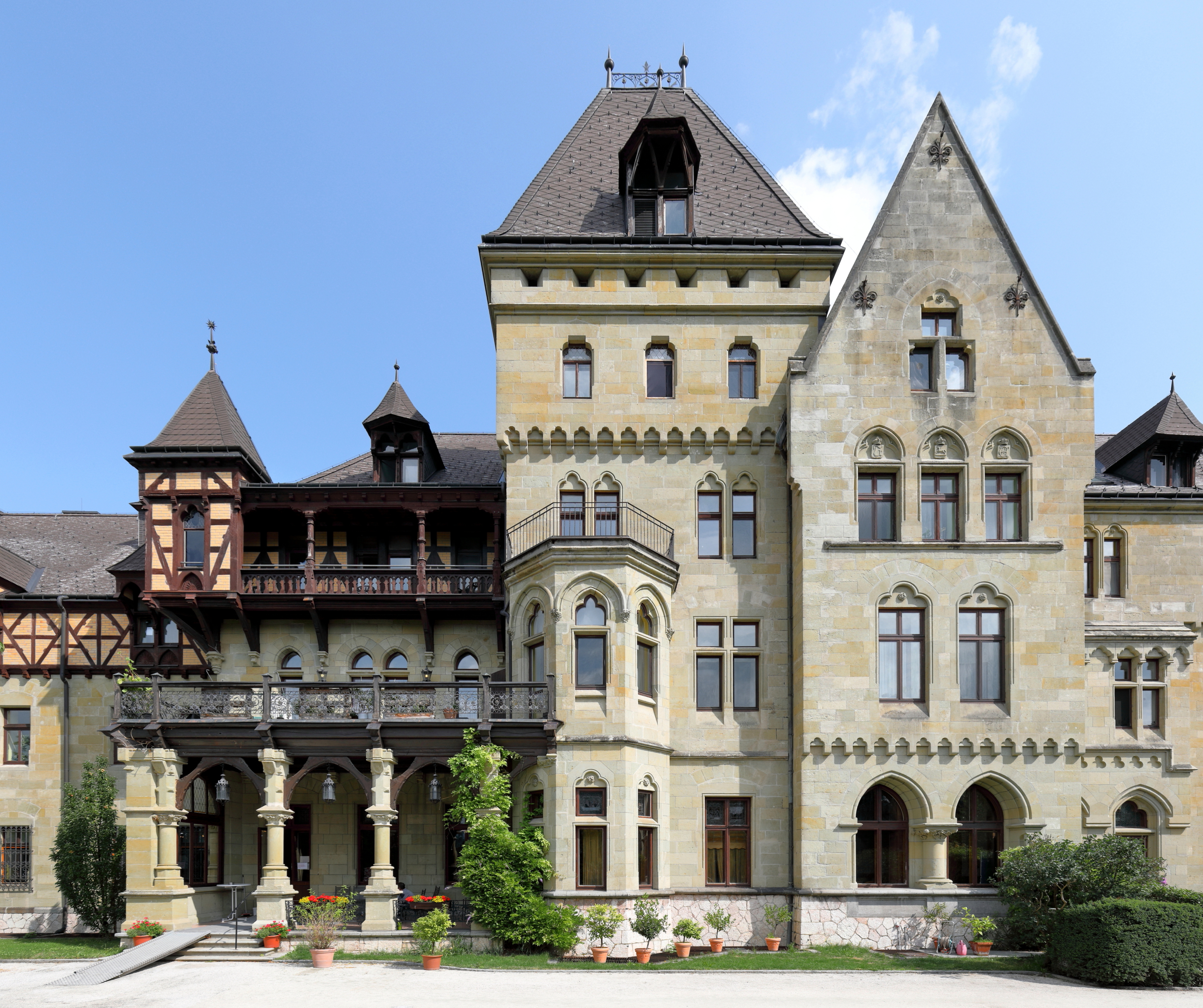
Schloss Cumberland, the main façade (2018)

Cumberland Castle (German: Schloss Cumberland, pronounced [ʃlɔs ˈkʊmbɐlant]) is a former royal palace in Gmunden, Austria. When the House of Hanover lost the throne of the Kingdom of Hanover after it was annexed by Prussia, its members went to Austria into exile. Gmunden became their exile seat, where they constructed Cumberland Castle in 1882. The palace is designed in a Tudor revival style. The royal family lived here until the 1930s. After the Second World War, the castle became a state nursing home. It is now owned by the State of Upper Austria.

== History ==
On 2 October 1866, Prussia annexed the Kingdom of Hanover as a result of the Austro-Prussian War, which Austria and its ally Hanover lost. The King of Hanover, George V (1819–1878), became a landless refugee due to these events, relying on the hospitality of his relatives and friendly princes. He and his son, the crown prince, initially went to Vienna to his wartime ally, Emperor Franz Joseph I. Here they lived at the Cumberland palace in the Penzinger Strasse.

=== The Hanoverian royal family (the Guelphs) comes to Gmunden ===
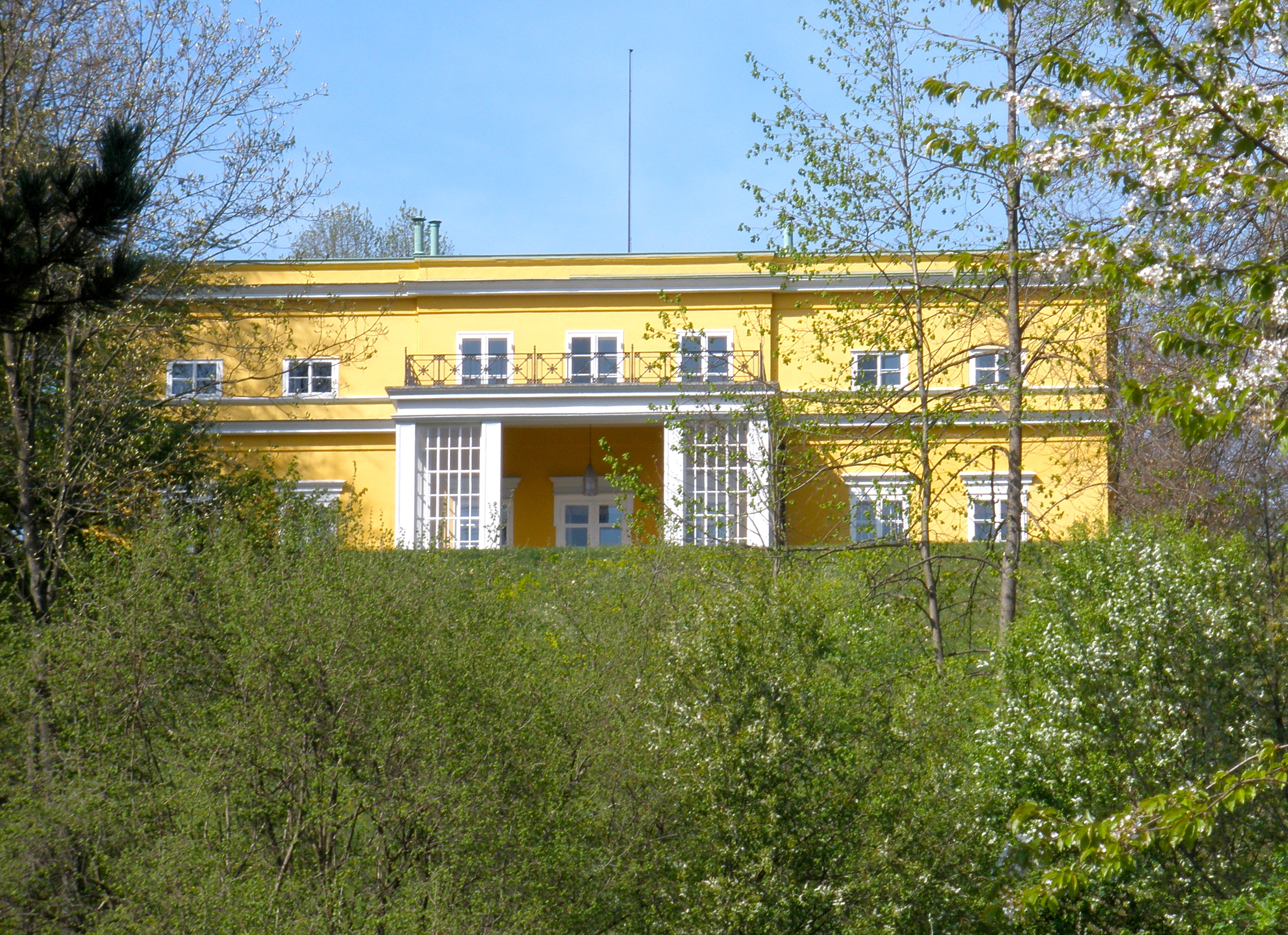
The Queen's villa in Gmunden

In the spring of 1868, the imperial court in Vienna came to Salzkammergut for a spa retreat in Gmunden. The former Hanoverian royal family joined as well. They stayed in "Villa Redtenbacher", which was soon purchased and became their main seat in Austria. It was a neoclassical villa constructed in 1838 (then named Villa Thun). The Tuscany branch of the Habsburg family also settled in Gmunden in 1870, in "Villa Toscana".

The blind King George V died in Paris in 1878 and was buried in the crypt of St. George's Chapel at Windsor Castle. His widow, Marie, lived in the Gmunden Villa until her death in 1907. The villa has since been named the Queen's Villa (German: Königinvilla). It remains property of the royal family up to this day.

=== Crown prince Ernest Augustus, Duke of Cumberland and Teviotdale ===
Ernst Augustus, 3rd Duke of Cumberland and crown prince of Hanover

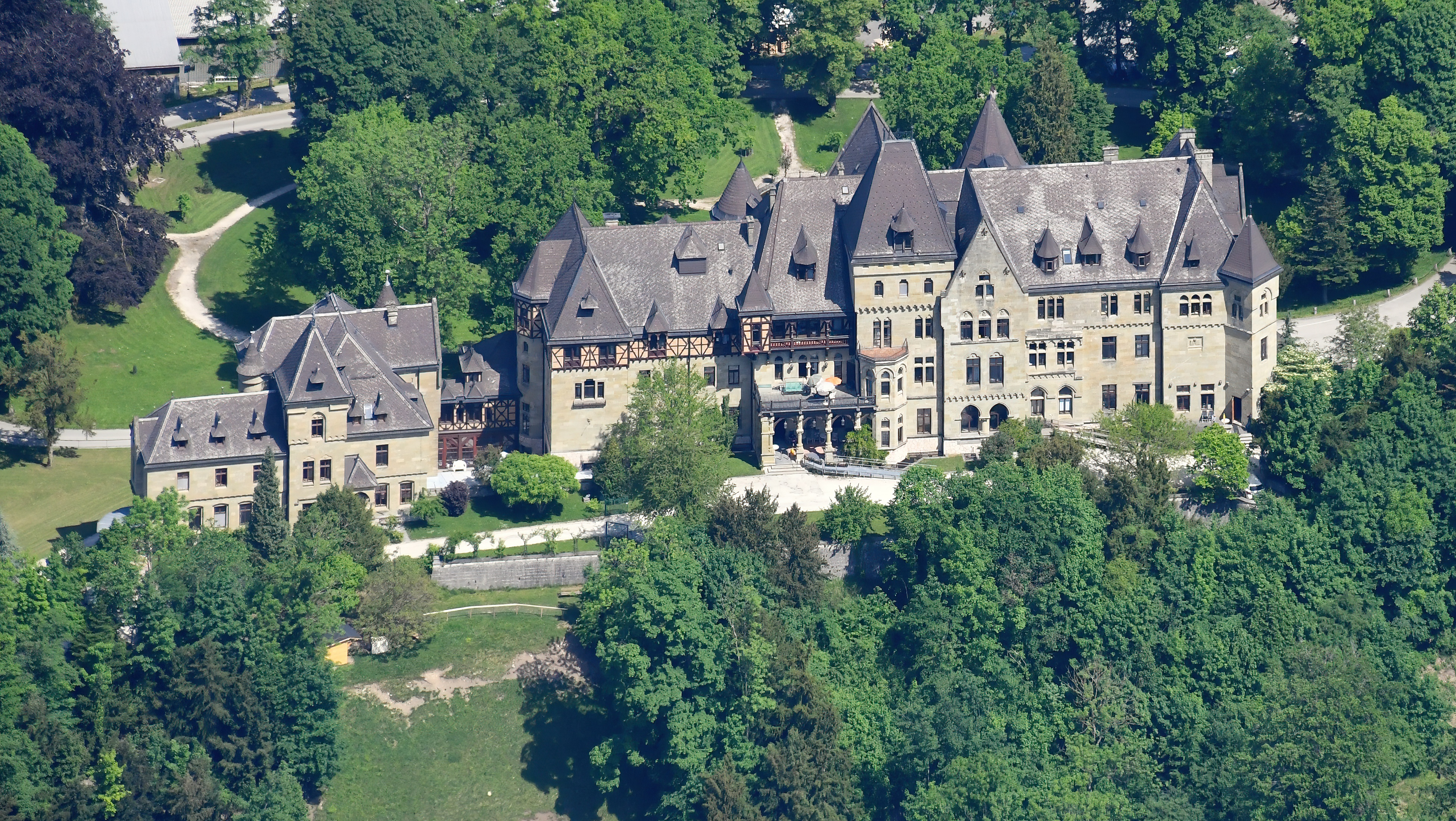
Schloss Cumberland seen from the air

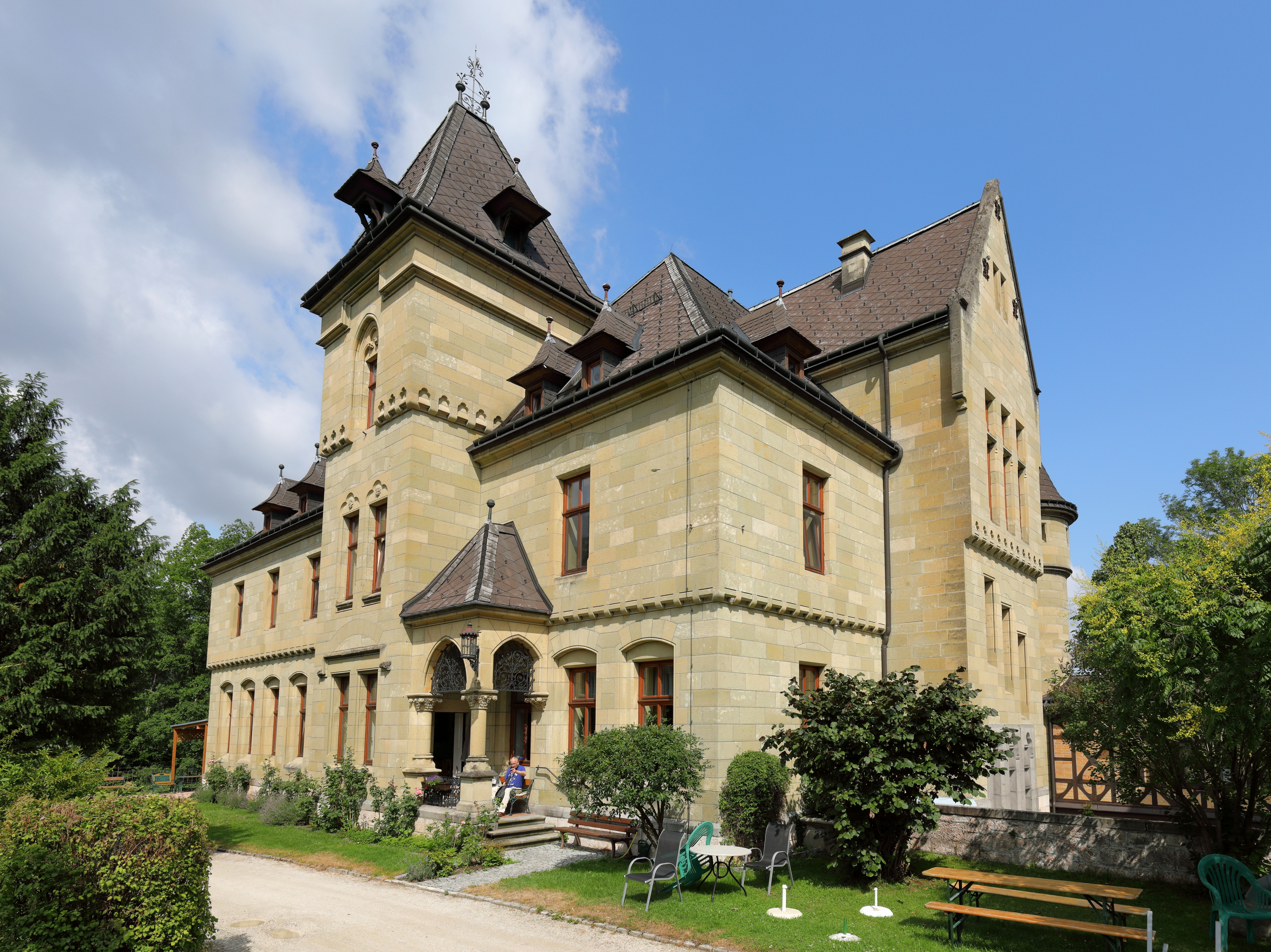
The Prinzenstöckl

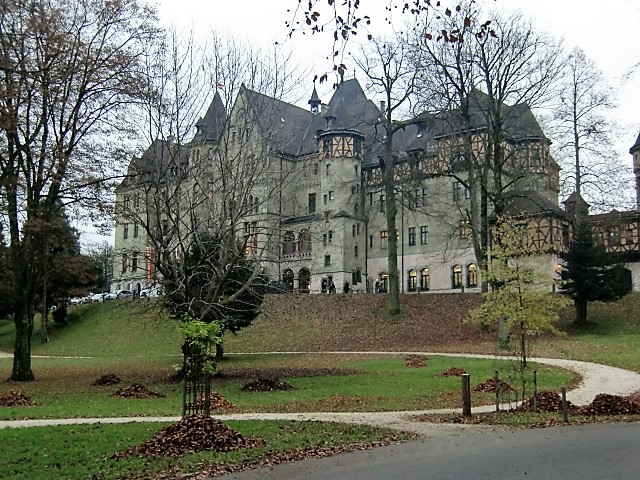
Cumberland Castle from the park

In 1882, George V's son, Ernest Augustus (1845–1923), Crown Prince of Hanover, and 3rd Duke of Cumberland and Teviotdale, decided to build his own castle. He acquired land near the Queen's Villa on a hill north of the centre of Gmunden above the Krottensee. He commissioned the Hanoverian architect Ferdinand Schorbach to design a castle in gothic revival style.

Construction started on 15 June 1882, and by 15 September 1886, the Guelph family moved into the extensive and lavishly furnished castle complex. The palace was more intended for representation than to live in due to its size. It is the largest castle in Upper Austria built in historicism style. Materials used included red marble from Ebensee am Traunsee, granite from Schärding, and sandstone from Regensburg. Great emphasis was placed on artistic decoration, and a series of splendidly appointed rooms were created.

At that time, the world-famous treasures of the Guelph family were stored in the castle, the Guelph Treasure (German: die Welfenschatz), including the so-called Guelph Bible (German: die Welfenbibel) as its centrepiece.

The chapel was constructed a few years later just like the "Prinzenstöckl". The chapel contained notable altar paintings from the school of Lucas Cranach. The Prinzenstöckl became a library building.

From 1886 until his death in 1923, the castle was the residence of the exiled Crown Prince. Ernest Augustus, his mother, and several other family members are buried in the mausoleum next to the castle.

=== Gmunden and the Guelphs ===
The Hanoverians were an important economic factor for Gmunden. Cumberland Castle was a popular meeting place for European high nobility. The court included over 200 people. The ducal family was very engaged in the city's cultural and social affairs and significantly supported the construction of the Protestant church in Gmunden (1871–75). They were extremely generous patrons of the city, providing notable donations for canal and road construction, the Esplanade, the soup kitchen for the needy, and financial support for students and retired soldiers. The naming of Georgstraße after King George V was one of the signs of gratitude and connection of the city with the ducal family.

=== The Guelphs move to Blankenburg ===
As the castle was too big to reside in and too expensive to maintain, the Crown prince's son, Ernest Augustus (1887–1953), Duke of Brunswick, and his wife Victoria Louise of Prussia (1892–1980) decide to move to Blankenburg castle in the Harz. Cumberland Castle itself was converted into a museum dedicated to the Guelph family.

In 1938, the National Socialists took possession of the castle and changed it into a training centre, a so-called Gauschulungsburg. From 1940 to 1945, it served as a military hospital.

=== Cumberland Castle post 1945 ===
After the Second World War, the Republic of Austria took over Cumberland Castle. From 1947 to 1972, the castle served as a tuberculosis hospital. After thoroughly disinfecting the building, it was converted into a state nursing home, and the nursing service officially started on 8 January 1973. After the duke of Brunswick died, ownership of the castle passed to his only daughter, Frederica of Hanover (1917–1981), Queen of Greece.

On 1 January 1979, Cumberland castle was purchased by the state of Upper Austria. It is now named the "Landespflege- und Betreuungszentrum Schloss Cumberland" (State Care and Support Center Castle Cumberland).

The associated estate including forests and hunting areas near Grünau im Almtal, the Cumberland Wildlife Park, with the hunting lodge Hubertihaus, are still owned by a Liechtenstein based family foundation of the House of Hanover, the Duke of Cumberland Foundation.

=== Cumberland Castle today ===
The castle was last renovated in 2000 and is frequently used as a filming location. Modifications were made to meet the needs of residents and staff, such as installing an elevator and sealing the numerous chimneys. Since 1 November 2002, patients in a vegetative state have been cared for in a coma unit here.

The castle's fixed interior furnishings are largely preserved and testify to the castle's once magnificent original interior. The castle and, in particular, the state rooms are occasionally open for public viewing on special occasions.

== Literature ==
- Piringer, Karl (1979). Gmundner Chronik. 1900–1918 (in German). Gmunden: Stadtgemeinde Gmunden.
- Spitzbart, Ingrid (2003). "König Georg V. von Hannover und seine Familie im Gmundener Exil". In Keindorf, Gudrun; Moritz, Thomas (eds.). Größer noch als Heinrich der Löwe." König Georg V. von Hannover als Bauherr und Identitätsstifter Hrsg. im Auftrag des Vereins Freunde der Burg Plesse e.V. Begleitband zur Ausstellung der Staats- und Universitätsbibliothek Göttingen in der Paulinerkirche (in German). Duderstadt: Mecke Verlag. pp. 67–80. ISBN 3-936617-16-3.
- Schießer, Heinz (2017). Die Welfen am Traunsee – 130 Jahre Schloss Cumberland (in German). Göttingen: MatricMedia Verlag (Heinrich Prinz von Hanover). p. 191. ISBN 978-3-946891-02-4.
