= Laakirchen =

Laakirchen Laakircha
- Municipality
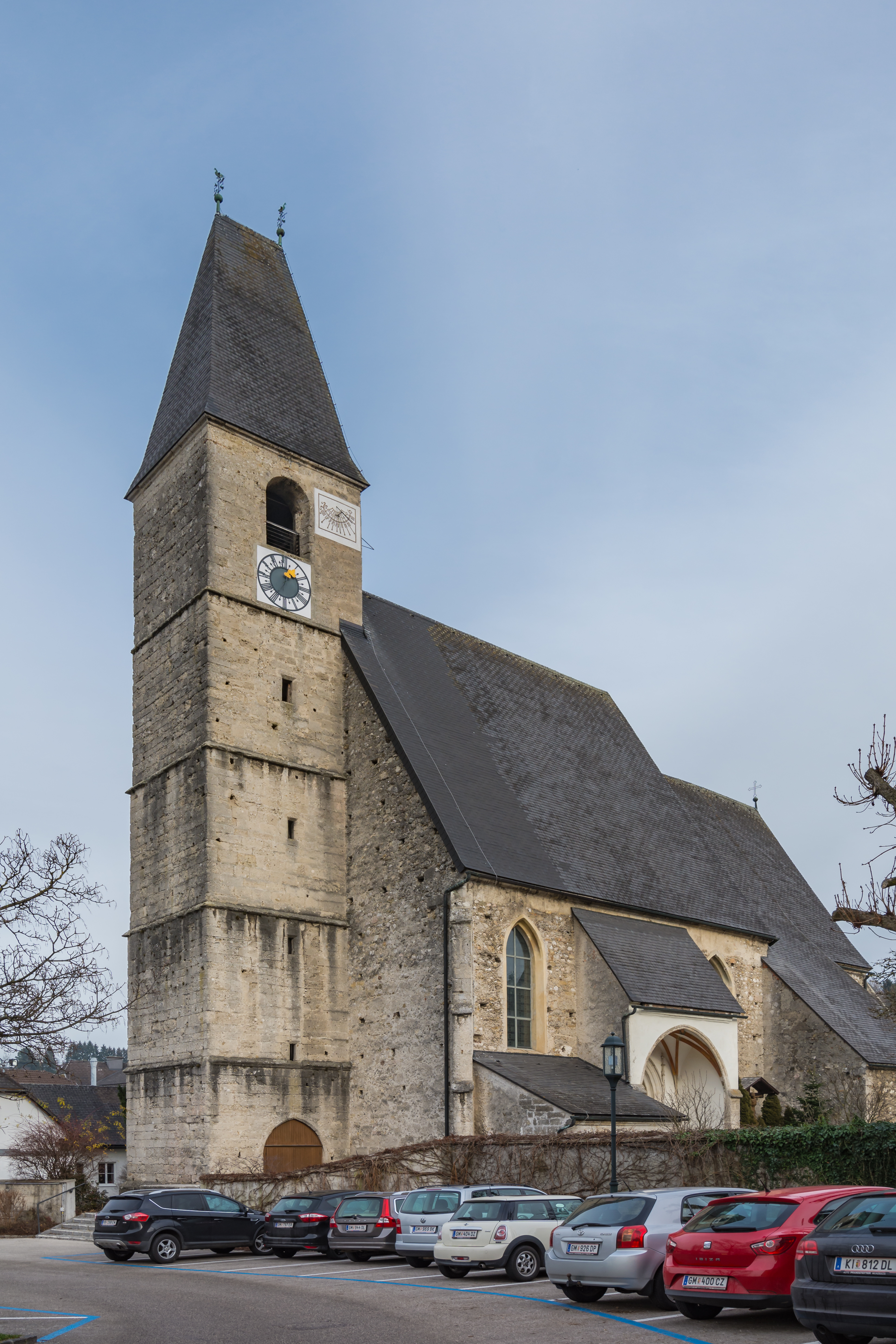
- Parish Church of Saint Valentine

- Coat of arms

- Location within Austria
- Coordinates: 47°58′58″N 13°49′27″E
- Country: Austria
- State: Upper Austria
- District: Gmunden

Government
  - Mayor: Fritz Feichtinger (SPÖ)

Area
  - Total: 32.47 km^{2} (12.54 sq mi)
- Elevation: 441 m (1,447 ft)

Population (2018-01-01)
  - Total: 9,861
  - Density: 303.7/km^{2} (786.6/sq mi)
- Time zone: UTC+1 (CET)
  - Summer (DST): UTC+2 (CEST)
- Postal code: 4663
- Area code: 07613
- Vehicle registration: GM
- Website: www.laakirchen.at

Laakirchen (Central Bavarian: Laakircha) is a municipality in the district of Gmunden in the Austrian state of Upper Austria.

== Population ==
Historical population
Year	Pop.	±%
1869	2,461	—
1880	3,132	+27.3%
1890	3,402	+8.6%
1900	4,032	+18.5%
1910	4,658	+15.5%
1923	4,663	+0.1%
1934	4,916	+5.4%
1939	5,079	+3.3%
1951	5,677	+11.8%
1961	6,722	+18.4%
1971	7,687	+14.4%
1981	7,666	−0.3%
1991	7,968	+3.9%
2001	9,130	+14.6%
2011	9,469	+3.7%

== Twin towns ==
Laakirchen is twinned with:

- Obertshausen, Germany, since 1972
- Gemona del Friuli, Italy, since 2000
