= Roitham am Traunfall =

- Municipality
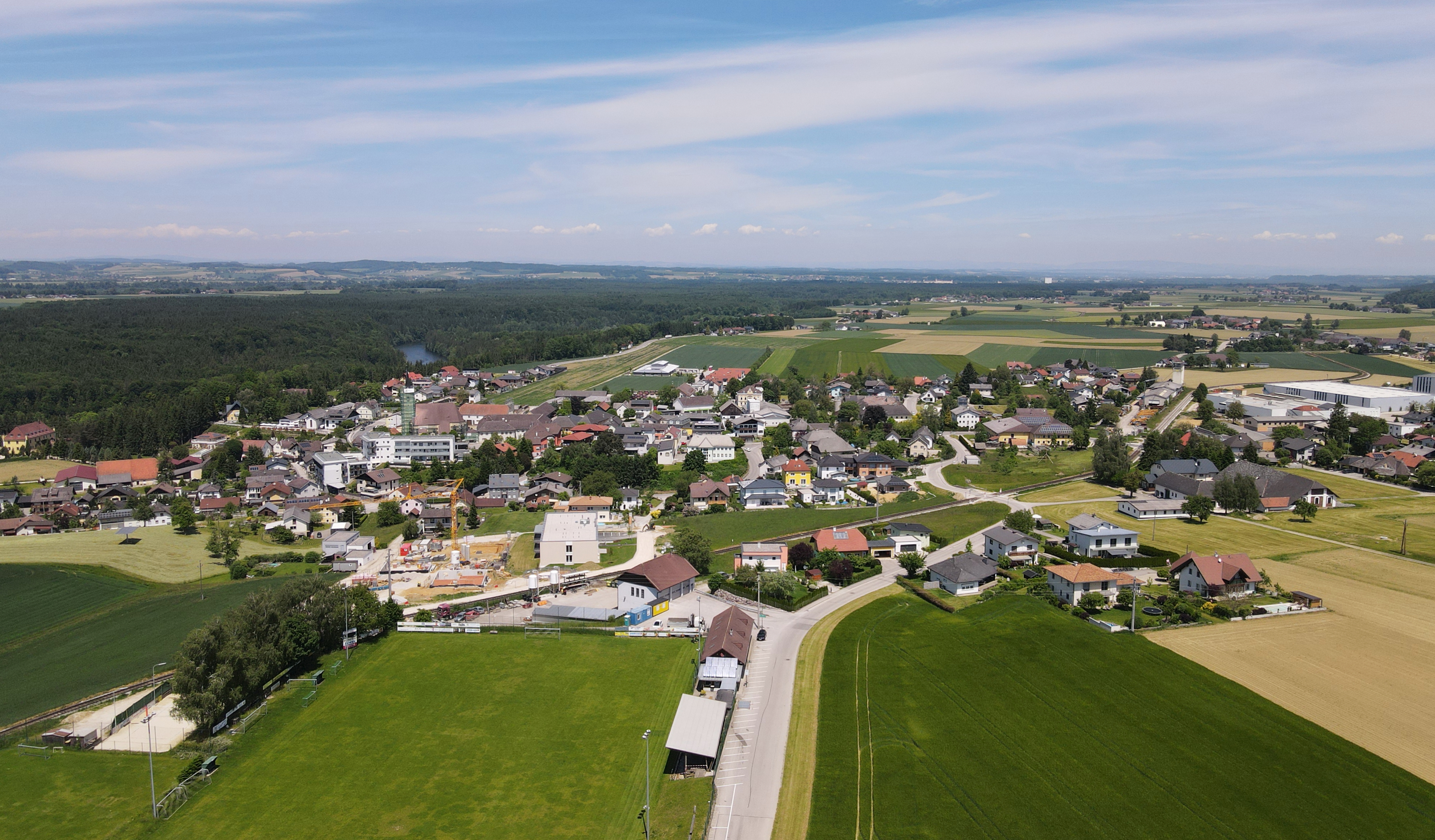
- Aerial view of Roitham

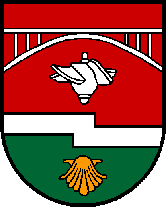
- Coat of arms

- Location within Austria
- Coordinates: 48°01′31″N 13°49′21″E
- Country: Austria
- State: Upper Austria
- District: Gmunden

Government
  - Mayor: Alfred Gruber (SPÖ)

Area
  - Total: 21.05 km^{2} (8.13 sq mi)
- Elevation: 424 m (1,391 ft)

Population (2016-01-01)
  - Total: 2,001
  - Density: 95.06/km^{2} (246.2/sq mi)
- Time zone: UTC+1 (CET)
  - Summer (DST): UTC+2 (CEST)
- Postal code: 4661
- Area code: 07613
- Vehicle registration: GM
- Website: www.roitham.at

Roitham am Traunfall (before December 2016 only Roitham) is a municipality in the district of Gmunden in the Austrian state of Upper Austria.

== Municipal arrangement ==
Roitham am Traunfall is divided into the following boroughs: Watzing, Außerpühret, Außerroh, Oberbuch, Mitterbuch, Palmsdorf and Wangham.

== Politics ==
The results of the last election of the local government in 2015:

- SPÖ: 11 mandates
- ÖVP: 8 mandates
- FPÖ: 6 mandates

Alfred Gruber (SPÖ) is the current mayor of Roitham.
