= Hubertihaus =

Hunting lodge near the Almsee in Austria

Coordinates: 47.7893°N 13.9528°E

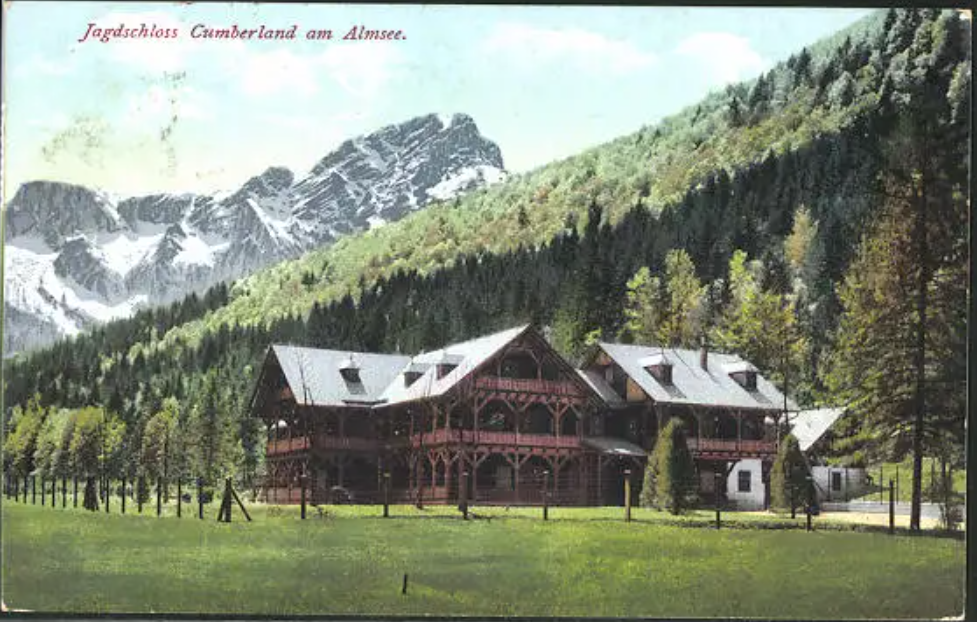
Hubertihaus hunting lodge with the Totes Gebirge mountains in the back

Hubertihaus is a hunting lodge near the Almsee, south of the village of Grünau im Almtal in Austria. It is owned by the House of Hanover and cannot be visited.

== Name ==
The hunting lodge is named after Hubertus, the patron saint of the hunters. In German, Hubertihaus is also referred to as Jagdschloss Auerbach, Jagdschloss Cumberland am Almsee or Jagdschloss am Almsee.

== History ==
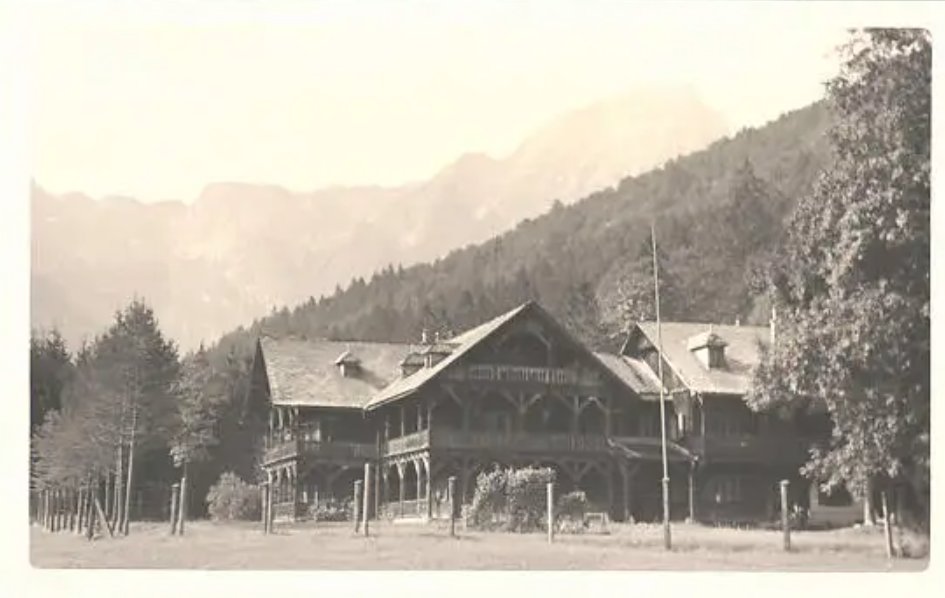
Hubertihaus hunting lodge on a black and white postcard

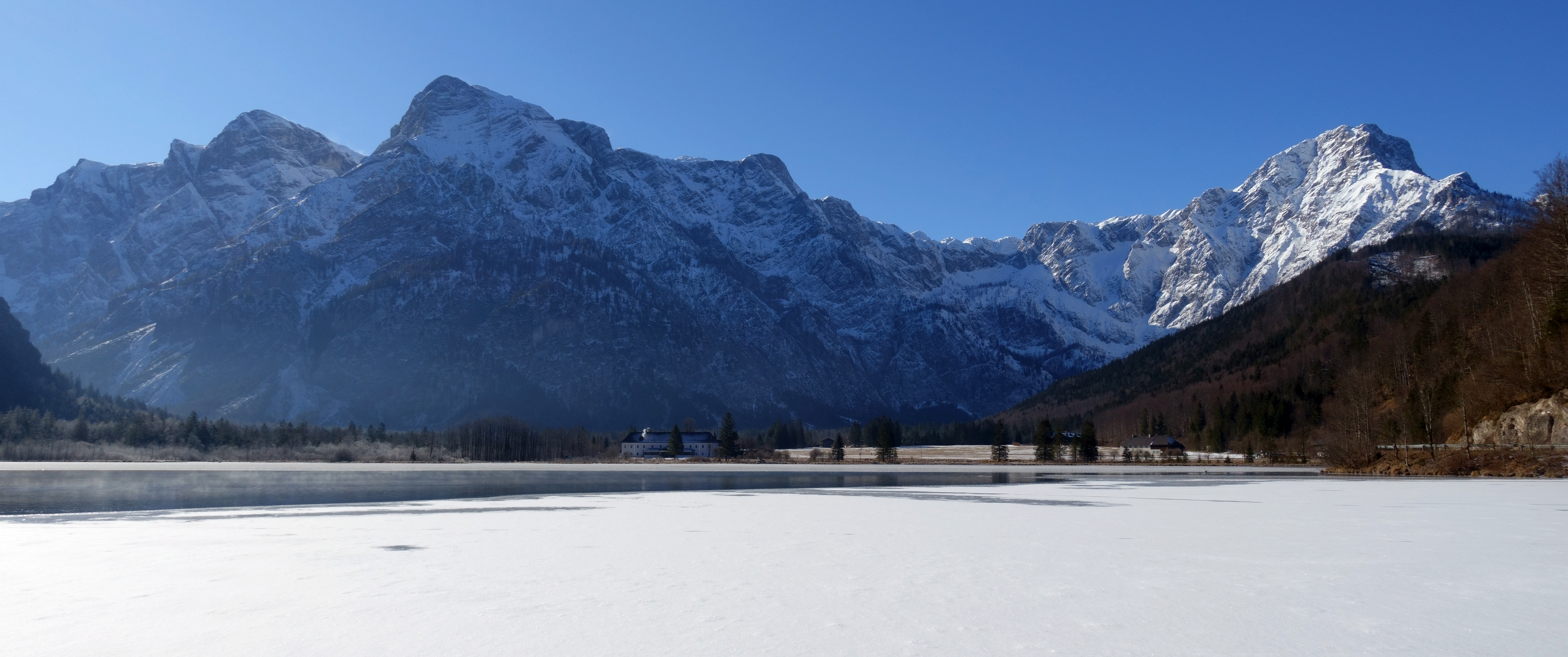
The south bank of the Almsee, with at the back at the edge of the forest, the Hubertihaus hunting lodge

In 1866, when Prussia annexed the Kingdom of Hanover, the royal family went into exile in Austria. In 1868, king George V acquired a villa in Gmunden, Upper Austria, which became his main residence. His son crown prince Ernest Augustus (1845–1923), third Duke of Cumberland and Teviotdale, constructed the neogothic Cumberland Castle as an exile seat in Gmunden in 1882. At the same time, vast forests were acquired near the Almsee. The crown prince built here a hunting lodge, which he named Hubertihaus.

In 1913, the Crown prince's son, Ernest Augustus (1887–1953), Duke of Brunswick, and Victoria Louise of Prussia (1892–1980) spent part of their honeymoon at the Hubertihaus hunting lodge.

In 1927, King Paul of Greece met Frederica of Hanover, his future wife, for the first time at the Hubertihaus lodge.

Prince Ernest August of Hanover (1914–1987) sold Cumberland Castle to the State of Upper Austria in 1979. But the vast forests, a game park, and the Hubertihaus hunting lodge remained in a Liechtenstein-based family foundation, the Duke of Cumberland Foundation.

Up to the current day, the former royal family makes use of the lodge, which cannot be visited.

== Literature ==
- Spitzbart, Ingrid (2003). "König Georg V. von Hannover und seine Familie im Gmundener Exil". In Keindorf, Gudrun; Moritz, Thomas (eds.). Größer noch als Heinrich der Löwe." König Georg V. von Hannover als Bauherr und Identitätsstifter Hrsg. im Auftrag des Vereins Freunde der Burg Plesse e.V. Begleitband zur Ausstellung der Staats- und Universitätsbibliothek Göttingen in der Paulinerkirche (in German). Duderstadt: Mecke Verlag. pp. 67–80. ISBN 3-936617-16-3.
- Schießer, Heinz (2017). Die Welfen am Traunsee – 130 Jahre Schloss Cumberland (in German). Göttingen: MatricMedia Verlag (Heinrich Prinz von Hanover). p. 191. ISBN 978-3-946891-02-4.
