= Gschwandt =

- Municipality
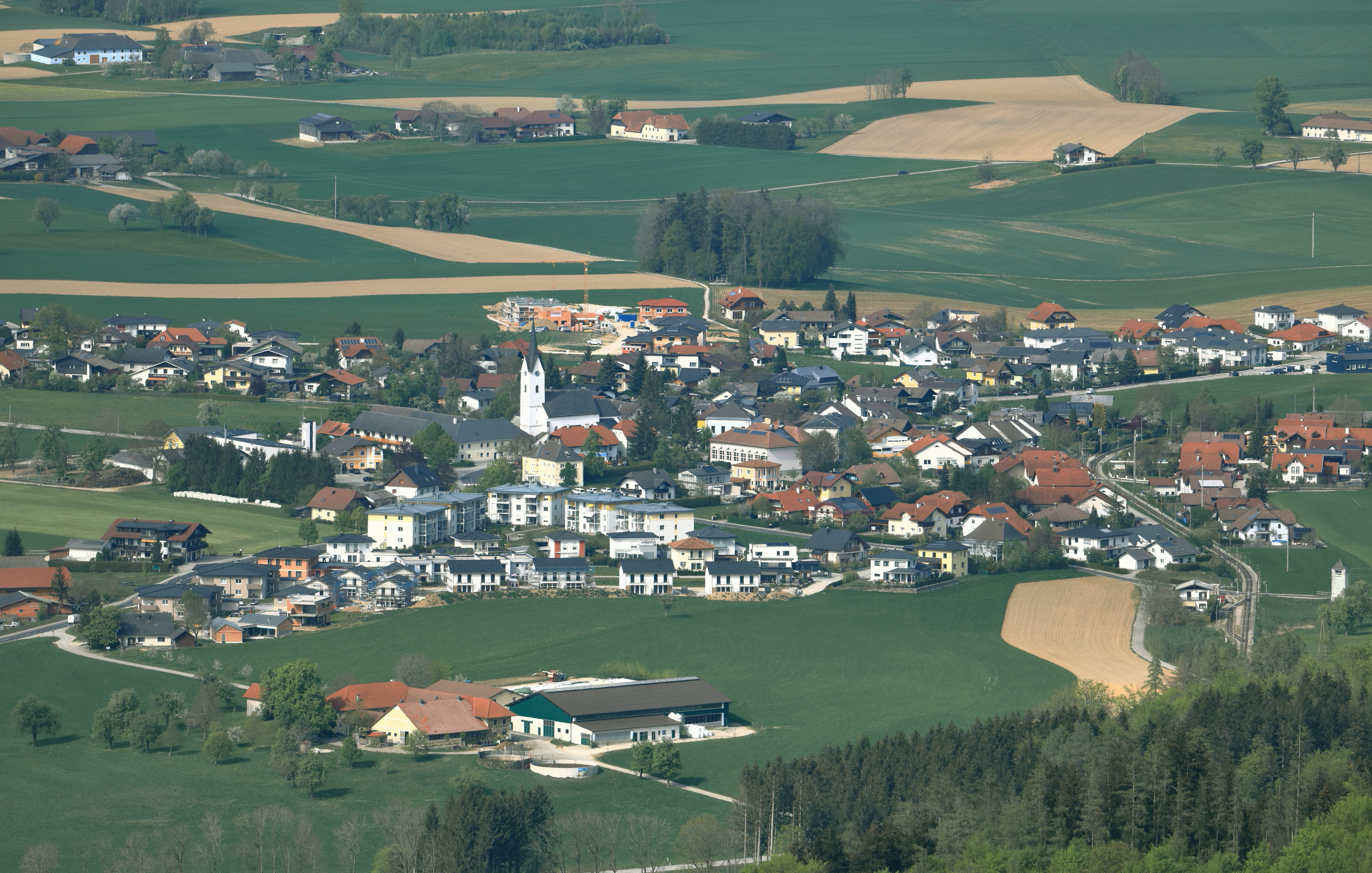
- Gschwandt seen from the southwest

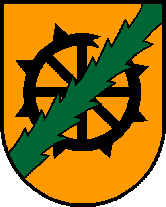
- Coat of arms

- Location within Austria
- Coordinates: 47°56′6″N 13°50′44″E
- Country: Austria
- State: Upper Austria
- District: Gmunden

Government
  - Mayor: Friedrich Steindl (ÖVP)

Area
  - Total: 16.76 km^{2} (6.47 sq mi)
- Elevation: 523 m (1,716 ft)

Population (2018-01-01)
  - Total: 2,750
  - Density: 164/km^{2} (425/sq mi)
- Time zone: UTC+1 (CET)
  - Summer (DST): UTC+2 (CEST)
- Postal code: 4816
- Area code: 07612
- Vehicle registration: GM
- Website: https://www.gschwandt.at/

Gschwandt is a municipality in the district of Gmunden in the Austrian state of Upper Austria.

== Geography ==
Gschwandt lies in a hilly area with a view on the Traunstein. About 18 percent of the municipality is forest, and 71 percent is farmland.
