= Grünau im Almtal =

- Municipality
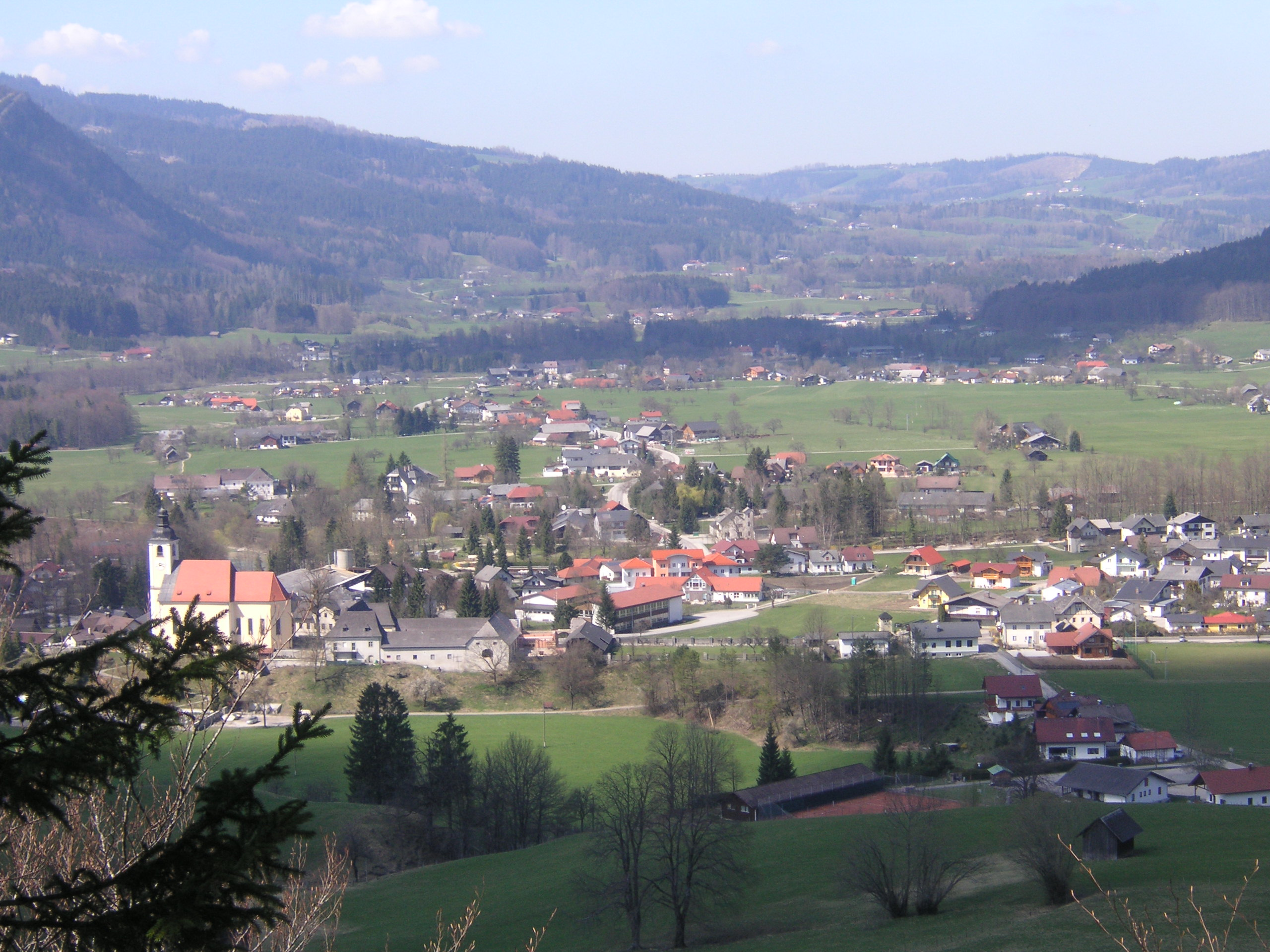

- Coat of arms

- Location within Austria
- Coordinates: 47°51′10″N 13°57′20″E
- Country: Austria
- State: Upper Austria
- District: Gmunden

Government
  - Mayor: Klaus Kramesberger

Area
  - Total: 229.97 km^{2} (88.79 sq mi)
- Elevation: 528 m (1,732 ft)

Population (2018-01-01)
  - Total: 2,064
  - Density: 8.975/km^{2} (23.25/sq mi)
- Time zone: UTC+1 (CET)
  - Summer (DST): UTC+2 (CEST)
- Postal code: 4645
- Area code: 07616
- Vehicle registration: GM
- Website: www.gruenau.at

Grünau im Almtal is a village in the Austrian state of Upper Austria.

== Geography ==
Grünau is surrounded by mountains with a central river (Alm) that runs throughout the valley.

== Sport ==
Grünau also has a passionate connection with their local football team, UFC Drack Bau Grünau. Home games are played at the local football arena, Sportplatz Union Grünau.

== Other ==
Near the Almsee lake, there is Hubertihaus, a hunting lodge of the House of Hanover.
