= Scharnstein =

- Municipality
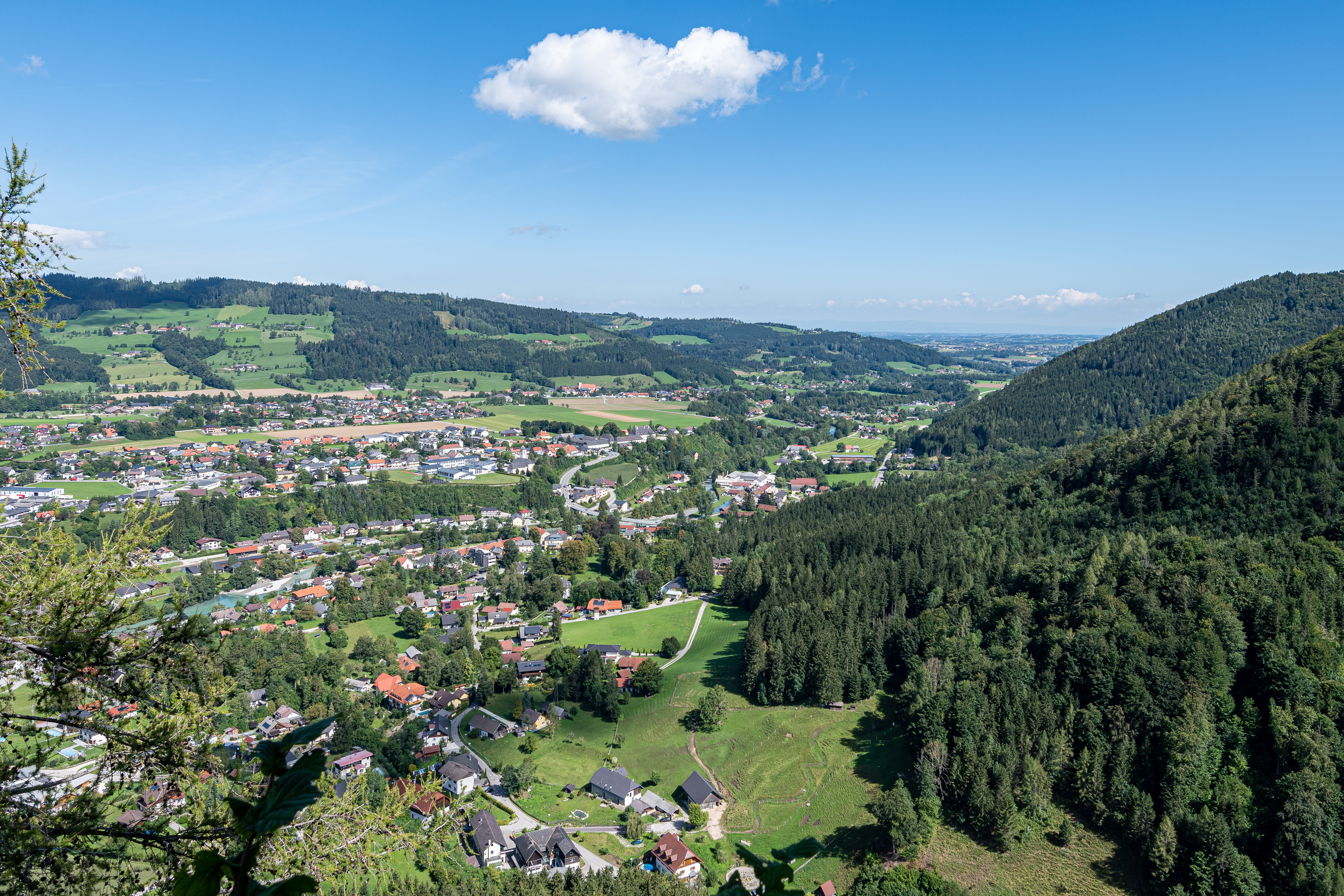
- Scharnstein seen from the Scharnstein Castle ruins

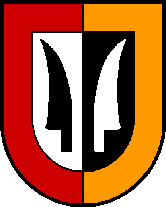
- Coat of arms

- Location within Austria
- Coordinates: 47°54′01″N 13°57′39″E
- Country: Austria
- State: Upper Austria
- District: Gmunden

Government
  - Mayor: Rudolf Raffelsberger (ÖVP)

Area
  - Total: 47.79 km^{2} (18.45 sq mi)
- Elevation: 488 m (1,601 ft)

Population (2016-01-01)
  - Total: 4,780
  - Density: 100/km^{2} (259/sq mi)
- Time zone: UTC+1 (CET)
  - Summer (DST): UTC+2 (CEST)
- Postal code: 4644
- Area code: 07615
- Vehicle registration: GM
- Website: www.scharnstein. ooe.gv.at

Scharnstein is a municipality in the district of Gmunden in the Austrian state of Upper Austria.

== Geography ==
Scharnstein lies in the heart of the Alm valley. About 55 percent of the municipality is forest, and 36 percent is farmland.

== History ==
The municipality bears the coat of arms of its former lords, the Jörger von Tollet family.
