= Kirchham, Austria =

Kirchham
- Municipality
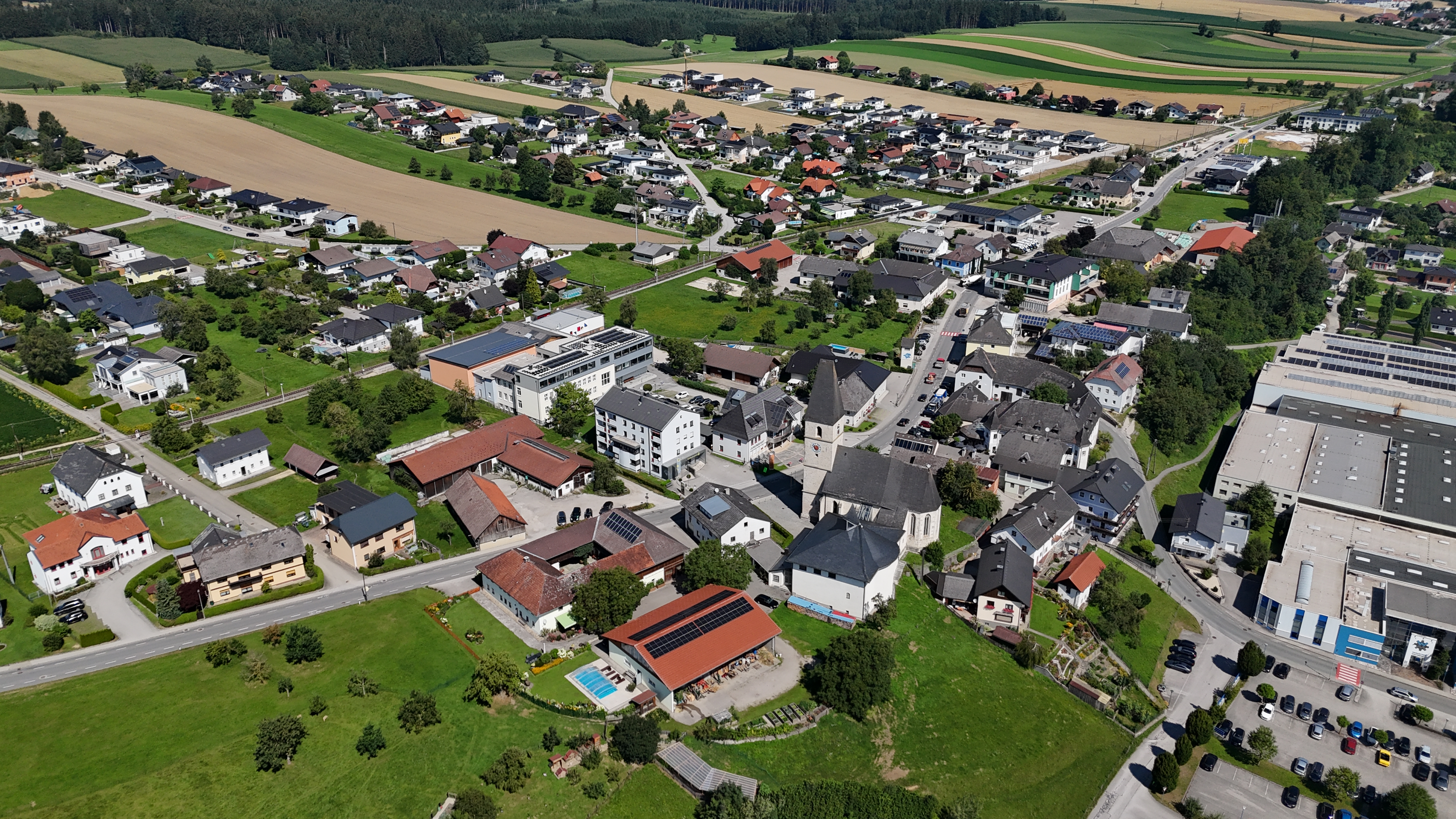
- Aerial view

- Coat of arms

- Location within Austria
- Coordinates: 47°58′16″N 13°54′00″E
- Country: Austria
- State: Upper Austria
- District: Gmunden

Government
  - Mayor: Ingo Dörflinger (ÖVP)

Area
  - Total: 28.41 km^{2} (10.97 sq mi)
- Elevation: 470 m (1,540 ft)

Population (2018-01-01)
  - Total: 2,139
  - Density: 75.29/km^{2} (195.0/sq mi)
- Time zone: UTC+1 (CET)
  - Summer (DST): UTC+2 (CEST)
- Postal code: 4656
- Area code: 07619
- Vehicle registration: GM
- Website: https://www.kirchham.at/

Kirchham (Austrian German pronunciation: [ˈkɪrçˌham]) is a municipality in the district of Gmunden in the Austrian state of Upper Austria.

== Geography ==
Kirchham lies in the Traunviertel at the foot of the last foothills of the pre-Alps at the entrance to the Salzkammergut. About 40 percent of the municipality is forest, and 53 percent is farmland.
