= Burgruine Neu-Montfort =

Castle ruin in Austria

Coordinates: 47.328°N 9.645°E

- Vorarlberg, Austria
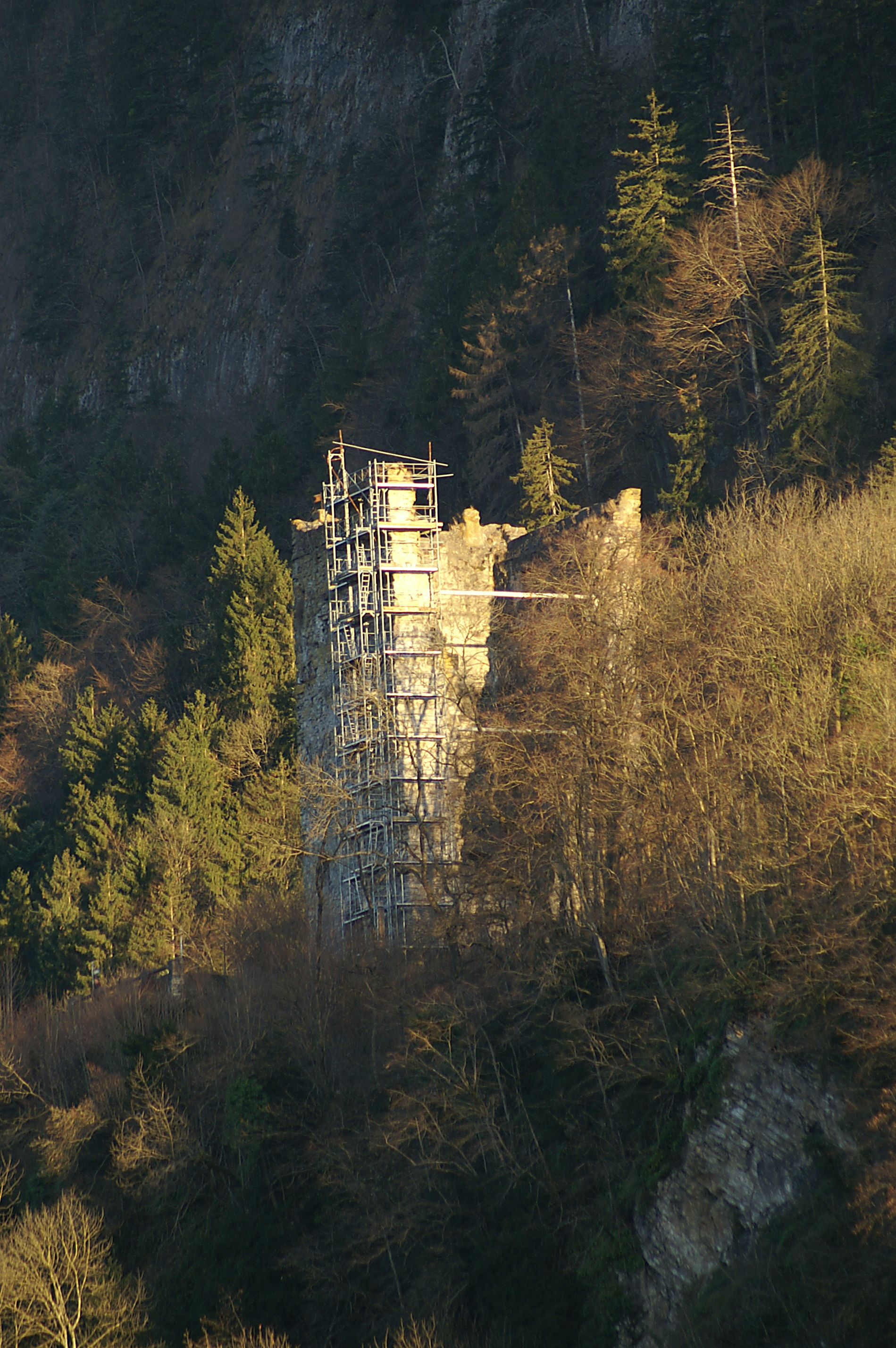

Site information
- Type: Castle

Site history
- Built: 1311 - 1319

Burgruine Neu-Montfort is a castle in Vorarlberg, Austria. Burgruine Neu-Montfort is 513 metres (1,683 ft) above sea level.

== See also ==
- List of castles in Austria
