= Burgruine Treffen =

Castle ruin in Austria

- Carinthia, Austria
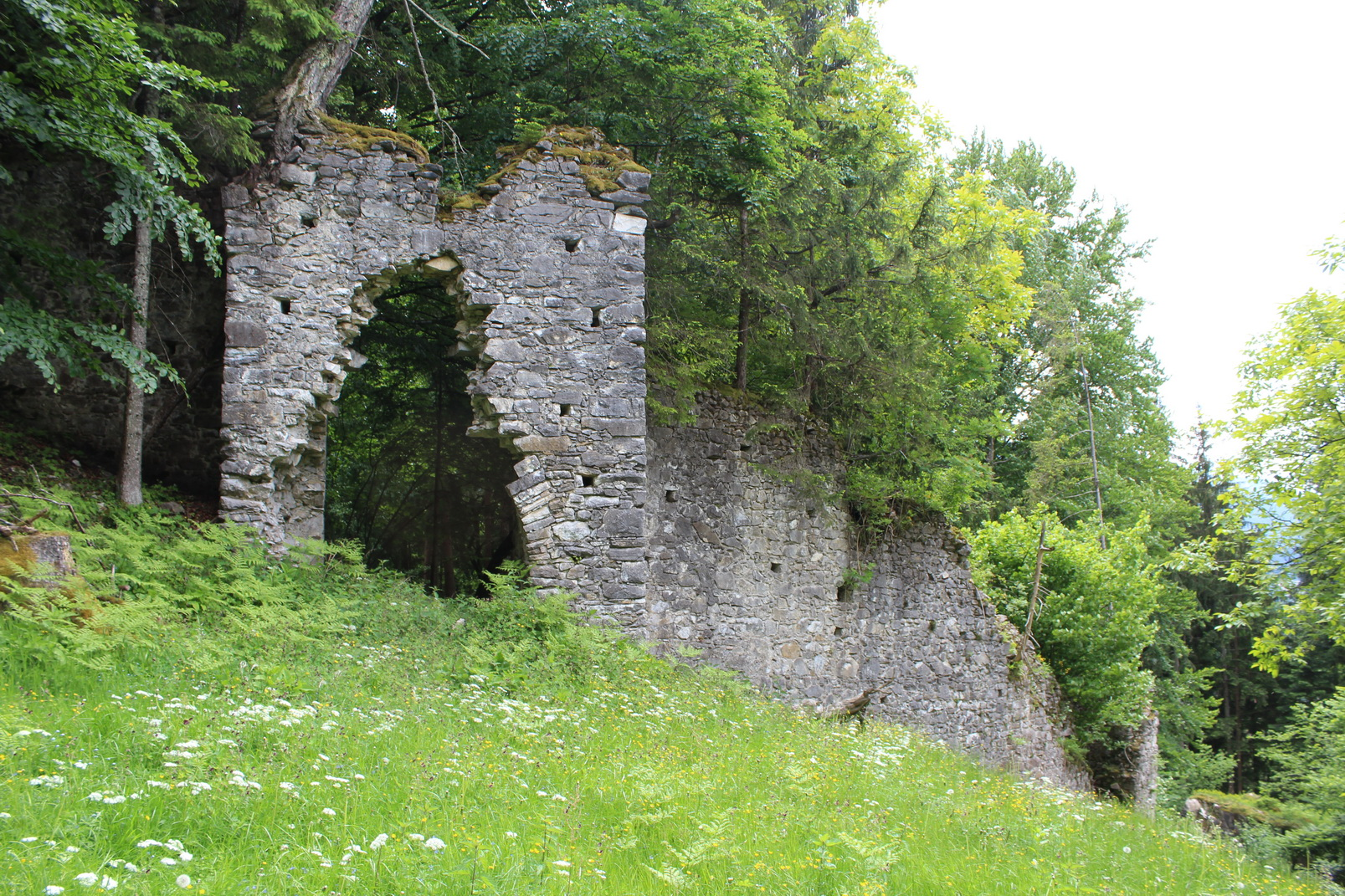

Site information
- Type: Castle

Location
- Coordinates: 46°41′10″N 13°50′33″E

Site history
- Built: Around 1065

Burgruine Treffen is a castle in Carinthia, Austria.

== See also ==
- List of castles in Austria
