= Burgruine Wolkenstein =

Castle ruin in Styria, Austria

Coordinates: 47.557°N 14.152°E

- Styria, Austria
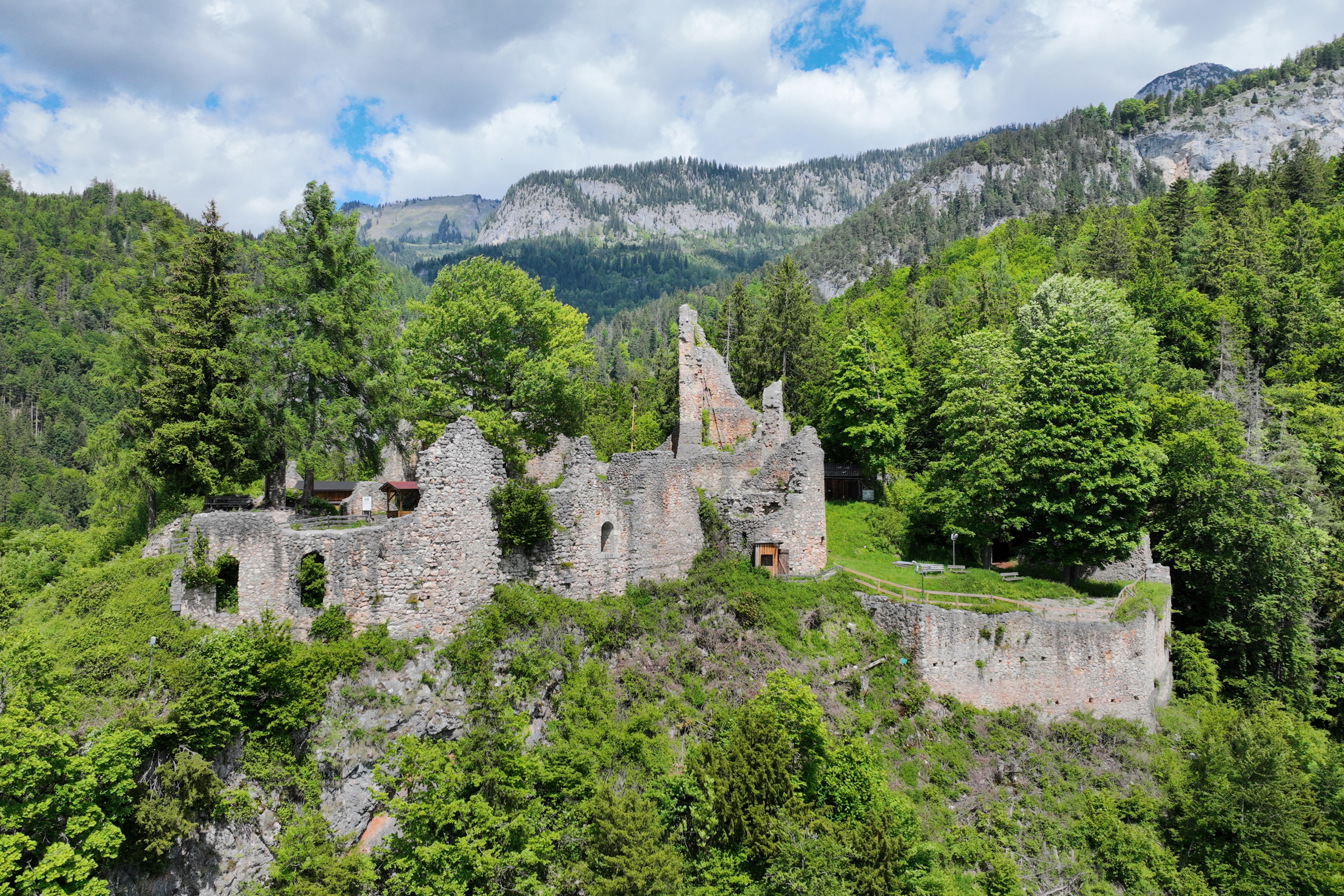
- Southeast view of the Wolkenstein castle ruins

Site information
- Type: Hilltop castle

Site history
- Built: 8th Century

Burgruine Wolkenstein is a high medieval castle in Styria, Austria. Burgruine Wolkenstein is 450 metres (1,480 ft) above sea level. Though it exists only a wall today, the castle used to by the second largest fortified castle in Styria.

== See also ==
- List of castles in Austria
