= Burgruine Reinegg =

Castle in Carinthia, Austria

- Carinthia, Austria
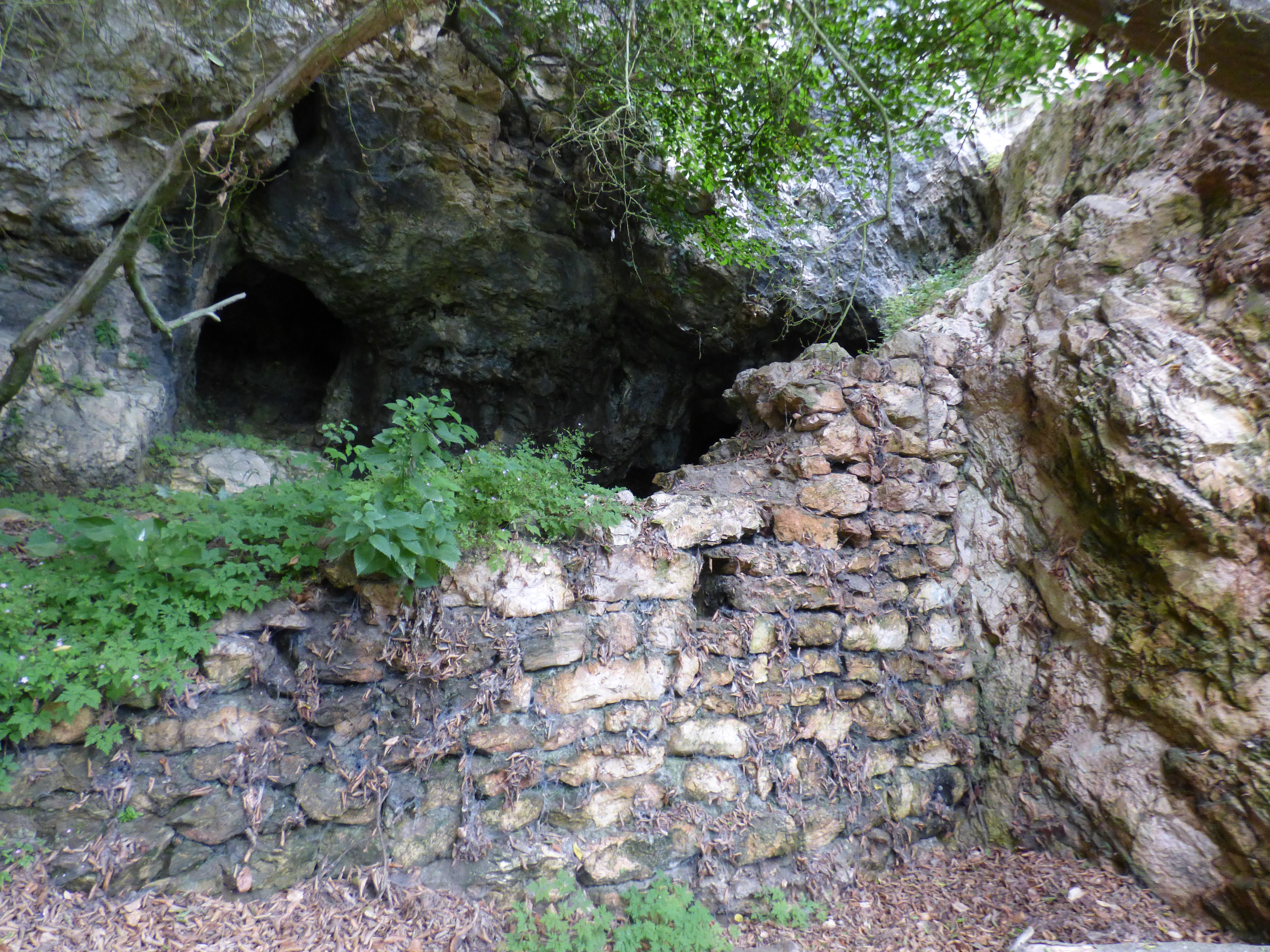

Site information
- Type: Castle

Location
- Coordinates: 46°43′53.5″N 14°31′59.7″E

Burgruine Reinegg is a castle ruin in Carinthia, Austria.

== See also ==
- List of castles in Austria
