= Burgruine Ras =

Castle ruin in Austria

- Carinthia, Austria
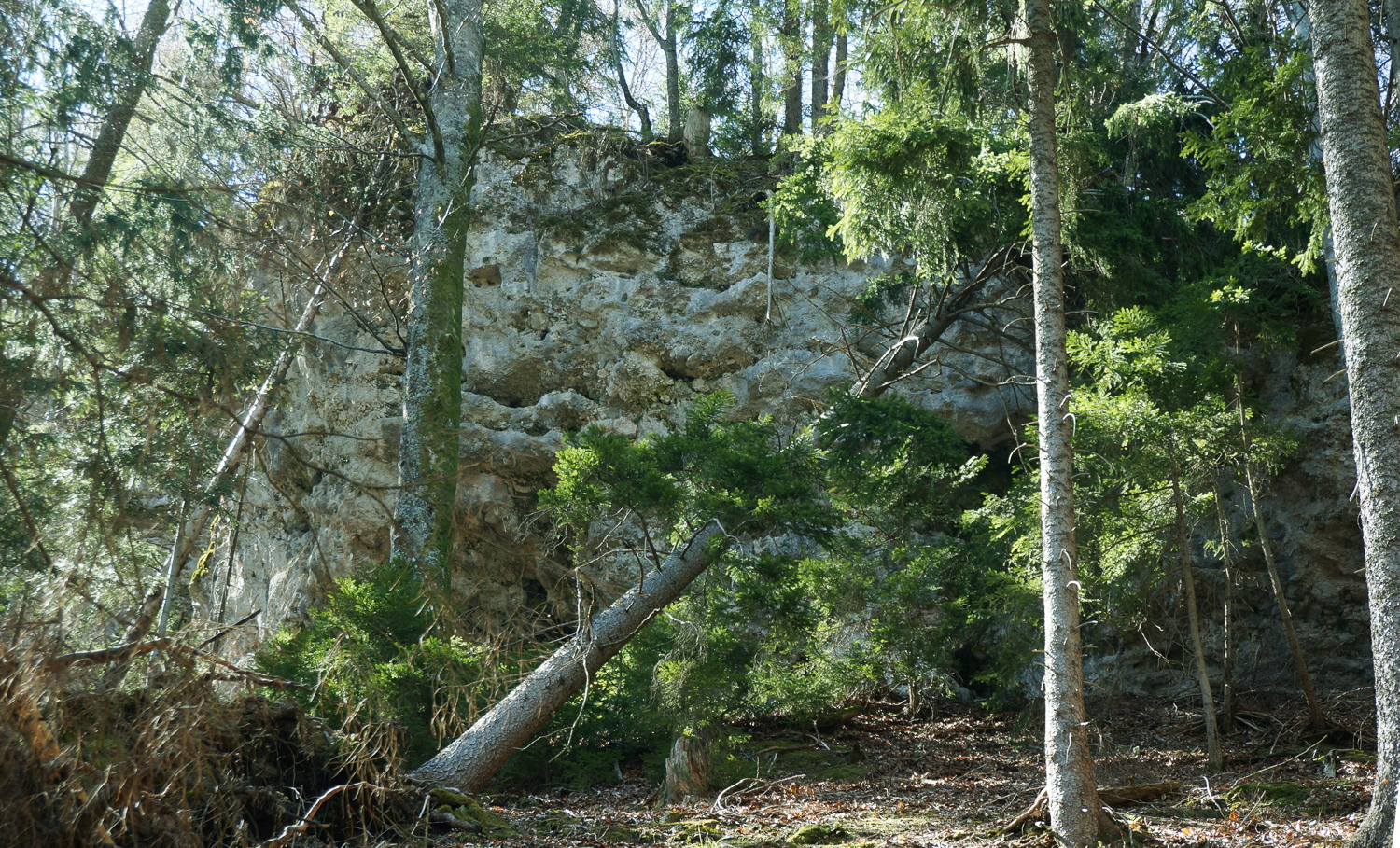

Site information
- Type: Castle
- Condition: Ruins

Location
- Coordinates: 46°32′44″N 14°02′27″E

Site history
- Built: First documented 1171

Burgruine Ras is a ruined castle in Carinthia, Austria. It was first documented in 1171. Only the remnants of an encompassing wall and two round towers are present today.

== See also ==
- List of castles in Austria
