= Schloss Walpersdorf =

Building in Inzersdorf-Getzersdorf, Austria

- Lower Austria, Austria
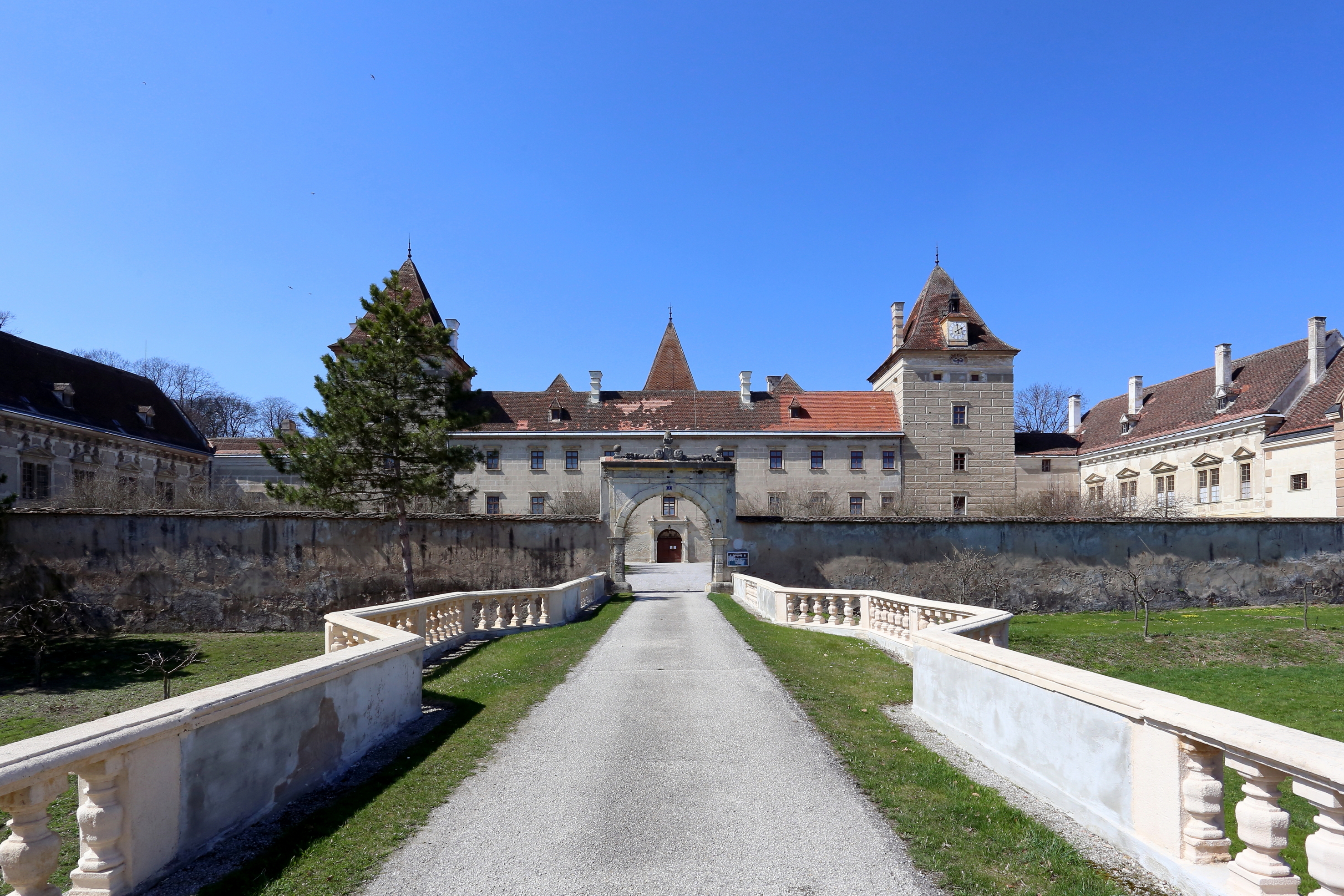
- www.schloss-walpersdorf.net

Site information
- Type: Castle

Location
- Coordinates: 48°18′47″N 15°40′42″E

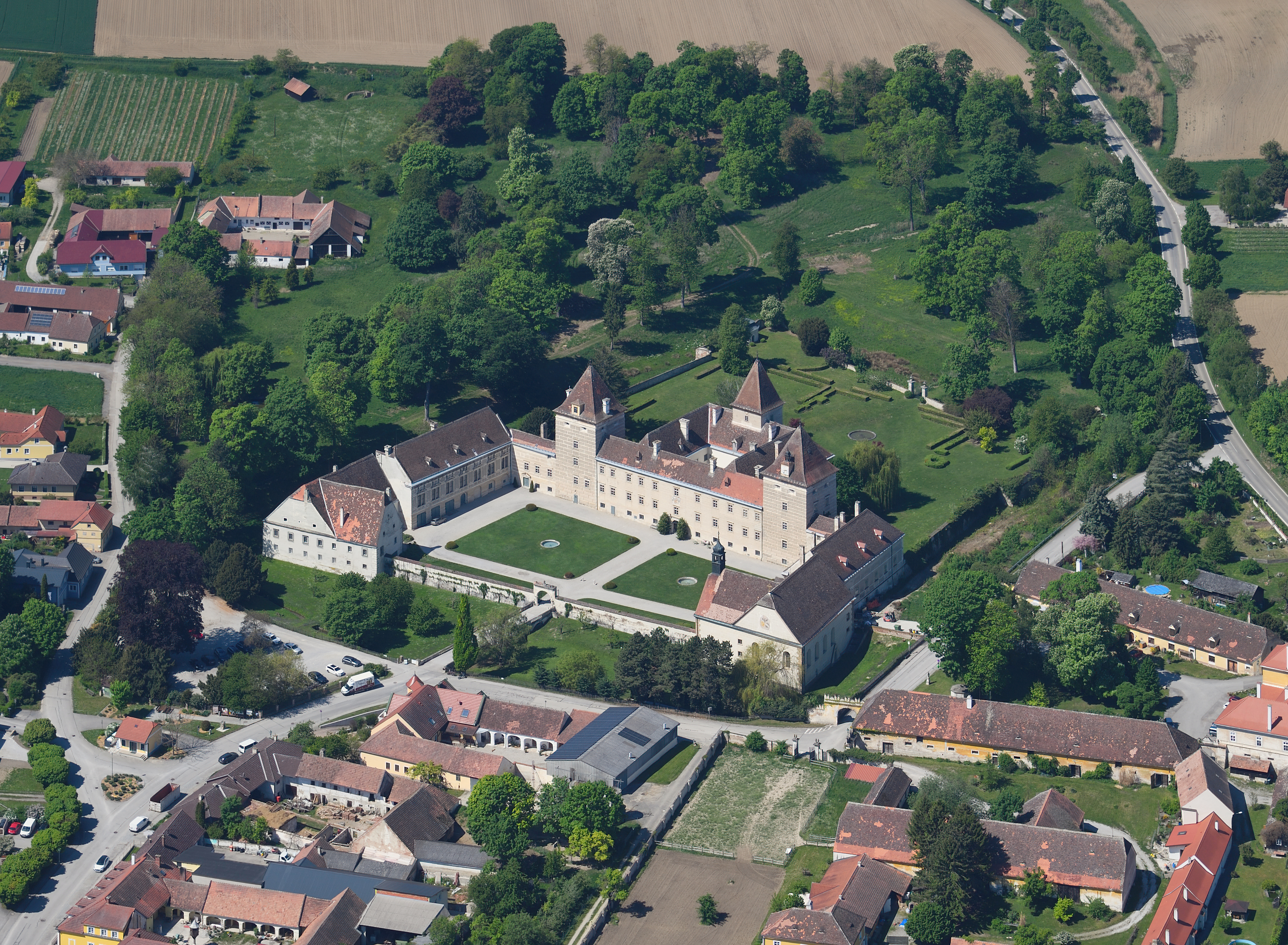
Aerial view of Schloss Walpersdorf and its park

Schloss Walpersdorf is a castle in Lower Austria, Austria. Schloss Walpersdorf is 249 metres (817 ft) above sea level.

== See also ==
- List of castles in Austria
