= Ruine Neudeck =

Castle ruin in Austria

- Styria, Austria

Site information
- Type: Castle

Location
- Coordinates: 47°02′01″N 14°25′20″E

Ruine Neudeck is a castle in Styria, Austria. Roman gravestones have been discovered there.

== See also ==
- List of castles in Austria
