= Ruine Raabeck =

Castle in Styria, Austria

- Styria, Austria

Site information
- Type: Castle

Location
- Coordinates: 47.1909°N 15.5853°E

Ruine Raabeck is the remains of a castle in Styria, Austria.

== See also ==
- List of castles in Austria
