= Burgruine Grafenstein =

Castle ruins in Austria

Coordinates: 46°36′07″N 14°27′58″E

- Carinthia, Austria
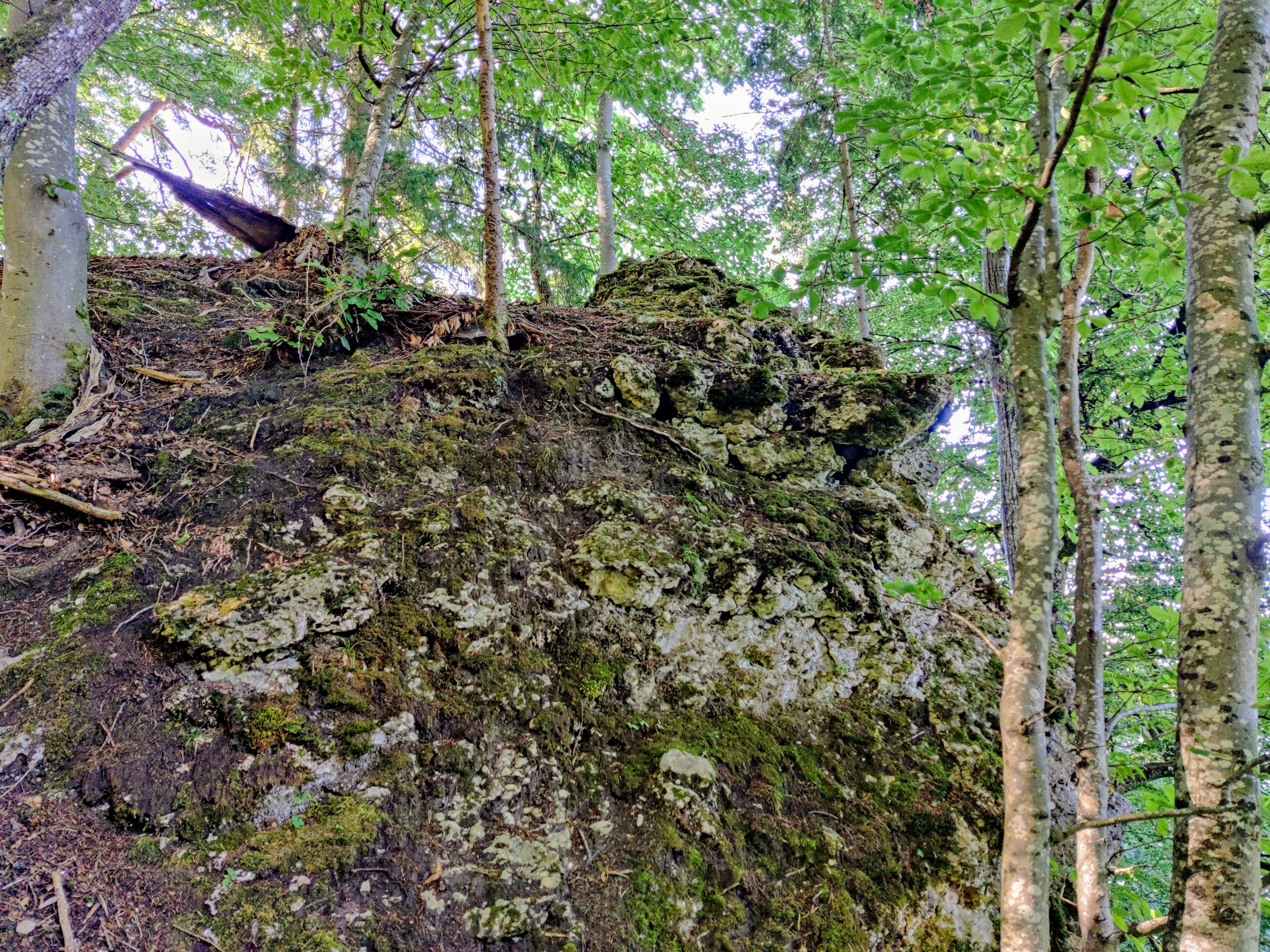
- Ruins of Burgruine Grafenstein in 2021

Site information
- Type: Hilltop castle

Site history
- Built: Around 1100 to 1150

Burgruine Grafenstein is a ruinous medieval castle in Carinthia, Austria, built in the 12th century.

== See also ==
- List of castles in Austria
