= Burgruine Dobra =

Castle ruin in Lower Austria, Austria

Coordinates: 48°35′30″N 15°23′34″E

- Lower Austria, Austria
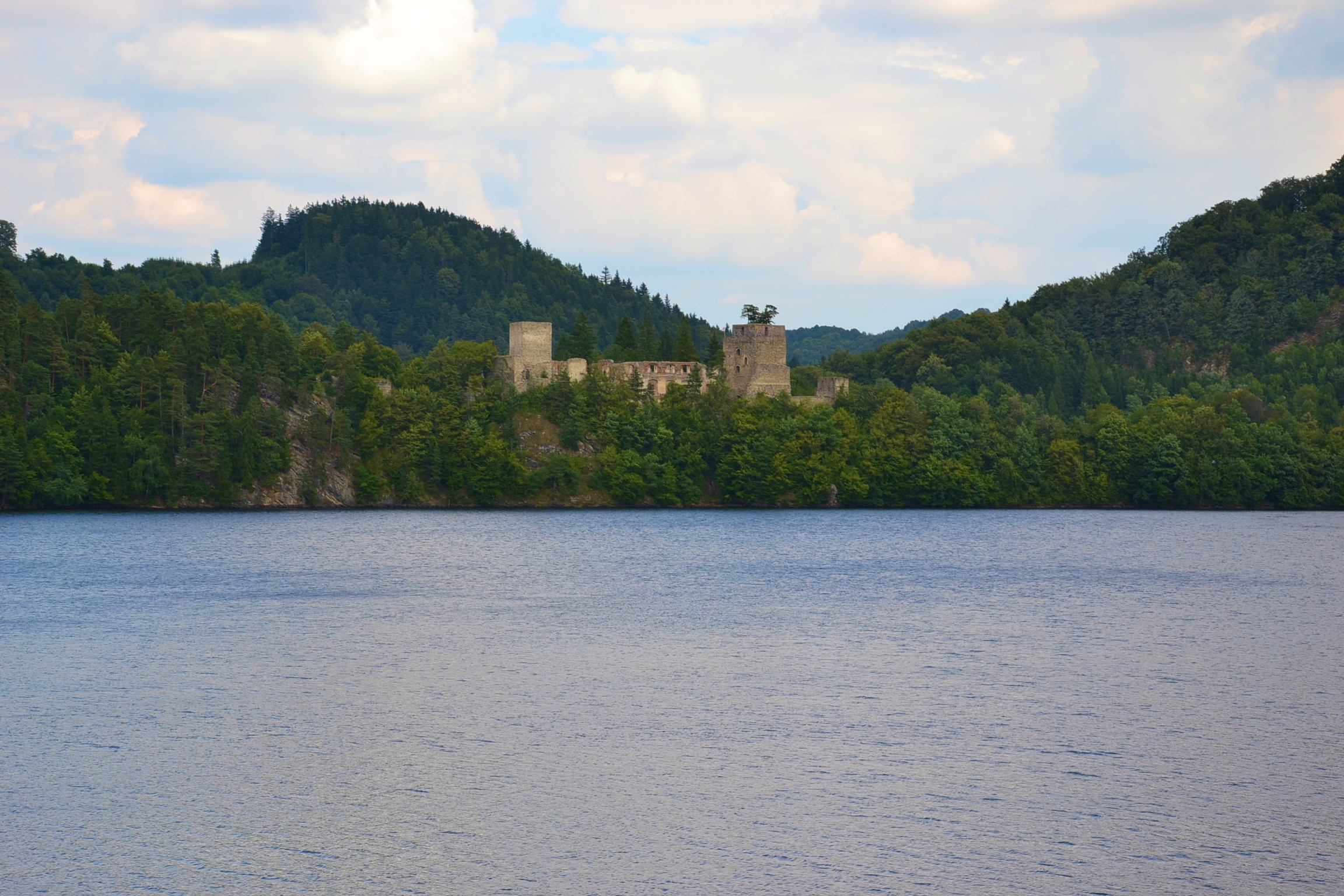

Site history
- Built: before 1278

Burgruine Dobra is a castle in Lower Austria, Austria. Burgruine Dobra is 475 metres (1,558 ft) above sea level.

== See also ==
- List of castles in Austria
