= Burg Alt-Teuffenbach =

Castle in Styria, Austria

- Styria, Austria
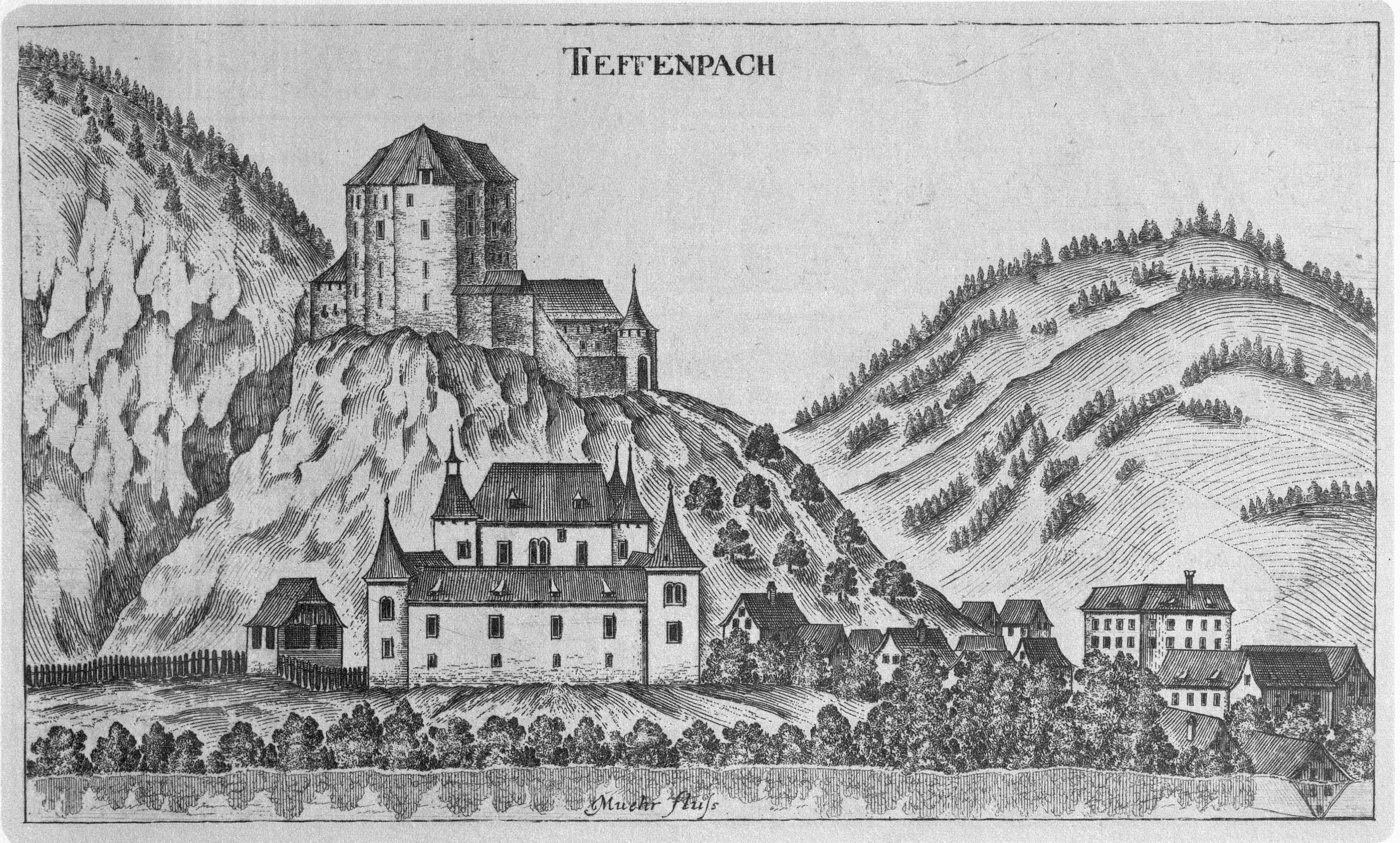
- Burg Alt-Teuffenbach in 1681

Site information
- Type: Hilltop castle

Site history
- Built: 1150

Burg Alt-Teuffenbach is a castle in Styria, Austria. It was built in the first half of the 12th century, likely by the Teuffenbach family from which it takes its name. By 1815, it was ruinous.

== See also ==
- List of castles in Austria
