= Burgruine Sternberg =

Castle ruin in Austria

Coordinates: 46.626°N 13.986°E

- Carinthia, Austria

Site information
- Type: Castle

Burgruine Sternberg is a castle in Carinthia, Austria.

== See also ==
- List of castles in Austria
