= Burg Bideneck =

Castle in Austria

Coordinates: 47°07′16″N 10°38′06″E

- Tyrol, Austria
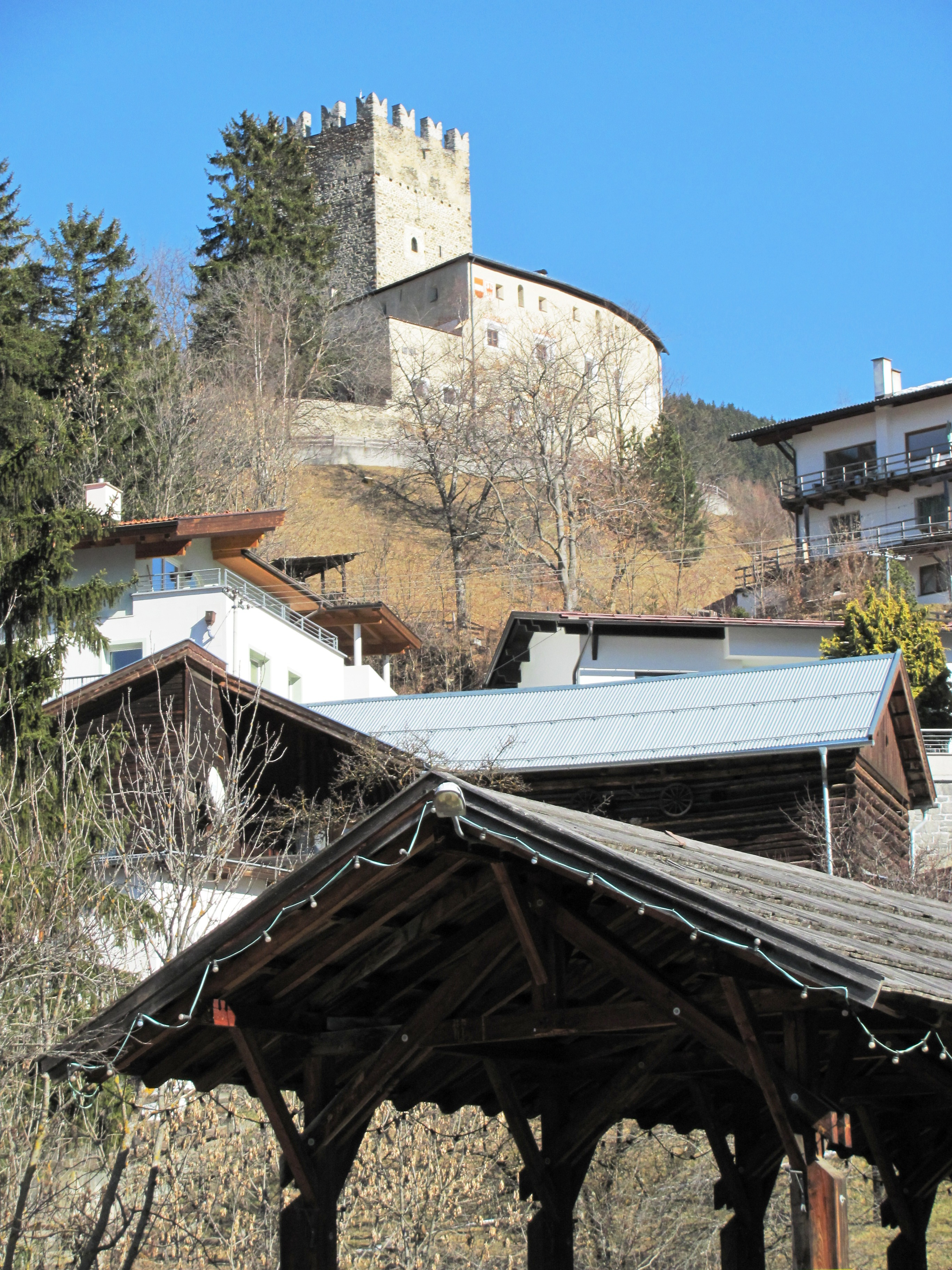

Site information
- Type: Castle

Burg Bideneck is a castle in Tyrol, Austria. Burg Bideneck is 198 metres (650 ft) above sea level.

Bidenegg Castle, ^{[1]} also known as Biedenegg, Bideneck, Biedeneck and as Burg, is a castle in the municipality of Fließ in western Austria .

The castle complex was first mentioned in a document in 1339. Relatively unprotected for a castle, it was accessible from a moderately rising slope. Striking are the twelve 1.5 meter high dovetail battlements that crown the keep and were brought into this form only recently.

In 1546 Hans Trautson acquired the castle. The complex was rebuilt in the 16th century and has largely retained its appearance to this day. Later, the barons of Pach zu Hansenheim acquired the castle. They later also ran a cafe. The castle has been owned by the Pöll family since 1994.

Holiday apartments are currently set up in the castle, which is why it is not open to visitors. ^{[2]}

== See also ==
- List of castles in Austria
