= Burgruine Lavant =

Castle ruins in Austria

Coordinates: 46.796°N 12.836°E

- Carinthia, Austria

Site information
- Type: Castle

Burgruine Lavant is a castle in Carinthia, Austria.

== See also ==
- List of castles in Austria
