= Burgruine Sonegg =

Castle ruin in Austria

- Carinthia, Austria
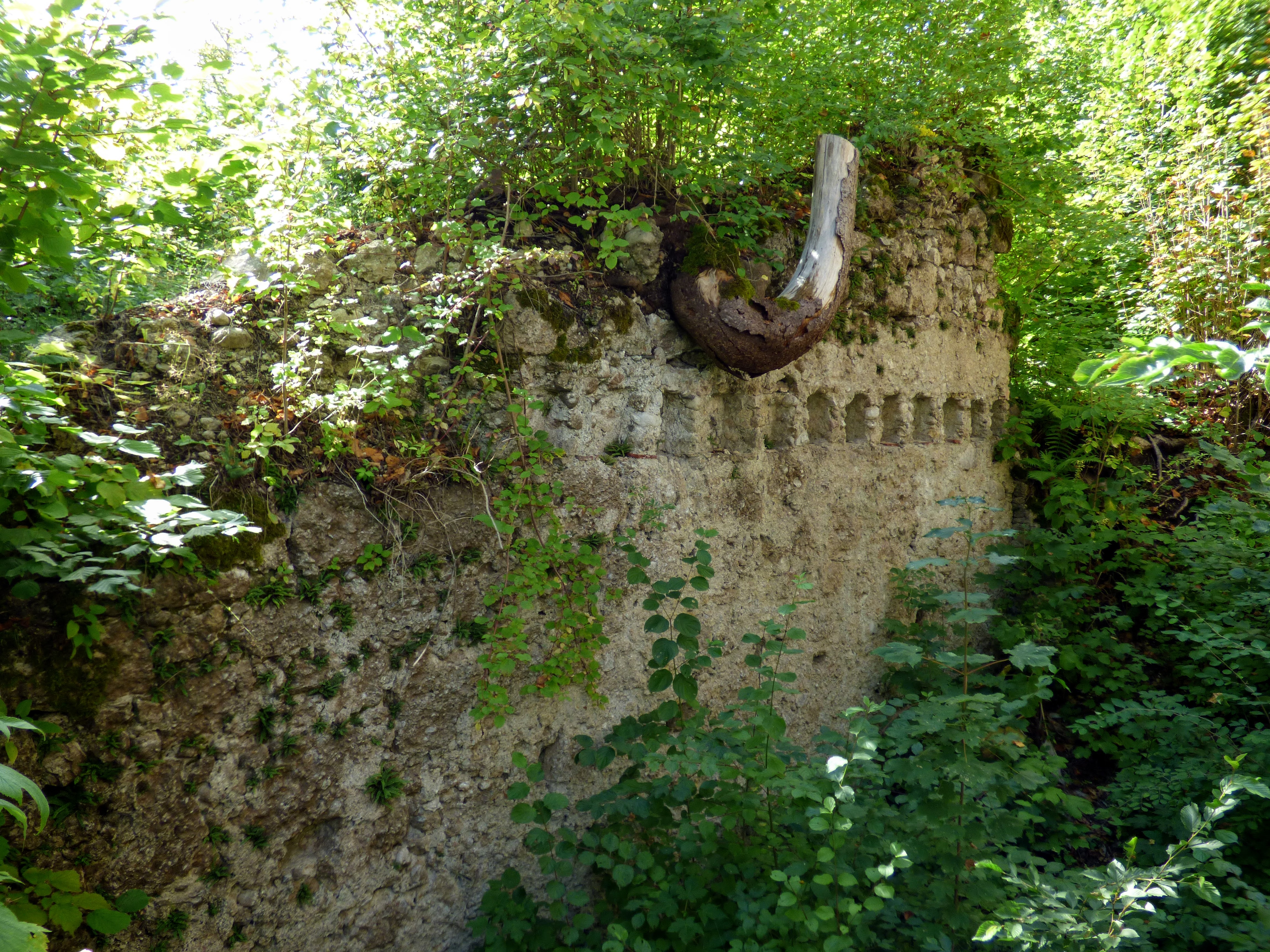

Site information
- Type: Castle

Location
- Coordinates: 46.5629°N 14.6421°E

Burgruine Sonegg is a castle in Carinthia, Austria.

== See also ==
- List of castles in Austria
