= Saalegg Castle =

Castle ruin in Austria

Coordinates: 47.5260°N 12.7356°E

- Burgruine Saalegg
- Salzburg, Austria
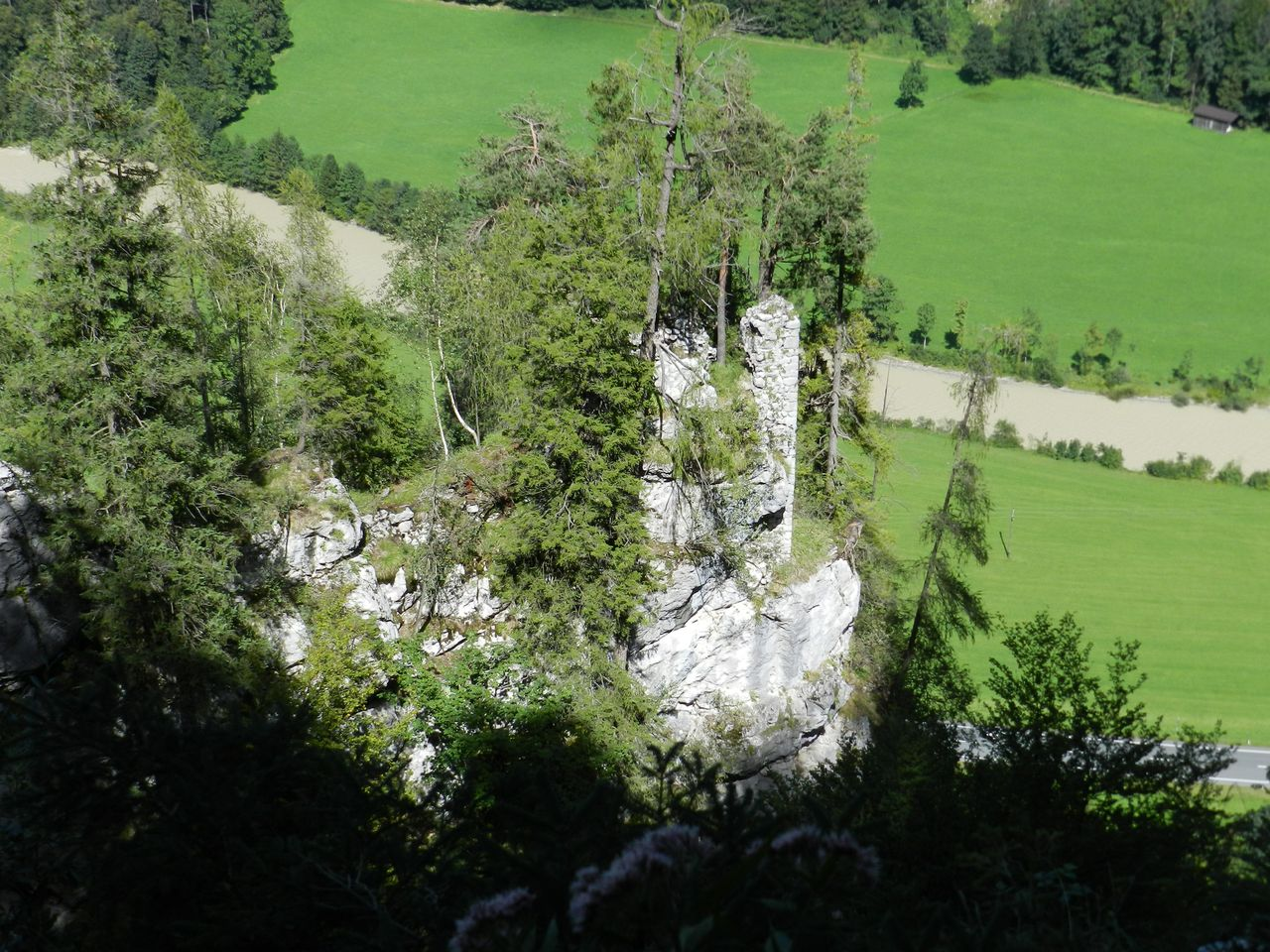

Site information
- Type: Castle

Saalegg Castle (German: Burg Saalegg) is a ruined castle in the state of Salzburg, Austria.

== See also ==
- List of castles in Austria
