= Burg Grub =

Castle in Lower Austria, Austria

Coordinates: 48°42′37″N 15°30′25″E

- Lower Austria, Austria
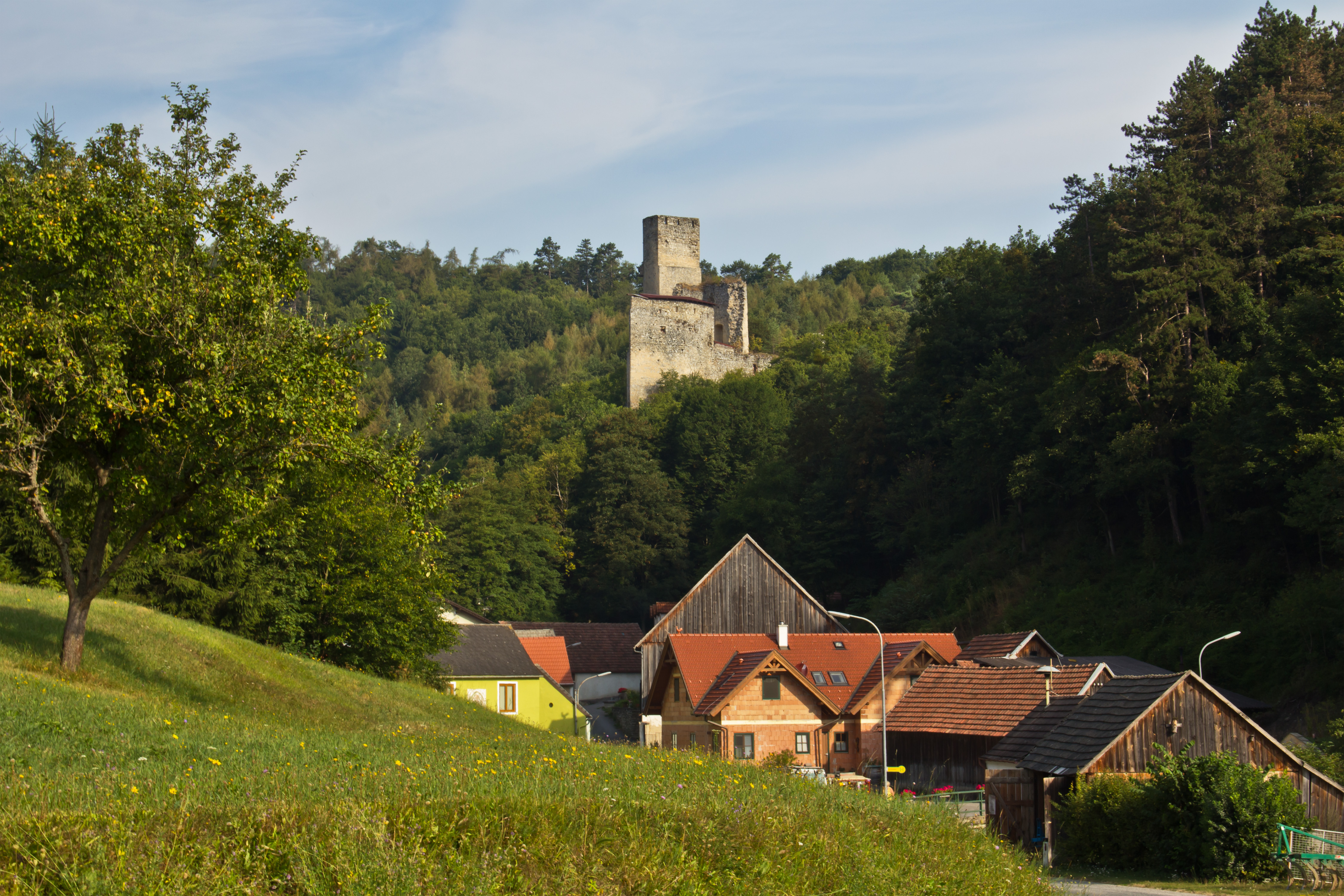

Site history
- Built: 11th century

Burg Grub is a castle in Lower Austria, Austria. Burg Grub is 467 metres (1,532 ft) above sea level.

== See also ==
- List of castles in Austria
