= Burgruine Grünburg =

Castle ruins in Austria

- Carinthia, Austria
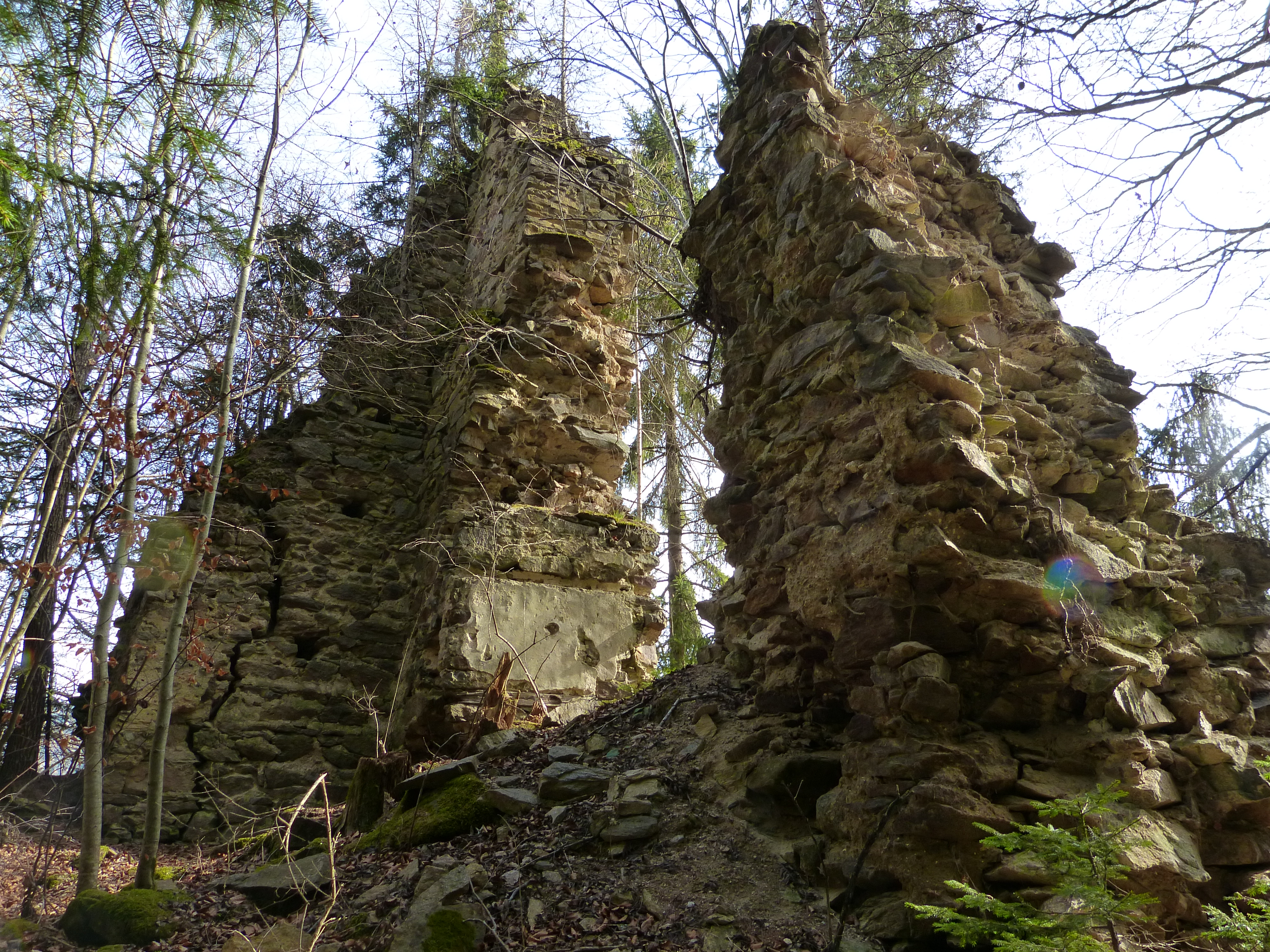

Site information
- Type: Castle

Location
- Coordinates: 46°51′23″N 14°34′44.6″E

Burgruine Grünburg is a castle in Carinthia, Austria.

== See also ==
- List of castles in Austria
