= Burgruine Reifnitz =

Castle in Austria

- Carinthia, Austria
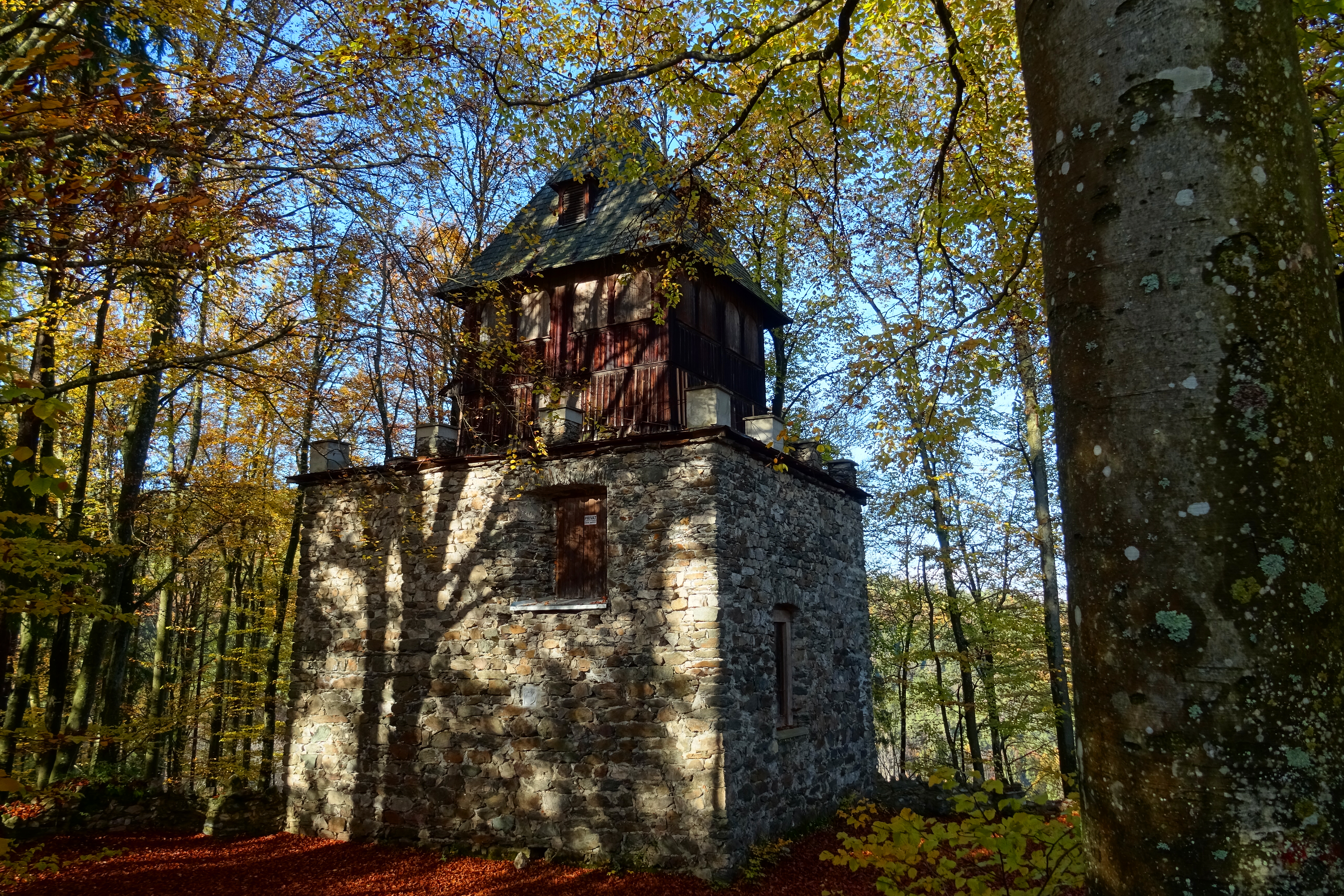

Site information
- Type: Castle

Location
- Coordinates: 46°36′1″N 14°9′48″E

Burgruine Reifnitz is a castle in Carinthia, Austria.

== See also ==
- List of castles in Austria
