= Burgruine Wartenfels =

Castle ruin in Austria

Coordinates: 47°48′55″N 13°18′21″E

- Salzburg, Austria
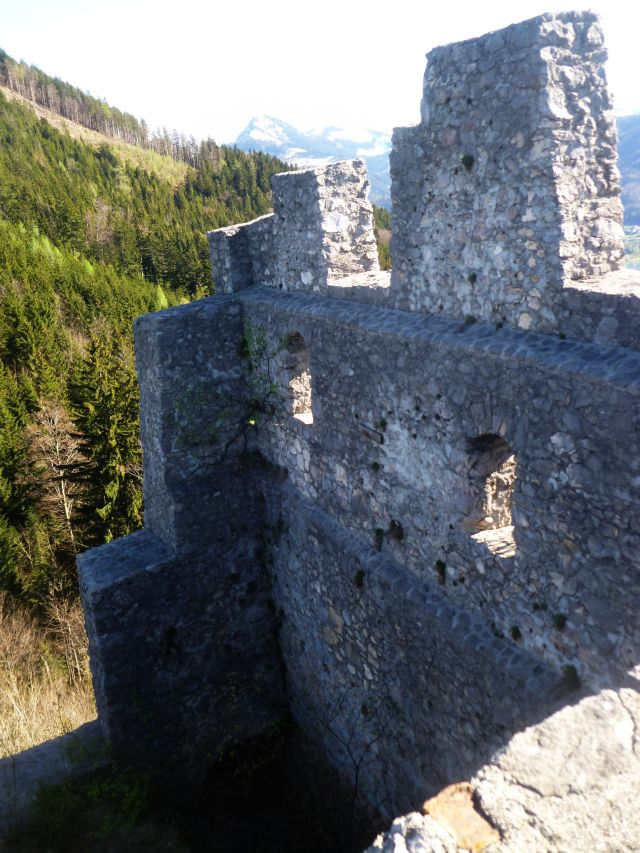
- Ruins of Burgruine Wartenfels in 2012

Site information
- Type: Hill castle

Site history
- Built: 1259
- Built by: Konrad von Steinkirchen and his son-in-law Konrad von Wartenfels

Wartenfels Castle (German: Burgruine Wartenfels) is a ruinous castle in Salzburg, Austria, built in 1259 by Konrad von Kahlham, who thereafter was known as Konrad von Wartenfels.

== See also ==
- List of castles in Austria
