= List of castles in Austria =

This page is a list of castles and castle ruins in Austria, arranged by state. A Burgruine is a ruined castle, a “castle ruin”.

== Burgenland ==
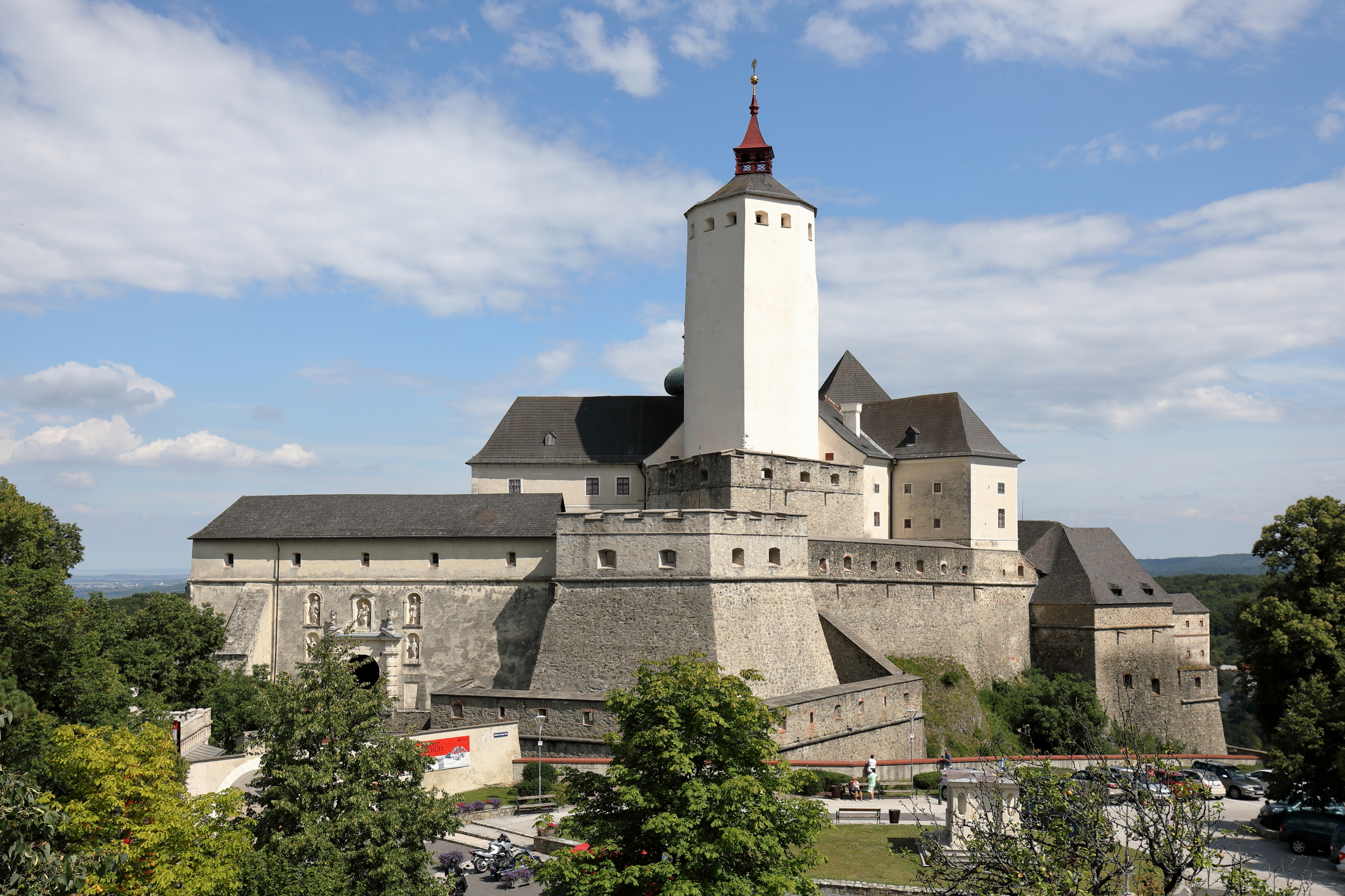
Forchtenstein Castle

- Burg Bernstein
- Burg Forchtenstein
- Burg Güssing
- Burgruine Landsee
- Burg Lockenhaus
- Schloss Rechnitz
- Burg Schlaining

== Carinthia ==
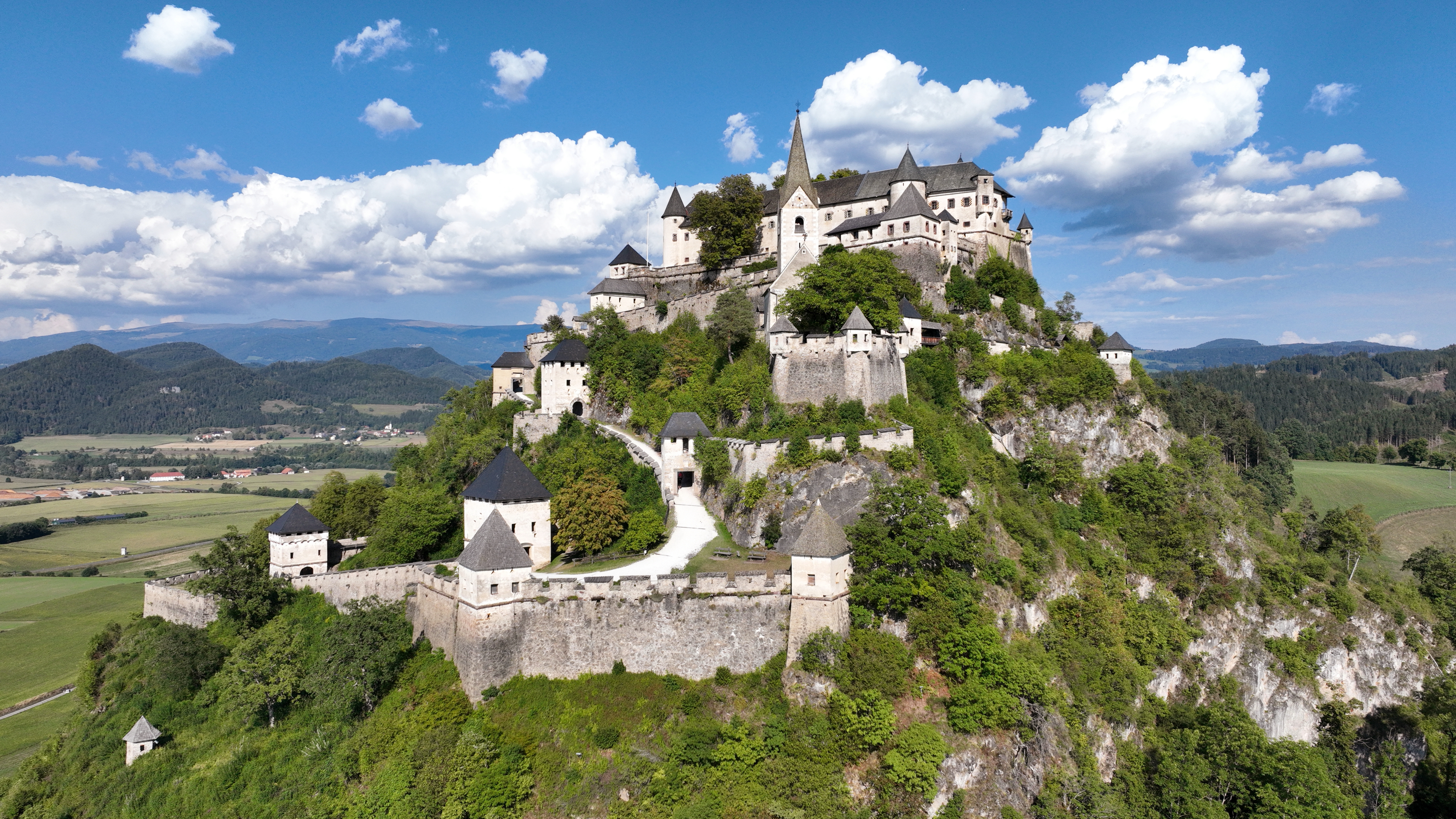
Hochosterwitz Castle

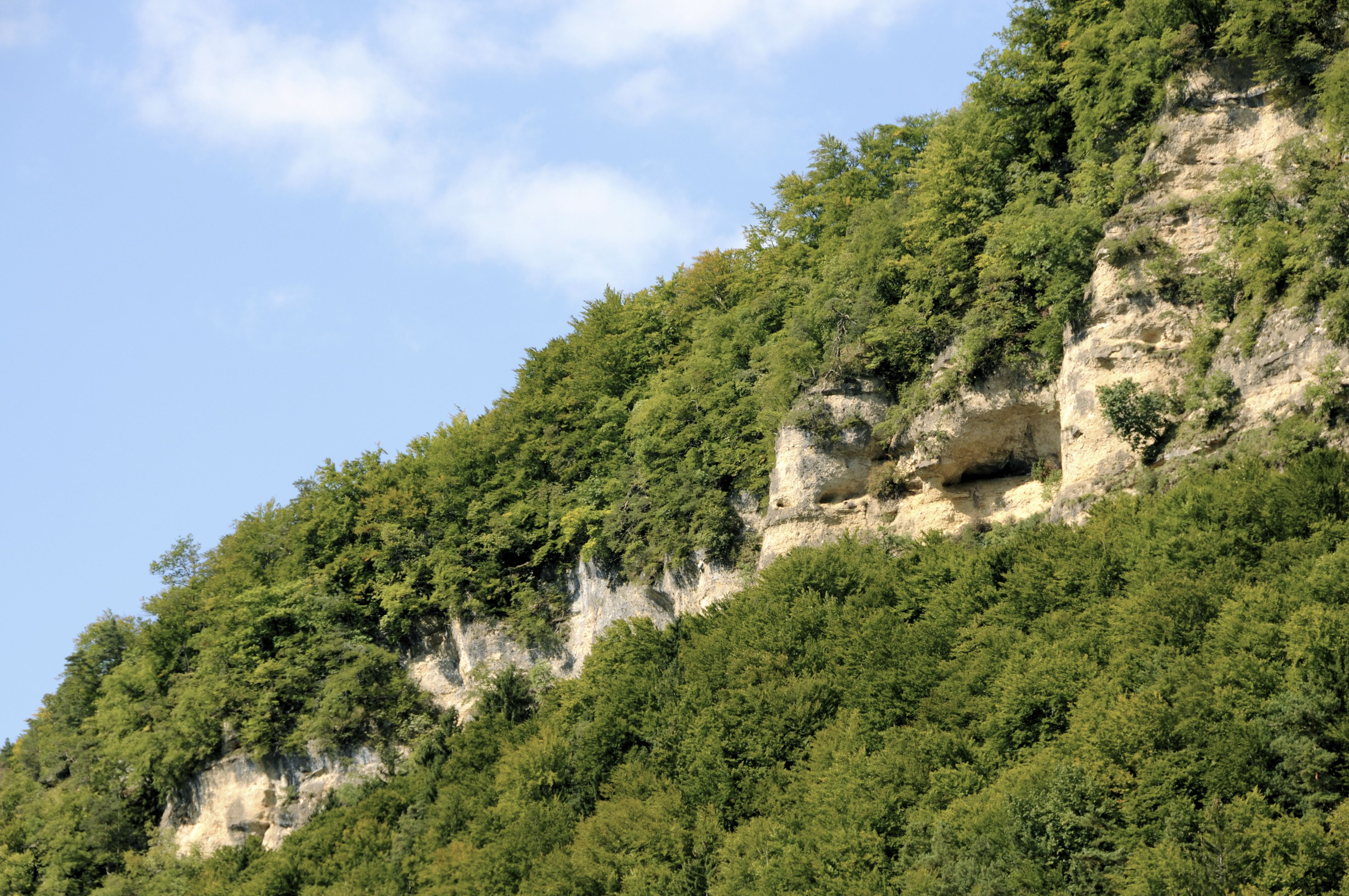
Burgruine Rottenstein in Carinthia

- Burgruine Aichelburg
- Klosterruine Arnoldstein
- Burgruine Dietrichstein
- Burgruine Falkenstein (Oberfalkenstein)
- Burg Falkenstein (Niederfalkenstein)
- Burgruine Feldsberg
- Burgruine Federaun
- Burgruine Finkenstein
- Burgruine Flaschberg
- Burg Freiberg
- Burg Geyersberg
- Burgruine Glanegg
- Burgruine Gmünd
- Burgruine Goldenstein
- Burgruine Gomarn
- Burgruine Gradenegg
- Burgruine Grafenstein
- Burgruine Greifenfels
- Burgruine Griffen
- Burgruine Groppenstein
- Burgruine Grünburg
- Burgruine Gurnitz
- Burg Haimburg
- Burgruine Hardegg
- Burgruine Hartneidstein
- Burgruine Himmelberg
- Burg Hochosterwitz
- Burgruine Hohenburg auf Rosenberg
- Burgruine Hohenwart
- Schloss Hollenburg
- Burgruine Karlsberg
- Burgruine Kühnburg
- Kraiger Schlösser, Burgruinen, Ober-, Niederkraig
- Burgruine Landskron
- Burgruine Lavant
- Burgruine Leobenegg
- Burgruine Leonstein
- Burgruine Lichtengraben/Painburg
- Burgruine Liemberg
- Burgruine Liebenfels
- Burg Mannsberg
- Burgruine Moosburg/Arnulfsfeste
- Burg Neudenstein
- Burgruine Nussberg
- Burgruine Ortenburg
- Burgruine Petersberg
- Burgruine Prägrad
- Burgruine Rabenstein
- Burgruine Ras
- Burgruine Rauchenkatsch
- Burgruine Rauterburg
- Burgruine Rechberg
- Burgruine Reifnitz
- Burgruine Reinegg
- Burgruine Reisberg
- Burgruine Rosegg
- Burgruine Rothenthurn
- Burgruine Schaumburg
- Burgruine Silberberg
- Burg Sommeregg
- Burgruine Sonegg
- Burg Stein/Drautal
- Burgruine Stein/Lavanttal
- Burgruine Stein/Jauntal
- Burgruine Sternberg
- Burgruine Steuerberg
- Burg Straßburg
- Burgruine Straßfried
- Burgruine Taggenbrunn
- Burgruine Treffen
- Burgruinen Trixen (Nieder-, Ober-, Mittertrixen)
- Burgruine Twimberg
- Burgruine Waisenberg
- Burgruine Weidenburg
- Burgruine Weißenegg
- Burgruine Wullroß

== Lower Austria ==
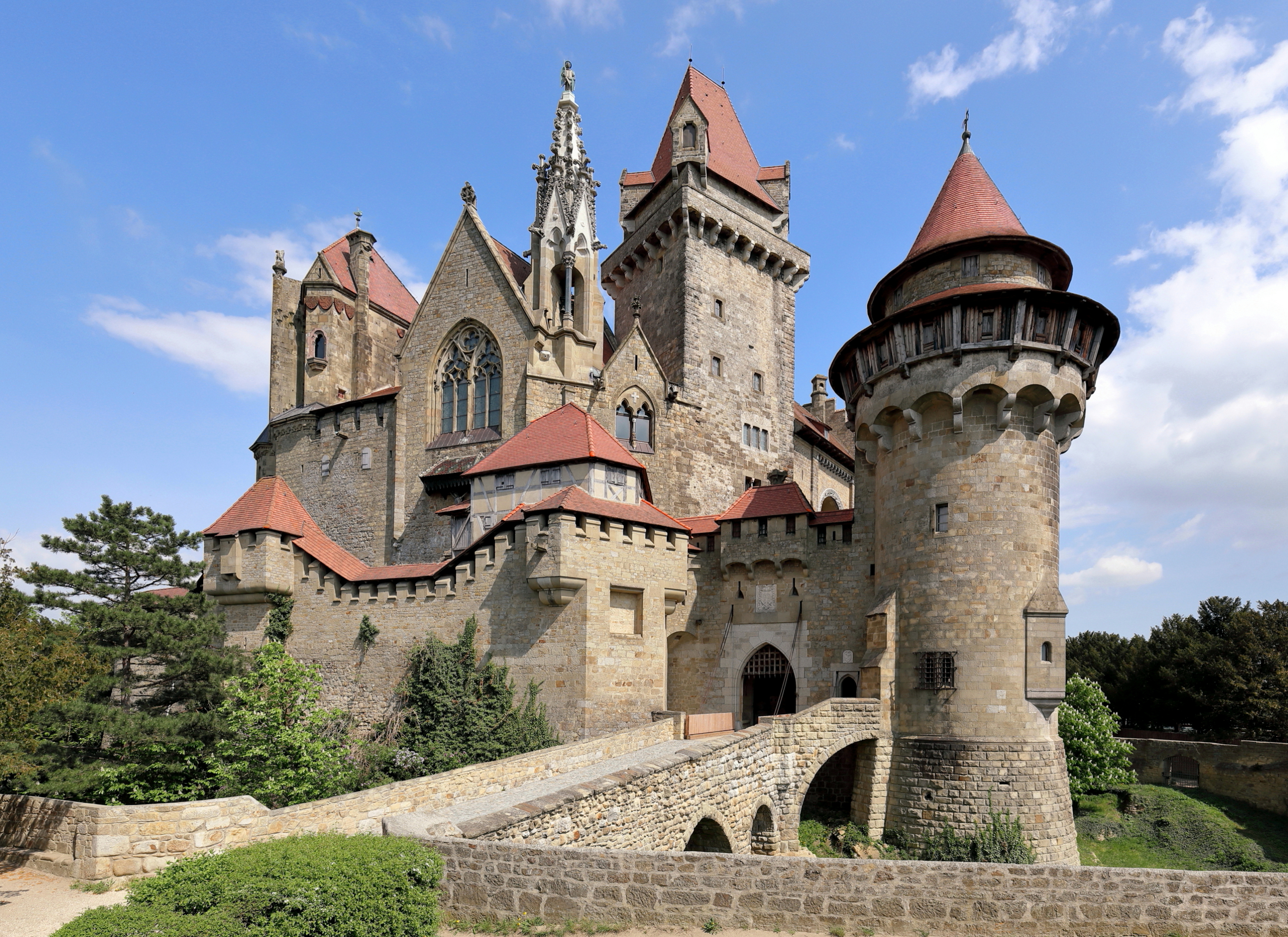
Burg Kreuzenstein

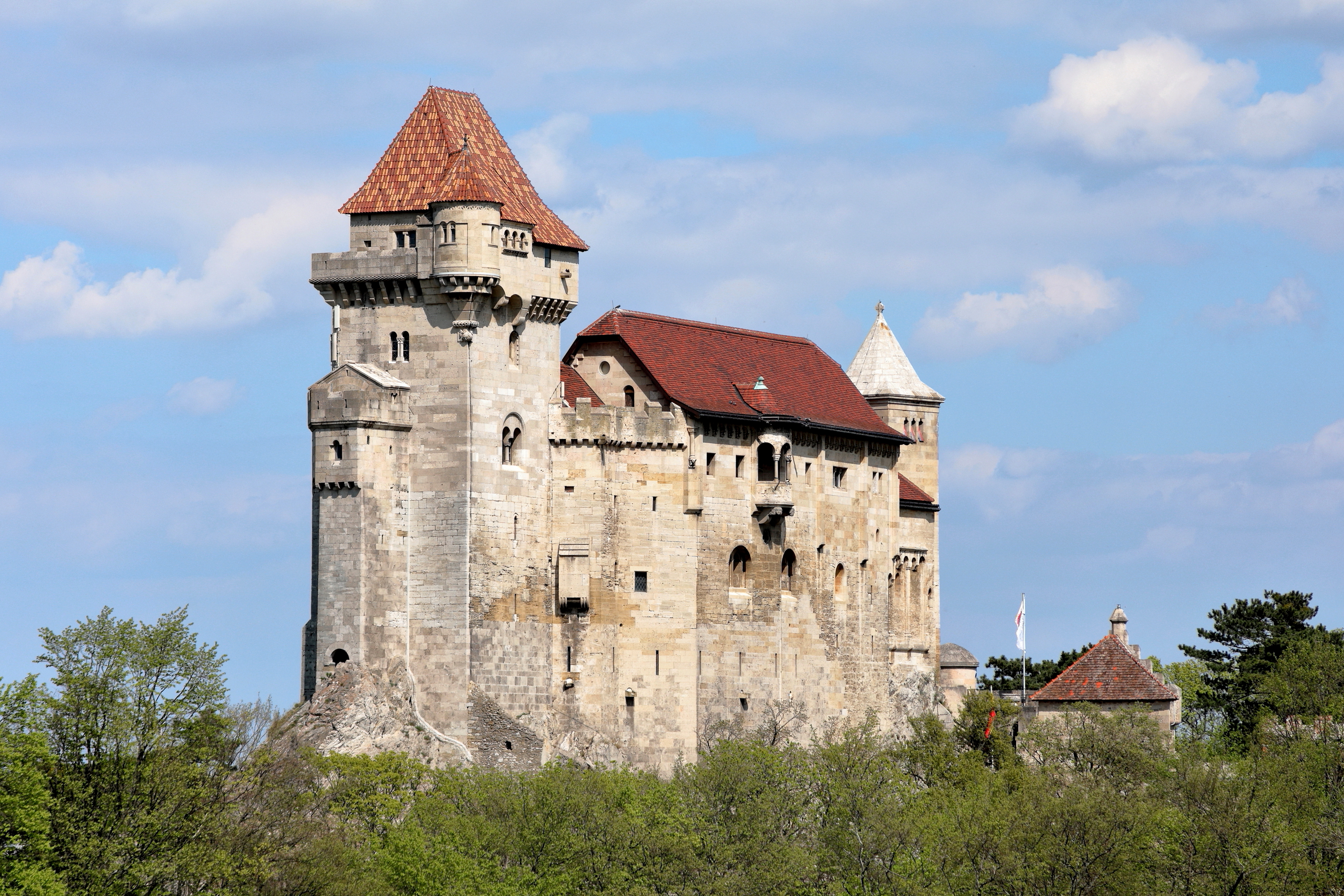
Burg Liechtenstein

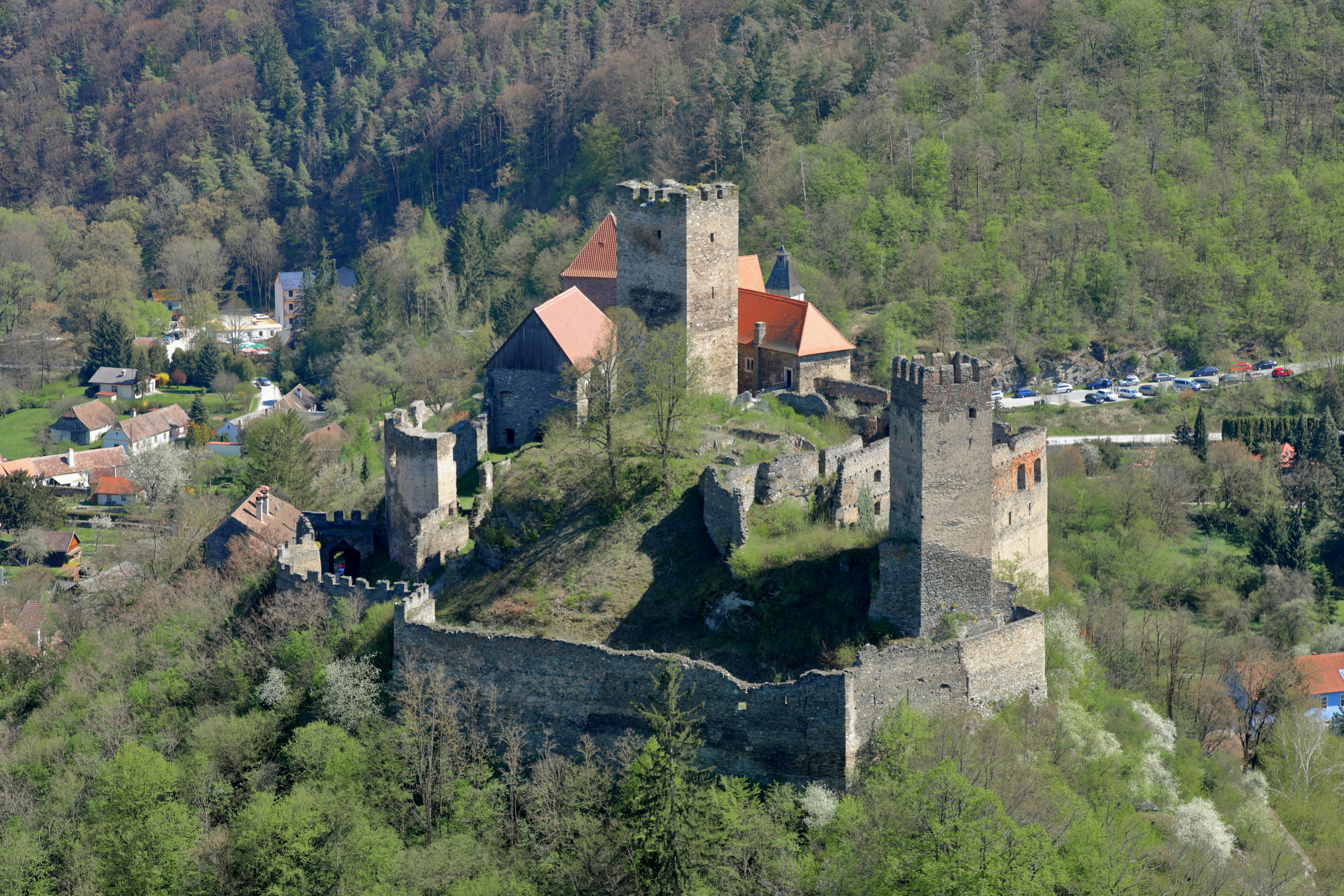
Burg Hardegg

- Burgruine Aggstein
- Burgruine Araburg
- Burgruine Dobra
- Burgruine Dürnstein
- Burg Falkenstein
- Franzensburg, Laxenburg
- Burg Greifenstein
- Burg Grub
- Burg Hardegg
- Burg Hartenstein
- Burg Heidenreichstein
- Burgruine Kaja
- Burg Karlstein
- Burgruine Kollmitz
- Burg Kreuzenstein
- Burg Liechtenstein
- Burgruine Mödling
- Burg Neulengbach
- Burg Ottenstein
- Burg Perchtoldsdorf
- Burg Plankenstein
- Burg Persenbeug
- Burg Raabs an der Thaya
- Burg Rappottenstein
- Burgruine Rauheneck
- Burg Rauhenstein
- Rosenburg
- Burg Rundersburg
- Schallaburg
- Burg Scharfeneck
- Burg Seebenstein
- Burgruine Senftenberg
- Burgruine Starhemberg
- Schloss Walpersdorf
- Burg Wiener Neustadt

== Salzburg ==
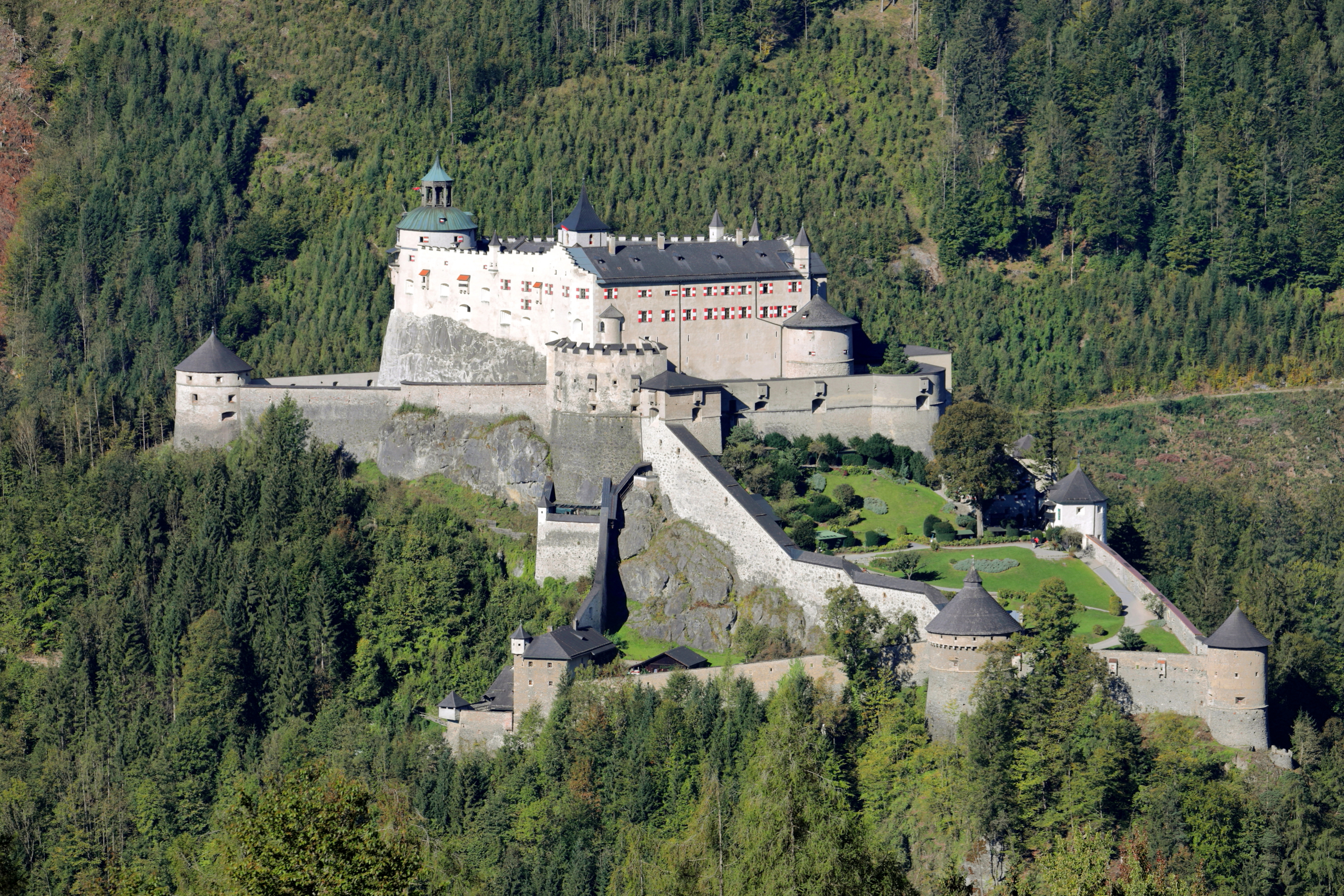
Burg Hohenwerfen

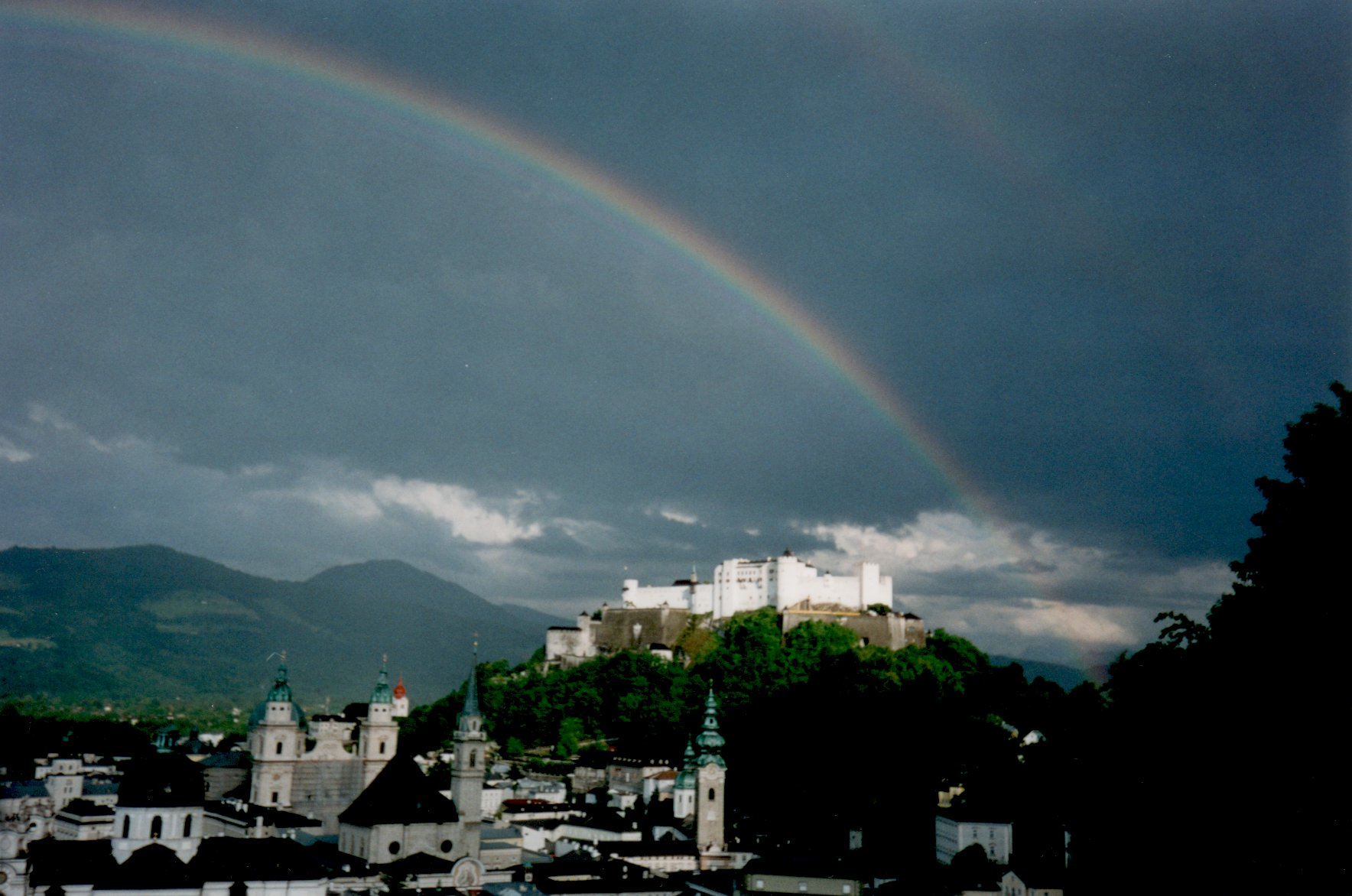
Festung Hohensalzburg

- Burgruine Edenvest
- Burg Finstergrün
- Burgruine Friedburg, Neukirchen am Großvenediger
- Burg Golling
- Burgruine Gutrat
- Burgruine Hieburg, Neukirchen am Großvenediger
- Festung Hohensalzburg, Salzburg
- Burg Hohenwerfen, Werfen
- Burg Mauterndorf
- Burg Moosham
- Burgruine Plainburg
- Burgruine Saalegg
- Castle Saalhof
- Burgruine Wartenfels
- Burgruine Weyer, Bramberg

== Styria ==
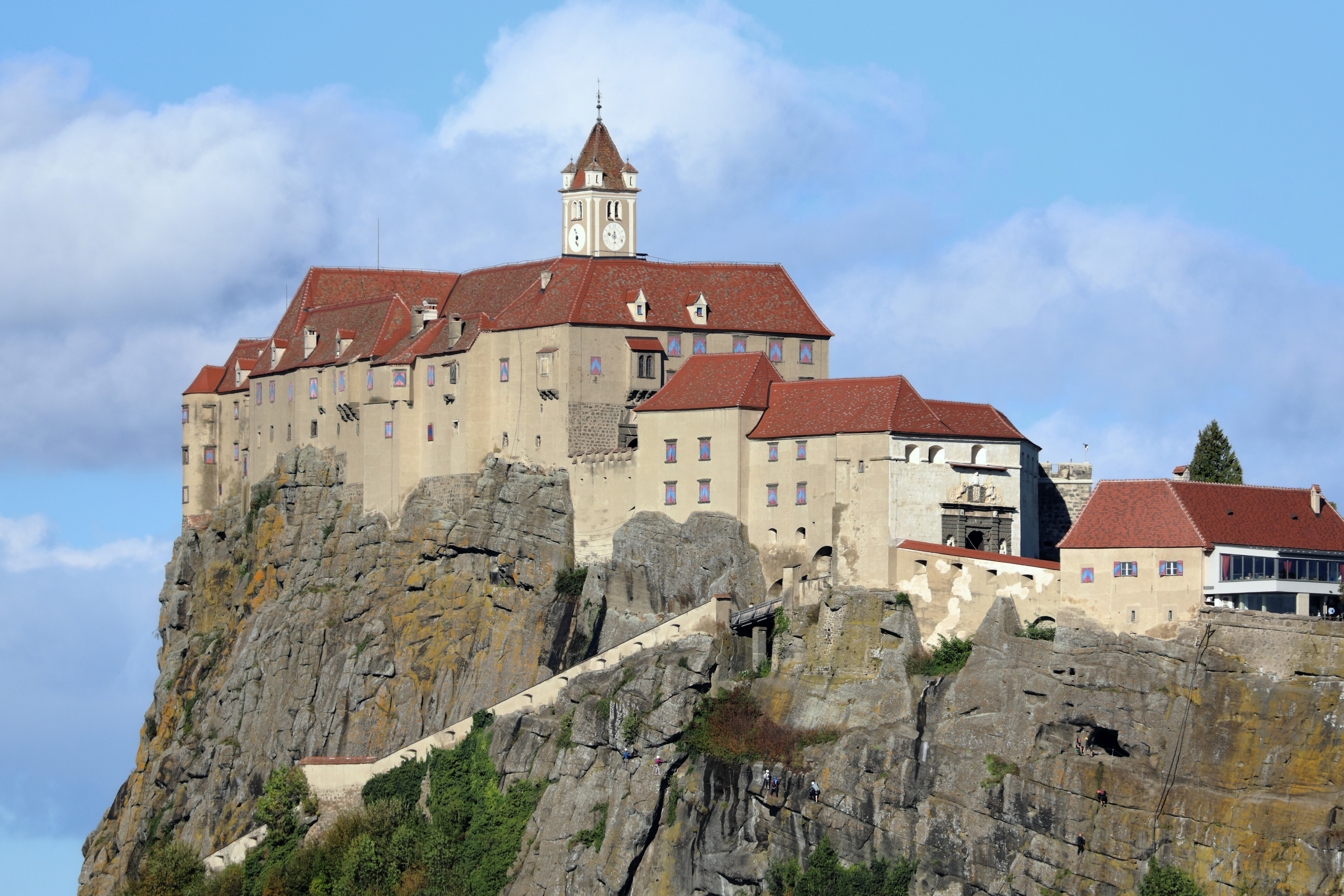
Riegersburg Castle

- Burg Alt-Teuffenbach
- Burg Baiersdorf
- Schloss Burgstall
- Burg Deutschlandsberg
- Burg Dürnstein
- Schloss Eggenberg (Graz)
- Burg Ehrenfels (St. Radegund)
- Schloss Ehrenhausen
- Burgruine Eppenstein
- Schloss Feistritz / Ilz
- Burg Festenburg
- Burgruine Fohnsdorf
- Burg Forchtenstein
- Frauenburg
- Schloss Frondsberg
- Burgruine Gallenstein
- Schloss Gleichenberg
- Gösting Castle
- Schloss Grosssölk
- Burg Grünfels
- Schloss Gutenberg
- Ruine Hauenstein
- Ruine Henneberg
- Schloss Herberstein
- Ruine Hohenwang
- Burg Kammerstein/ Ehrenfels
- Ruine Kalsberg
- Burg Kaisersberg
- Ruine Katsch
- Ruine Klingenstein /Salla
- Ruine Klöch
- Burg Krems
- Ruine Ligist
- Burg Neuberg
- Burg Neuhaus bei Stubenberg
- Ruine Neu-Leonroth
- Burg Lichtenegg
- Ruine Liechtenstein
- Ruine Neudeck
- Burg Oberkapfenberg
- Schloss Obermurau
- Burg Obervoitsberg
- Ruine Offenburg
- Ruine Pernegg
- Ruine Pflindsberg
- Burgruine Pfannberg
- Burgruine Pikeroi
- Ruine Puxer-Loch
- Ruine Raabeck
- Schloss Rabenstein
- Burgruine Reifenstein
- Riegersburg Castle
- Ruine Burg Schachenstein
- Ruine Schmirnberg
- Schloss Seggau
- Burgruine Steinschloß
- Burgruine Sturmberg
- Burg Thalberg
- Burg Waldstein
- Burgruine Waxenegg
- Burgruine Wildon
- Burgruine Wolkenstein

== Tyrol ==
The Tyrol is named after Tirol Castle, which was formerly in Austria but is now in Italy.

- Ambras Palace
- Burg Bideneck
- Burg Bruck
- Burg Freundsberg
- Burg Heinfels
- Itter Castle
- Burg Kropfsberg
- Burg Laudegg
- Burg Lichtenwerth
- Kapsburg
- Kufstein Fortress
- Schloss Naudersberg
- Tratzberg Castle
- Wiesberg Castle

== Upper Austria ==
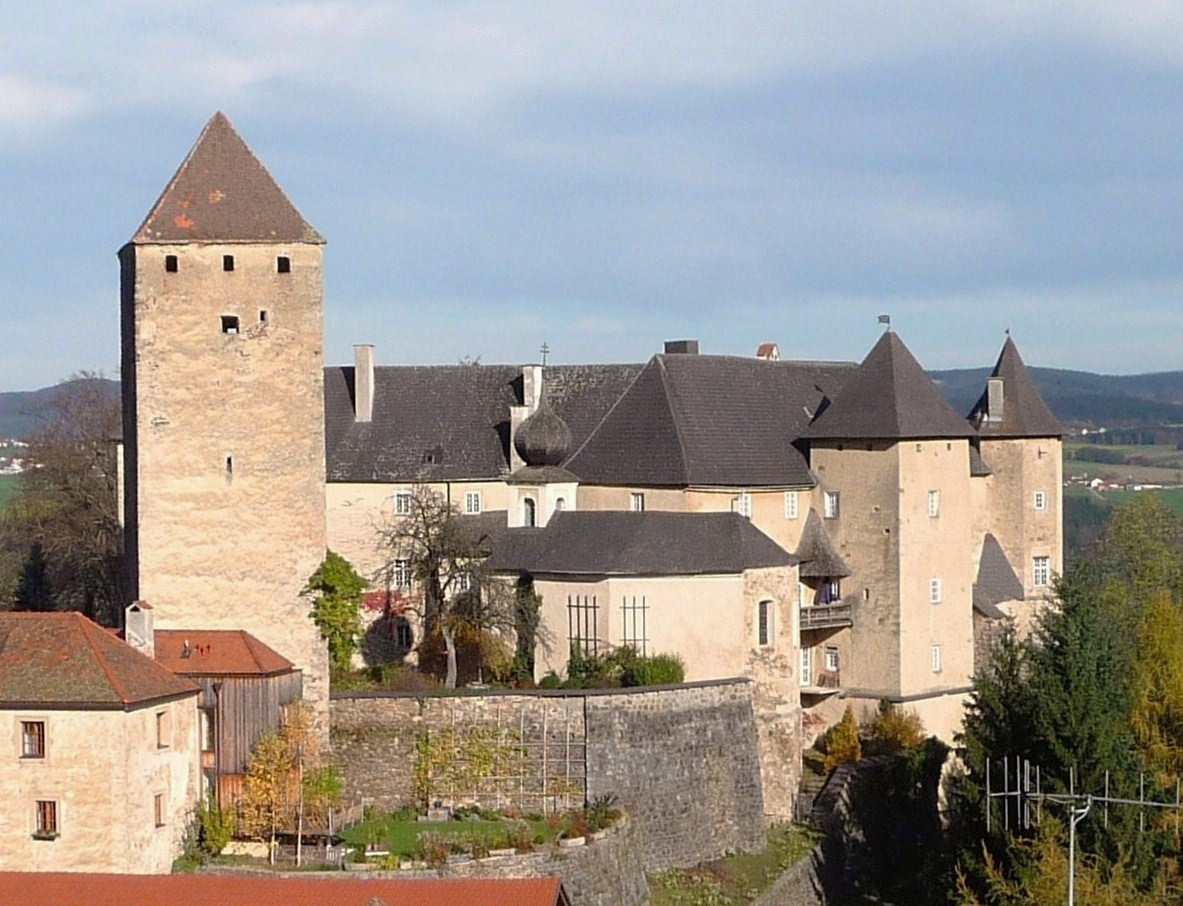
Burg Vichtenstein

- Burg Altpernstein
- Burg Clam
- Eschelberg Castle
- Burg Neuhaus
- Schloss Orth
- Prandegg Castle
- Burg Pürnstein
- Rottenegg Castle
- Burg Vichtenstein

== Vorarlberg ==
- Burg Schattenburg
- Burg Neu-Ems
- Burgruine Neu-Montfort

== See also ==
- List of castles
