= Burg Baiersdorf =

Castle in Styria, Austria

- Styria, Austria
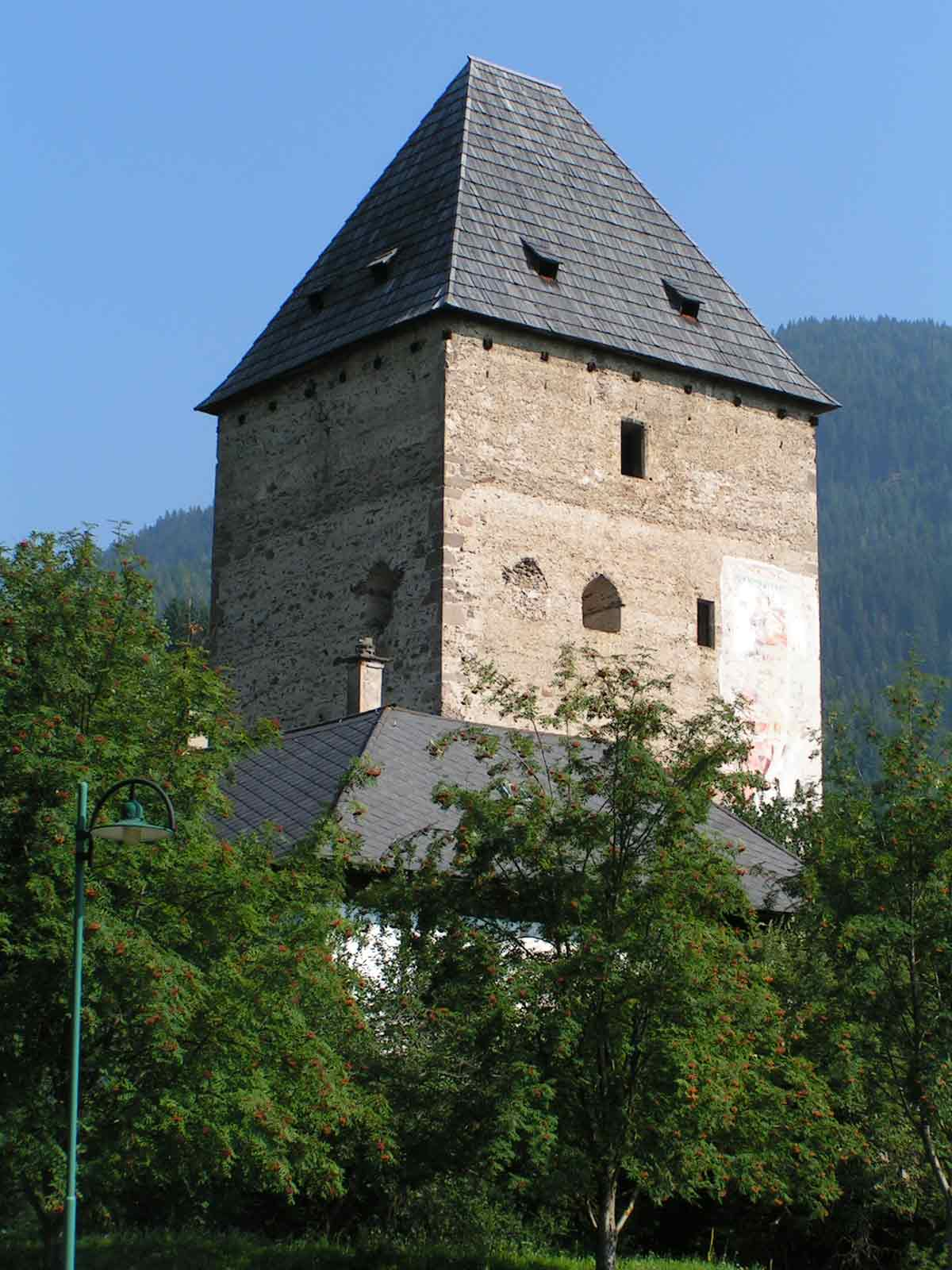
- Burg Baiersdorf in 2005

Site information
- Type: Castle

Location
- Coordinates: 47°11′23.3″N 14°7′42.2″E

Burg Baiersdorf is a castle in Styria, Austria. The castle, which includes a six-storey tower, was once surrounded by a moat and a wall, and dates to the 13th century.

== See also ==
- List of castles in Austria
