= Burg Lichtenwerth =

Castle in Austria

Coordinates: 47°25′11″N 11°51′36″E

- Tyrol, Austria
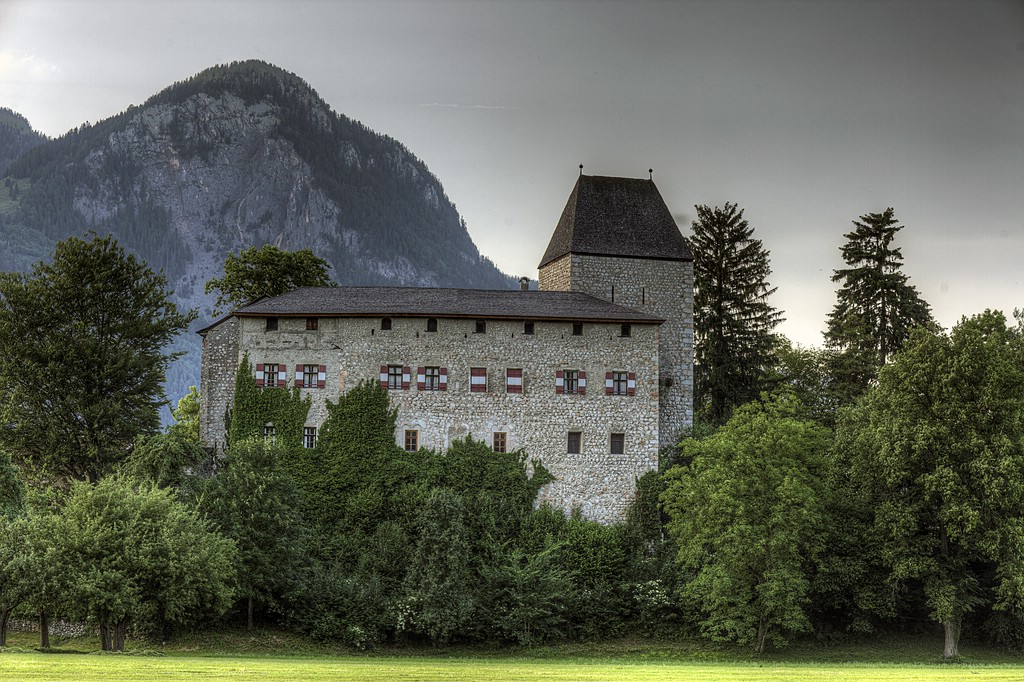
- Castle Lichtenwerth in Münster, Tyrol.

Site information
- Type: Castle

Burg Lichtenwerth is a castle in Münster municipality of the Austrian state of Tyrol. Burg Lichtenwerth is 366 metres (1,201 ft) above sea level.

== See also ==
- List of castles in Austria
