= Burg Kaisersberg =

Castle in Styria, Austria

Coordinates: 47.335°N 14.980°E

- Styria, Austria
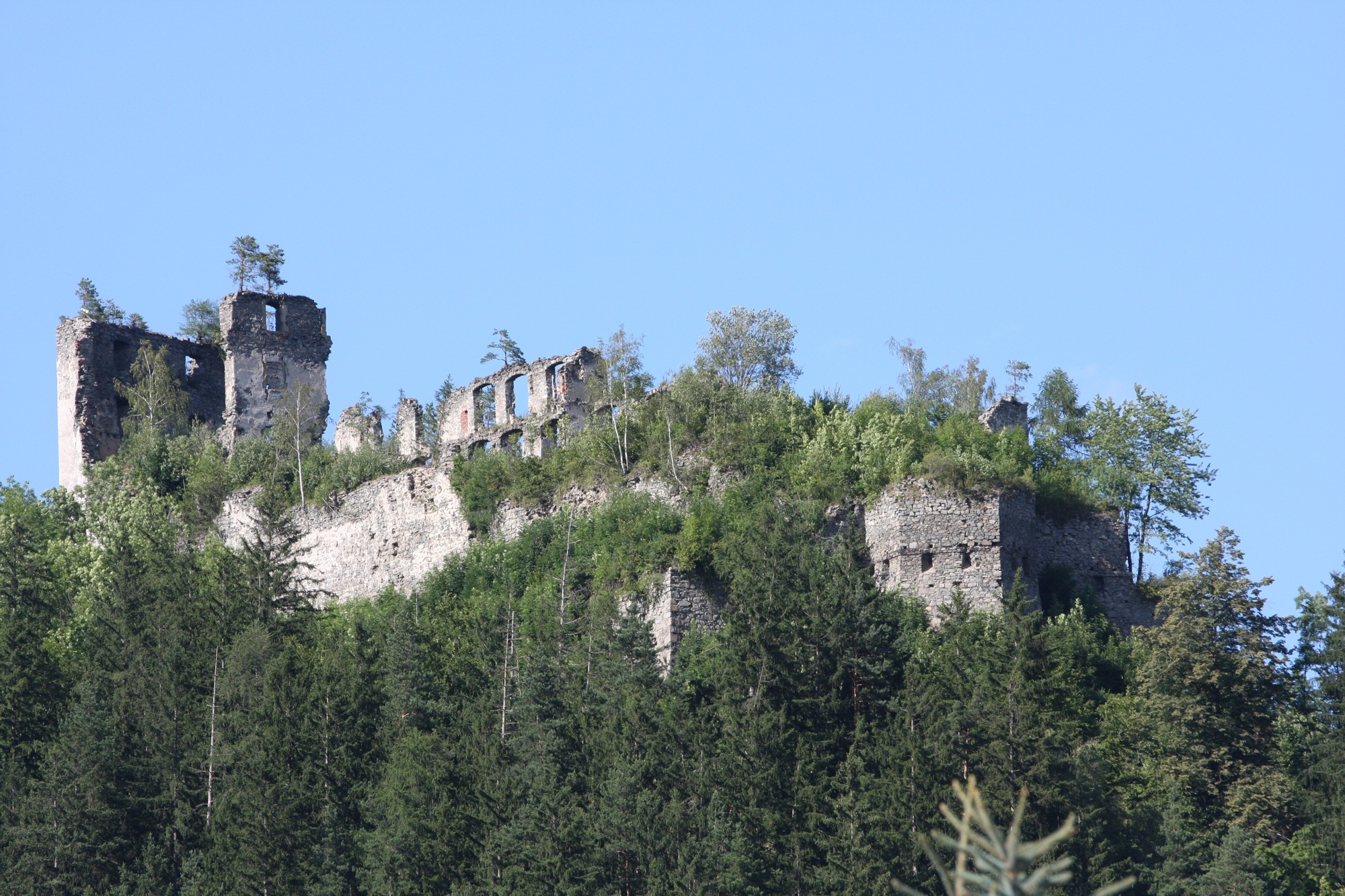

Site information
- Type: Castle

Burg Kaisersberg is a castle in Styria, Austria.

== See also ==
- List of castles in Austria
