= Burg Freiberg =

Castle in Austria

Coordinates: 46.7879°N 14.3435°E

- Carinthia, Austria
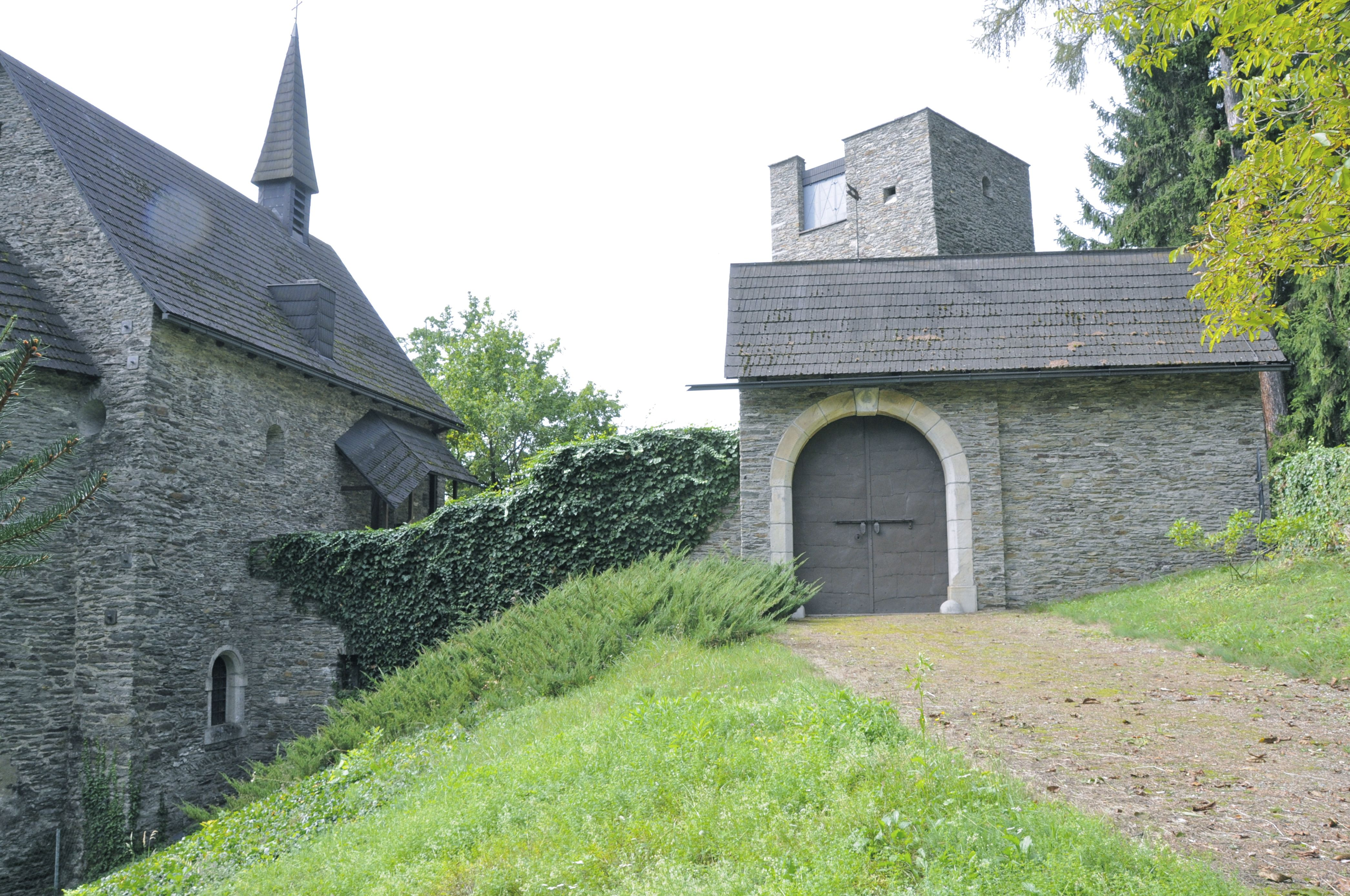

Site information
- Type: Castle

Site history
- Built: 12th century

Burg Freiberg is a castle in Carinthia, Austria. It was first mentioned in 1181 and was likely built in the 12th century.

== See also ==
- List of castles in Austria
