= Burgruine Gurnitz =

Castle in Carinthia, Austria

Coordinates: 46°35′54″N 14°22′20″E

- Carinthia, Austria
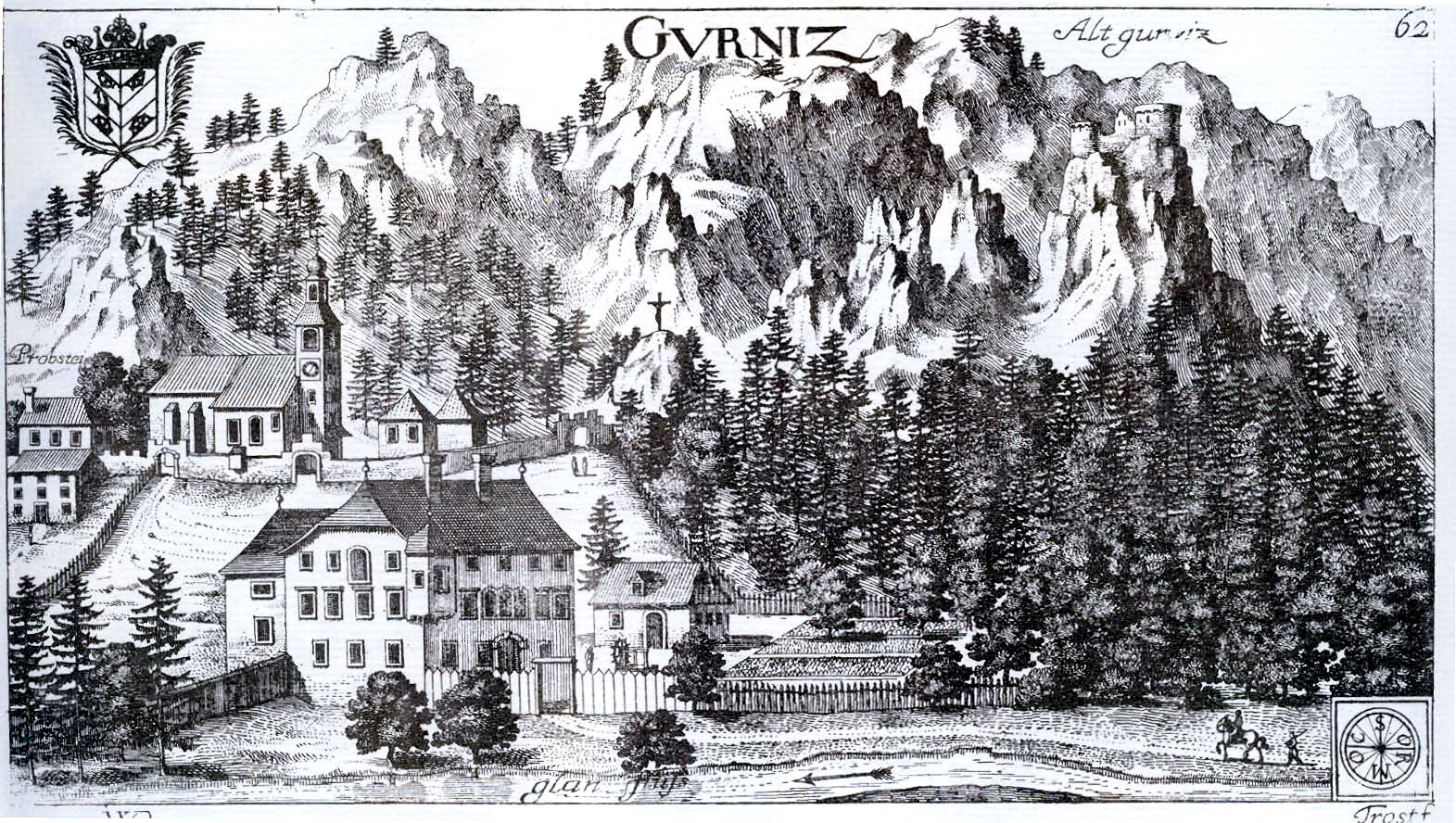
- Castle Gurnitz (1688)

Site information
- Type: Castle

Burgruine Gurnitz is a castle in Carinthia, Austria.

== See also ==
- List of castles in Austria
