= Burgruine Pikeroi =

Castle ruins in Austria

- Styria, Austria

Site information
- Type: Castle

Burgruine Pikeroi is a ruined castle in Styria, Austria.

== See also ==
- List of castles in Austria
