= Kapsburg =

Castle in Austria

Coordinates: 47°26′33.7″N 12°24′2.5″E

- Tyrol, Austria

Site information
- Type: Castle

Kapsburg is a castle in Tyrol, Austria.

== See also ==
- List of castles in Austria
