= Burgruine Goldenstein =

Castle ruin in Austria

- Carinthia, Austria
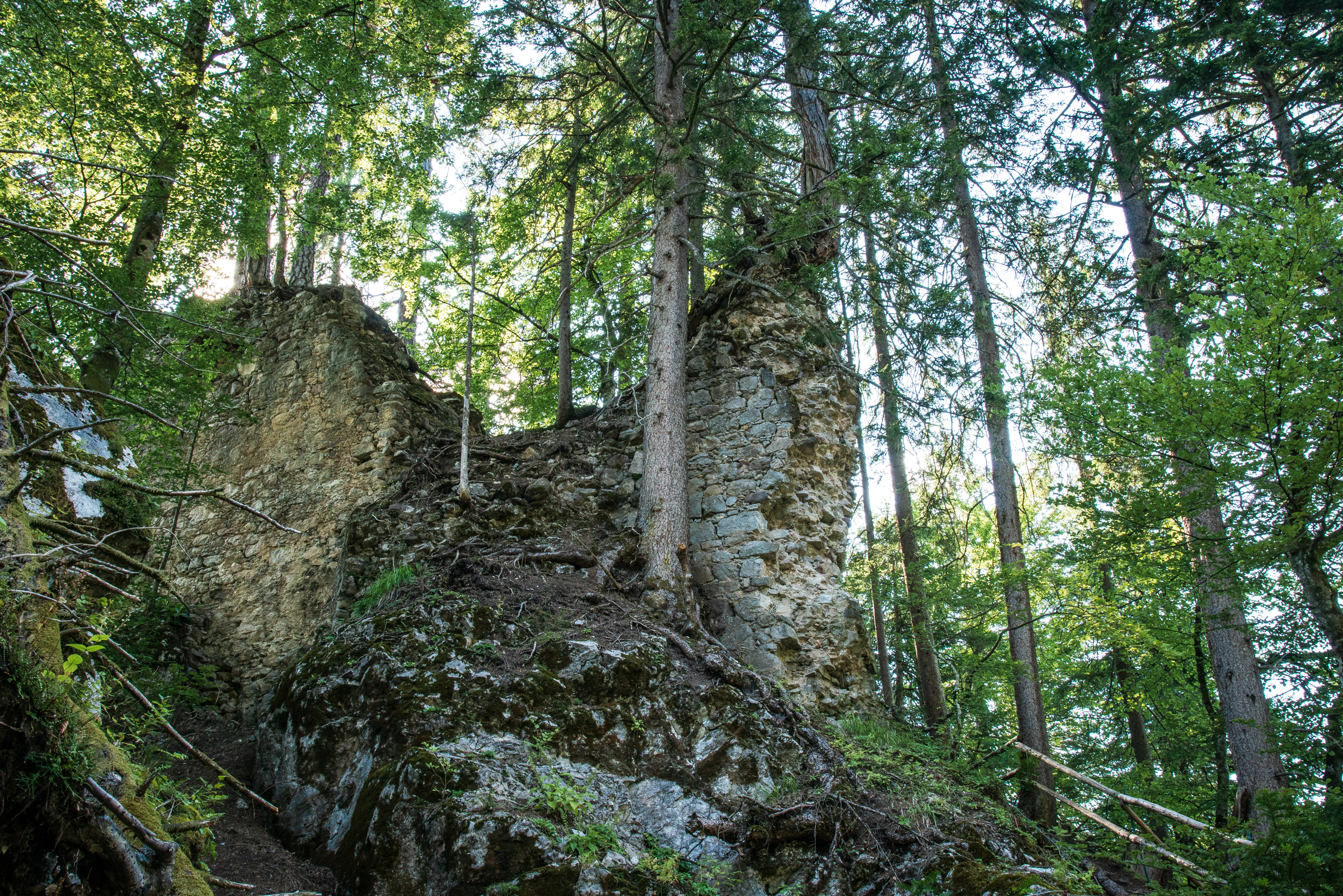

Site information
- Type: Castle

Location
- Coordinates: 46.683123°N 13.066629°E

Burgruine Goldenstein is a castle ruin in Carinthia, Austria. The name comes from now-extant gold mining from the area.

A building among the ruins, the Goldburg, was destroyed in 1227 and probably rebuilt. The "Goldenstein" was built by Niklas von Flaschberg in 1325, but shortly after its ownership changed. In the following decades it was destroyed several times by raids from the Turks near the end of the 15th century.

== See also ==
- List of castles in Austria
