= Burg Pürnstein =

Castle in Austria

Coordinates: 48°30′07″N 14°00′45″E

- Upper Austria, Austria
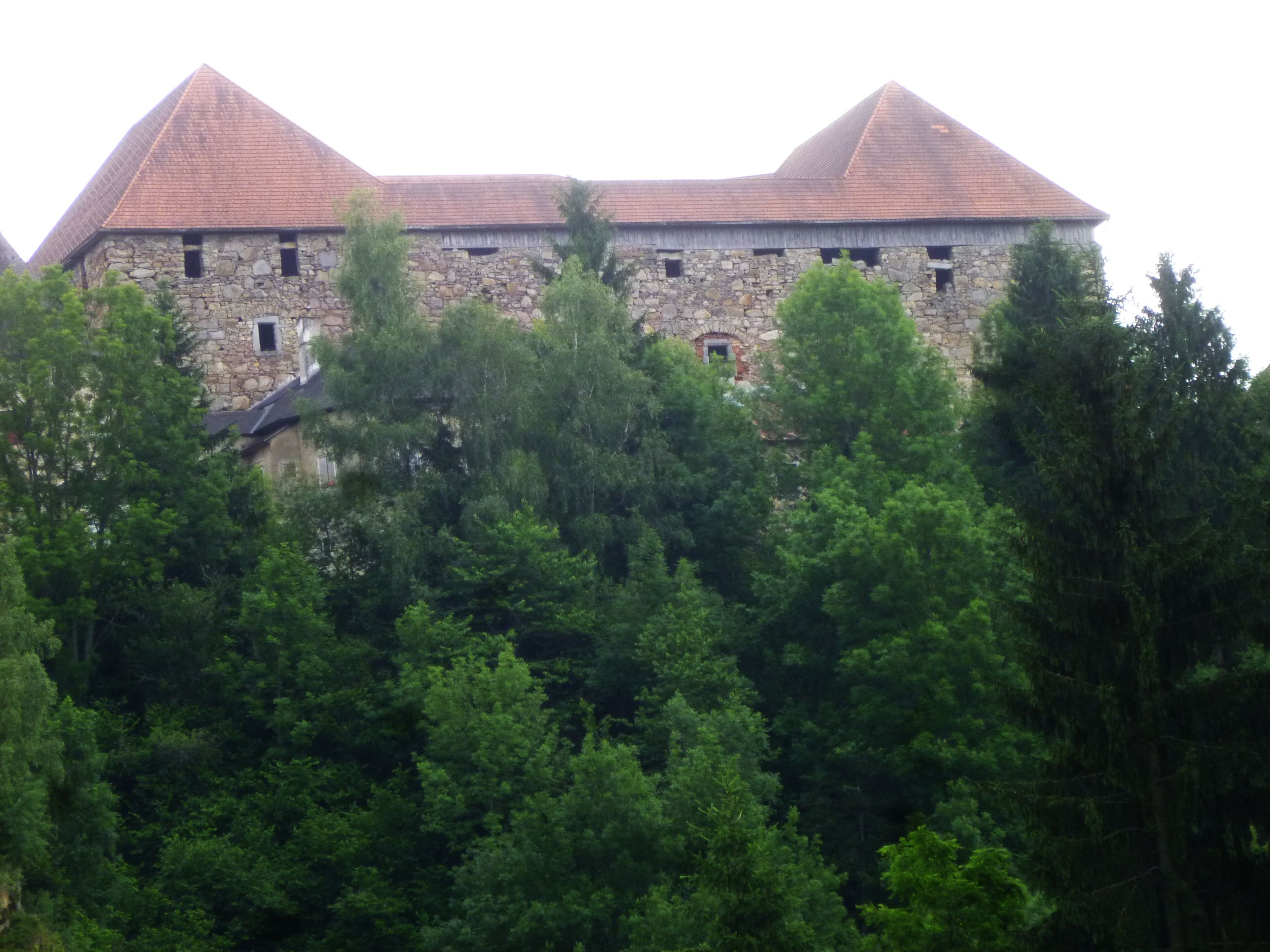

Site information
- Type: Castle

Burg Pürnstein is a castle in Upper Austria, Austria. Burg Pürnstein is 537 metres (1,762 ft) above sea level.

== See also ==
- List of castles in Austria
