= Burg Neudenstein =

Castle in Austria

Coordinates: 46.645°N 14.586°E

- Carinthia, Austria
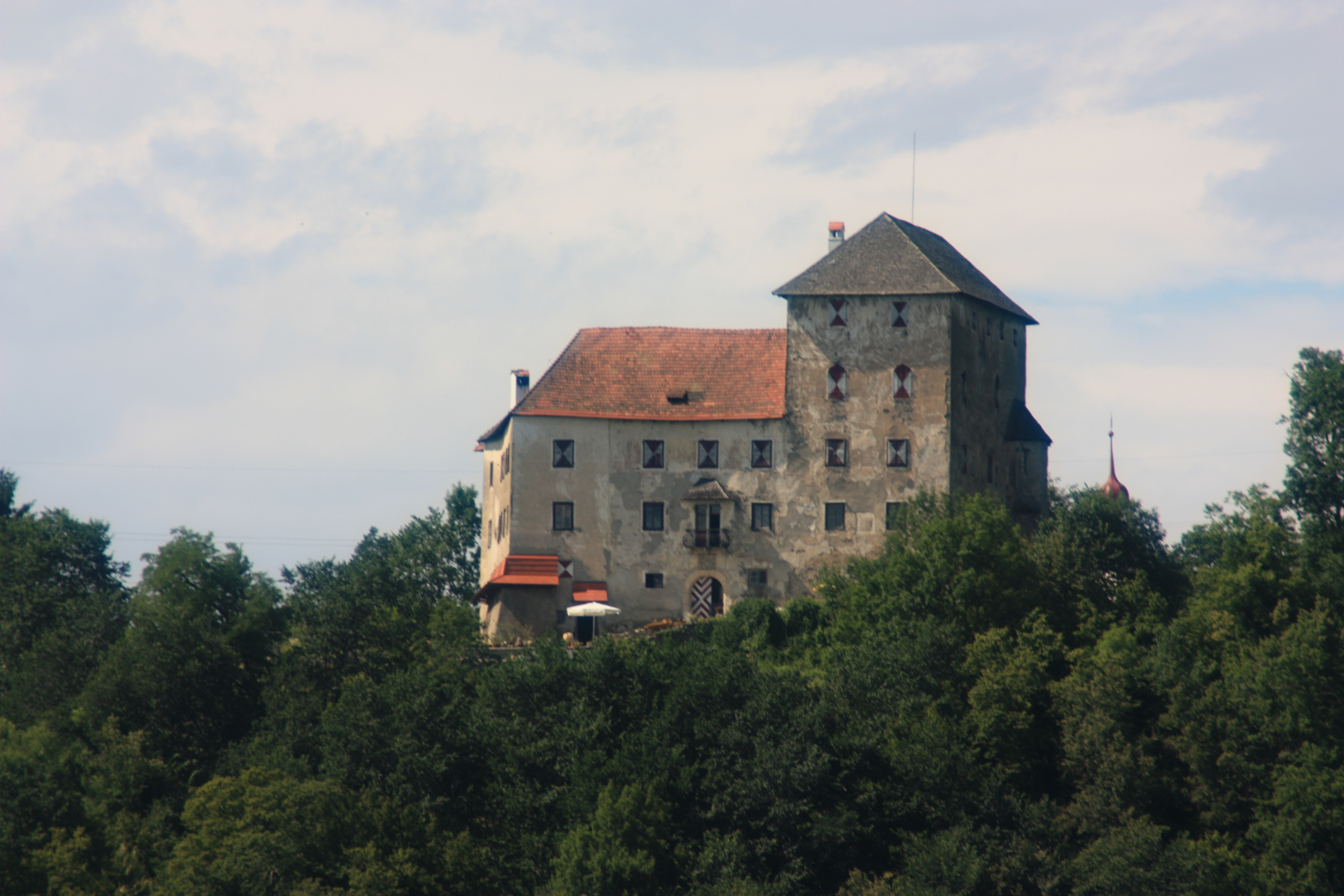

Site information
- Type: Castle

Site history
- Built: 1329
- Built by: Konrad von Auffenstein

Burg Neudenstein is a castle in Carinthia, Austria. Burg Neudenstein is situated at a height of 439 m.

== See also ==
- List of castles in Austria
