= Burgruine Friedburg =

Demolished Austrian castle

- Salzburg, Austria
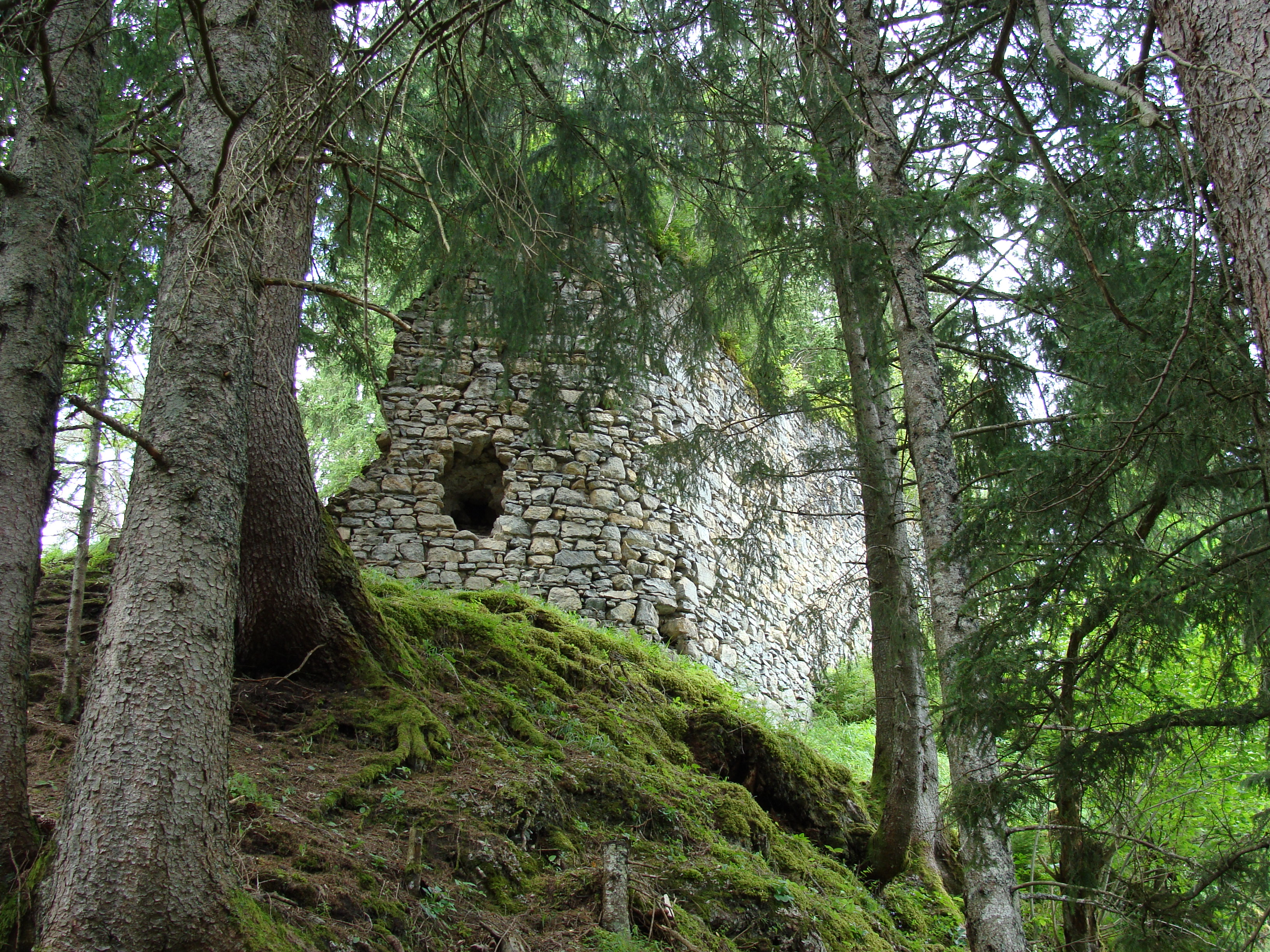

Site information
- Type: Hillside castle

Location
- Coordinates: 47°13′59.9″N 12°13′59.9″E

Site history
- Built: around 1000

Burgruine Friedburg was a castle, now demolished, in the state of Salzburg, Austria.

== See also ==
- List of castles in Austria
