= Schloss Grosssölk =

Castle in Styria, Austria

- Styria, Austria
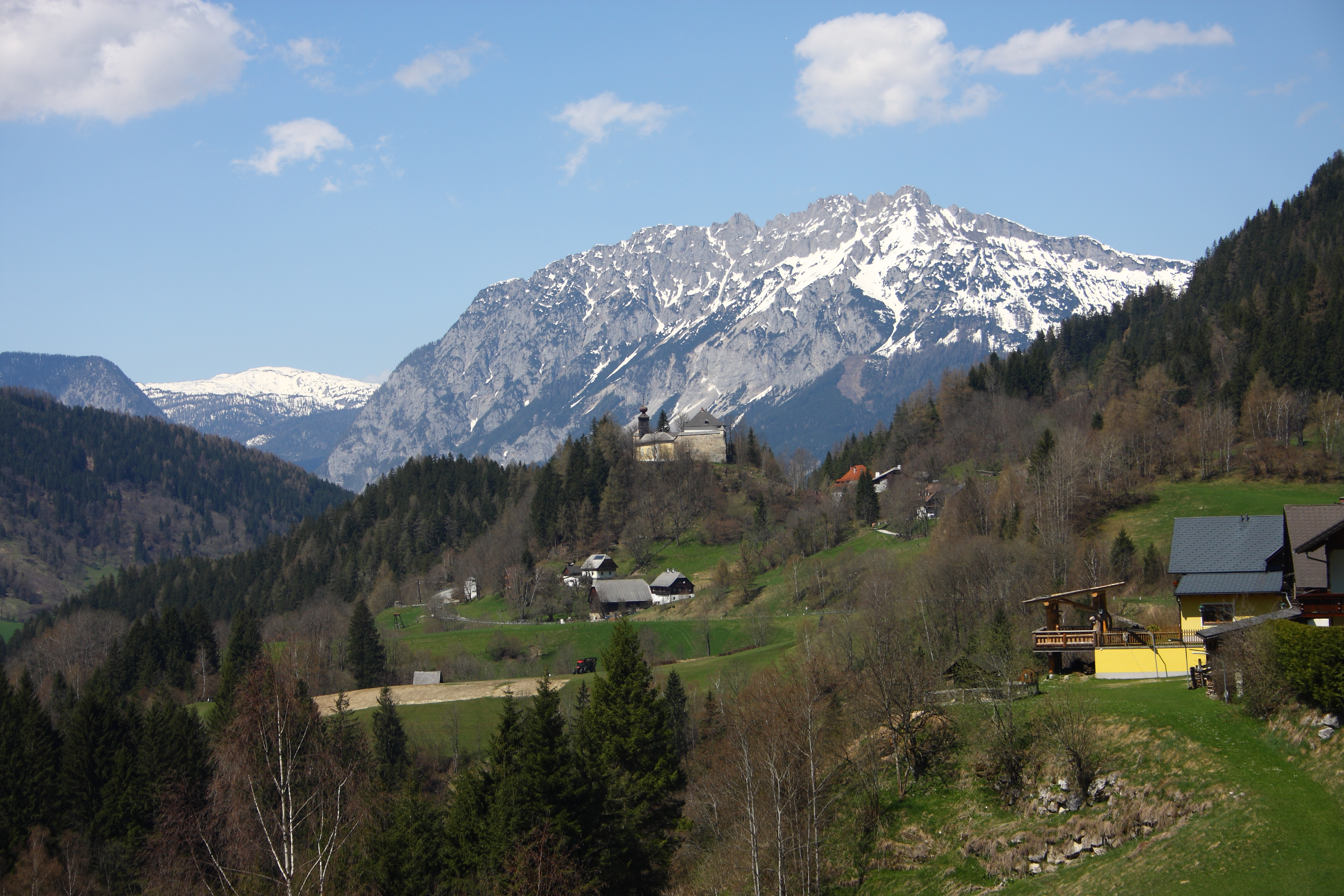

Site information
- Type: Castle

Location
- Coordinates: 47°24′34″N 13°57′58″E

Schloss Grosssölk is a castle in Styria, Austria. Schloss Grosssölk is situated at an elevation of 932 m.

== See also ==
- List of castles in Austria
