= Burgruine Wullroß =

Castle in Carinthia, Austria

- Carinthia, Austria
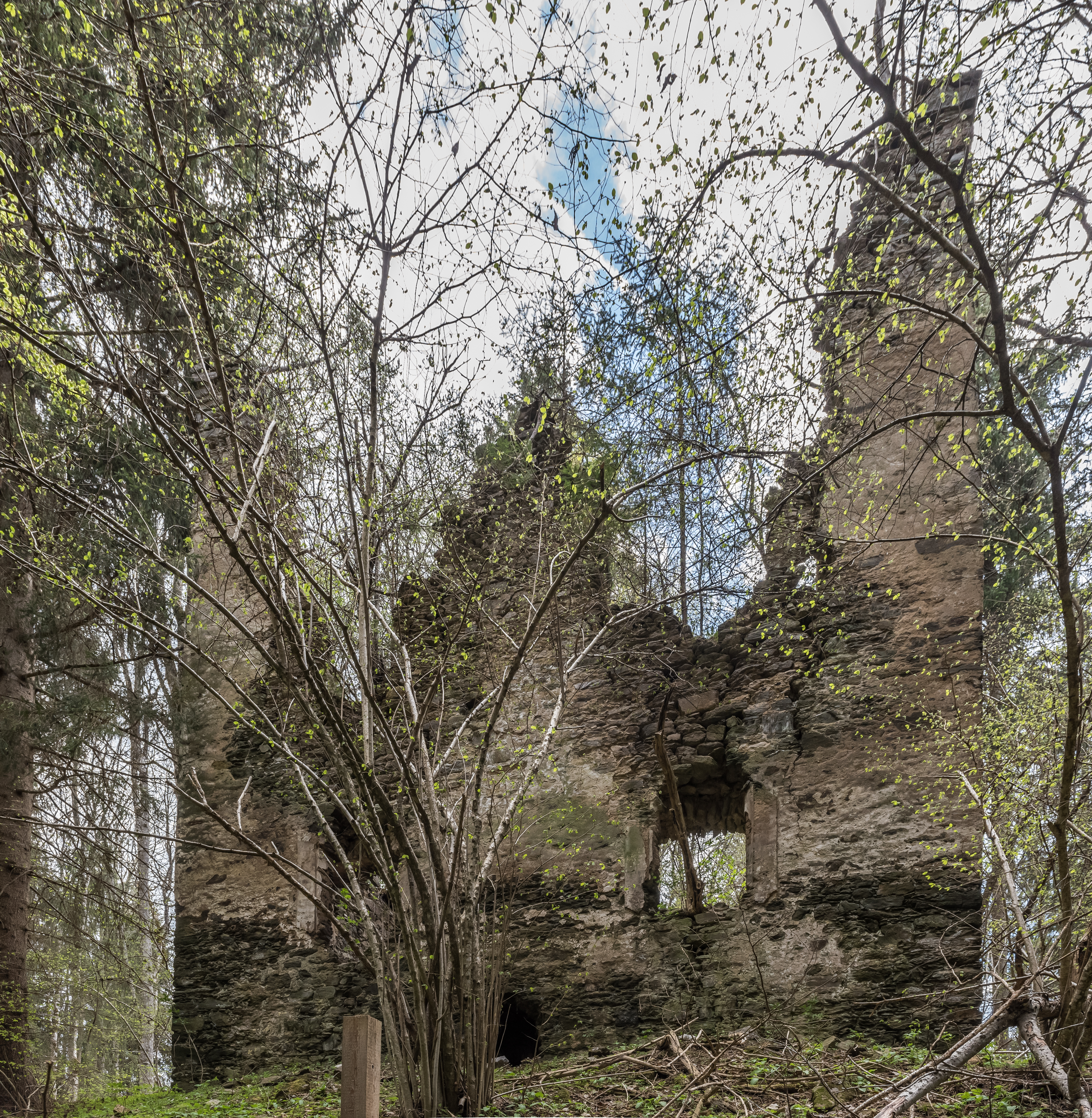
- Ruins of Burgruine Wullroß in 2016

Site information
- Type: Hilltop castle

Location
- Coordinates: 46°48′51″N 14°12′46″E

Site history
- Built: First mention around 1200

Burgruine Wullroß is a medieval castle in Carinthia, Austria.

== See also ==
- List of castles in Austria
