= Burg Lichtenegg =

Castle ruins in Sankt Barbara im Mürztal, Austria

- Styria, Austria
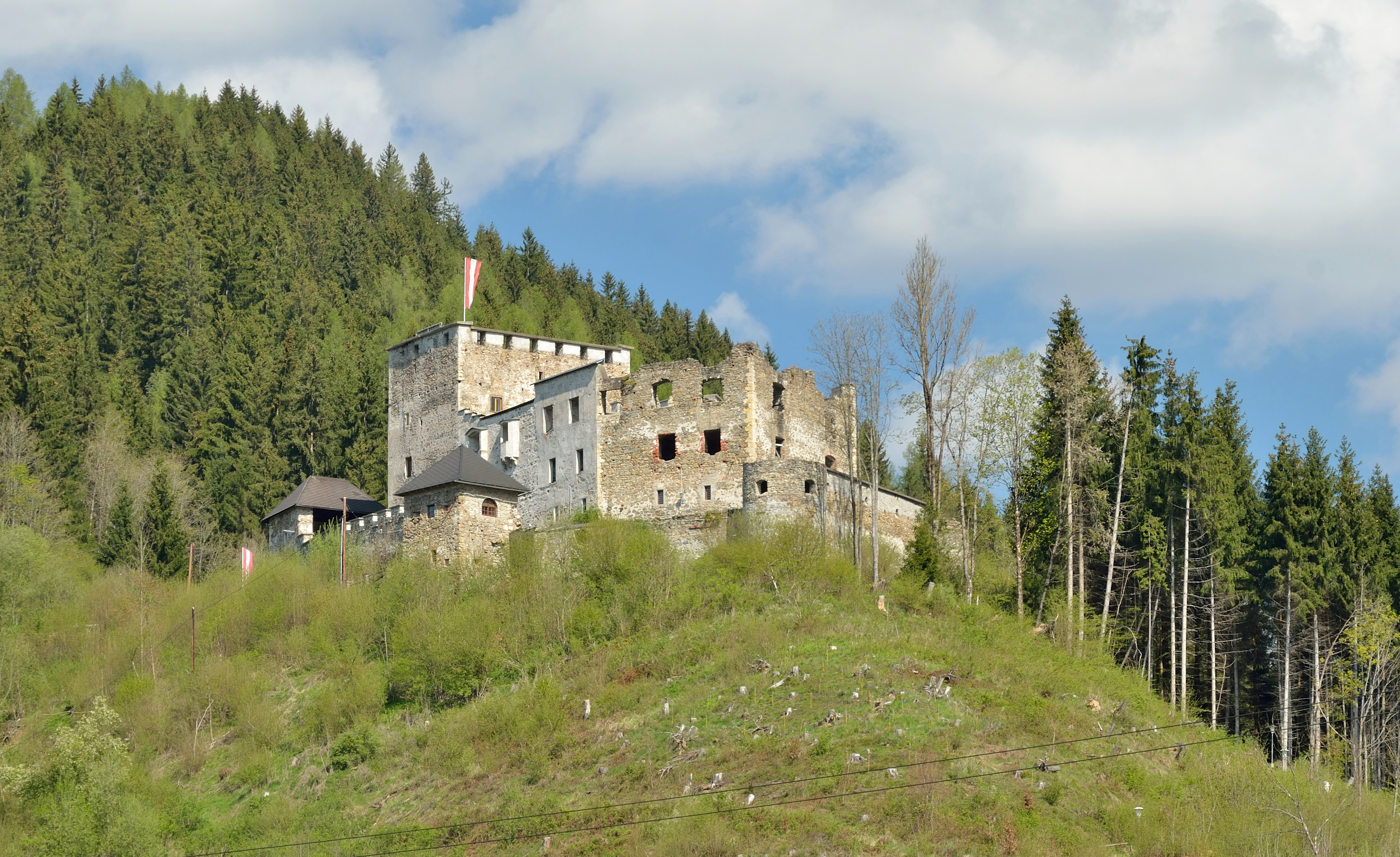
- Burgruine Lichtenegg (2017)

Site information
- Type: Hilltop castle

Location
- Coordinates: 47°31′47″N 15°28′57″E

Burg Lichtenegg is a castle in Styria, Austria.

== See also ==
- List of castles in Austria
