= Burgruine Waisenberg =

Castle ruin in Carinthia, Austria

Coordinates: 46°41′54″N 14°33′43″E

- Carinthia, Austria
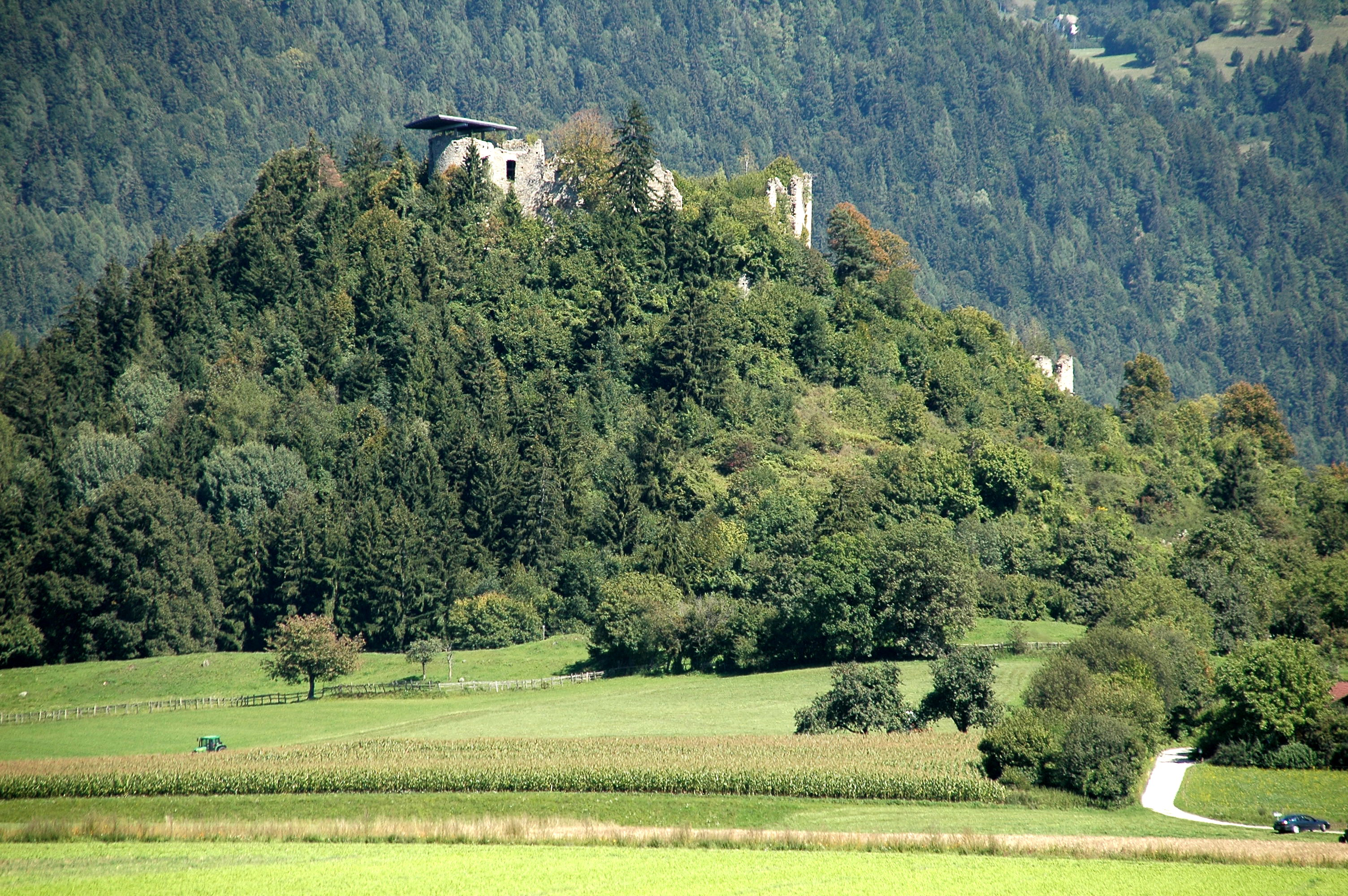

Site information
- Type: Hilltop castle

Site history
- Built: 12th Century

Burgruine Waisenberg is a castle in Carinthia, Austria.

== See also ==
- List of castles in Austria
