= Ronneburg, Hesse =

Ronneburg
- Municipality
- Coat of arms

- Location of Ronneburg within Main-Kinzig-Kreis district
- Interactive map of Ronneburg
- Location within Germany Location within Hesse
- Coordinates: 50°14′N 09°03′E
- Country: Germany
- State: Hesse
- Admin. region: Darmstadt
- District: Main-Kinzig-Kreis

Government
  - Mayor (2018–24): Andreas Hofmann

Area
  - Total: 14.25 km^{2} (5.50 sq mi)
- Elevation: 169 m (554 ft)

Population (2025-12-31)
  - Total: 3,535
  - Density: 248.1/km^{2} (642.5/sq mi)
- Time zone: UTC+01:00 (CET)
  - Summer (DST): UTC+02:00 (CEST)
- Postal codes: 63549
- Dialling codes: 06184, 06048 (Alt-/Neuwiedermuß)
- Vehicle registration: MKK
- Website: www.ronneburg.eu

Ronneburg (German: [ˈʁɔnəbʊʁk]) is both a castle and a municipality in the district of Main-Kinzig, in Hessen, Germany. The town is most notable for being the site of Ronneburg castle.

== Geography ==
The town is built near a steep basalt cone, on top of which a castle was built in the 13th century. Because of this, the area is called the "Ronneburger Hügelland," the "Ronneburg Hill Country." The castle, and the hill its sits on top of, can be seen in the town's coat of arms. The municipality consists of three villages: Neuwiedermuß (pop. 650), Altwiedermus (pop. 750), and Hüttengesäß (pop. 2200).

== Neighboring cities ==
On the north, Ronneburg borders the city of Büdingen, and on the east, Ronneburg borders the municipality of Gründau, which comprises several towns. On its southern side, Ronneburg borders the town of Langenselbold, and in the west the town borders the municipality of Hammersbach.

== History of the villages ==
Hüttengesäß first appears in historical records during the 13th century under the control of the monastery of Sebold. In later times possession of Hüttengesäß passed with the castle. In 1643 Wiedermus suffered destruction at the same time the castle was sacked (see below) and was later rebuilt. The three villages have different endings to their names because in the past they had been divided among Prussia (Neuwiedermuß and Hüttengesäß) and the Grand Duchy of Hesse (Altwiedermus) which had different spelling conventions.

== History of the castle ==
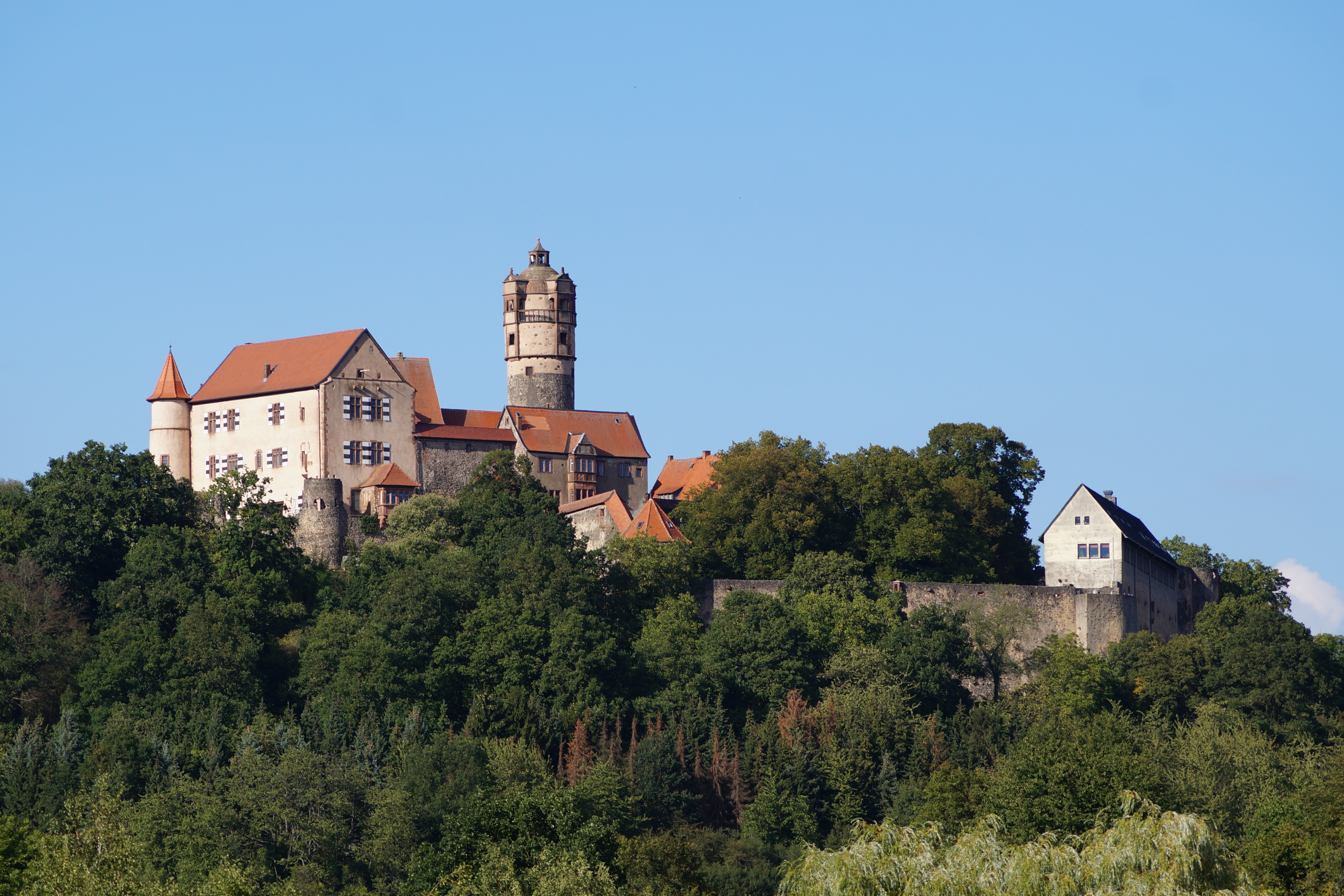
The Ronneburg Castle

The castle and the surrounding town were first mentioned in a historical context in the year 1258, and other sources may refer to it as early as 1231. The castle's earlier names, Raneburg, and also Roneburg, likely derive from the old High German word "Rone," which means a fallen tree. This is likely a reference to the castle's attached palisades.

At the end of the 13th century, the castle was acquired by the Barons of Ysenberg-Büdingen, who were affiliated with the Hohenlohe family. One of the members of the Hohenlohe family, Gottfried III of Hohenlohe-Brauneck, sold the castle in 1313, to the archbishop of Mainz. The castle was mortgaged to the knights of Rockenburg, under whose influence the castle was expanded. Then, from 1339 until 1356, the castle was again a possession of the archbishopric of Mainz. During this time, several buildings at the castle were expanded, and a few new buildings were built as well. The castle was mortgaged again in 1424, this time to the count of Hanau.

In 1476, the archbishop of Mainz, Diether von Ysenburg, signed possession of the castle over to his brother, count Ludwig II of Ysenburg-Büdingen. After Ludwig died in 1511, his three sons fought over the castle for six years, until 1517. In 1523, the castle came into possession of Philipp von Ysenburg-Büdingen, and he founded the Ysenberg-Büdingen-Ronneburg family, later called simply the Ysingen-Ronneburg family. Under their rule, the castle took on its present-day form and layout. After the death of Heinrich Ysingen-Büdingen, the Ysingen-Büdingen line became extinct, and Wolfgang Ernst I von Ysenburg-Büdingen violently assumed ownership of the castle. In 1621, large parts of the castle were destroyed by a fire, and thirteen years later, the castle suffered a major plundering at the hands of Croatian troops.

As the Ysenburg-Büdingen family were Calvinists, they allowed Protestant exiles to stay at the castle, and for a while, the castle was a haven for many other types of religious refugees, such as Jews and Gypsies. In 1736 Nicolaus Ludwig Zinzendorf took over the castle, and made it into a place of refuge for members of the Protestant Moravian Church. After two years, the castle could not accommodate the number of people who came to see it, and the Moravians founded another congregation, Herrnhaag, on top of a nearby hill near Buedingen.

In June 2004 the castle was sold by Prince Wolfgang Ernst II von Ysenburg-Büdingen to baron Joachim Benedikt von Herman auf Wain, a nephew of princess Leonille von Ysenburg-Büdingen. It hosts a restaurant, a gift shop, and regular medieval festivals. Visitors may tour the castle on a daily basis. The tower provides excellent views of the Frankfurt skyline.

== Sites of interest ==
- The city features a middle-ages themed market, which is especially popular around Christmastime.
- The castle features a museum, a restaurant, and a falconry center.
- A nearby museum features working Medieval catapults and other siege weapons.
- The basalt cones features many sites favorable for paragliding and other related activities.
