= Ronneburg Castle =

Castle in Hesse, Germany

- Burg Ronneburg
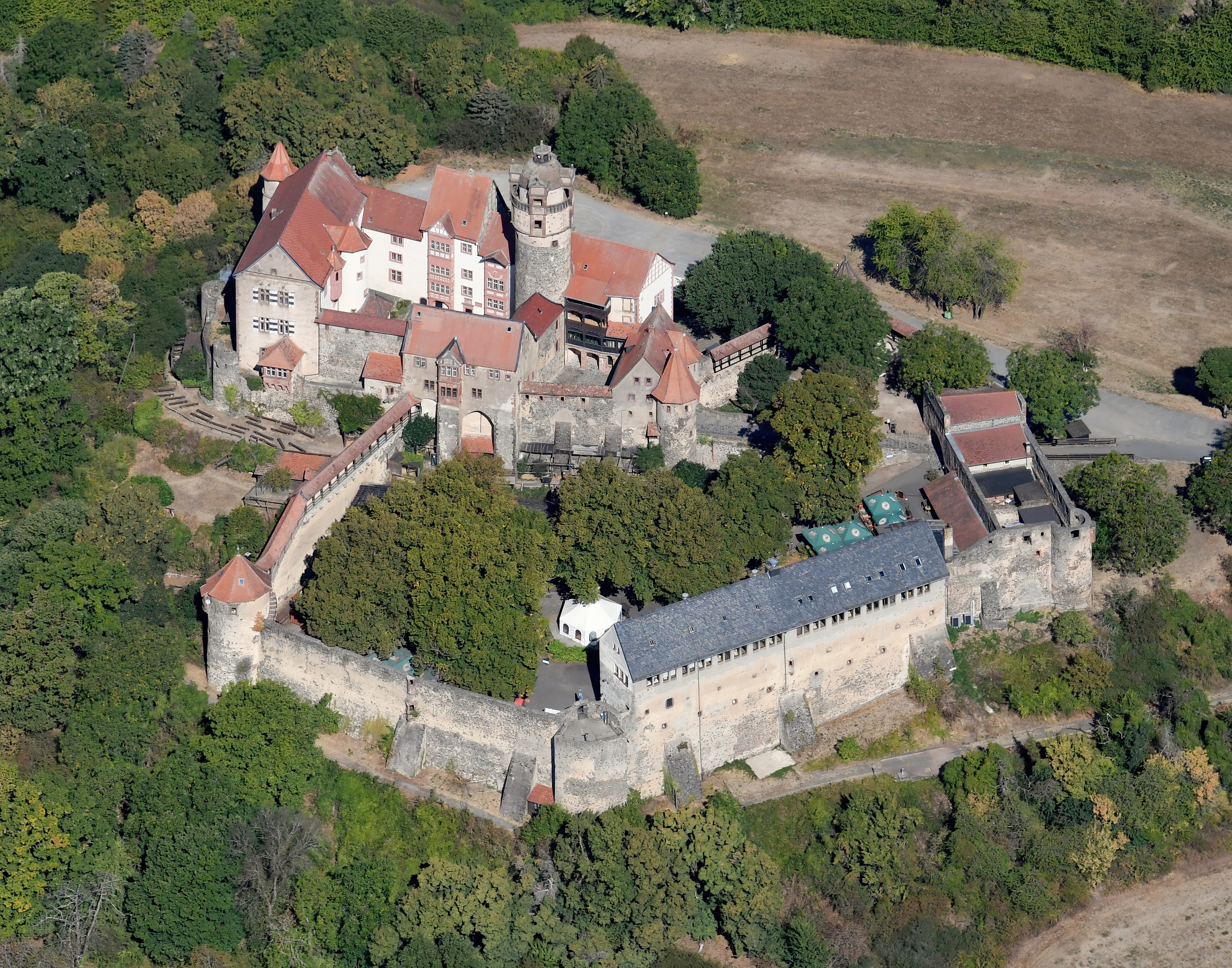
- Aerial view
- Interactive map of the Ronneburg Castle area
- Alternative names: Raneberg, Roneberg

General information
- Type: Hilltop castle
- Location: Ronneburg, Germany
- Coordinates: 50°14′N 9°4′E
- Elevation: 237 m (778 ft)

Ronneburg Castle (German: Burg Ronneburg) is a castle in Ronneburg in the Main-Kinzig district of Hesse, Germany. It is a hilltop castle situated near the near Altwiedermus village on a steep basalt cone. Its position makes it visible from afar. It lends its name to the Ronneburg hill country.

Originally founded in the 13th century as a Mainz castle to secure the territory, Ronneburg Castle came under the ownership of the Ysenburgs in 1476. Its greatest significance was in the 16th century when it served as the residence of the Ysenburg-Büdingen-Ronneburg collateral line. The castle showcases Renaissance architecture, including the distinctive domed helmet of the keep, the Zinzendorf Building, and the New Bower. During the Thirty Years' War, the core castle was substantially damaged by fire, and a few years later, it was plundered. Subsequently, Ronneburg Castle lost its role as a fortress and noble seat, becoming a refuge for social fringe groups like the Moravian Brethren. Its status as a historical monument was acknowledged around 1900. The well-preserved medieval and early modern castle buildings have since made it a popular regional excursion destination

== Location ==
The Ronneburg is situated to the east of the Ronneburger Hügelland, a distinct natural region named after the castle. This area is characterized by a flat landscape located between the Wetterau and the Büdinger Forest, gradually ascending towards the northeast in the direction of the Vogelsberg. The castle complex occupies the summit of a prominent basalt cone, approximately 237 meters above sea level, overlooking the Fallbach Valley, which lies around 160 meters above sea level. To the southwest of the castle, the valley opens into fertile farmland, while the eastern slope, known as Am Steinkopf, reaches a height of 269 meters above sea level and is covered in forest. Historically, significant trade routes, such as the Hohe Straße or Reffenstraße, traversed the valley, with the castle as a monitoring point.

== History ==
=== Foundation as a castle of the Electorate of Mainz ===
The earliest documented reference to the castle dates to either 1231 or 1258 when a Burgmann from the Rüdigheim family identified himself as "de Roneburg" after the castle. However, the fortification likely predates this mention. It is believed to have been built by the lords of Büdingen, possibly Gerlach I or Gerlach II, to secure the surrounding judicial districts, the Büdingen forest, and the trade routes that passed through the region. This construction possibly occurred during the period of the Staufer final battle in the Wetterau, preceding the death of Konrad IV. The earlier names 'Raneberg' and 'Roneberg' likely derive from the Old High German word Rone, which refers to a fallen tree, suggesting the presence of an even older fortified complex with palisades. Notably, the oldest surviving components of the present-day core castle date to the second quarter of the 14th century.

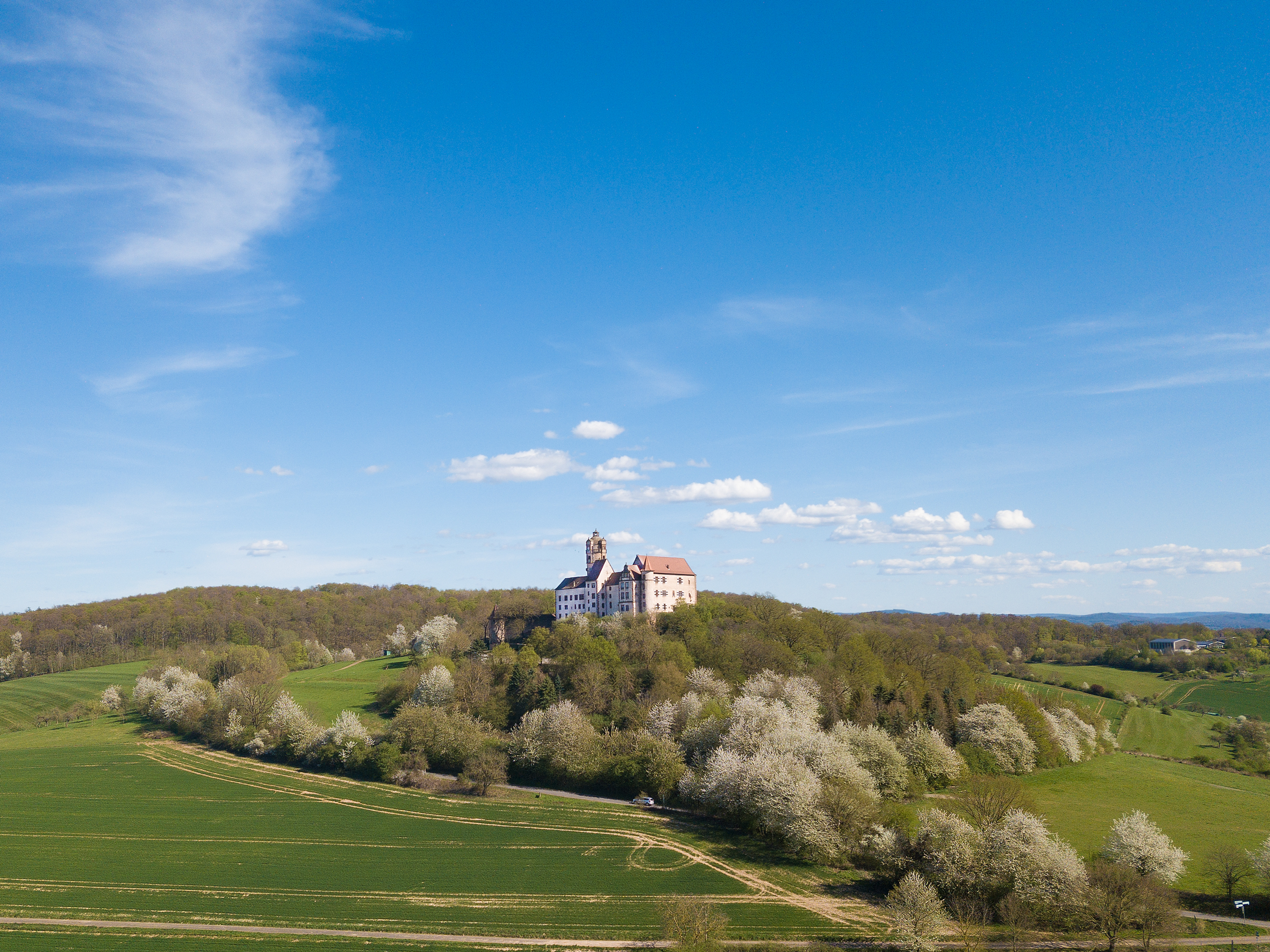
View from the west

Numerous indications suggest that Ronneburg Castle originally served as a territorial fortress for the Archbishopric of Mainz. The castle's location within the Mainzian court of Langendiebach allowed it to safeguard this territory, as well as the adjacent forested regions under Electoral-Mainzian jurisdiction along the lower Kinzig River. Notably, other Mainzian possessions, such as Gelnhausen (held until 1170) and Bulau (held until 1277), further underlined the importance of Ronneburg's role. After the extinction of the Büdingen family, who previously held the castle (before 1247), Ronneburg Castle did not immediately pass to their primary heirs, the Counts of Ysenburg. Instead, it was briefly under the ownership of the von Hohenlohe family when first mentioned. It was subsequently sold to the Archbishopric of Mainz in 1313 by Gottfried III of Hohenlohe-Brauneck.

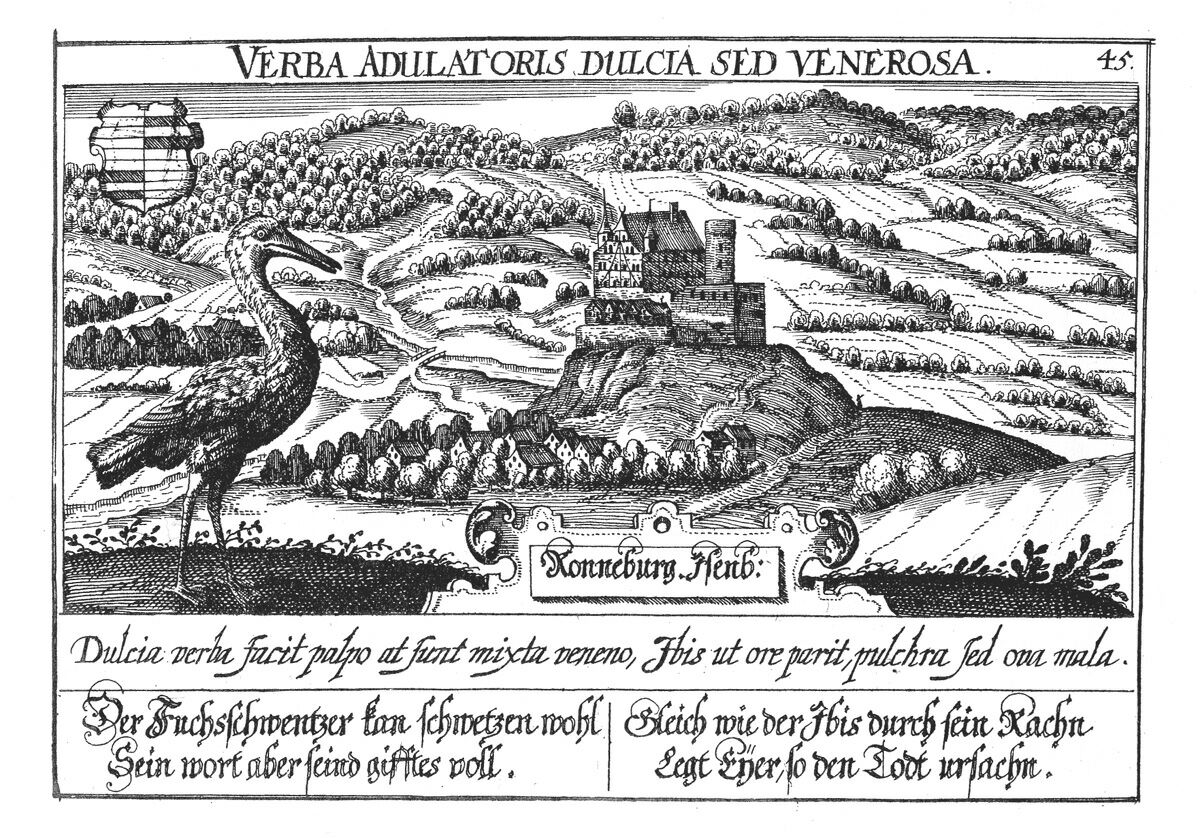
View of the Ronneburg in Hesse (probably based on an older model) after D. Meisner/E. Kieser, Thesaurus Philopoliticus or Political Treasure Chest Vol. 2, facsimile reprint of the Frankfurt/Main edition 1625-1626 and 1627-1631, Nördlingen 1992, Book 7, No. 45

The castle was pledged to the Knights of Rockenberg in 1327, leading to significant expansions. Between 1339 and 1356, it once again fell under the administration of the Archbishopric. In 1356, Ronneburg Castle was pledged to the Lords of Cronberg, specifically Hartmut VI and Frank VIII of Cronberg. They had provided considerable financial assistance to Archbishop Gerlach of Nassau and, in return, received the castle as collateral for 18,000 small gold florins. The Cronbergs retained ownership of Ronneburg until 1407, during which time they carried out further enhancements, including the construction of the chapel bay window in the hall building. Starting in 1424, the castle entered another period of pledging, this time under the control of the Counts of Hanau.

=== Ysenburg Castle and residence ===
In 1476, during a tumultuous period marked by the Mainz Collegiate Feud, the Archbishop of Mainz, Diether of Ysenburg, transferred control of the castle to his brother, Count Ludwig II of Ysenburg-Büdingen. However, upon Ludwig's passing in 1511, a succession conflict erupted among his three sons, plunging the Büdingen region into a state of unrest starting in 1517. It was not until 1523 that the castle came under the possession of Philipp von Ysenburg-Büdingen, who laid the foundation for the Ysenburg-Büdingen-Ronneburg lineage. Under Philipp's stewardship, Ronneburg Castle underwent significant developments and acquired its enduring architectural form.

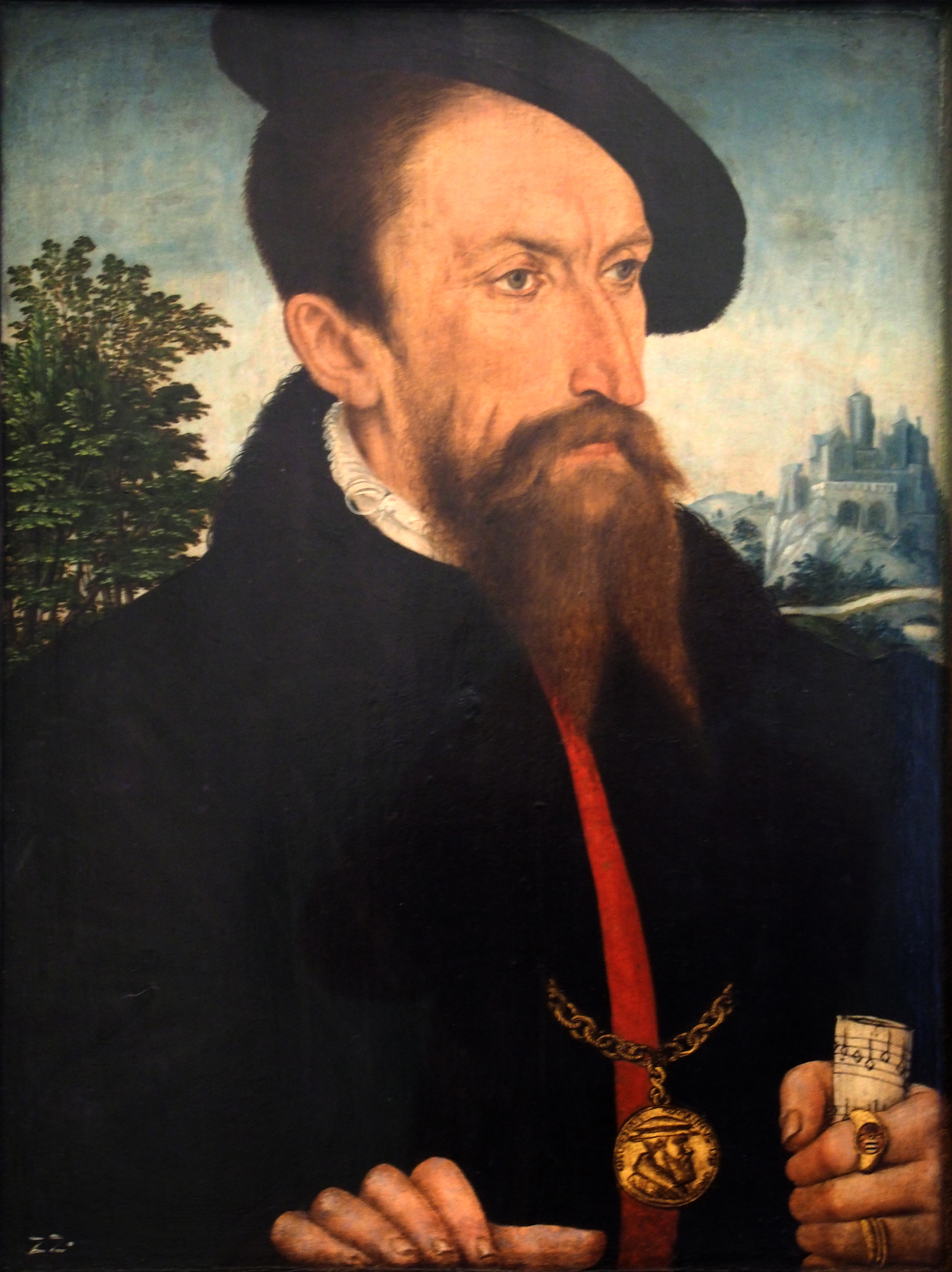
Abel, Anton von Ysenburg at Weimar Castle Museum

Philip of Isenburg-Ronneburg was succeeded by his son, Anton, who had a total of 15 children. However, despite the marriages of Anton's sons, they remained childless. The brothers Georg and Heinrich ruled successively. After the construction of Kelsterbach Castle by Anton's third son, Wolfgang of Ysenburg-Ronneburg, they were mentioned several times as Counts of Isenburg-Büdingen-Kelsterbach. With the remodeling by Count Heinrich, Ronneburg Castle had a last flourishing period.

Following the passing of Heinrich of Ysenburg-Ronneburg in 1601, the lineage once again faced extinction. Wolfgang Ernst I of Ysenburg-Büdingen in Birstein asserted his inheritance rights and forcefully assumed control of the castle as a reverted fief. Nevertheless, the castle continued to serve as the residence for Heinrich's widow during the subsequent period.

=== Ronneburg in modern times ===
In a fire caused by the carelessness of the burgrave, large parts of the castle were destroyed in 1621, including the New Bower and the Upper Gate Building. This incident marked the conclusion of its role as a dowager's residence. Thirteen years later, the largely damaged and vacant Ronneburg faced looting by Croatian cavalry troops amid the turmoil of the Thirty Years' War. Restoration efforts did not commence until after the war's conclusion, though the New Bower was not fully restored to its original height.

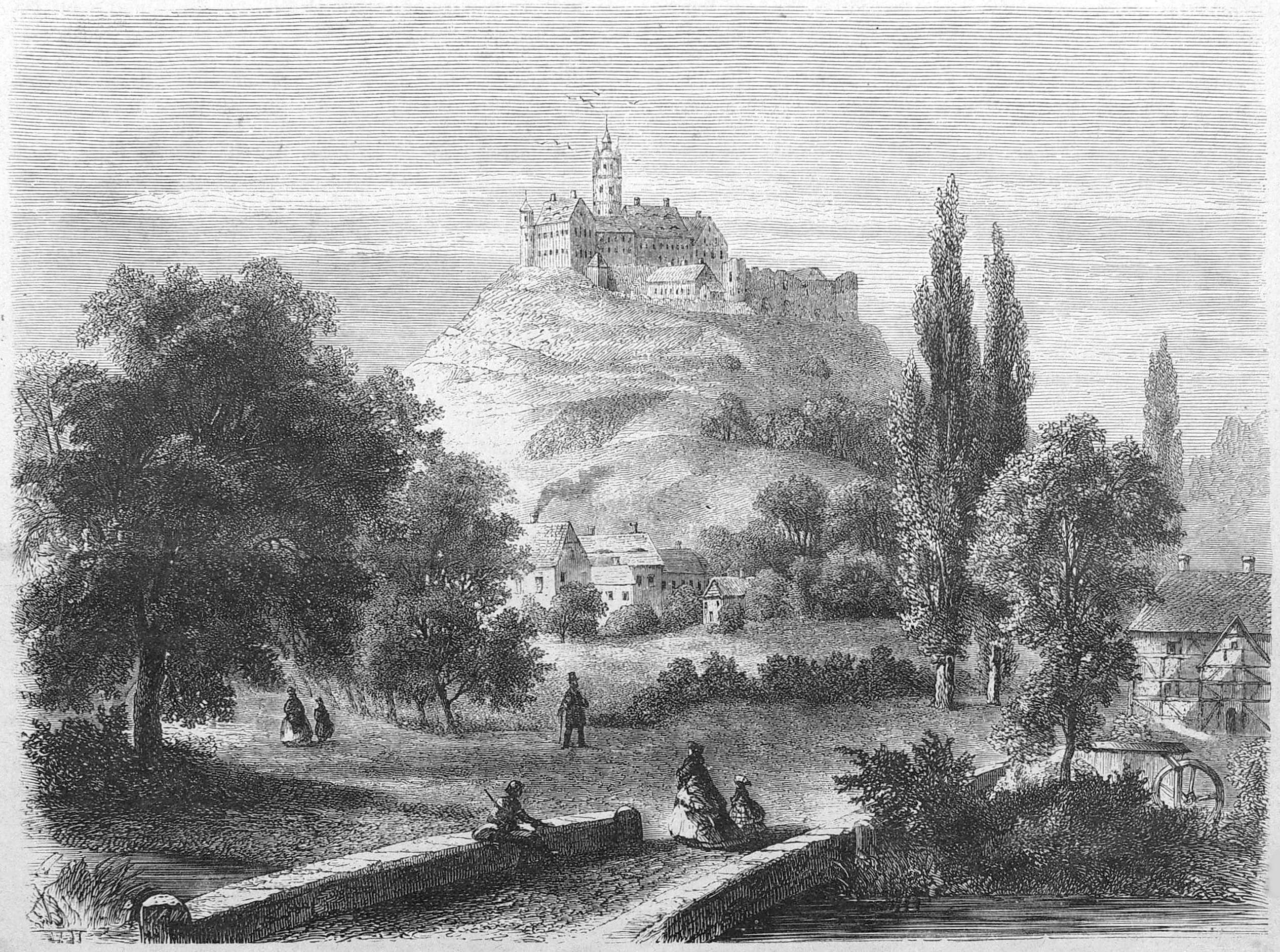
The Ronneburg before 1867, illustration from Die Gartenlaube

Ronneburg ceased to serve as the official seat of the former Langendiebach court, later known as the Ysenburg office of Ronneburg, at the close of the 17th century. It was sold by the Isenburg-Birstein line to Isenburg-Büdingen. The office had already been extended by the court of Selbold in 1645, whose administrative seat was finally elevated to Langenselbold in 1698.

The Calvinist Ysenburg-Büdingen played a crucial role in permitting Protestant exiles to take up residence in the castle starting in 1700. It became a long-standing sanctuary for those facing religious persecution, with notable figures such as the Swiss mystic Ursula Meyer engaging in 156 debates here between 1715 and 1719. It also offered refuge to unhoused people, including Jews and Gypsies, who engaged in various craft activities within the castle's rooms. By the late 18th century, a woolen goods manufactory operated within the castle's premises. In 1736, Count von Zinzendorf and his Herrnhut Brethren community moved in, transforming the castle into a widely visited place of pilgrimage. Just two years later, they found the site too cramped for their needs, leading to the establishment of the Herrnhaag settlement on a nearby hill. Starting in 1750, many of these settlers emigrated to America and other countries.

Over time, Ronneburg continued to be occupied by various marginalized groups under different landlords. The substantial population living there led to the castle becoming an independent municipality in 1821 during an administrative reform but without its parish. However, this status was reversed as early as 1829. As the buildings began to deteriorate due to storm damage, the number of residents decreased in the mid-19th century. In 1838, the outer castle structures were demolished, a move seemingly encouraged by the authorities due to the undesirable inhabitants. The sale of the demolition materials was likely an attempt to compensate for declining rental income. Additional demolition sales occurred in 1870, but it was not until 1885 that the last occupant left the castle.

During this period, the emerging monument preservation movement in Hesse began to recognize the site, primarily through the volume on the art monuments of the Büdingen district authored by Heinrich Wagner in 1890. Its prominence increased in the following years due to visits from youth movements and hiking clubs from neighboring towns. In 1905, Ronneburg Castle received official monument protection for the first time. Peter Nieß (1895-1965), an architect and historian from Büdingen, played a significant role in preserving and researching the building's history, presenting a comprehensive architectural history in 1936. The Ysenburg Princely House, under Friedrich Wilhelm of Ysenburg and Büdingen and his successor Otto Friedrich of Ysenburg and Büdingen, actively supported this effort. In 1952, the castle museum was opened, and in 1967, a restaurant was established in the Marstall. The structural and museum care was formally arranged in 1988 through a sponsorship agreement between the owner and the Förderkreis Freunde der Ronneburg e. V.

In June 2004, Wolfgang Ernst zu Ysenburg und Büdingen sold Ronneburg to Forfin GmbH, whose managing director and sole shareholder, Joachim Benedikt Freiherr von Herman auf Wain, is a cousin of his wife.

== Attachment ==
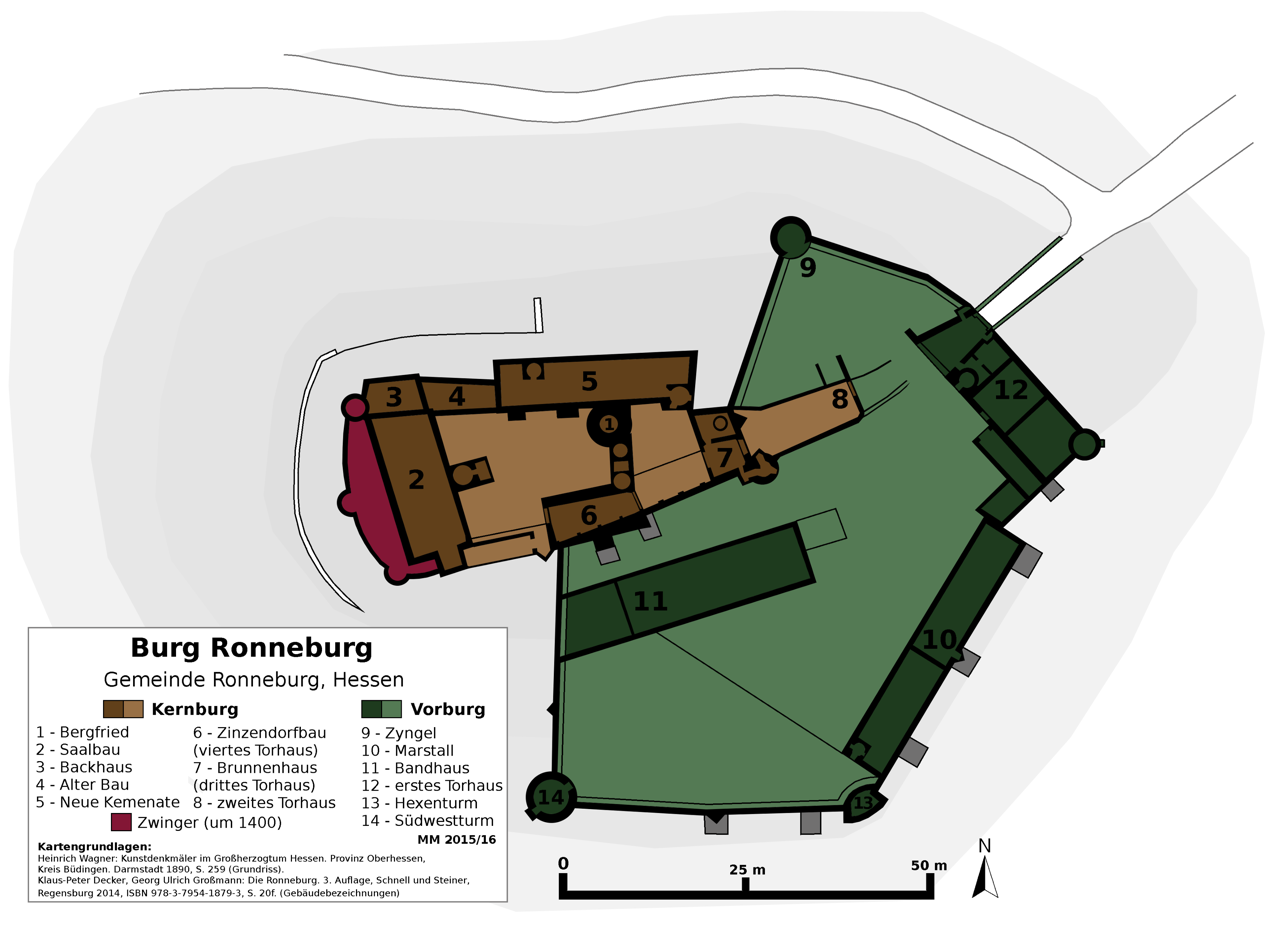
Floor plan of the castle

The ground plan of Ronneburg reveals the rectangular core castle with its robust defensive wall. Together with the keep and the hall building, it is the oldest part of the castle dating from the second quarter of the 14th century. The extensive outer bailey located to the south and east of the complex is a product of a later construction phase, spanning from 1538 to 1550.

=== Core castle ===
The core castle of Ronneburg encompasses the oldest structures within the castle. The defensive wall of the core castle, constructed using quarry stones, lacks Romanesque elements and is believed to have been built in the second quarter of the 14th century. This wall encircled the rectangular core castle. To the west, it was reinforced by the hall building in the initial construction phase, while to the east, it was fortified by the keep and the uppermost gate, all of which are part of this early construction phase.

During the late 14th century, the hall building underwent renovations, including the addition of a chapel bay. In this period, it was enclosed by a kennel, and the gate near the future well house was built. Another phase of construction in the 15th century expanded the core castle to the north, resulting in the buildings of the north wing (Backhouse, Old building, and New bower) standing within the former moat. The Old building integrated the northern defensive wall as a courtyard façade, and the building was extended externally.

The most significant renovations within the core castle occurred during its use as a residence in the Renaissance period, particularly around 1540. Additional reconstructions took place around 1570 (New Residential Building, Zinzendorf Building) and from 1576 (helmet of the keep).

=== Keep ===
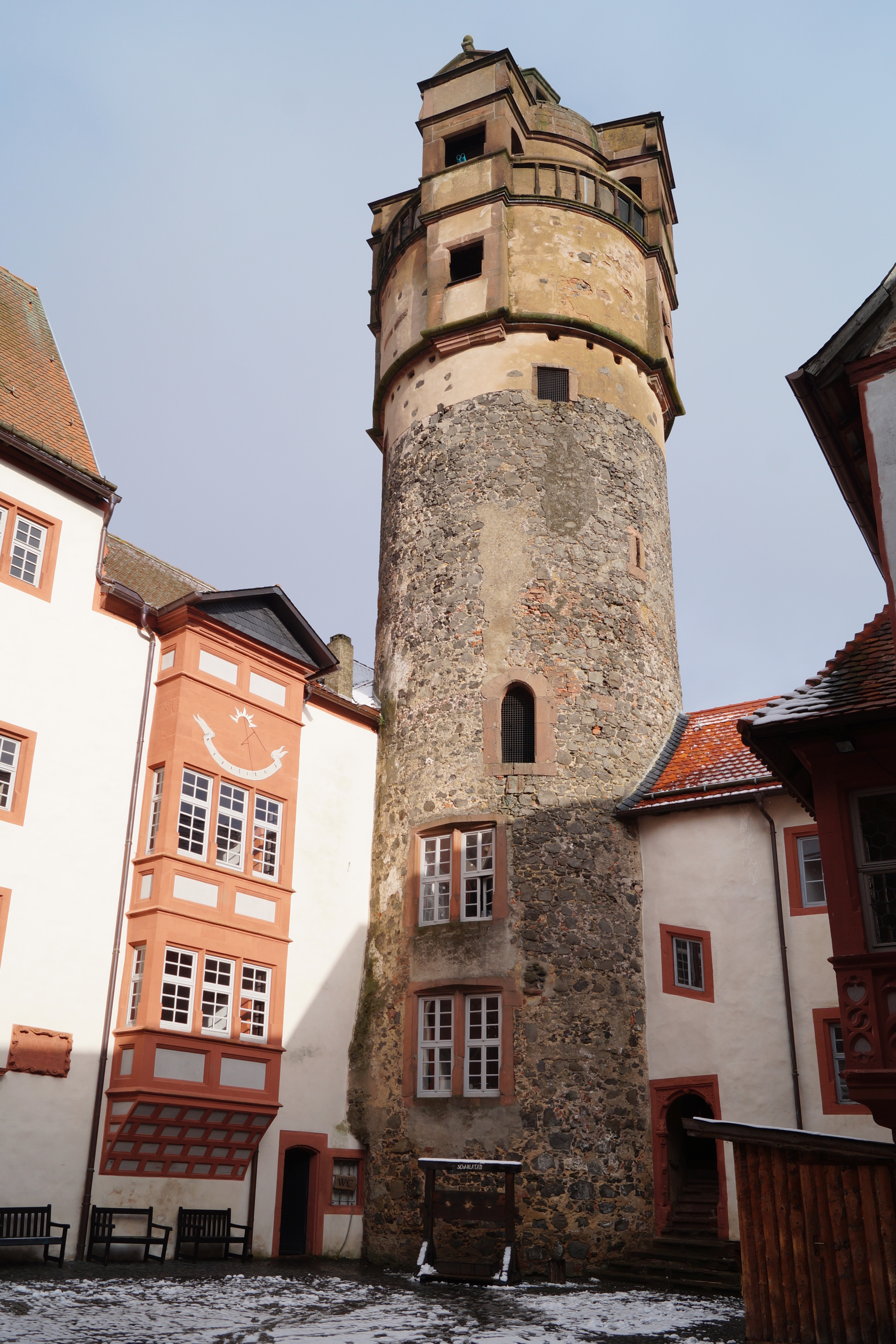
Keep

The keep, standing at a height of 32 meters, features a round ground plan with a diameter slightly exceeding eight meters. Its masonry, which is consistent up to the helmet, is believed to belong to the earliest construction phase. In the thinner masonry of the spacious hall on the fourth floor, the remains of a staircase embedded in the wall indicate its connection to the Renaissance-era helmet. The original entrance can be observed on the courtyard side on the third floor, situated at a height of about ten meters, as a pointed arched gate. The two floors below served as dungeons and were only accessible from above via a fear hole in the vault. The current windows were installed in 1581, requiring the wall to be broken through for their installation when it was intended to use these floors for residential purposes as well. In the 15th century, a new lateral access had already been created through an attached stair tower with a spiral staircase. Consequently, the 57-step spiral staircase within the keep only commences on the third floor and starts above a three-armed arch, likely because the original hole to the dungeon was not yet covered.

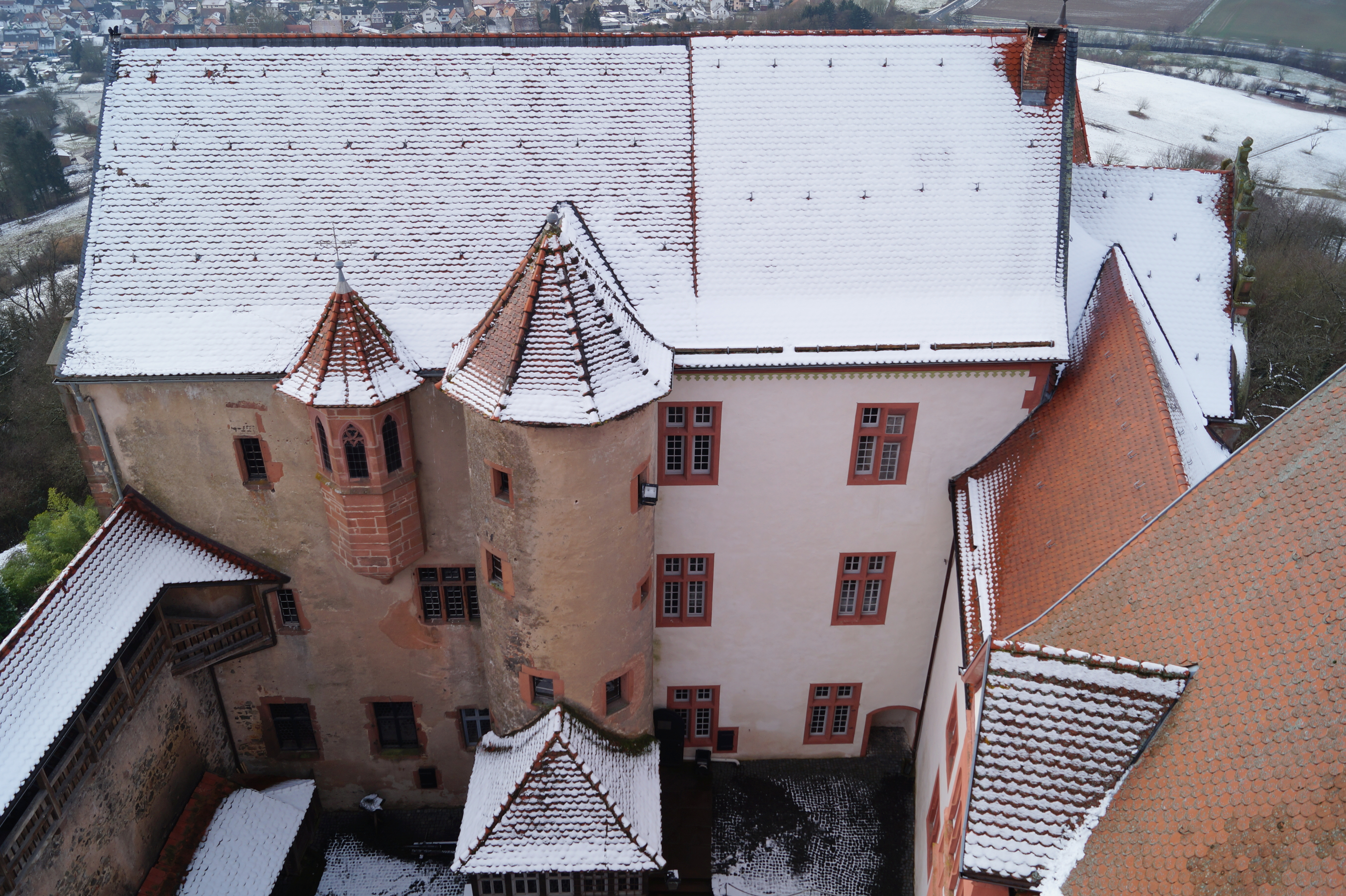
View of the hall building (palas) of the Ronneburg from the keep

The castle's distinctive Renaissance helmet, built between 1576 and 1581, was designed by master builder Joris Robin from Ypres. Above the closed fifth floor, there is a gallery at a height of 25 meters with a balustrade. The gallery is interrupted in the four main directions by a porch with small gables through which it passes. Today, the two top floors are accessible via a wooden staircase. The dome above, made of ashlars, ends in a lantern. The Renaissance helmet of the Ronneburg keep is inspired by Italian cupola lanterns of the time, making it one of the most remarkable examples of Renaissance architecture in Hesse.

=== Hall building (Saalbau) ===
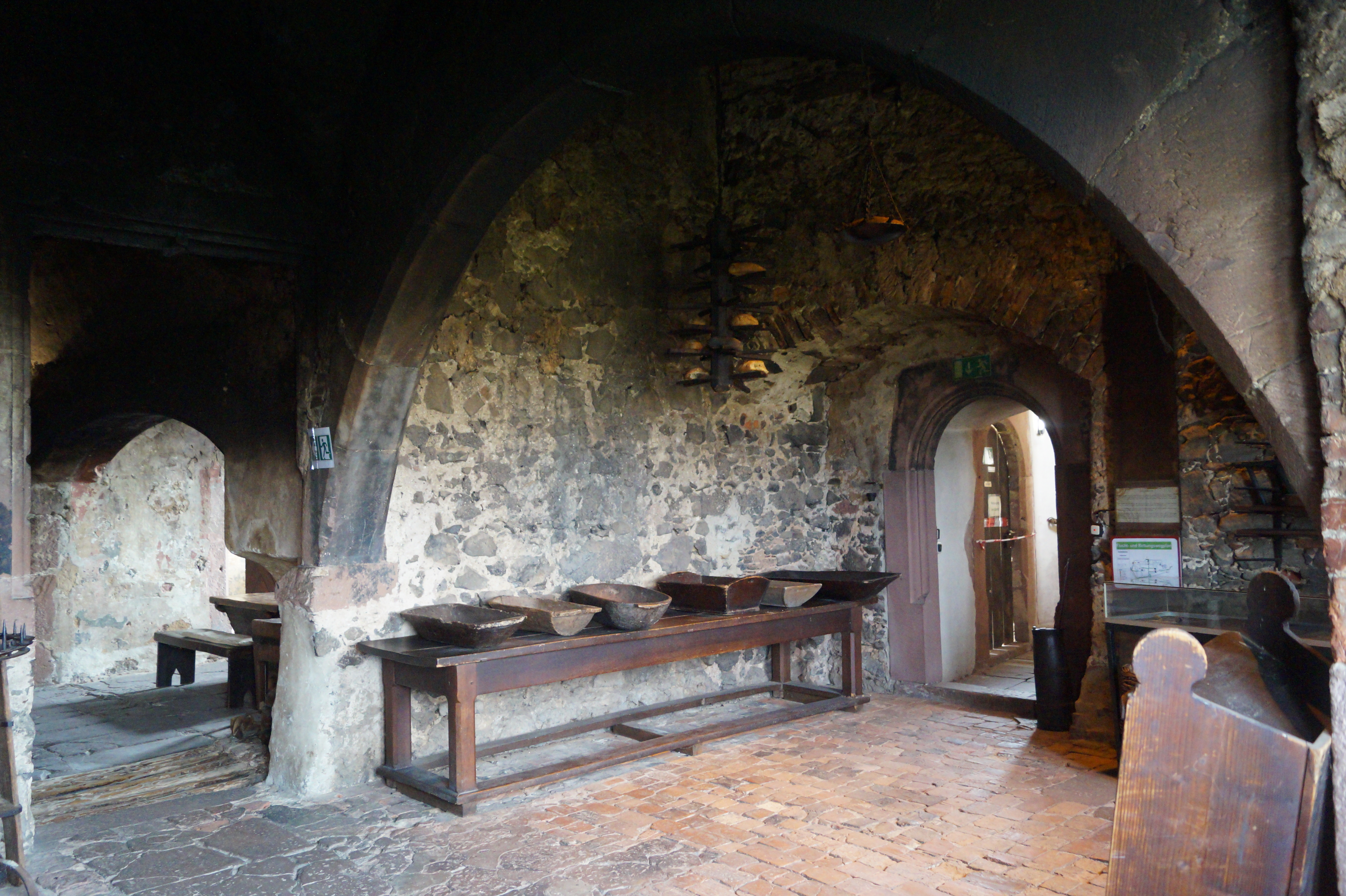
Interior

The Saalbau, also known as the Palas, is situated on the west side of the core castle and is essentially one of the original castle buildings. The current structure has a floor area of 25 x 11.5 meters and spans the entire width of the western core castle. On its south side, it seamlessly connects to the battlement of the upper gate building. The central stair tower in front of the building above the cellar neck is an addition from the 15th century. The roofing over the cellar entrance, featuring a half-timbered parlor, dates to 1555. On the courtyard-side facade, there is a polygonal bay window made of sandstone ashlars with cross-frame windows to the left of the stair tower on the upper floor. This bay window was created in the last third of the 14th century when a Gothic chapel was built there, of which it formed the apse. The building houses a vaulted cellar, as well as larger living and courtrooms. It also contains a castle kitchen, which, however, was only installed during the Renaissance. In the past, the first floor featured a larger hall, which was later converted into a smaller hall with a kitchen. Half-timbered walls from the 15th century are still preserved on the middle floor. The upper floor had to be extensively rebuilt after the fire damage of 1621, so medieval elements are present only in the stone architectural components.

=== Castle chapel in the hall building ===
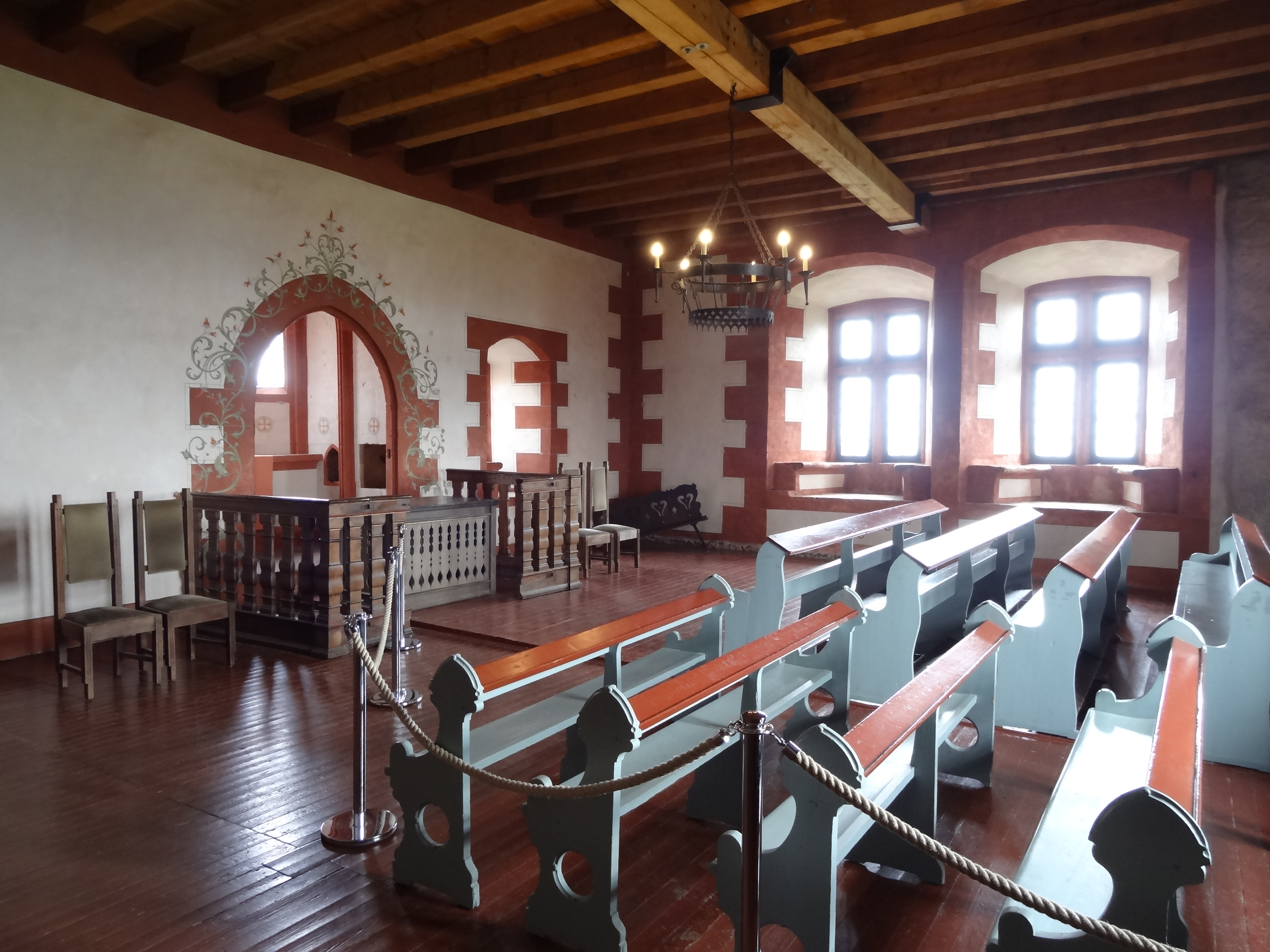
View of today's castle chapel on the upper floor of the hall building

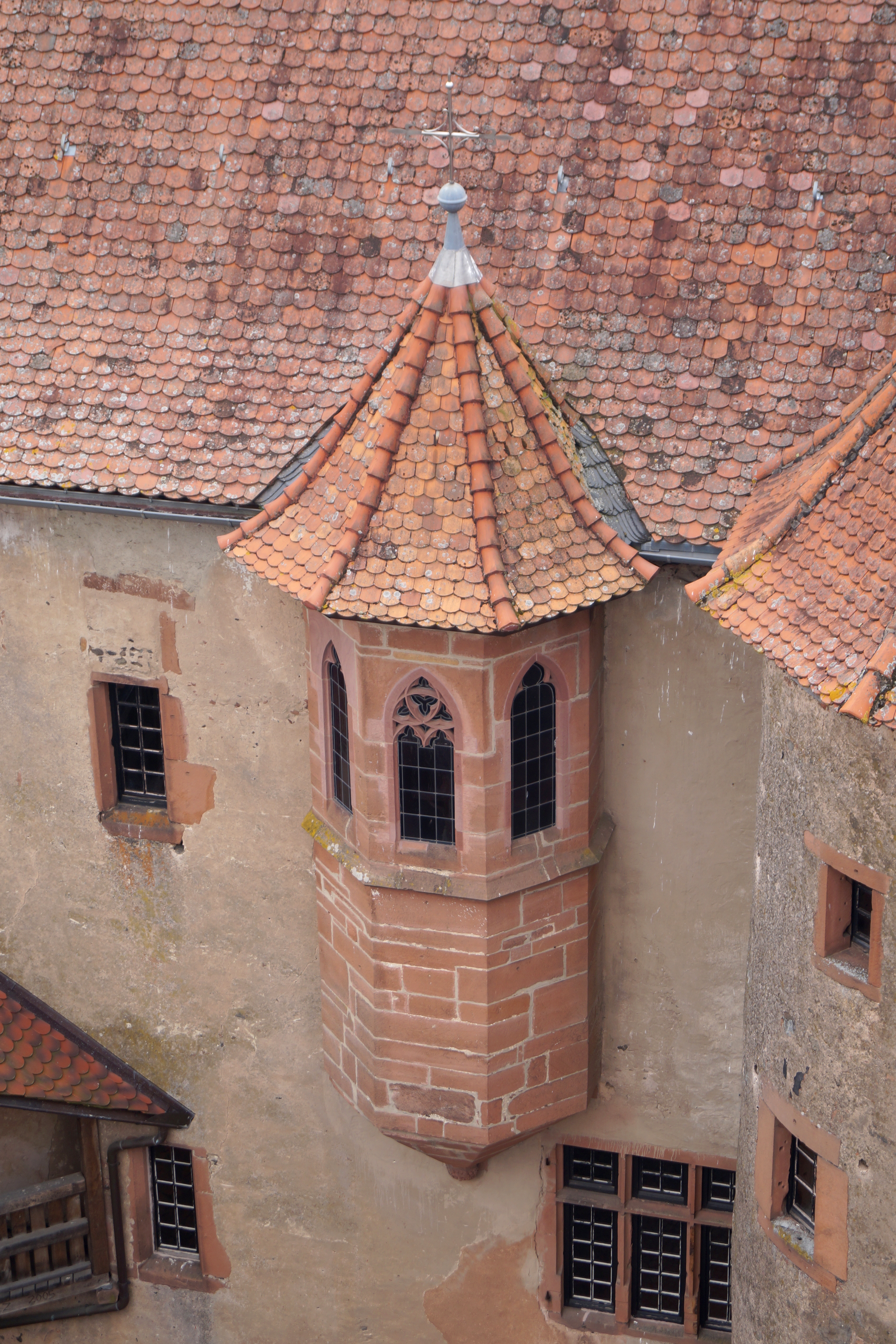
Detailed view of the chapel bay window

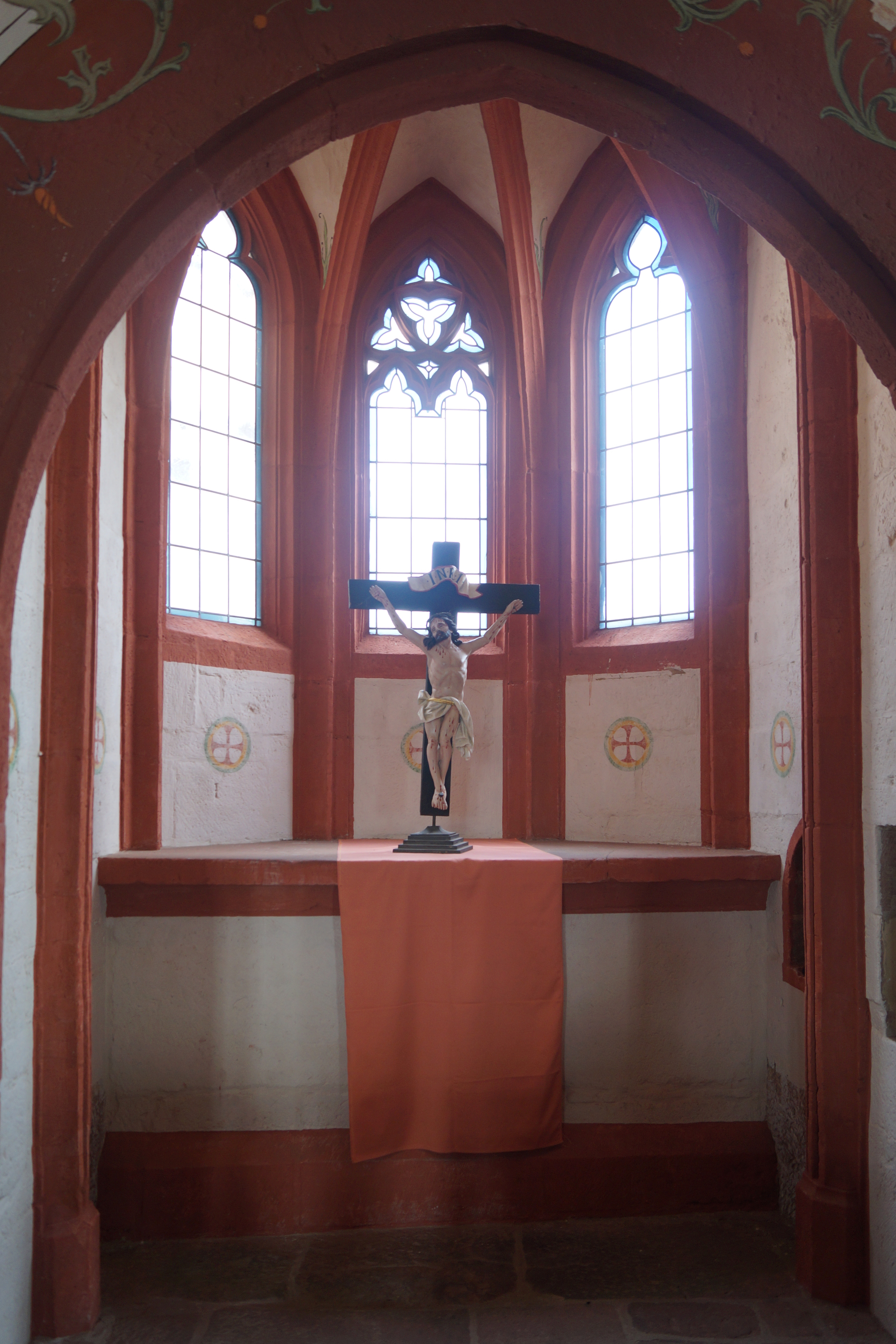
Inside view

=== Bakehouse ===
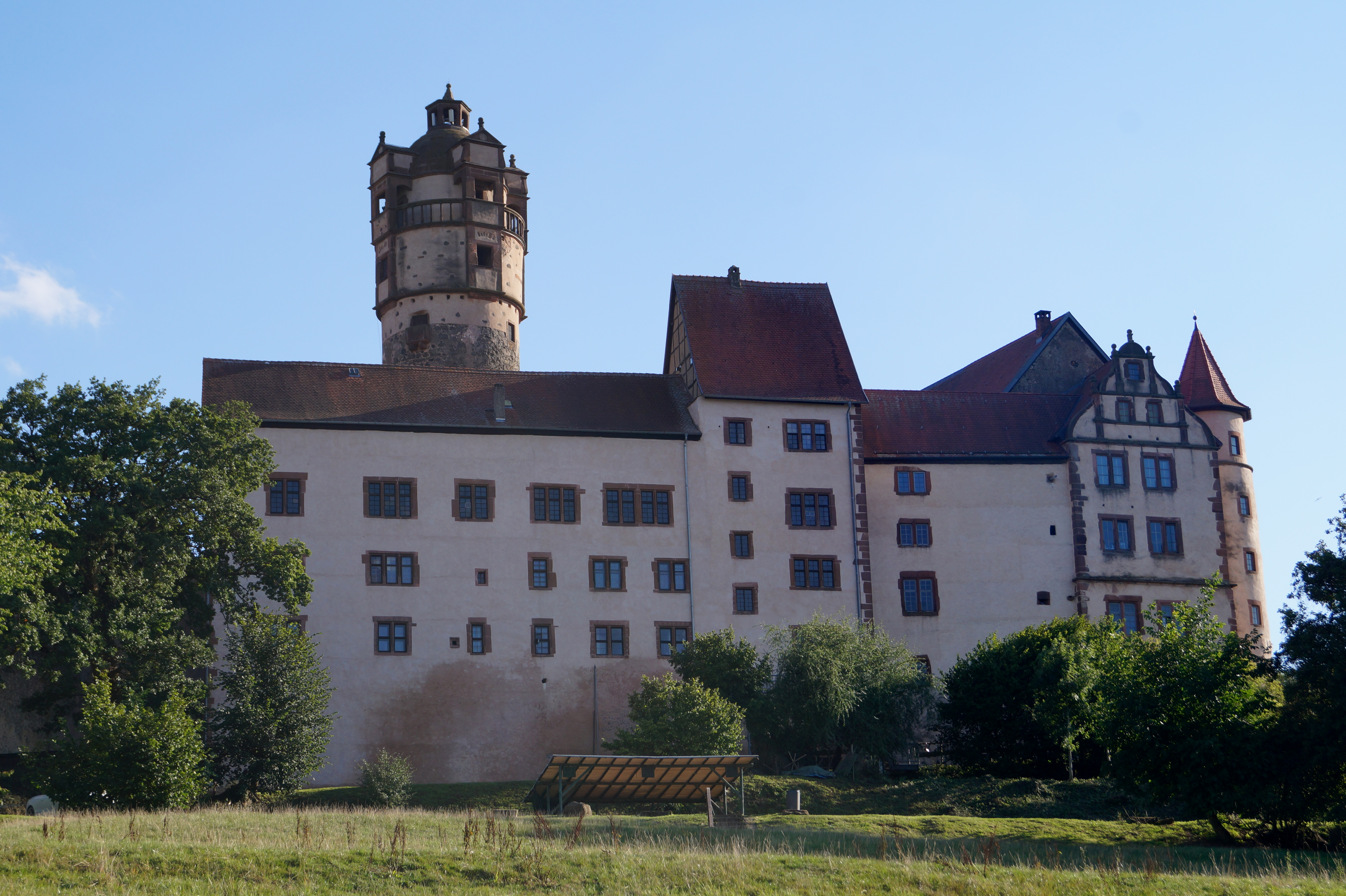
Northern outside of the core castle (from left to right): New bower (under the keep), old building and bakery with Renaissance gable and stair tower

Directly north of the hall building, in the corner between it and the old building, one can find the bakehouse. It has an impressive Renaissance gable on the exterior and dates to the 16th century. The shell tower of the late medieval Zwinger, which is directly adjacent to the outer corner, was extended to serve as a stair tower during the building's expansion.

=== Old building ===
The Old Building occupies the space between the bay window of the New Bower to the east, the Hall Building, and the Bakehouse. The core of the building likely dates back to the 15th century. A portal on the courtyard side displays the date 1572. On the courtyard side, there are only three Renaissance windows, which were likely added at a later date. On the field side, with presumably older masonry, one can see a covered embrasure from the mid-16th century, as well as a bricked-up light niche for a privy.

=== New bowers ===
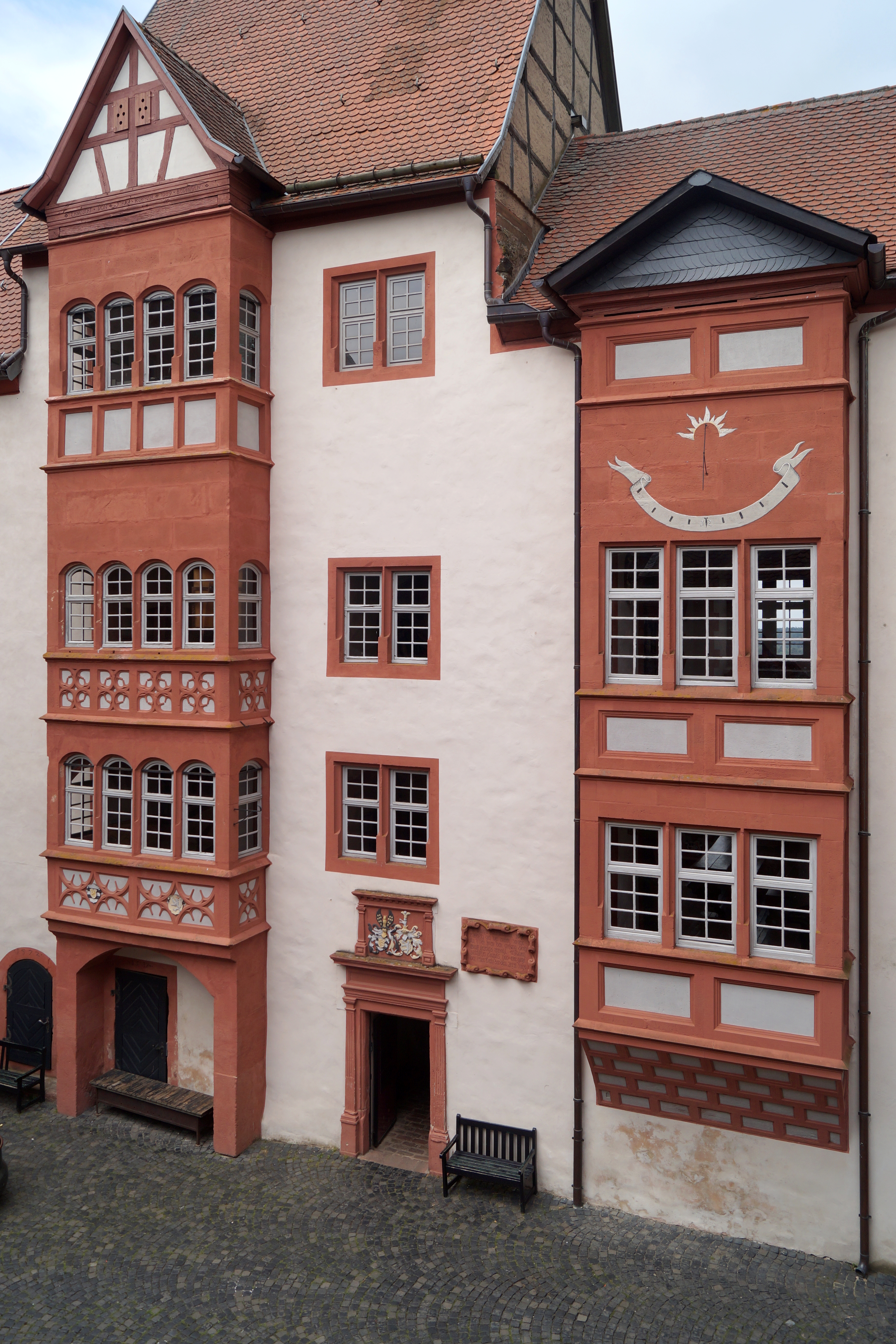
On the courtyard side, the facade of the new bower is representatively designed with the two bay windows that are valuable in terms of art history.

With the marriage of Count Heinrich von Ysenburg-Ronneburg and Countess Elisabeth von Gleichen-Tonna in 1572, Ronneburg Castle no longer met the representative and residential requirements of a count's residence. The couple, therefore, had the New Bower (more rarely: New Residential Building) built on the northeast side of the core castle starting in 1573. On the courtyard side, the building contains the 14th-century defensive wall with recognizably very thick masonry and, under the left bay window, a portal from 1537 leading into the pharmacy.

The stately four-story building is 32.5 meters long and is just under nine meters wide. The courtyard-side facade is divided by two high oriels, one of which is a stander bay. On the left oriel, the blind tracery on the two main floors and the coats of arms of the builders in the basement are conspicuous. On the right oriel, there are mirrored ashlars carefully decorated with a checkerboard pattern. They represent an outstanding example of Renaissance stonemasonry. Due to the fire of 1621, the top floor of the oriel, which today bears a sundial, is not original. Between the two oriels is the portal with the coat of arms of Ysenburg and von Gleichen, and next to it is the foundation stone with an inscription from 1573.

The New Bower contains, on the first floor, a pharmacy already mentioned in older inventories. The floors above, with the oriels, contain larger living quarters. On the second floor, these living quarters extend from the oriel on the courtyard side to the outer oriel. The room is spanned by two cross-ribbed vaults with floral motifs. The room on the second floor has the same dimensions but is decorated with elaborate figural murals (depicting Christophorus, David and Goliath, Solomon's Judgment, Cain and Abel). Between these predominantly Old Testament scenes is a Renaissance castle landscape based on printed 15th-century master sheets. Also, the wall inscription "FRID IST BESSER DENN KRIEG DIWEIL UNGEWIS IST DER SIG" (FRID IS BETTER THAN WAR BECAUSE THE SIG IS UNCERTAIN) holds particular significance.

The use of the individual floors is largely known from inventories: Count Heinrich's apartment was on the second floor and that of his wife and other relatives was on the second floor. Further living quarters were located on the third floor, which, however, has not been preserved in its original form due to the fire of 1621. Each floor had a privy at the transition to the Old Building. Each apartment consisted of a heated chamber and a sleeping chamber.

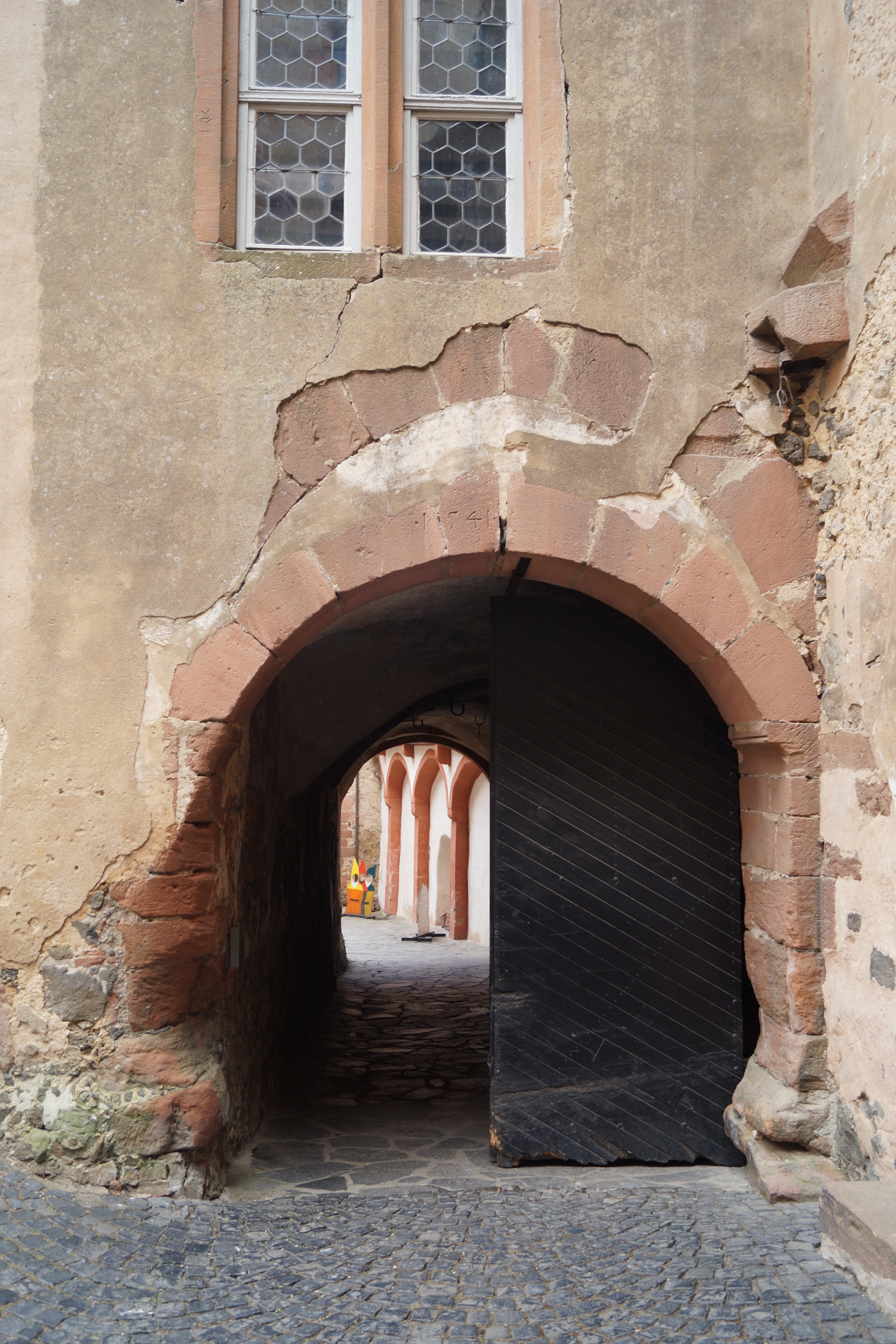
Inner archway of the fourth gatehouse with probably the oldest components of the castle

=== Interior views of the new bower ===
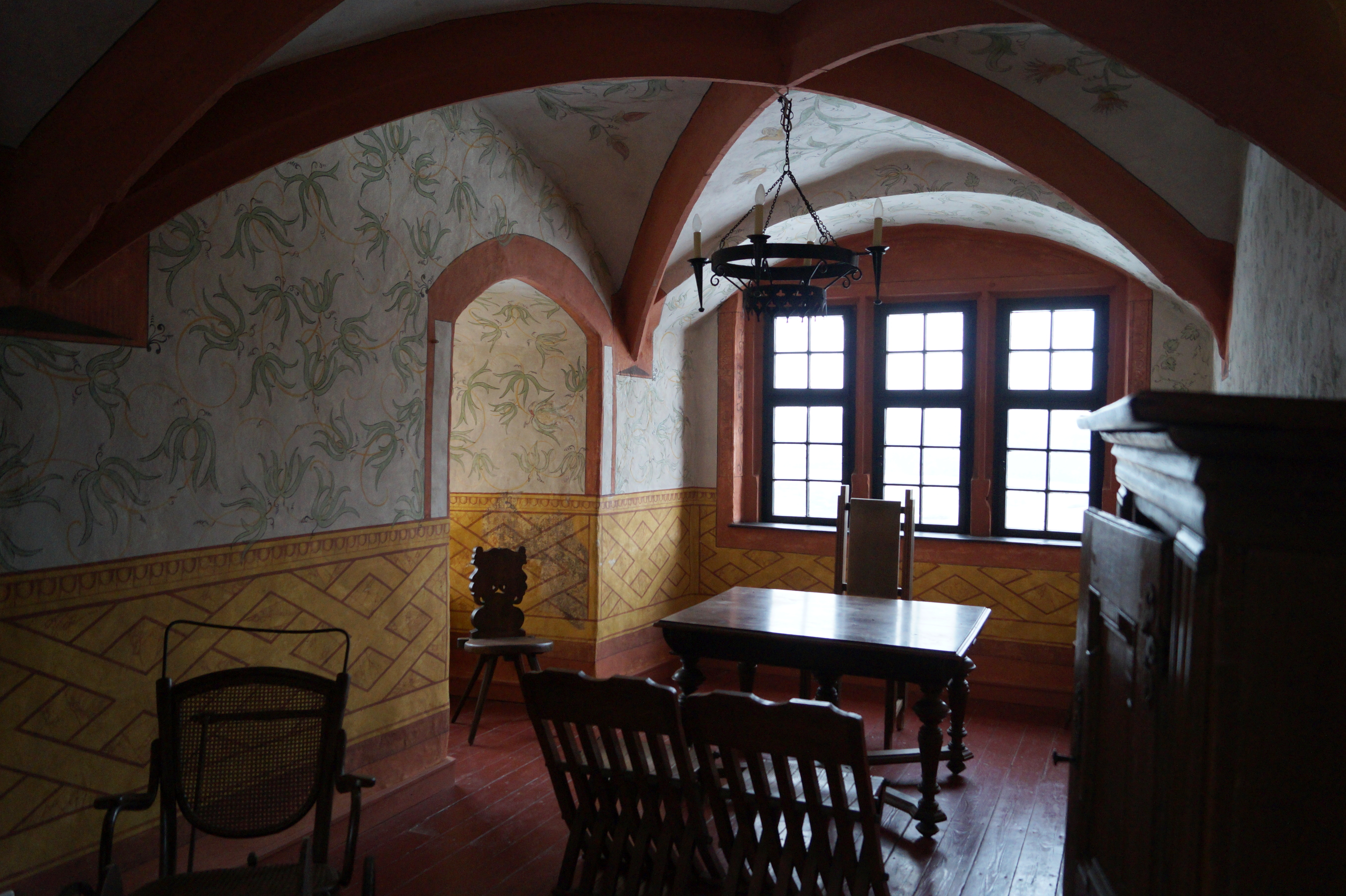
Middle men's room on the first floor of the new bower

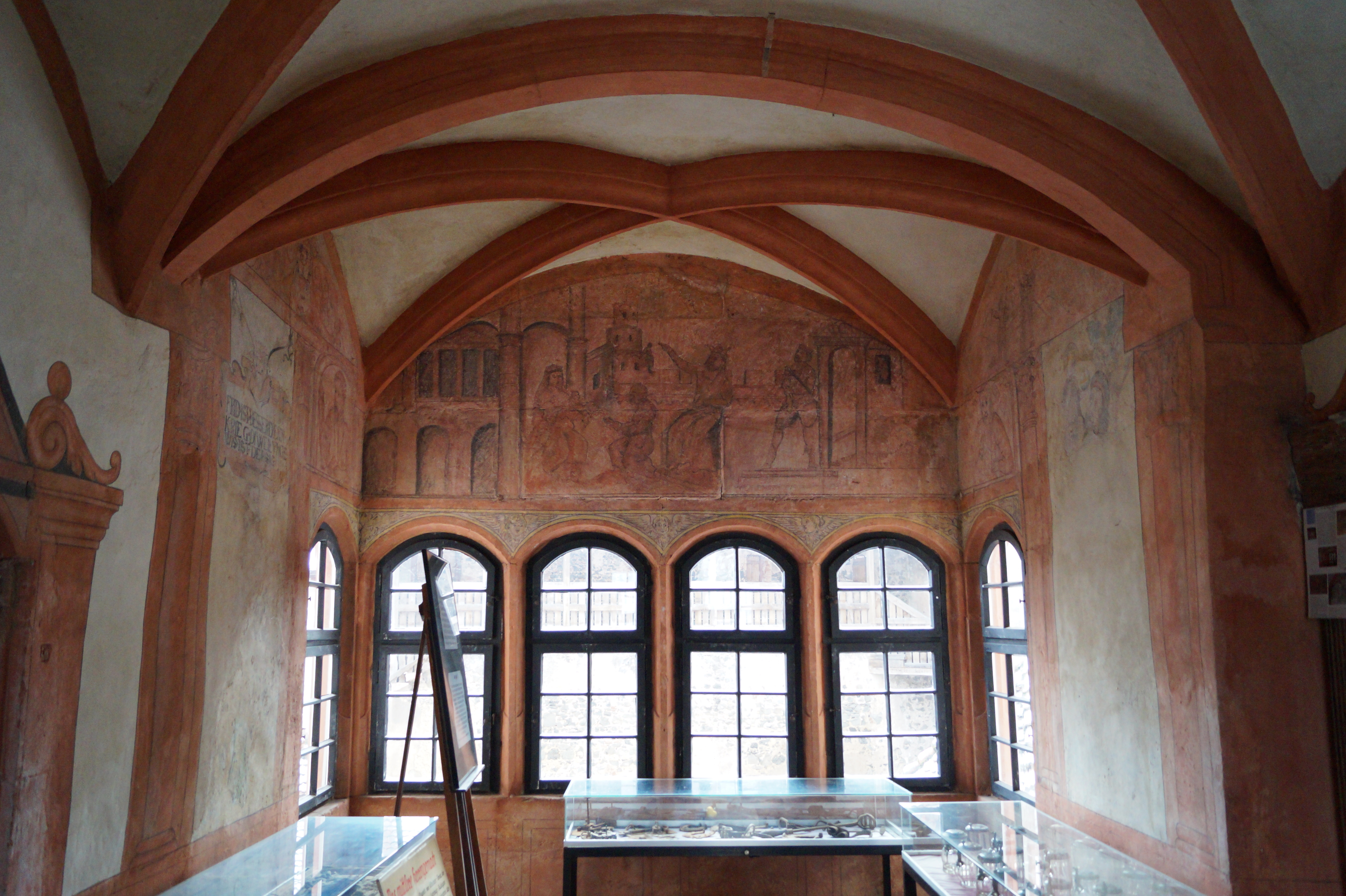
Painted bay window vault on the 2nd floor

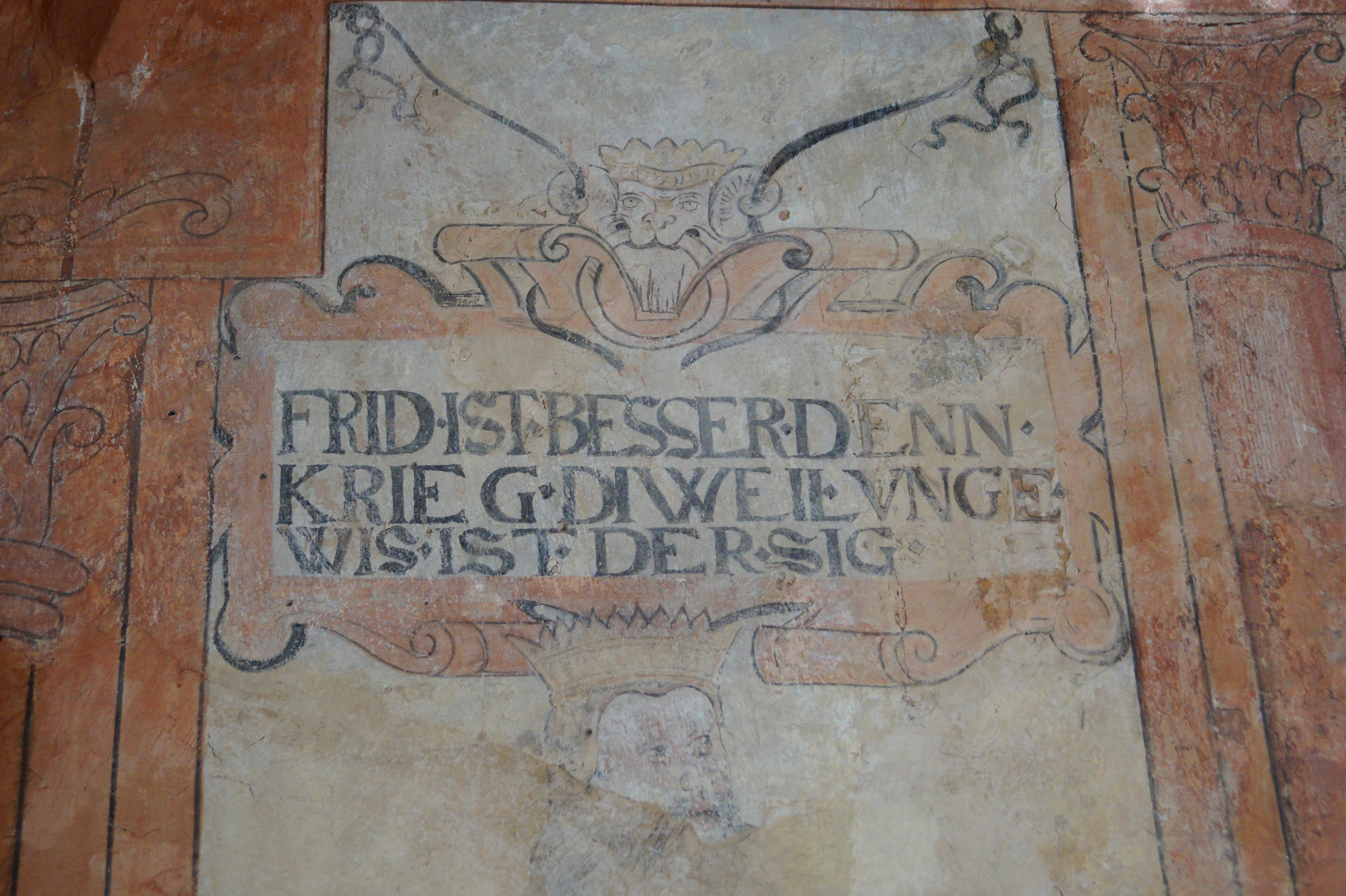
Wall inscription

=== Zinzendorf Building (Fourth Gate House) ===
At the Zinzendorf Building and the integrated innermost gatehouse, one can find various building eras of the castle. The outer archway from 1570 is supported by corner ashlars dating back to the 14th century. The passage is covered by a groined vault, which still displays remnants of Renaissance paintings. The inner archway leading to the castle courtyard is dated 1541, but it also features late medieval side walls, and the imposts may be among the oldest components of the castle. The Zinzendorf Building as it stands today was built in 1570 on the site of an older gatehouse, but it did not acquire its name until the 20th century. It's possible that the vault above the gateway originally supported a gallery-like defensive platform.

The building has a richly decorated oriel with blind tracery on the courtyard side, similar examples of which can be found in Büdingen. The tracery of the window parapet features the coat of arms of Count Heinrich von Ysenburg-Ronneburg and his first wife, Maria von Rappoltstein. On the adjacent staircase building, there's a foundation stone inscribed with the date "1570."

The upper floor of the building above the gatehouse is entirely occupied by a hall. Since the 18th century, it served as a New Church for the resident religious community, named after Nikolaus Ludwig von Zinzendorf as the Zinzendorfsaal. Originally, it was likely a larger living room dating back to the construction period of 1570. This hall features a rectangular Gothic vaulted bay window with ribbed vaulting on both the courtyard and exterior sides.

=== Fountain House (Third Gate House) ===
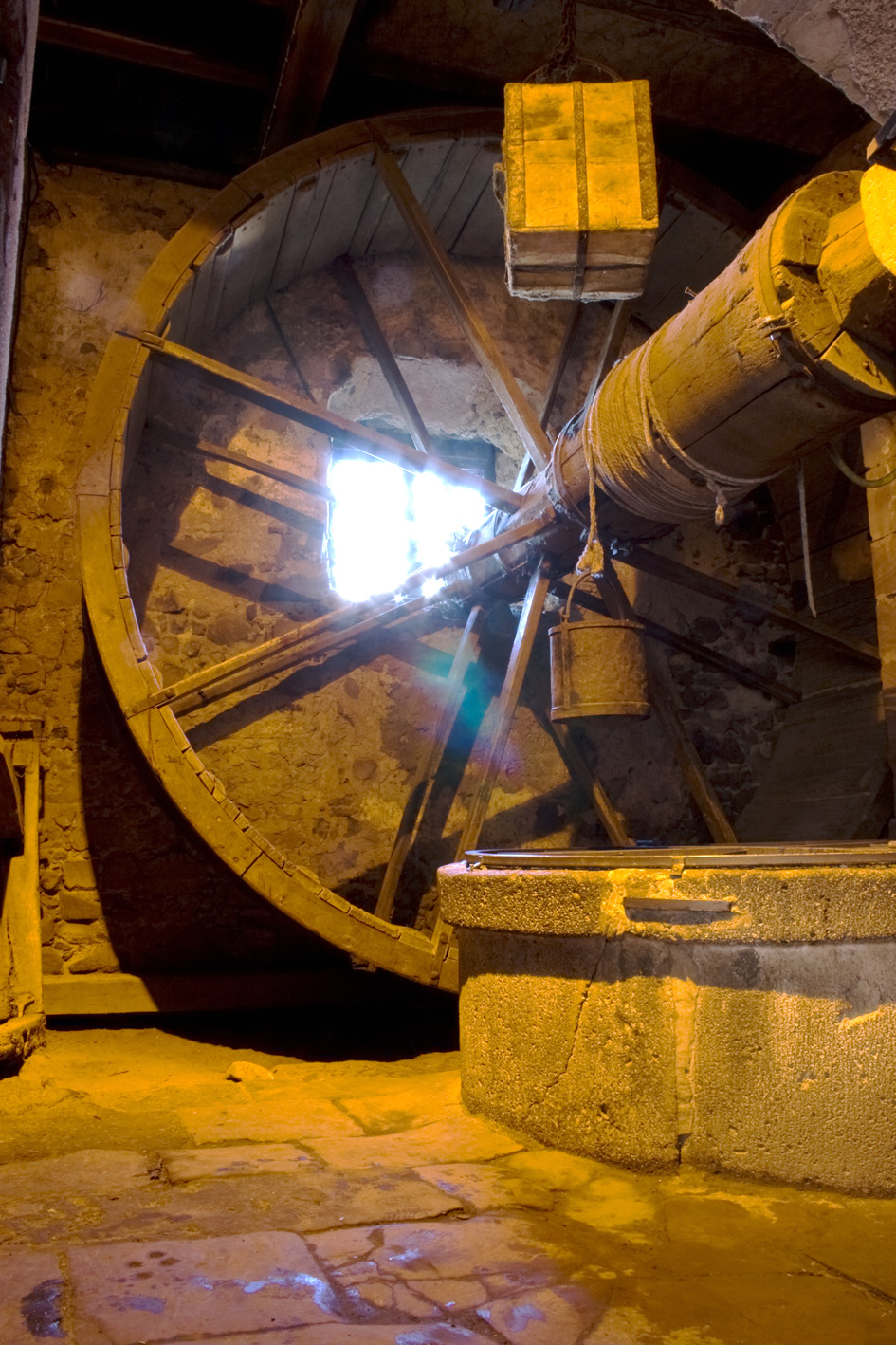
Castle fountain

The core of the third gate building likely dates to the 14th century when an additional gate was added in front of the core castle. The original gate's outline can still be seen in the former moat on the north side. The simply profiled pointed arch of the gate dates from the late 15th century. An armorial stone above the gate was inserted in 1523, replacing an older window. Originally, above the gate, there likely was a mechanism for a drawbridge. The vault now above the gateway was added later. The condition of the ramp leading to the gate (renewed in 1565) also suggests the presence of a drawbridge. The robust masonry extends about two and a half meters in front of the gate, with a clear masonry connection added later.

To the southwest of the gate, the passage is flanked by a sturdy round tower. During the construction of the gate, a portion of the tower's masonry was removed, indicating that the tower is older than the current gateway and was adapted to it when the gate was reconstructed. In the 16th century, when the gatehouse to the north was converted into the well house, the guardroom was relocated to the first floor of this tower.

The well house to the north of the gateway underwent several modifications. Initially designed as a guardroom for the gate, a triangular bay window was added to the north of the gate in 1529, and this year can also be found at the entrance to the guardroom. In 1550, the triangular porch north of the gate was removed to connect a weir walk. In the mid-16th century, with advancements in mining technology allowing for such construction, the castle well was inserted into the gatehouse. Access to the well room is through the gate passage. The upper layers of the 96-meter-deep well are made of ashlars, and pincer holes and stonemason's marks are visible. The water surface is located at a depth of 84 meters, although the well originally had a depth of 125 meters. Behind the well is the wooden turning wheel from the 16th century, which was operated manually. To install it, part of the masonry and the entire false ceiling of the former upper floor of the guardroom had to be removed.

=== Second gatehouse ===
The outermost gate of the core castle is an ogival gate with a small, one-story gatehouse that now serves as a museum ticket office. Above the gate, there is a coat-of-arms stone bearing the arms of Count Philipp von Ysenburg-Büdingen and his wife Amalie von Rieneck, along with the date 1527.

=== Kennel ===
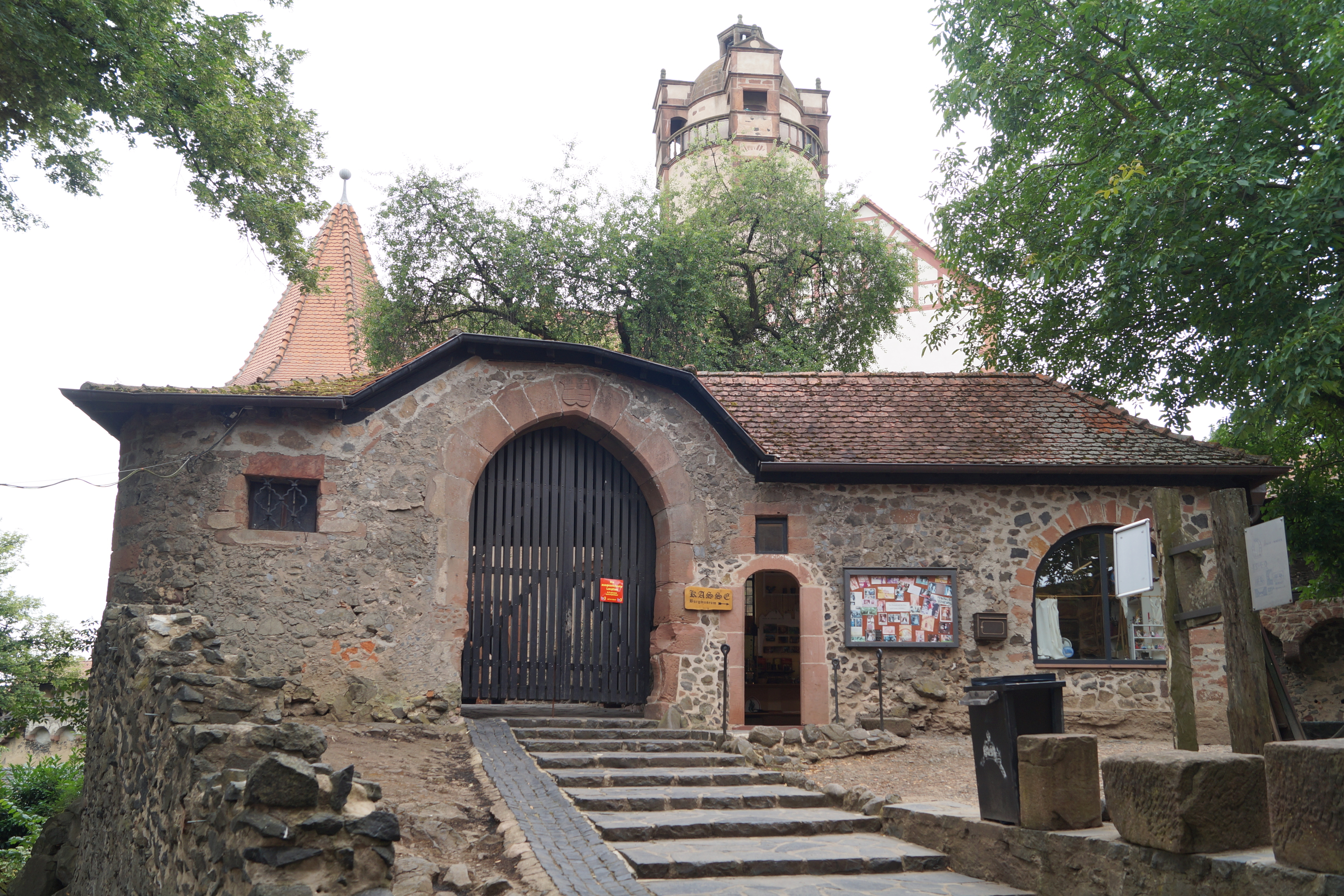
Second gatehouse (today the museum treasury) with the coat of arms of Count Philipp von Ysenburg-Büdingen and his wife Amalie von Rieneck and the year 1527

In the late 14th or early 15th century, the hall building was enclosed by a bailey on its south and west sides. This bailey originally featured three semicircular shell towers. The northern tower was later heightened to serve as a stair tower for the bakehouse. The original third gatehouse was likely built around the same time as the kennel.

=== Forecastle ===
The extensive outer bailey, situated in front of the core castle to the east and south, was built during the period when Ronneburg served as a residence, between 1538 and 1555. The northern part of the outer bailey was designed for defense and represents the primary attack side. This section features a high rubble stone wall with well-preserved battlements, including alternating covered and open embrasures, allowing defenders to engage enemies at the base of the wall. Notable architectural elements in this area include a pointed triangular bay near the gate, a pointed arched sally port dating back to 1540 to the right of the cyngel, an aborter bay, and the later connection of the outer castle to the core castle. Visitors can explore these features by walking along a footpath around the castle.

=== Marstall ===
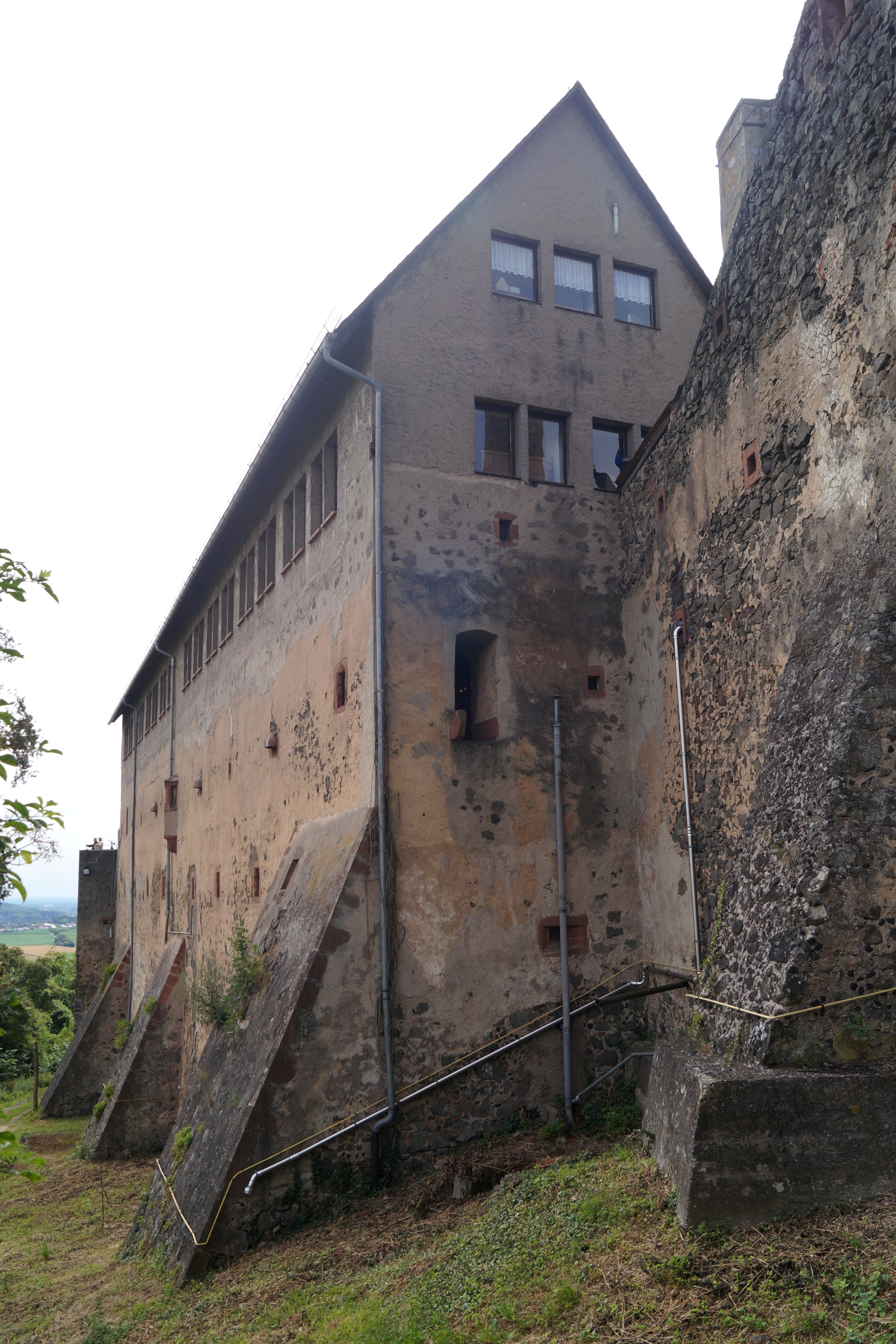
View along the stables (field side) to the southwest

The elongated Marstall, due to its size and location, resembles the main building of the outer castle. Two pointed-arched portals with inscriptions from 1549 and 1551 indicate the building's original construction period. However, the original upper floor was removed after 1838, when it was sold for demolition, and was only added back in 1964. Therefore, a historical impression of the building's structure can only be obtained on the first floor, where some plaster remnants are still preserved. Today, the Marstall houses the castle restaurant.

=== Band house ===
The band house is situated in the center of the outer castle. It currently has only one floor but features a larger vaulted cellar. This building originally served as a wine storehouse. The foundation stone was laid by Barbara von Wertheim in 1554, and another stone at the neck of the cellar bears the date "1555." The original upper floor was destroyed in the fire of 1621, reconstructed in 1654, and eventually sold for demolition in 1870. The relatively flat roof that exists today was added in 1905. A monument located next to the building commemorates Peter Nieß, who made significant contributions to the research and preservation of the Ronneburg.

=== First gatehouse ===
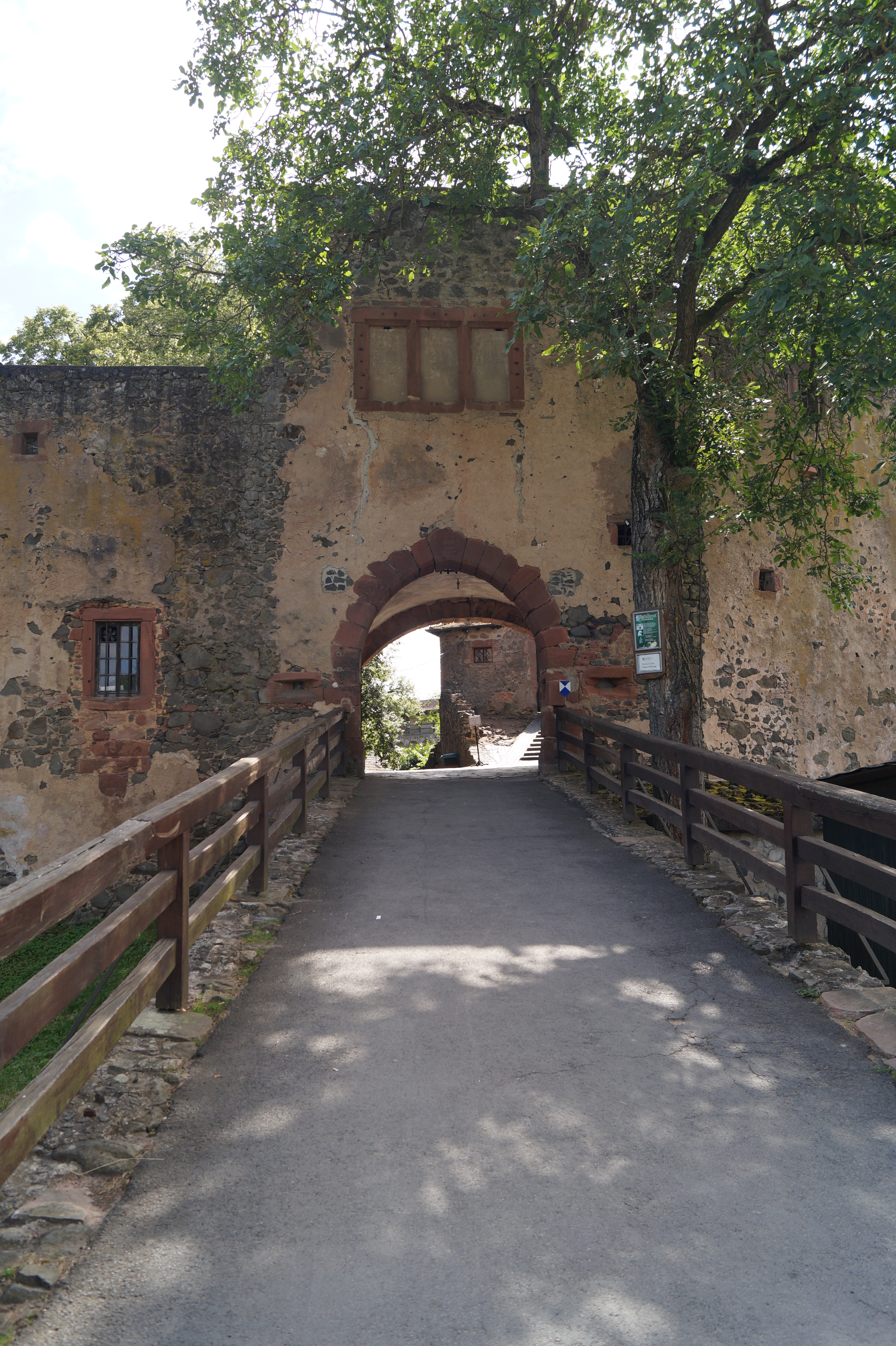
Exterior view of the outer gatehouse

The outer castle gate once clearly projected two upper floors over the outer castle wall. However, these upper floors with Renaissance gables were demolished in 1870, leaving behind remnants of a staircase at the transition to the Marstall. The exterior pointed-arched gate (with a coat of arms stone bearing the year "1538") did not feature a drawbridge. On the outside, there are traces of plaster over the quarry stone masonry made of basalt. Some of the walls were built with sandstone, including two embrasures to the left and right of the gate. Notably, the gate (the left gate wing is dated 1539) is equipped with wooden turning wings, a wicket gate, iron fittings, and a decorative lock. On the courtyard side, there is a broader arch with the date "1539."

The rooms adjacent to the gateway are accessible from within, including the guard's room to the southeast. A spiral staircase led from there to the former upper floors. The passages feature basket-arched portals, and the year "1542" is carved on the passage to the guardroom. Unusually, the window jambs also have basket-arched elements, which are distinctive for the 16th century.

=== Fortification towers of the outer castle ===
The northern area of the outer bailey is particularly secure. Originally, it's likely that the access road to the castle was located there, at the level of today's parking lot. The top of the defensive wall is occupied by a round tower, known today as Zyngel. Initially, this name probably referred to the entire circular wall. The tower features embrasures for hooked rifles and smaller guns, which could also be used to cover the flanks. The date "1540" on the sally port next to the tower suggests that this entire section of the wall, including the tower, was built during this period.

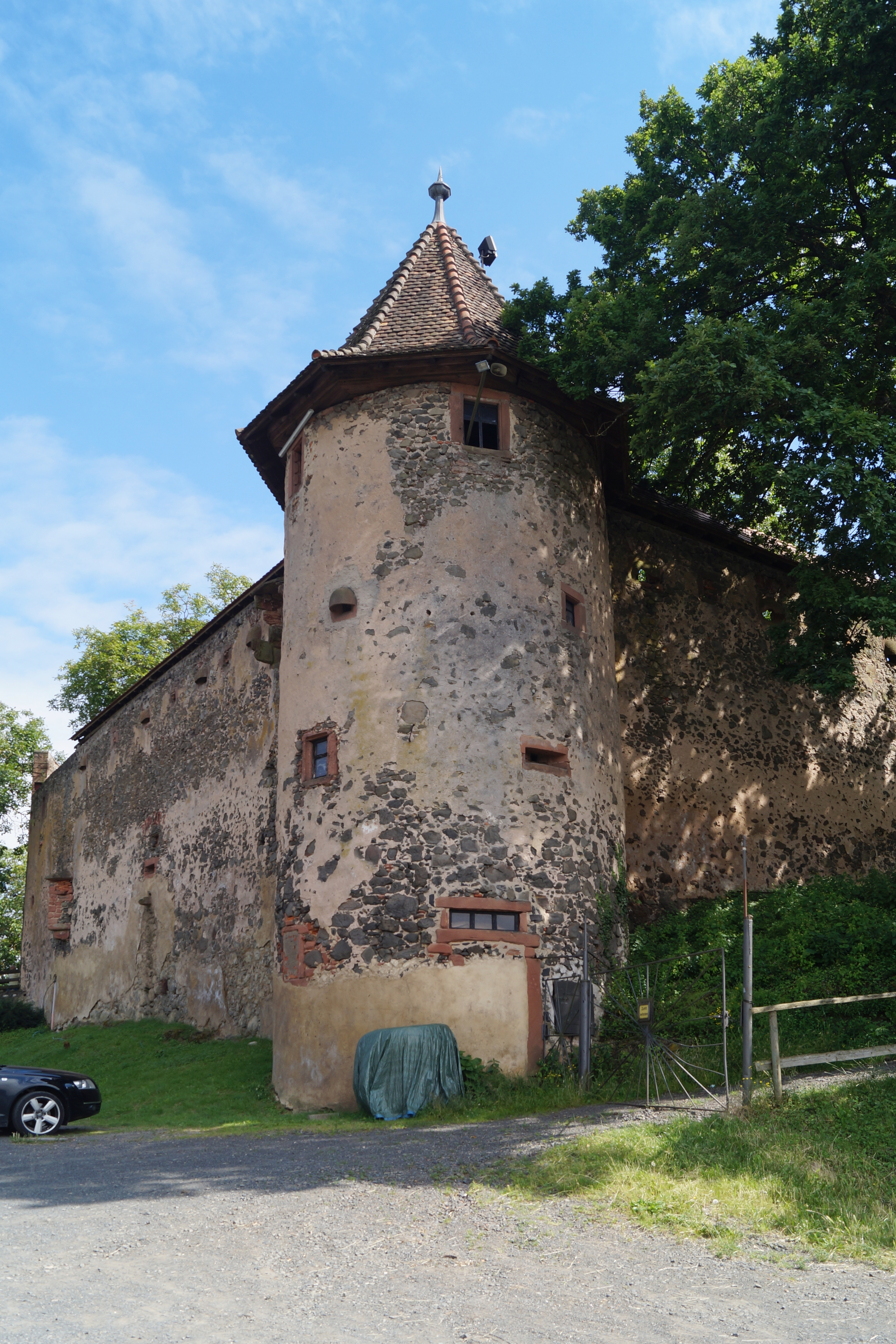
Exterior view of the Zyngel with the fortification tower, with gaps on it to flank the wall

The "Witches' Tower" was so named due to the tower stump of the high fortification of the outer castle, adjoining the Marstall to the southwest. In 1599, a woman accused of witchcraft was imprisoned there. Dates on an ogival portal in the basement and an embrasure on the outside indicate the tower's construction dates of 1550 and 1549, respectively. The prison was located only in the basement of the semicircular tower. At the top, it features a weir platform, which provides a good view of the actual height of the outer castle wall and the different types of embrasures.

A round tower was built between 1546 and 1549 to protect the southwest corner of the outer castle. A pointed-arched portal dates back to 1548, and the adjoining section of the wall (the west wall of the outer bailey) was completed in 1549. The foundation stone from 1546 was later placed in the upper floor and bears the inscription, "Do disz Mauer angefangen war, Graf Jorg den ersten Stein legt dar, des Augusts achtzehnten behalt, funffzehen hundert sechs vitzih zalt - 1546" (This wall was begun, Count Jorg laid the first stone, August's eighteenth kept, counting fifteen hundred six and twenty - 1546). The spiral staircase on the outside of the tower was added as late as 1905, using the reused steps from a staircase in the bakehouse.

== Current use ==
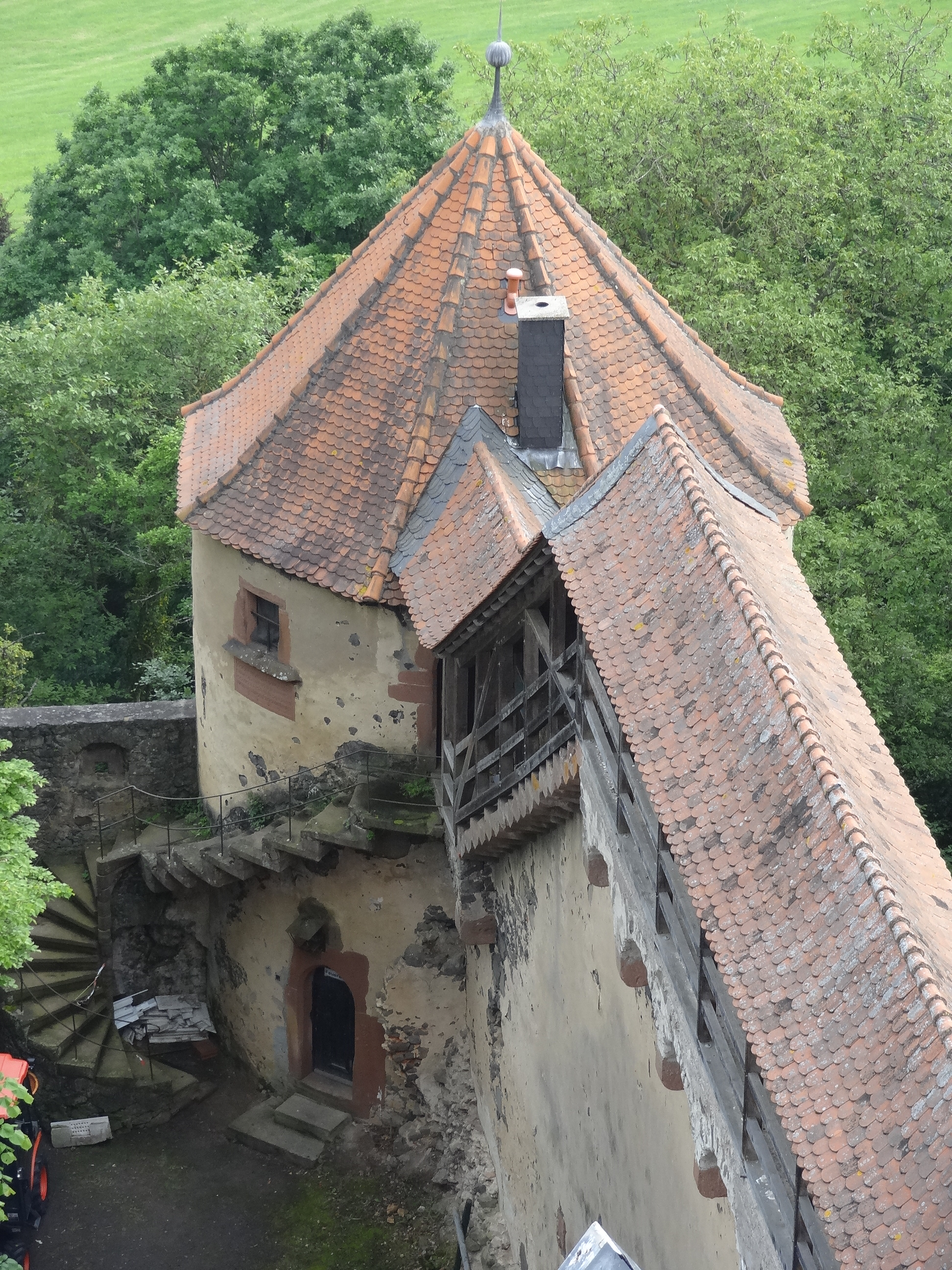
Ronneburg Castle

Today, the castle serves various functions. It houses a castle museum, a restaurant, and a falconry. The outer castle, including the restaurant, is open to the public during the day. The core castle primarily functions as a museum, with the ticket office and museum store located in the second gate building. Visitors can also climb the 32-meter-high keep of the castle, which provides panoramic views from the surrounding viewing platform. Telescopes are available on the platform, offering views that extend for several kilometers, and on clear days, it's even possible to see as far as Frankfurt.

=== Activities in the castle ===
The "Friends of the Ronneburg" sponsorship group organizes numerous knights' games and medieval markets. Regular bow making seminars are held, in which historical and prehistoric bows are replicated and basic knowledge of instinctive archery is taught.
