= Hilltop castle =

Hill castle built on a summit

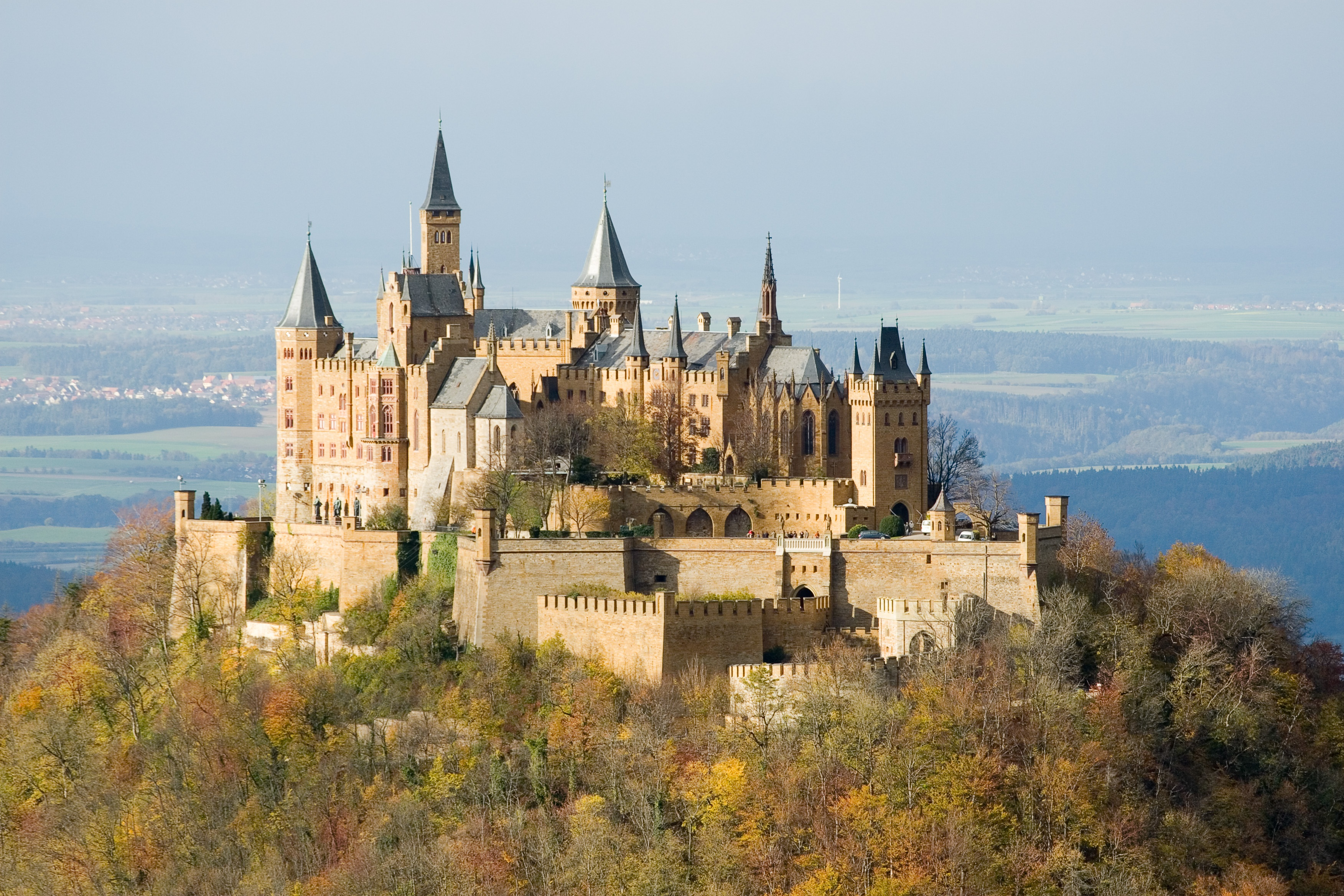
Hohenzollern Castle in present-day Baden-Württemberg, Germany, a typical example of a hilltop castle

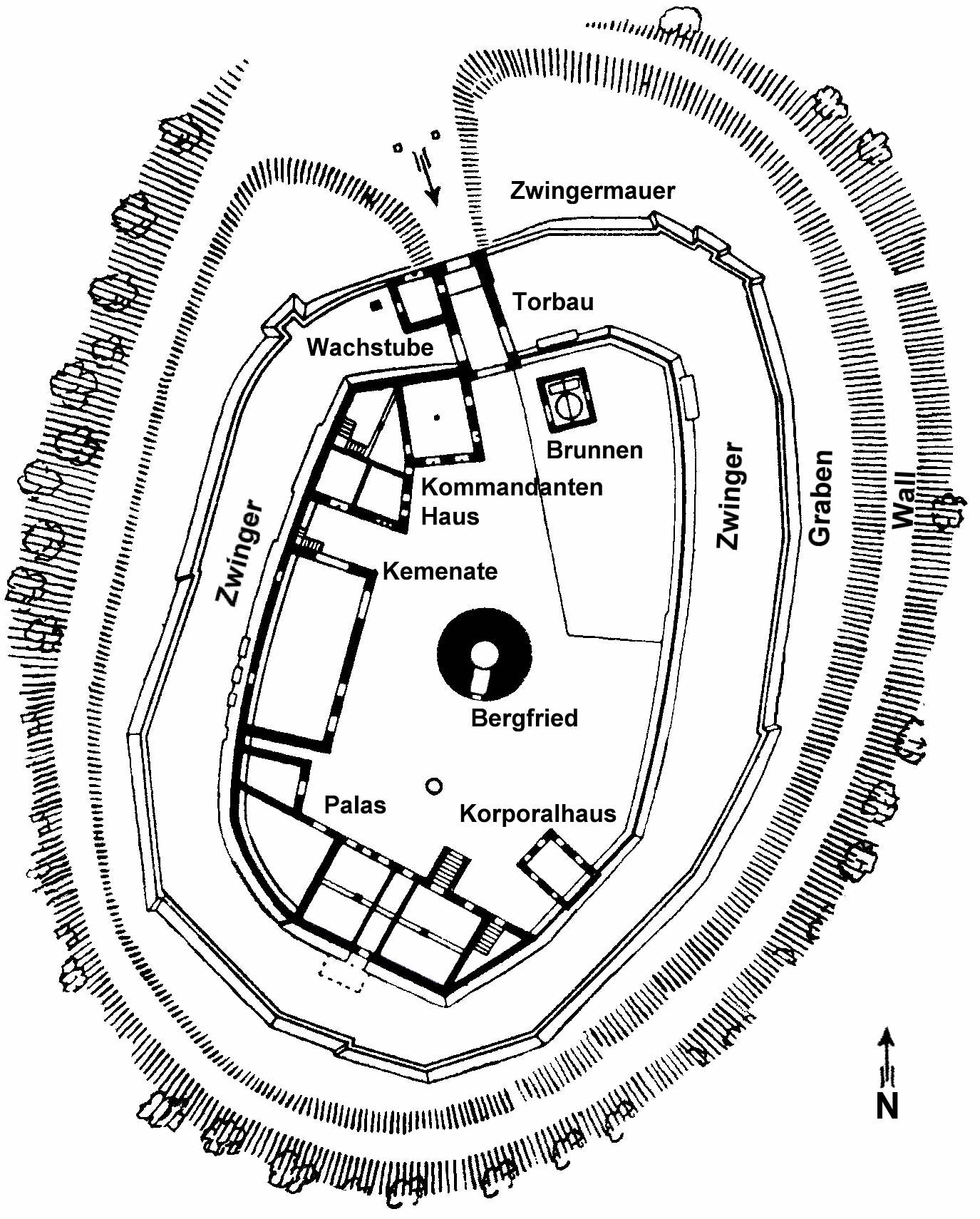
Plan of the Otzberg, a typical German hilltop castle

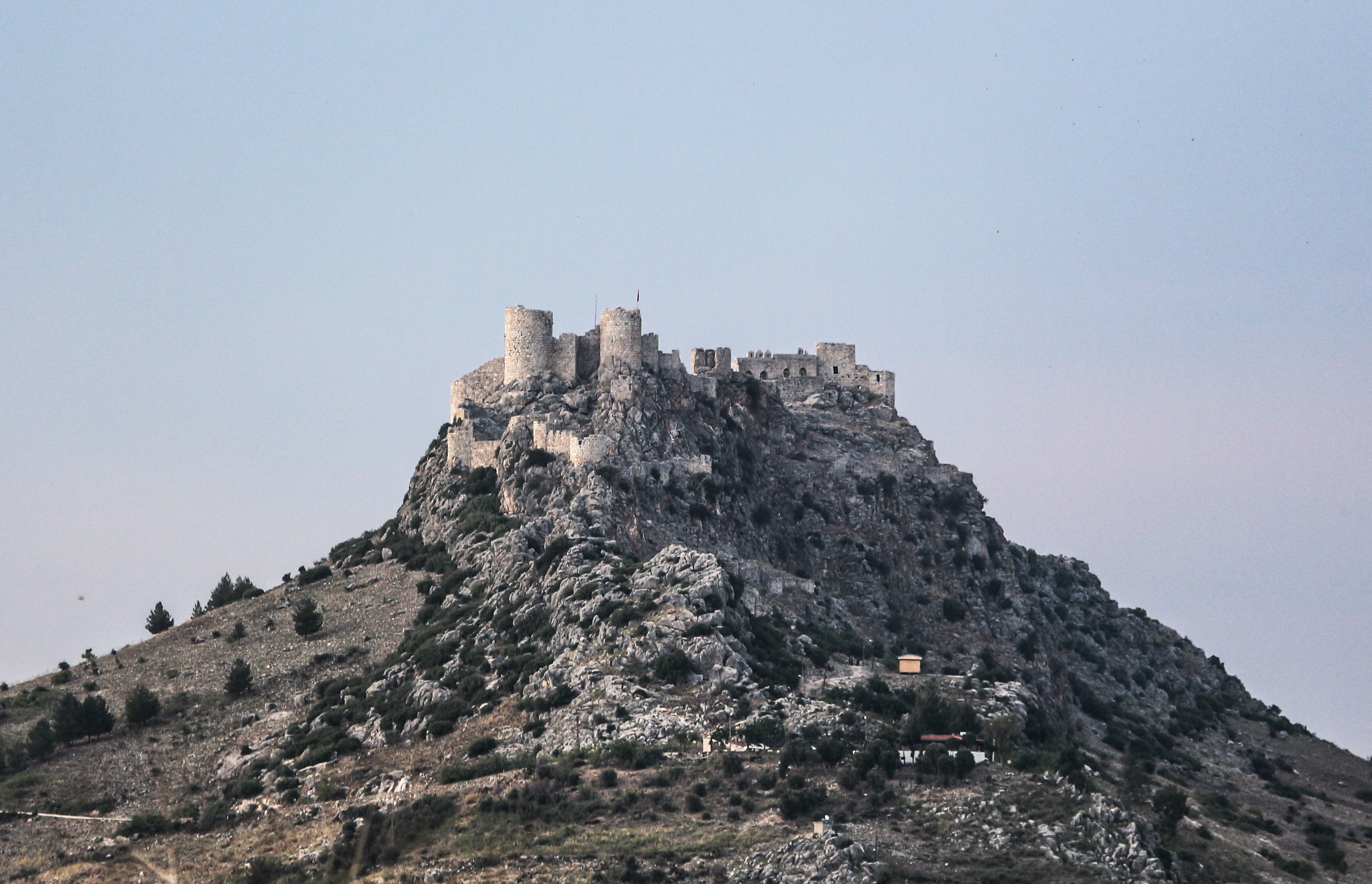
Yılankale in Turkey was built by the Armenian Kingdom of Cilicia on a hilltop.

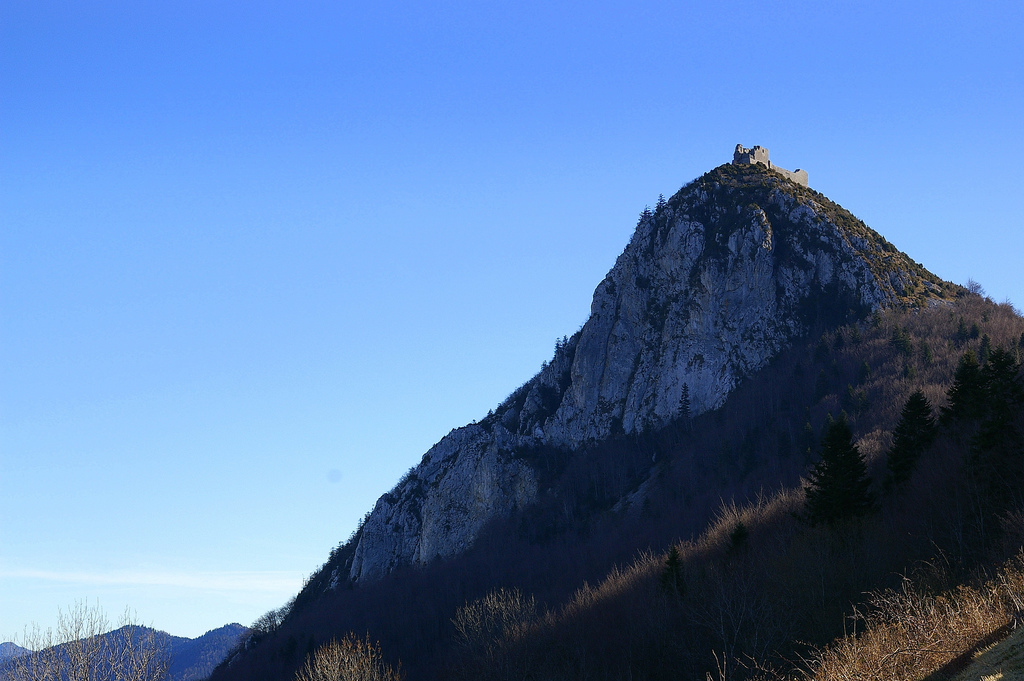
Château de Montségur on a hilltop

A hilltop castle is a type of hill castle that was built on the summit of a hill or mountain. In the latter case it may be termed a mountaintop castle. The term is derived from the German, Gipfelburg, which is one of a number of terms used in continental castellology to classify castles by topology. The chief advantage of such a strategically selected site was its inaccessibility. The steep flanks of the hill made assaults on the castle difficult or, depending on the terrain, even impossible. In addition, it often commanded excellent fields of view and fire over the surrounding countryside. The sheer height of the castle above the local area could also protect the occupants of the castle from bombardment. In addition, the prominent location of such a castle enhanced its status as a residence.

Nevertheless, hilltop castles presented their logistic difficulties. Without sufficiently strong pumps, water supply could be problematic if there was no well in the vicinity. The transport of food, working animals and other goods was also made more difficult by the location, and the adverse weather usually found on hilltops made living conditions in such a castle less comfortable.

Another problem was the isolation of such castles. The withdrawal of armed foot soldiers into the castle was hampered by the terrain; all the more so for cavalry. Its control over the surrounding region was therefore not always adequate.

Hilltop and spur castles were introduced by the Franks in order to hinder the deployment of heavy siege machinery. Whilst spur castles had to be prepared to defend against such equipment on their one uphill side, hilltop castles were completely surrounded by steep slopes that effectively prevented the use of such machines.

The classic example of a German hilltop castle is the 13th-century Otzberg, which comprises a circular bergfried on a hill above the village of the same name. The bergfried is surrounded by concentric, oval-shaped, inner and outer wards and an external moat.

The Cathars used a number of inaccessible hilltop castles as refuges, such as the original Château de Montségur, which stands on the summit of a steep rocky mountain.

Like other hill castles, hilltop castles lost their significance during the course of the Middle Ages. The rise of towns as economic and political centres reduced the value of such castles for trade and governance.

== See also ==
- Ronneburg Castle
