= Ruine =

Ruine may refer to:

- Alter Der Ruine, a power noise group from Tucson, Arizona
- La Grande Ruine (3,765 m), a mountain in the French Alps, in the Massif des Écrins
- Of Ruine or Some Blazing Starre, an album by English band Current 93

A number of castles in Austria and Germany are designated "Ruine":

- Ruine Diepoldsburg, a castle in Baden-Wuerttemberg
- Ruine Hauenstein, a castle in Styria, Austria
- Ruine Henneberg, a castle in Styria, Austria
- Ruine Hohenwang, a castle in Styria, Austria
- Ruine Kalsberg, a castle in Styria, Austria
- Ruine Katsch, a castle in Styria, Austria
- Ruine Klöch, a castle in Styria, Austria
- Ruine Liechtenstein, a castle in Styria, Austria
- Ruine Ligist, a castle in Styria, Austria
- Ruine Neudeck, a castle in Styria, Austria
- Ruine Neu-Leonroth, a castle in Styria, Austria
- Ruine Nollig, a ruined castle above the village of Lorch in Hesse, Germany
- Ruine Offenburg, a castle in Styria, Austria
- Ruine Pernegg, a castle in Styria, Austria
- Ruine Pflindsberg, a castle in Styria, Austria
- Ruine Puxer-Loch, a castle in Styria, Austria
- Ruine Raabeck, a castle in Styria, Austria
- Ruine Schmirnberg, a castle in Styria, Austria
