= Staehelin =

Staehelin or Stähelin is a surname. Notable people with the surname include:

- Adolf Staehelin (1901–1965), Swiss chess player
- Jenö Staehelin (born 1940), Swiss diplomat and lawyer
- Lucas Andrew Staehelin (born 1939), Australian-born Swiss American cell biologist
- Martin Staehelin (born 1937), Swiss musicologist

== Stähelin ==
- August Stähelin (1812–1886), Swiss politician
- Felix Stähelin (1873–1952), Swiss historian
- Hartmann F. Stähelin (1925–2011), Swiss pharmacologist
- Helene Stähelin (1891–1970), Swiss mathematician
- Johann Jakob Stähelin (1797–1875), Swiss theologian
- Rudolf Stähelin (1875–1943), Swiss physician
