= Katsch =

Katsch may refer to:

- Gerhardt Katsch (1887–1961), German internist
- Frojach-Katsch, a municipality in the district of Murau in Styria, Austria
- Ruine Katsch, a castle in Styria, Austria

== See also ==
- Alexander Catsch
