= Andrés Franco =

Andrés Franco may refer to:

- Andrés Franco (UNICEF), Colombian diplomat and UNICEF official
- Andres Franco (high jumper) (1925–2008), Filipino high jumper
- Andrés Franco (judoka) (born 1966), Cuban judoka
