= Albrecht Bethe =

German physiologist (1872–1954)

Albrecht Julius Theodor Bethe (25 April 1872 in Stettin – 19 October 1954 in Frankfurt am Main) was a German physiologist and was the father of physicist, Hans Bethe (1906–2005).

He studied at the University of Freiburg, the Ludwig-Maximilians-Universität München (under Richard Hertwig), the Friedrich Wilhelm University of Berlin, and the University of Strasbourg (under Friedrich Goltz and Ernst Julius Richard Ewald); receiving his PhD in 1895, at the Ludwig-Maximilians-Universität München. From 1896 to 1911, he worked at the Institute of Physiology of the University of Strasbourg, where in 1898, he obtained his doctorate in medicine. In 1911, he became a professor of physiology at Kiel University, and four years later, relocated as a professor to the University of Frankfurt am Main. In 1937, he was relieved of his professorial duties at the University of Frankfurt am Main (his wife was deemed to be half-Jewish by the Nazis), only to have them reinstated following the end of wartime hostilities in Europe.

He is well known for his studies involving the nervous system of invertebrates. He believed in the "plasticity" of the nervous system, asserting that if one part of the brain is damaged, another part could learn the functions of the damaged portion.

He was a co-editor of Pflüger's Archiv für die gesamte Physiologie (from 1918 onward) and of the Handbuch der normalen und pathologischen Physiologie (1925–32).

The young physician Rose Hölscher made a silhouette of him, published in the 1921 booklet Frankfurter Charakterköpfe with portraits of prominent Frankfurt physicians.

== Selected works ==
- Formaldehyd! Nicht Formol oder Formalin, 1895.
- Eine neue Methode der Methylenblaufixation, 1896.
- Allgemeine Anatomie und Physiologie des Nervensystems, 1903.
- Handbuch der normalen und pathologischen Physiologie, mit Berücksichtigung der experimentellen Pharmakologie (multi-volume, with Gustav von Bergmann, Gustav Georg Embden and Alexander Ellinger); from 1925 onward.
