= Permanent Representative of Switzerland to the United Nations =

- Reports to: Federal Department of Foreign Affairs
- Seat: 633 Third Avenue; New York, New York, U.S.
- Appointer: Federal Council
- Formation: 2002
- First holder: Jenö Staehelin

The Ambassador and Permanent Representative of Switzerland to the United Nations office was established in 2002, after Switzerland joined the United Nations. It is located at 633 Third Avenue in New York.

The current Permanent Representative is Pascale Baeriswyl, who will also assume a non-permanent seat on the United Nations Security Council on 1 January 2023.

== History ==
Switzerland held observer status in several United Nations (UN) organs since 1948, but did not join the UN over neutrality concerns and was a full member only of the International Criminal Court (ICC) in The Hague. In March 2002, the people of Switzerland voted to join the UN, and Switzerland became a member in September of that year. Since then, an ambassador has represented Switzerland at the UN.

=== Representatives ===
Neutrality continued to be an issue but, according to the first ambassador, Jenö Staehelin, Switzerland's role as a neutral country was accepted by fellow member states. Peter Maurer succeeded Staehelin in 2004 and served as the head of the budget commission of the United Nations General Assembly for the term 2009–2010. Switzerland aimed to assist the United Nations to evolve into a more democratic body or to strengthen the ICC. In terms of transparency, its third representative, Paul Seger, equated the election of the Secretary-General of the United Nations to the election of the Pope. During the tenure of the next ambassador, Jürg Lauber, the UN celebrated its 75th anniversary and had to cope with the effects of the COVID-19 pandemic.

=== Seat on the United Nations Security Council ===
In 2011 the Federal Council decided to campaign for a seat on the United Nations Security Council for the term 2023–2024. Its campaign slogan was "A plus for Peace". In 2020 Jenö Staehelin voiced concern about the Federal Council's goal to aim for a seat on the Security Council. Recalling Switzerland's tradition of neutrality, he assumed the superpowers would eventually exert more pressure than Switzerland would be able to withstand. In March 2022 the Swiss People's Party entered a motion to withdraw the candidacy. Federal Councilor Ignazio Cassis stated that withdrawing from a decision taken eleven years earlier was not an option for the Federal Council and the motion did not succeed. Switzerland and Malta were the only two eligible countries and it was assumed that the election would be a formality. In June 2022 Switzerland was elected a non-permanent member of the Security Council, with 187 votes.

== Representatives ==
Image	Name	Start of term	End of term
	Jenö Staehelin	2002	2004
	Peter Maurer	2004	2010
	Paul Seger	2010	2015
	Jürg Lauber	2015	2020
	Pascale Baeriswyl	2020	2023
