= Andrés Franco (UNICEF) =

Colombian diplomat

President of UNICEF
- In office 2002–2002
- Preceded by: Movses Abelian
- Succeeded by: Jenö Staehelin

Andrés Franco is a Colombian diplomat and UNICEF official. He was President of the UNICEF Executive Board, the governing body of UNICEF at the international level, in 2002. He has served as Ambassador and Deputy Permanent Representative to the United Nations (New York) of Colombia.

He has also been UNICEF's representative (head) in Argentina and in Peru. He currently serves as UNICEF Global Deputy Director of Private Sector, based in Geneva Switzerland
