= Gerhardt Katsch =

German physician (1887–1961)

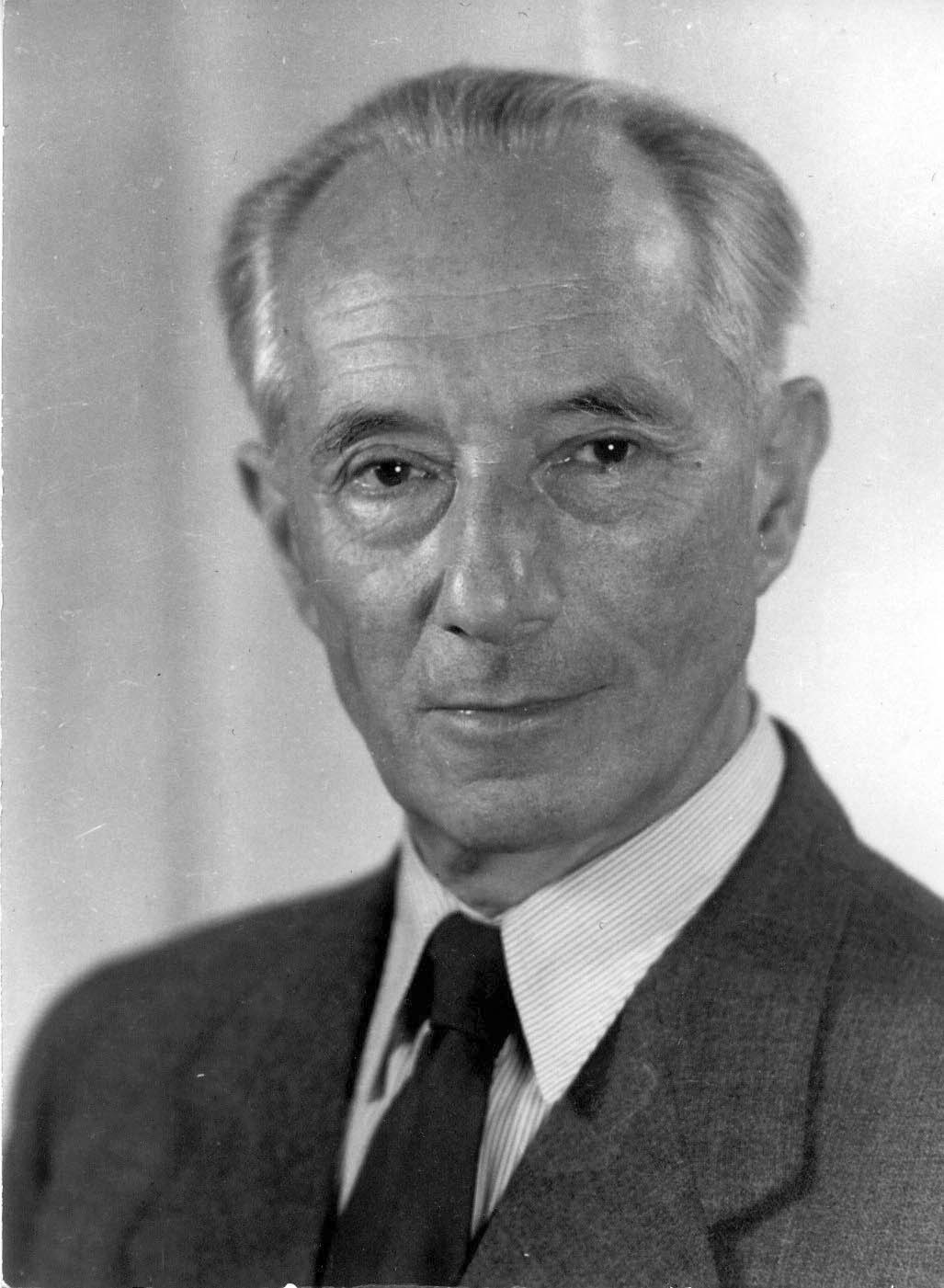
- Born: Gerhardt Alexander Ferdinand Katsch; 14 May 1887; Berlin, Germany
- Died: 7 March 1961 (aged 73); Greifswald, German Democratic Republic (East Germany)
- Education: Marburg University; Friedrich Wilhelm University of Berlin
- Occupations: Physician; University professor and rector
- Political party: NSDAP
- Spouse: Irmgard von Holck (1893–1977)
- Children: Burchard "Büchl" Katsch (1919–1996); Eberhard Katsch (1920–1942: nephew and family foster child)
- Parents: Hermann Katsch (1853-1924) (father); Elisabeth Beutner (1864–1908) (mother)

Gerhardt Katsch (14 May 1887 – 7 March 1961) was a German internist. Between 1928 and 1957 he served as Professor of Internal medicine at the University of Greifswald. It was on the initiative of Katsch that in 1930 a residential facility providing clinical and socio-medical care for Diabetic patients was established at Garz on the Island of Rügen. It was the first institution of its kind in Germany. Gerhardt Katsch is widely regarded – alongside Oskar Minkowski and Karl Stolte – as one of the three principal pioneers of modern diabetes management in Germany.

As head of the Greifswald University Hospital (as the University Clinic has subsequently been renamed) and the longest serving medical officer at Greifswald, at the end of April 1945 Katsch was involved, together with Rudolf Petershagen, the local military commander, in a speculative visit to what remained of Anklam, where the rapidly advancing Red army was encamped. They successfully engaged in negotiations with Soviet officers, as a result of which Greifswald was surrendered bloodlessly to the Soviets on 29/30 April 1945.

After the war ended, between 1947 and his death in 1961, Gerhardt Katsch headed up the "Institute for Diabetes Research and Treatment" in the former "Schloss" at Karlsburg (just outside Greifswald), which quickly became one of the most important clinical and academic institutions in the German Democratic Republic (East Germany). After he died the institute was renamed in his honour, "Institut für Diabetes „Gerhardt Katsch“".

== Life ==
=== Provenance and early years ===
The eldest of his parents' four recorded children, Gerhardt Alexander Ferdinand Katsch was born in Berlin. An elder brother, Johannes, had been born on 21 May 1886, but died after a few days. Notwithstanding speculation that emerged during and after the Hitler years in respect of his reportedly Jewish ancestry, sources citing contemporary information indicate that Gerhardt Katsch was born into a Protestant family. Hermann Katsch (1853-1924), his father, was an author-playwright and painter. His mother, born Elisabeth Beutner (1864–1908), was an opera-dramaturge.

Through his paternal grandmother, born Caroline Helene Antoinette Auguste Andrée (1832-1916), Katsch had a family connection with Nîmes: he attended the francophone "French school" in Berlin. When he received his "school [graduation] certificate" on 30 August 1905 it came with a rare "höchstem Prädikat" commendation. That same year he enrolled at the Sorbonne university in Paris where he studied Biology, Physics and Philosophy. By the end of what might have been the first year of a longer study period, he had decided to pursue a career as a physician. In 1906 he returned to Germany and embarked on a degree course in Medicine at Marburg University. Later he transferred to the Friedrich Wilhelm University of Berlin (as it was known at that time) in Berlin, possibly in order to be closer to his parents. His father had lost most of his wealth in 1906 after providing a three million mark financial guarantee for a friend who had been murdered, on account of which the whole amount had fallen due for payment. His parents' troubles were compounded by his mother's illness. Elisabeth Beutner Katsch was just 44 when she died of heart failure on 17 July 1908.

=== Graduate study, medical traineeship and war service ===
Katsch passed his state medical exams on 24 January 1911. This was followed by a six-month internship in the Experimental Biology Department at the Pathology Institute attached to the Charité (hospital in Berlin). He received his medical practicing certificate on 9 January 1912. A couple of weeks later, on 22 January, he received his post-graduate doctorate from the Charité Pathology Institute. His doctoral dissertation, published later that year, was supervised by Adolf Bickel and dealt with "Magenbewegung" ("movements inside the stomach"). In the ensuing months relevant learned journals contained a number of follow-up specialist articles, authored jointly by Bickel and Katsch, in which the authors elucidated further the research methods and findings applied by Katsch in undertaking his doctorate. By this time Katsch had moved to Hamburg where in February 1912 he accepted a position as a doctor's assistant and then as a junior doctor in the medical department at the Altona City Hospital ("Stadtkrankenhaus Altona"). Here he worked with the internist Gustav von Bergmann, who would later recall Katsch as his "best colleague" and "most impressive student". During 1913 he volunteered for a year of military service, undertaken with Infantry Regiment 91. Through the war years, Between August 1914 and January 1917, and again between August 1918 and November 1918, he served as an army doctor with Reserve Infantry Regiment 84. He remained listed as an assistant doctor ("Assistenzarzt"), and after 1914 as a senior doctor ("Oberarzt") at the hospital in Hamburg-Altona, indicating that he was able to combine his hospital duties with his military service. He also served on the so-called Western Front, during which time he was awarded medals including the Iron Cross Class II. Early in 1917 he was badly wounded in the Battle of the Somme and, in consequence, given a temporary leave of absence.

=== 1917 ===
Katsch made good use of his time away from the frontline. His boss at the Hamburg-Altona hospital, Gustav von Bergmann, had already played a decisive role in developing his career, and he would do more. Von Bergmann had accepted a professorship at Marburg University in 1916, and it was here that Katsch was able to lay the groundwork for his post-war career. On 26 February 1917 he was awarded a habilitation (higher-level degree) from Marburg University and the corresponding "Venia Legendi" (university-level teaching rights) in respect of Internal medicine, which opened the way to a life-long career in the universities sector. A titular professorship followed in 1918. It appears that the degree was awarded without the usual requirement for a substantial body of research work and dissertation having been imposed, which reflected the war-time conditions and recognition of work that Katsch had already undertaken during the five years since receiving his doctorate.

In Hamburg Gerhardt Katsch had come to know Irmgard von Holck (1893-1977), daughter of the businessman and sometime vice-consul Carl von Holck (1854–1926). Some of the letters they exchanged while Katsch was away fighting have survived, and provide a record of an increasingly amorous relationship between them. Irmgard was daughter of a still wealthy family of minor aristocrats. They married on 3 September 1917 close to the bride's home at Ottensen (which had still not, at that time, been subsumed into Altona and the Hamburg conurbation). The couple's only recorded (as birth-parents) child, Hermann Burchard Katsch, was born on 13 November 1919. The family were also joined at an early stage by Eberhard Katsch, Gerhardt's nephew, born in 1919 or 1920. Later there would be several grandchildren.

=== Marburg and Frankfurt ===
After the war Katsch remained at Marburg University, working in the department focused on war injuries and convalescence between July and November 1918, employed as a senior doctor at the university clinic, until 1920. In 1920, when an offer from the University of Frankfurt am Main persuaded Gustav von Bergmann to move on again, Katsch and his family made the same move. In 1921, Katsch accepted an extraordinary professorship at the University of Frankfurt am Main, while working, until 1926, as a senior doctor at the University Clinic. In 1926/27, von Bergmann moved on again, this time to the Charité in Berlin. But this time, Katsch stayed behind, taking on the role of Chief physician at the Clinic for Internal Medicine at the venerable Holy Ghost Hospital. It was the first time he had been given charge of his own department.

Both in Marburg and, after 1920, in Frankfurt, Katsch engaged in studies both of illnesses and of illness investigation methods involving the stomach, the pancreas and the intestines. As a physician and as a researcher he acquired, very early on, a particular interest in Diabetes mellitus. (Note: A century later, "Diabetes mellitus" is generally termed simply "Diabetes" in English language sources.) Just one year after the discovery of insulin by the Canadians Frederick Banting and Charles Best in 1921, Katsch began his investigations into the clinical use of insulin for treating diabetics.

=== Greifswald ===
In 1928 Gerhardt Katsch relocated to Greifswald, accepting a position as director of the University Clinic and as Professor for Internal medicine. Diabetes treatment and research remained his central focus for more than another three decades, till his death in 1961. They were therefore also the dominating theme in the clinical research at Greifswald. On 30 March 1930, with his strong support, the "Arndt-Stiftung Garz – Diabetikerheim" (subsequently renamed and repurposed) was founded. This was a residential treatment facility, initially with accommodation for thirty patients, at Garz on the Island of Rügen. He was also an enthusiastic backer of the establishment of the German Diabetic Association, with occurred less than a year later. On 1 September 1930, five months after the opening of the "Arndt-Stiftung Garz – Diabetikerheim", the first facility for the socio-medical treatment of diabetics anywhere in Europe was opened at the same premises. It became a template for other similar institutions elsewhere, for instance when a similar facility opened in Copenhagen. In 1937 Katsch published the "Garzer Thesen", one of his best known and most important pieces of writing. In it he set out, for the first time, his principles for the treatment of Diabetes mellitus. He postulated and outlined his principle of "produktive Fürsorge" (loosely, "constructive care") of Diabetes patients, and robustly rejected the general view within the medical establishment that diabetics were "unheilbare Stoffwechselkrüppel" ("incurable metabolic cripples"), substituting a more encouraging concept of "bedingt Gesundheit" ("conditional health"). He identified an optimal Diabetes Therapy, combining diet, insulin injections, physical exercise and appropriate education. Taken together in an appropriate balance, these should enable patients to enjoy a full working life.

=== Twelve years of Hitler ===
When Gerhardt Katsch accepted his professorship at Greifswald in 1928 the German republic was a parliamentary democracy. During the 33 years that followed the country underwent brutal régime change in 1933 and again in 1945/46. There were twelve years of Hitler, including a war that lasted more than five years and during which, estimates suggest more than eight million Germans were killed. For the central third of the country there were four years of overt Soviet military occupation. Very few university professors remained in post through that succession of upheavals. Gerhardt Katsch did. The Hitler government took power in January 1933 and quickly transformed Germany from a parliamentary democracy to a one-party dictatorship. In March 1933 Katsch became a member of Der Stahlhelm, a paramilitary association of First World War army veterans, widely associated by commentators and historians with post-democratic populism. At the urging of the new government, the Stahlhelm were merged into the party's own paramilitary organisation, the so-called Sturmabteilung (SA) in January 1934. Katsch, having just entered his sixth decade, thereby became an SA member, appointed to the rank of "Oberscharführer" (loosely, "senior squadron leader") in the "SA-Reserve" during 1934. Called upon to explain this record after the political wind had again changed, Katsch did so: one "had to look for ways to protect oneself from multiple attacks, resulting most particularly from the fact that I had not - as I had been asked - found a pretext to dismiss a Jewish assistant". (Note: "... einen gewissen Schutz gegen vielfache Angriffe suchen musste, die sich besonders daraus ergaben, dass ich einen jüdischen Assistenten.... nicht - wie man von mir forderte - unter Vorwänden entließ.") This was probably a reference to his longstanding colleague Prof. Dr. Alfred Lubin, who was indeed Jewish, and who in 1935 managed to escape to Lithuania, and from there to Bolivia. Lubin and Katsch remained in correspondence till the former's death in 1956, and he readily confirmed the position just as Katsch had described it. As the antisemitic "Law for the Restoration of the Professional Civil Service" was applied with increasing enthusiasm by the authorities, notwithstanding his SA involvement, Katsch lost a number of senior physicians at his clinic during the middle 1930s. Katsch's own attestation, with appropriate genealogical back-up, that he descended from four "Aryan" grandparents went unchallenged by the authorities, which saved him from being branded as a "jüdischer Mischling zweiten Grades" ("semi-Jew") under the infamous antisemitic Nuremberg Laws. Nevertheless, finding himself under pressure from persisting rumours of his own Jewish ancestry, and no doubt fearing for the safety of his family, in August 1934 Katsch also joined the SS as a "supporting member". The SS was another large paramilitary organisation, which operated on the fringes of political policing. Those too old or too busy to engage in terms of hands-on involvement could nevertheless pay to become supporting members if they already had a suitably impressive military record: supporting members were not expected to become part of the "SS command structure", however. One way and another, Katsch and his family were not targeted personally in connection with reports of his Jewish ancestry. Most sources indicate that it was not till 1943 that he took what might have been construed as the logical further step of becoming a member of the NSDAP. Recent research at the University of Greifswald, which hold extensive archival records on Gerhardt Katsch, nevertheless indicates that Gerhardt Katsch joined the party on 24 July 1937, and gives his party membership number as 4,865,153. Party membership numbers run chronologically, and the membership number given here is indeed consistent with Katsch having become a party member in approximately July 1937.

In 1938 Katsch supported the emigration of his nineteen-year-old son Burchard to Mexico. (In 1956 Burchard returned to Germany, married Anna-Elisabeth Brandt in 1958, and then, between 1959 and 1964, produced three recorded grandchildren.) He joined the government backed “Nationalsozialistische Lehrerbund” (party teachers’ association) but managed to avoid having to become a member of the “Nationalsozialistische Deutschen Ärztebund” (party physicians’ association). In political terms he successfully resisted government efforts to impose "racial purity" dogmas on Diabetes patients. During the war years he was for some time “consultant internist” with the Military Health Service for Army District II (Stettin): responsibility for all the army hospitals in and around Greifswald was added to his consultancy portfolio in 1940/41. Katsch himself served on the frontline, presumably as an army doctor, in the Balkans between the end of November 1941 and March 1942, and then again in Ukraine between May 1943 and November 1943. His diary entries from this period were subsequently published. They may have been written with half an eye on future publication or at least on the possibility that they might fall into the hands of the German authorities, since they scrupulously avoid personal judgements. This makes the coldly factual assessment that he recorded - for instance in his diary entry for 9 July 1943 - the catastrophic "nutritional status" of German war prisoners all the more chilling.

=== After the Second World War ===
At the instigation of Rudolf Petershagen, the local military commander, during the night of 29/30 April 1945 Gerhardt Katsch, as head of the University Clinic and senior medical officer at Greifswald, together with the University Rector Carl Engel and Colonel Max Otto Wurmbach (1885-1946), the deputy military commander responsible for Greifswald, were part of a small group of city representatives mandated to deliver a surrender offer to leaders of the advancing Soviet army. Acceptance of the offer brought about the hand-over of the city of Greifswald without fighting. Had Germany not formally capitulated a few days later, involvement in this breach of Adolf Hitler's instruction that Germans should “fight to the death” would have had seriously personal consequences for Katsch, one of the least of which would be the conclusion that he had, by his actions, voluntarily resigned his party membership. It was a point that Katsch felt the need to emphasize after the war when trying to explain his party membership between 1937 and 1945 to influential members of another post-democratic ruling party after 1946.

During October 1946 Gerhardt Katsch received the offer of a planned professorial teaching chair for Internal Medicine at the University of Mainz. Between 1945 and 1949 the western two thirds of Germany was divided into four large military occupation zones. Greifswald was administered as part of the Soviet occupation zone while Mainz was part of the American zone. To the extent that there was any discussion of what would come after military administration, the assumption was that in the distant future the occupation zones would be merged into a single rehabilitated German state which Moscow was determined should be part of Soviet sponsored eastern Europe and Washington was determined should be part of U.S. sponsored western Europe. For some of the more thoughtful commentators it may already have been apparent that compromise might become necessary. Four years later Mainz would become part of “West Germany” while Greifswald would be in “East Germany”. Approximately two weeks after receiving the offer from Mainz, Katsch turned it down. (Note: Information on the Mainz job offer comes, in the first instance, from Katsch's subsequently published diary entries for 12 and 26 October 1946. Neither the diaries nor the subsequent sources that quote from them spell out why he turned the offer down, however.) After 1949 the implicit decision to remain in Greifswald turned out to have been a decision to spend his later years as a citizen of East Germany. There was also a plan by the Friedrich Wilhelm University of Berlin medical department to appoint Katsch as successor to his old teacher, Gustav von Bergmann, at the Charité. Von Bergmann had switched to the Ludwig-Maximilians-Universität München, in the American zone, in 1946 and it was foreseen that Katsch's installation in his place at Berlin would take place at the start of 1947. The appointment was nevertheless delayed, and according to Katsch's own report of the matter, during May 1947 he received a rejection from the Dean of the Medical Faculty at Berlin, however. (Note: Information on the negotiations concerning a possible move to Berlin to take charge at the university's the Charité hospital comes, in the first instance, from Katsch's own 1947 diary entries of 19 January, 9 and 19 February and 5 May. There are hints of growing doubts on both sides as negotiations progressed. Katsch became increasingly uneasy about working conditions and living conditions in post-war Berlin, when compared to the situation he already enjoyed in Greifswald, where war damage to the buildings and physical infrastructure had been far less intense. From eliptical references in the rejection letter of May 1947 he also inferred that university administrators and others with whom he would be liaising were conscious of doubts on the part of their military overlords about his own past - probably in relation to his former membership of the NSDAP - which they felt disinclined or unable to discuss openly with him. (The hospital had ended up in the Soviet occupation zone; though there can be no guarantee that equivalent scruples might not have been in the background over an equivalent appointment in one of Berlin's western sectors.))

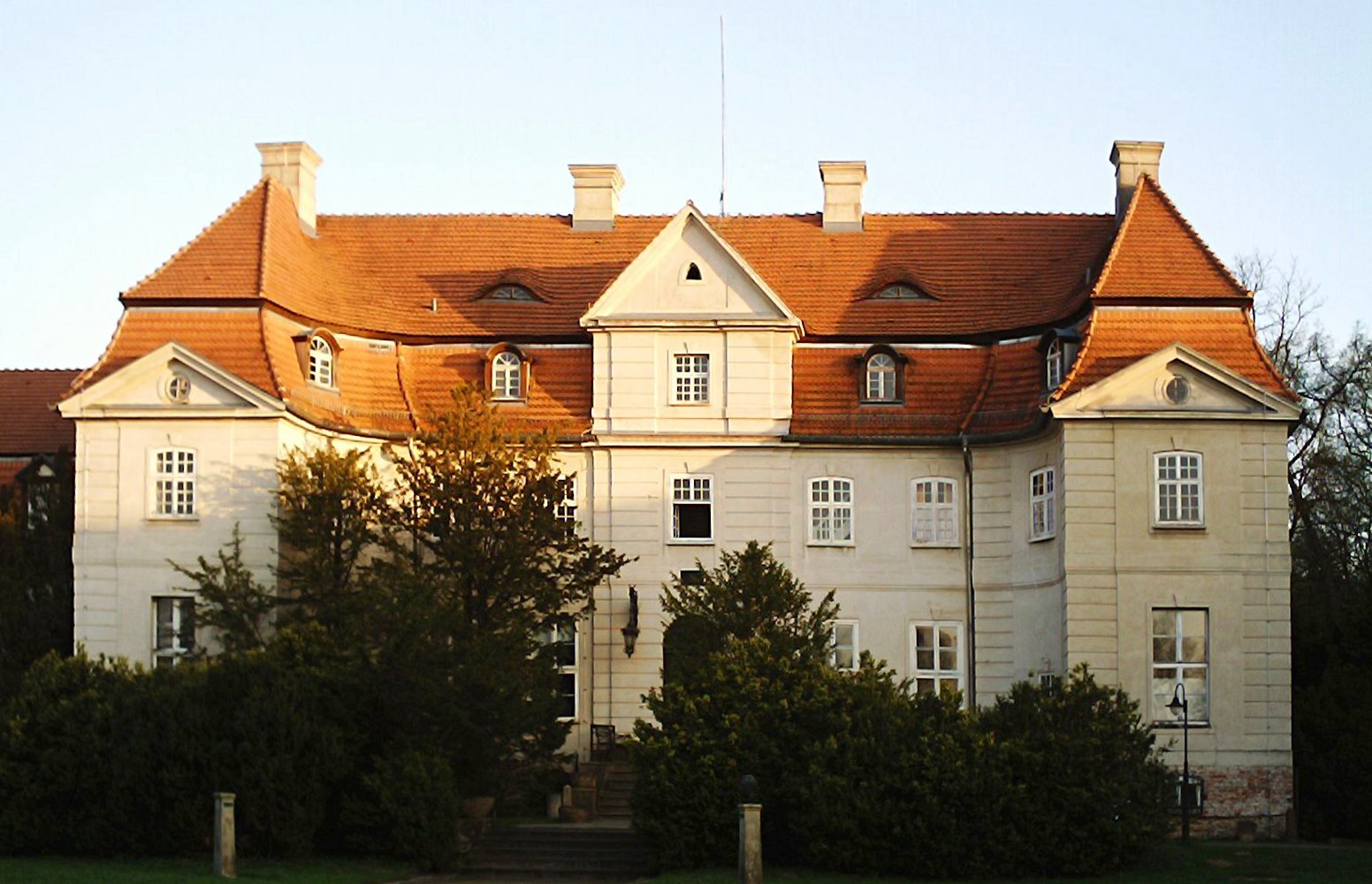
"Schloß Karlsburg" in 2006

Two years after the end of the war there was, in any case, plenty to occupy Katsch's energies in Greifswald. Close to the city, at Karlsburg, the putative heir to "Schloss Karlsburg", the castle-manor house dominating the village had been killed in action on 20 March 1944. Fritz Ulrich von Bismarck-Bohlen, his father took his own life on 28 April 1945. Other family members fled towards the western part of Germany ahead of the advancing Red army and the rumours of atrocities against civilians accompanying its progress. Soon after that the entire castle estate was confiscated without compensation in the context of the land reforms implemented in the Soviet zone during 1945/46. Schloss Karlsburg was used as a general purpose hospital and resettlement camp during 1945 and 1946, but in 1947 it was repurposed as a second residential treatment facility for diabetes patients, to be operated under Katsch's responsibility. The "Arndt-Stiftung Garz – Diabetikerheim", which had been opened on the Island of Rügen in 1930, was by this time far too small, but it continued to operate as a satellite facility. Its coastal location made it particularly well suited, during the summer months, for use as a vacation center for diabetic children. In 1950 the main Institute at Karlsburg was renamed as the, "Institut für Diabetes-Forschung und Behandlung" ("Diabetes Research and Treatment institute"). Two years later two substantial houses in the castle grounds were given over to experimental Diabetes research. At Sellin on shoreline beyond Garz on the Island of Rügen the first special school in the world designed for and dedicated to diabetic children was opened in 1955. An accompanying holiday camp was opened on the same site a year later. Further expansion and development at Karlsburg and on the island sites followed.

In the German Democratic Republic (1949-1989) Katsch became one of the best known and most influential physicians and medical researchers of the time. After the foundation of the rival West and East German states, the eastern party leadership were conscious that he was one of very few German physicians of international repute who had not chosen to pursue his professional career in the west. In 1950, in recognition of his reputation and contributions, he was granted, through a resolution of the ministerial council dated 12 October 1950, what was termed an "Einzelvertrag" (loosely, "unique deal") which gave him far reaching competences and privileges, including a teaching salary which he would continue to receive after reaching the state retirement age, and the opportunity to continue serving as director of the Institute at Karlsburg for life. The package included more than mere monetary rewards. His son, who till 1956 still lived in Mexico was able to travel into and out of East Germany with few of the usual bureaucratic hurdles. The professor himself was permitted both to own a private motor car and to drive it, without hindrance, to his private holiday home, built in 1938 at Hochweiler (Sonthofen) in the Allgäu, far beyond the "wrong side" of the Inner German border which, for most of his fellow citizens, became progressively more impenetrable through the 1950s. Since Katsch died on 7 March 1961 it must remain a matter for speculation how far his remarkable travel privileges would have been restricted by the appearance in August 1961 of the Berlin Wall which, for all but the most privileged of citizens, put an end to foreign travel to the west. Despite his privileges he was able to sustain a certain level of political independence, and never became a party member.

Between 1954 and 1957, Katsch served as rector at the University of Greifswald in succession to Hans Beyer. His term of office coincided with the university's 500th anniversary celebrations, in which he participated some effect, notably in using the event as an opportunity to submit two letters to President Pieck (who at the time, despite his advancing years, was still formally head of state in the German Democratic Republic). The letters consisted of appeals for clemency on behalf of Greifswald students who had been convicted, following some form of student unrest, on political grounds. The outcome of Katsch's intervention is not known. In 1957, the year of his seventieth birthday. Gerhardt Katsch retired from his professorship at Greifswald. The university marked the occasion by awarding him an honorary doctorate. He continued in post throughout the rest of his life as Director of the institute at Karlsburg, which had become the leading institution for the medical treatment of diabetic patients in East Germany, and one of the leading research institutes in the country.

Early in 1961, while on a winter break at his holiday home in the Allgäu, Gerhardt Katsch suffered what turned out to be a fatal heart attack. He died at Greifswald on 7 March 1961.

His physical remains ended up in a family grave in Berlin. His successor at the institute was Gerhard Mohnike, who had been one of his students as far back as 1942, first at Garz, and later at Karlsburg.

== Academic and clinical-medical contributions ==
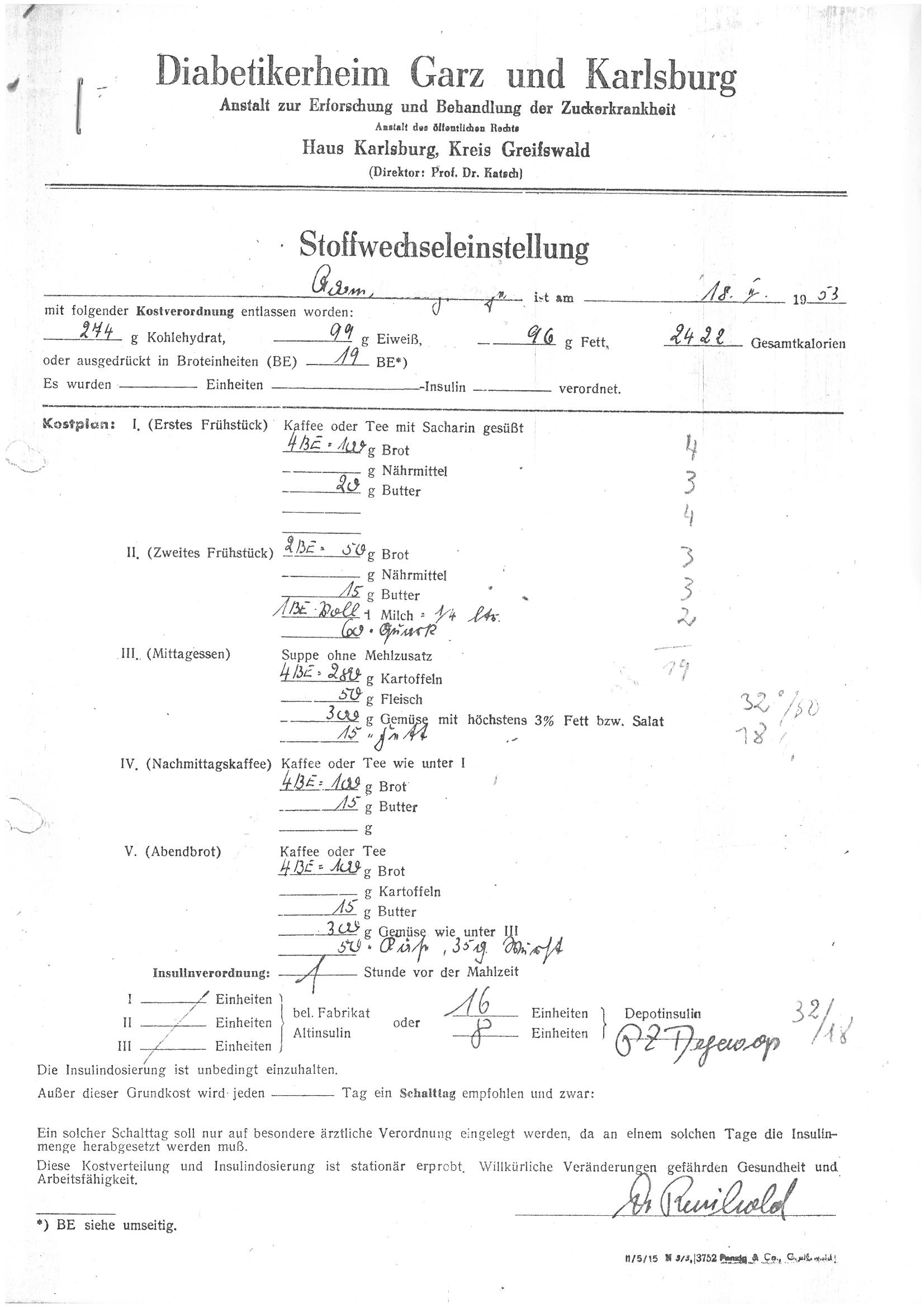
The diet plan for one of Gerhardt Katsch's Diabetes patients

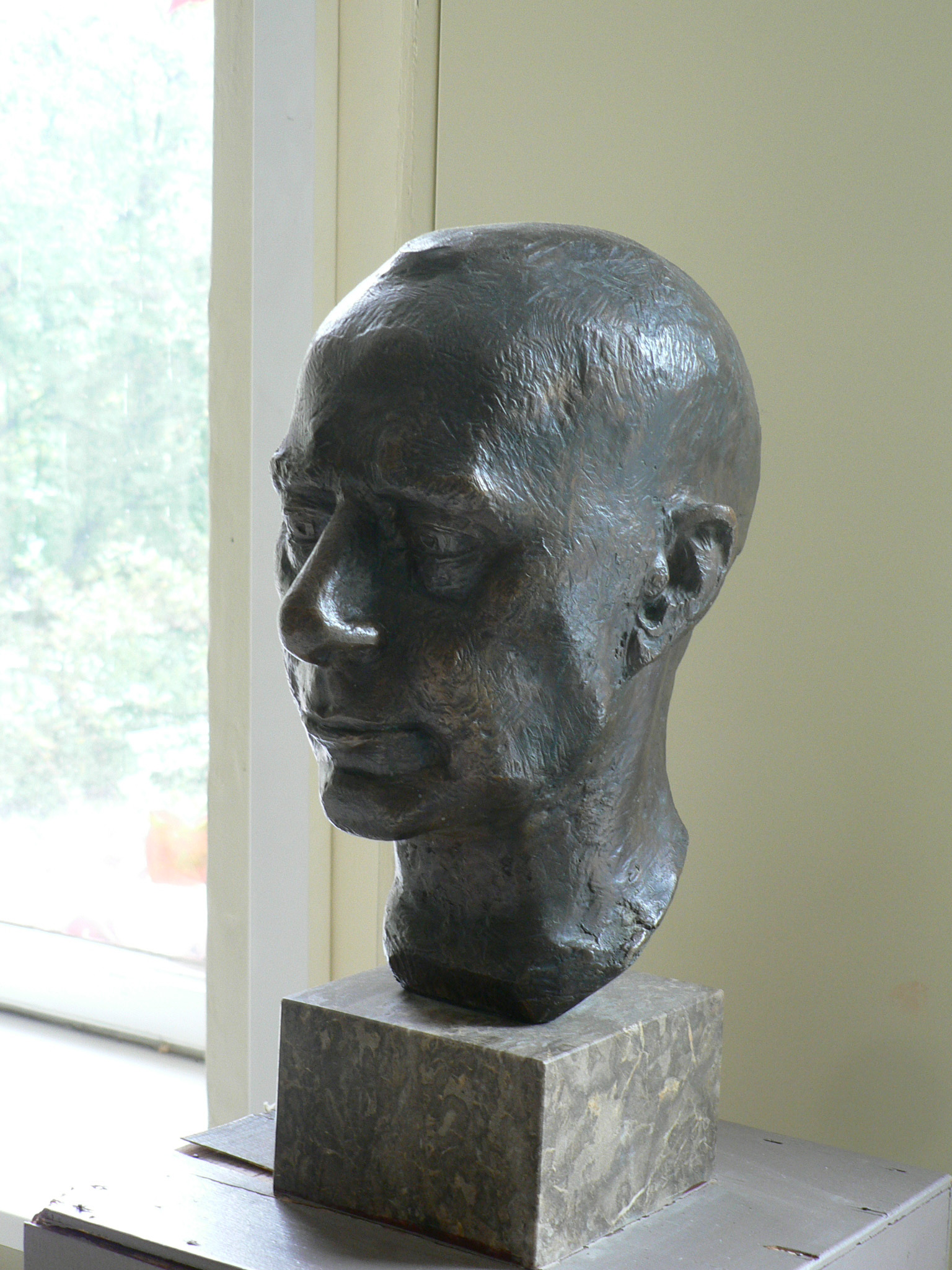
This bust of the diabetologist Gerhardt Katsch (1887-1961) by Irmfried Garbe is a permanent feature of Lecture Hall 2 at the Greifswald University Clinic. Those unable or unwilling to access the lecture hall can find identical castings out of doors in the park surrounding the former "Schloss" at Karlsburg or in front of Katsch's former holiday home at Hochweiler (Sonthofen) in the mountains south of Kempten and west of Garmisch

During the course of his career Gerhardt Katsch published approximately 220 academic contributions. He supervised more than 300 doctoral students and 14 habilitation students, most of whom were subsequently appointed to professorial chairs in internal medicine ort other influential positions in medicine. That made him one of the most important internists of his generation in Germany. His specialities were Gastroenterology, diseases of the Pancreas and, in particular Diabetes mellitus. In the case of diabetes research, alongside clinical issues such as the relative effectiveness of different insulin preparations and the effects of muscle contractions, his principal concern was with metabolic aspects, such as diabetic disruption of lipid metabolism.

== Free diet controversy ==
The "Garzer Thesen", which Katsch published less than twenty years after the discovery of insulin, was hugely influential and quickly came to define mainstream orthodoxy in respect of diabetes treatment in Germany (and beyond) for a generation. In terms of subsequent developments it nevertheless begged some important questions: one which stirred significant controversy through the 1940s, 50s and 60s, concerned the need to find an optimal balance between insulin dosages and nutrition. The pediatrician Karl Stolte (1881-1951), who had been director of the children's clinic at the University of Breslau before 1945, found it necessary to add a refinement to Katsch's theses. Based on his own experience of treating adults, Katsch had assumed that dietary choices should be significantly restricted in order to align with fixed insulin dosages. Stolte advocated a more variable diet - identified (if simplistically) in sources as a "free diet" - based on his own treatment of diabetic patients of all ages since 1929. Where menues were varied from meal to meal, a corresponding element of flexibility should be applied to insulin dosages. Patients were expected to monitor their urine and ensure that it remained free of glucose. They were to inject an insulin dose before each meal, variable according to the size and nutritional balance of the meal. Provided urine remained sugar-free, the insulin dosages applied were sufficient. At a time when insulin was relatively expensive and health insurance was far from universal, most patients had good economic motives for not overdosing on insulin. The Stolte approach did imply a level of confidence in the ability and willingness of patients to take responsibility for varying their own medication, however. According to detractors, trusting patients to the extent necessary would never have been deemed appropriate by Gerhardt Katsch. By the time the controversy became heated, Germany was at war, and there were no opportunities available to develop and undertake appropriate experimentation, which under other circumstances might have resolved the issues arising. During the 1970s, by which time suitable analytical tools had become more widely available, mainstream medical opinion was tending to line up behind Stolte's approach. By that time the main protagonists of the controversy were both dead, however. During the 1950s and 1960s, as the controversy refused to be stilled, it was Katsch's characteristically rigid approach that retained traction with medical establishments.

== Recognition and celebration ==
- The work of Gerhardt Katsch was widely acknowledged and celebrated, especially in the German Democratic Republic (East Germany). In 1953, he became an ordinary (i.e. full) member of the (East) German Academy of Sciences and Humanities in Berlin. In 1955 he also accepted membership of the Halle-based Leopoldina Academy. His government awards included the honour of being named a "Verdienter Arzt des Volkes" (loosely, "Honoured Doctor of the People") in 1951, and an "Hervorragender Wissenschaftler des Volkes" ("Outstnaindg scientist of the People") in 1956. Furthermore, in 1952 he was a recipient of the National Prize.
- On a number of occasions Katsch chaired at congresses of the German Internists, which were normally held in the west at Wiesbaden. In 1952 he chaired the German Association for Gastroenterology and Diseases of the Digestive and Metabolic Systems, and in 1953 of the German Association for Internal Medicine.
- Katsch's membership of distinguished international internists' associations testifies to his reputation beyond the frontiers of East Germany, not withstanding the country's political and economic isolation. The countries in which he was a member of some such association included Belgium, Spain, France, Switzerland and Mexico. In England the Diabetic Association (as it was then known), the largest organisation of its kind in the British Isles, even honoured him with the "Banting Memorial Lecture Award" in 1958. That same year an equivalent honour was bestowed on him at the congress of the International Diabetes Federation, held that year in, Düsseldorf (West Germany). The lecture in question was delivered under the title "Zur bedingten Gesundheit des Diabetikers" ("On the conditional health of the diabetic").
- In Greifswald, where he made his home between 1928 and his death in 1961, the city awarded him "Ehrenbürgerschaft" (loosely, "Honorary citizenship") in 1952. The next year, the University of Greifswald made him an honorary senator. That was followed four years later with an honorary doctorate accompanied by a golden chain of honour.
- After he died the "Institute for Diabetes Research and Treatment" which he had headed up since 1947 was renamed in his honour, "Institut für Diabetes „Gerhardt Katsch“". The honour survived a further minor name change in 1972 when the institute was renamed again, this time as the "Zentralinstitut für Diabetes „Gerhardt Katsch“". Further name changes followed the reconfiguration of medical provision implemented after 1990, but the institution continued to honour his name, after 1996 for the "Institut für Diabetes „Gerhardt Katsch“", a stand-alone research facility spun out from the original complex after the main institution had become "Karlsburg Clinic", a component institution of the University of Greifswald.
- There are streets named after Gerhardt Katsch in Greifswald and Wiesbaden.
- Since 1979, the German Diabetes Association has awarded the "Gerhardt Katsch Medal" annually to people "who have made a special contribution to the well-being of diabetics".

== Burial ==
The mortal remains of Gerhardt Katsch were buried in a little family grave plot at the "Alter St.-Matthäus-Kirchhof" (cemetery) in central Berlin. The plot had originally been acquired by hos grandmother in 1873 and is decorated with a figure by the sculptor Rudolf Pohle. The plot also accommodates the bodies of his wife, of the businessman Carl. W. Katsch (1813–1873), the artist Hermann Katsch (1853–1924), the sculptor Arnold Katsch (1861–1928) and a woman identified as Antoinette Katsch (1832–1916).

== Output (selection) ==
- Charles Darwin. Reihe: Hillgers illustrierte Volksbücher. Band 125. Hillger, Berlin and Leipzig 1909
- Garzer Thesen. Zur Ernährungsführung der Zuckerkranken. In: Klinische Wochenschrift. 16/1937. pp. 399–403
- Die Arbeitstherapie der Zuckerkranken. T. Steinkopff, Darmstadt 1939
- Das Leib-Seele-Problem in medizinischer Sicht. Wichern-Verlag, Berlin 1951
- Über die vitale Tendenz zu reaktiven Überleistungen. Akademie-Verlag, Berlin 1954
- Der therapeutische Imperativ des Arztes. JF Lehmanns, München 1958
- Kurzgefasste Diagnostik der Pankreaskrankheiten. Enke, Stuttgart 1958
- Betrachtung über die Funktion der Keimblätter. Akademie-Verlag, Berlin 1959
- Aceton bis Zucker. Nachschlagebuch für Zuckerkranke. Sechste Auflage. VEB Georg Thieme, Leipzig 1970 (as co-compiler)
