= Pascale Baeriswyl =

Swiss diplomat (born 1968)

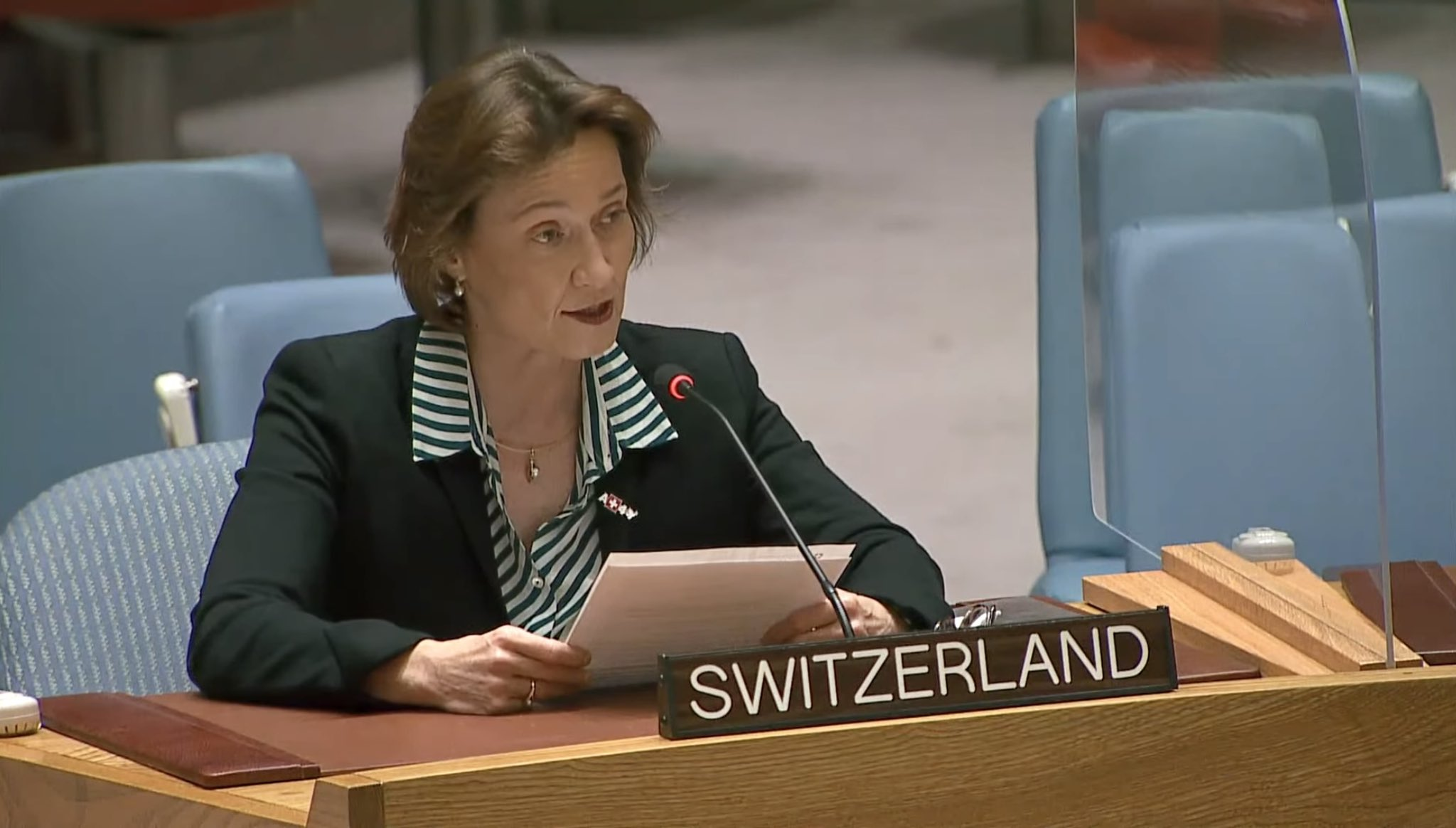
Baeriswyl in 2021

Pascale Baeriswyl (born 1968) is a Swiss diplomat, Ambassador and currently Permanent Representative of Switzerland to the United Nations (UN) in New York. She was the first woman to hold the post of State Secretary of the Swiss Federal Department of Foreign Affairs (FDFA) and has headed the Swiss Mission to the UN in New York since June 2020. From January 2023 to December 2024, Baeriswyl represented Switzerland on the United Nations Security Council (UNSC), during the country's first ever term as an elected member of the council.

== Education and early life ==
Baeriswyl studied at the Universities of Basel and Geneva and at the Sorbonne in Paris. She holds a master's degree in private and public law and a master's degree in linguistics, French literature and history from the University of Basel. After graduating, she worked as a researcher and legal advisor on domestic violence at the Swiss National Science Foundation and served for three years as a judge at the civil court of the province of Basel. Baeriswyl speaks German, French, Italian, English and Spanish.

== Diplomatic career ==
Baeriswyl joined Switzerland's diplomatic service in 2000. In 2001, she was posted to the Swiss Embassy to Vietnam in Hanoi, followed by a position as Deputy Head of the Human Rights Policy Section in Bern. From 2005 to 2008, she served at the Swiss Mission to the European Union in Brussels. From 2008 and 2013, she headed the political team at the Swiss Mission to the United Nations in New York, with a focus on the UN Security Council. In 2013, she was granted the title of Ambassador. From 2013 to 2016, Baeriswyl was deputy director and Head of Division of the Directorate of International Law, focusing among other things on international law issues in relations with the EU. Her department also included the task force on asset recovery as well as the sections on international law and international treaties.

=== State Secretary of the Federal Department of Foreign Affairs ===
Appointed by the Federal Councillor Didier Burkhalter, she became the first woman State Secretary of the Federal Department of Foreign Affairs in 2016. In this capacity, she coordinated the negotiations with the European Union from April 2017. As State Secretary, she was the highest-ranking diplomat, responsible for the strategic development of foreign policy and in charge of Switzerland's 120 Swiss diplomatic representations around the world. After Ignazio Cassis succeeded Burkhalter as Head of the Federal Department of Foreign Affairs, she was relieved of her duties in negotiations with the EU, while remaining State Secretary.

=== Representative to the United Nations in New York ===
In September 2019, Baeriswyl was appointed Permanent Representative to the United Nations in New York. Following Switzerland's election to the UN Security Council on 9 June 2022, she was the first diplomat to represent Switzerland on the UN Security Council.

== Political and other mandates ==
Baeriswyl is a member of the Social Democratic Party of Basel Stadt. In 2019, she was suggested as a successor to Eva Herzog on the Executive Council of the Canton of Basel-Stadt but declined and Tanja Soland became Herzog's successor instead. From 2006 to 2011, Baeriswyl mas a member of the diplomatic service admissions committee and thus involved in the recruitment of diplomats for the Federal Department of Foreign Affairs. From 2018 to 2020, she was a member of the Global Future Council on Europe of the World Economic Forum. Baeriswyl currently sits on the advisory board of EqualVoice, an initiative to promote the visibility of women in media coverage, and on the board of Security Council Report, a think tank dedicated to making the UN Security Council more efficient and transparent.
