= Peter Maurer =

President of the International Committee of the Red Cross (2012–2022)

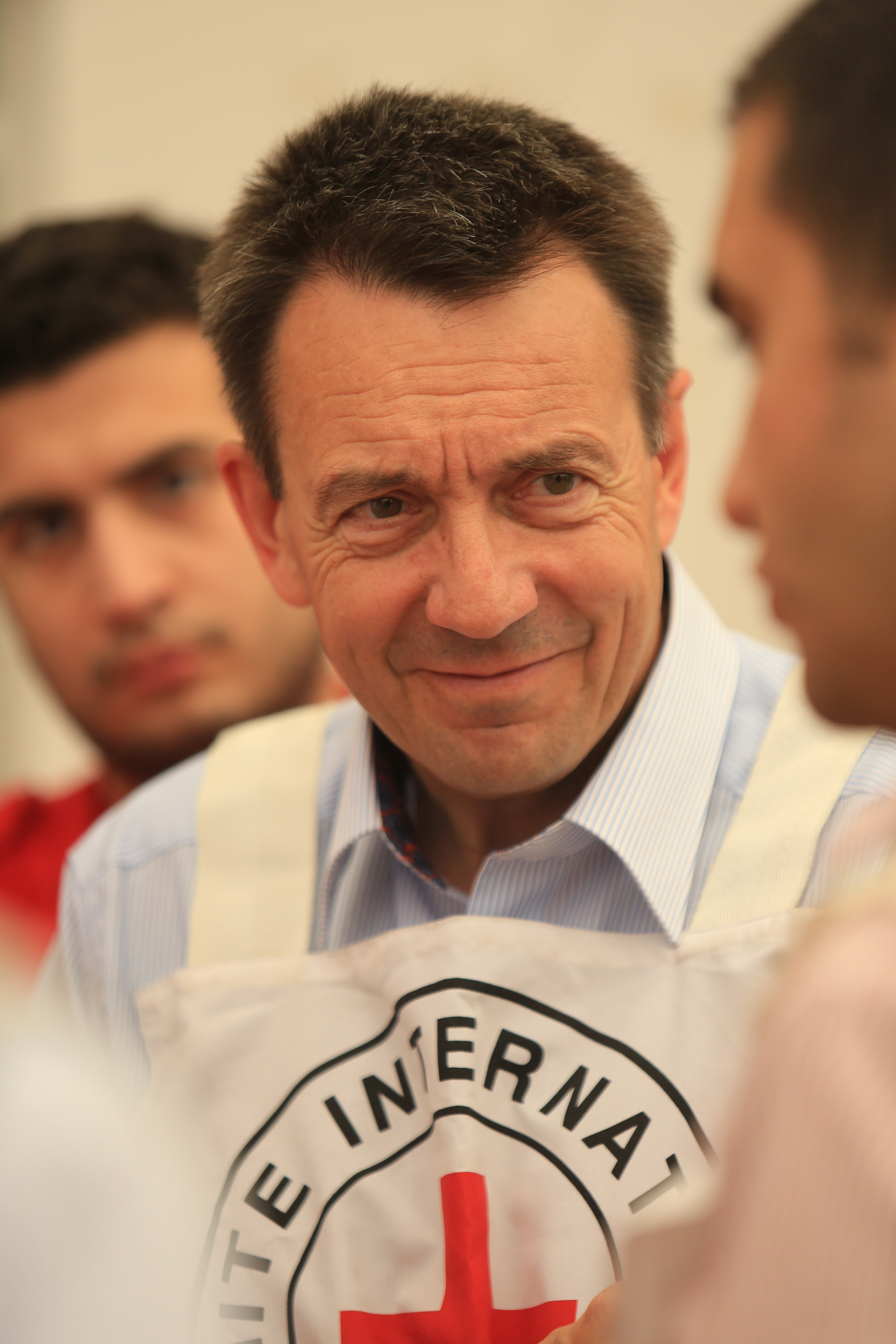
Peter Maurer during a three-day mission in Syria, in September 2011.

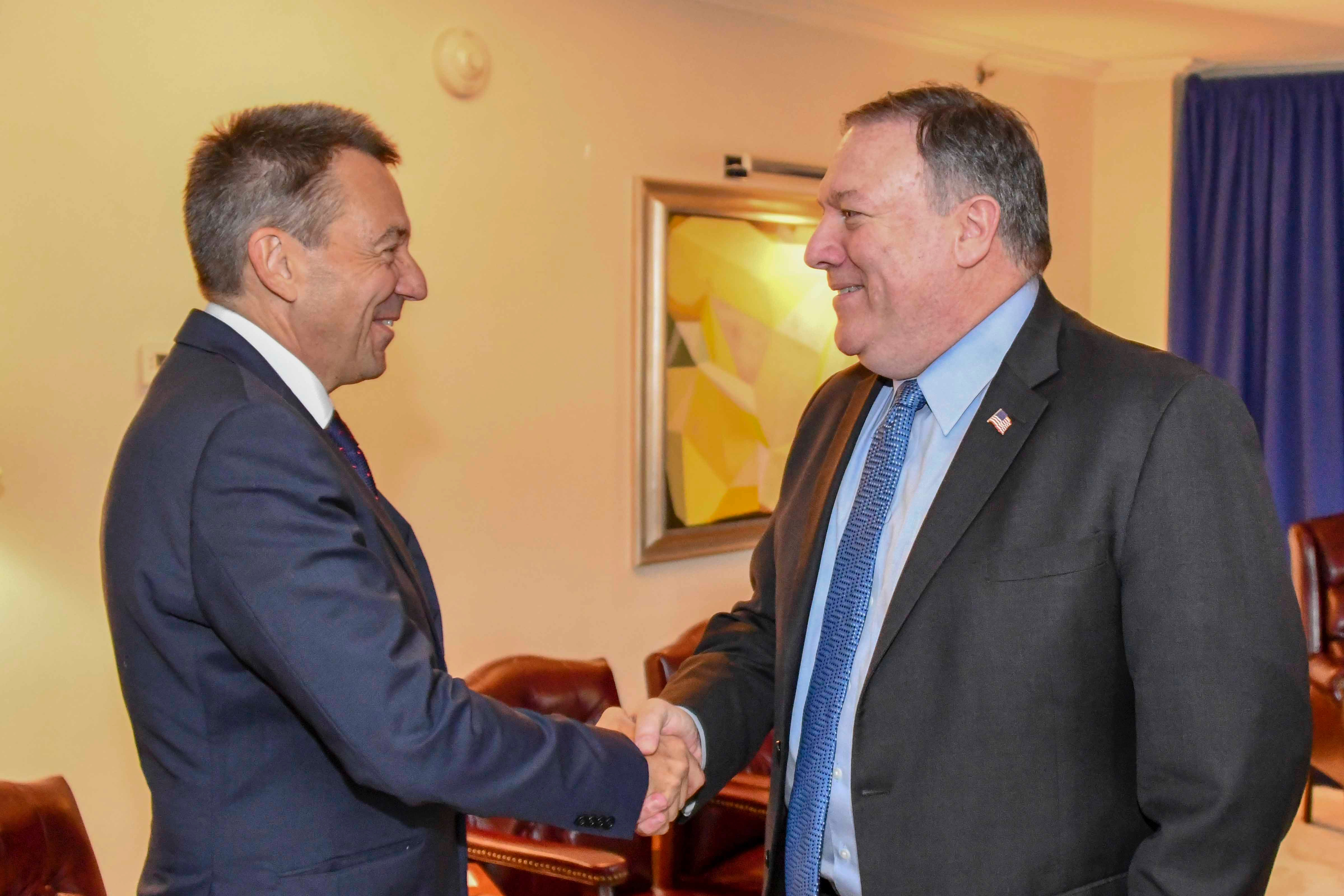
Maurer (left) meets with US Secretary of State Mike Pompeo (right) in 2018

Peter Maurer (born 1956) is a Swiss diplomat who was the President of the International Committee of the Red Cross (ICRC) from 1 July 2012 until October 2022 and is currently President of the Basel Institute on Governance.

== Early life and education ==
Maurer was born in Thun, Switzerland. He studied History and International Law in Bern, and was awarded a PhD.

== Career ==
In 1987, Maurer entered the Swiss Diplomatic Service (Federal Department of Foreign Affairs), where he held various positions in Bern and Pretoria, South Africa, before being transferred to New York in 1996 as Deputy Permanent Observer at the Swiss Mission to the United Nations. In 2000, he was appointed Ambassador and head of the division in charge of human security at the headquarters of Switzerland's Foreign Ministry in Berne.

In 2004, Maurer was appointed Ambassador and Permanent Representative of Switzerland to the United Nations in New York. In this position, he endeavoured to integrate Switzerland, which had only recently joined the United Nations, into multilateral networks. In June 2009, the United Nations General Assembly elected Maurer Chairman of the Fifth Committee, in charge of United Nations administrative and budgetary affairs. In addition, he was elected Chairman of the Burundi Configuration of the UN Peacebuilding Commission. In January 2010, Maurer became Switzerland's State Secretary for Foreign Affairs, a position he held until he was elected President of the ICRC, succeeding Jakob Kellenberger in June 2012.

Maurer led the ICRC through a historic budget increase, from 1.1 billion CHF in 2011 to over 1.6 billion CHF in 2015. In addition, he launched the world's first "humanitarian impact bond" scheme, in which private investors lend €22 million of five-year funding and their repayments depend on what difference the project makes to its clients' lives.

Since 2019, Maurer has been co-chairing the World Economic Forum High-Level Group on Humanitarian Investing, alongside Børge Brende and Kristalina Georgieva.

In September 2019, he was re-elected as the president of the ICRC for an additional term of 4 years, until October 2022, when he was succeeded by Mirjana Spoljaric Egger.

While president of the ICRC, Maurer earned an annual salary of up to CHF 437,000, while the ICRC was facing significant budget cuts.

== Other activities ==
- International Gender Champions (IGC), Member (since 2017)
- World Economic Forum (WEF), Member of the Board (since 2014)
- World Economic Forum (WEF), Co-Chair of the Global Future Council on the Future of the Humanitarian System
- International Institute for Strategic Studies (IISS), Member of the Advisory Council

== Awards and honours ==
- 2014 Honorary doctorate, University of Basel
- 2018 Honorary doctorate, Waseda University
- 2023 Knight Commander's Cross of the Order of Merit of the Federal Republic of Germany
- 2023 Grand Cordon of the Order of the Rising Sun

== Sources ==
- UN, 15 September 2009. PETER MAURER OF SWITZERLAND CHAIR OF FIFTH COMMITTEE
- ICRC, 19 October 2011. ICRC names new president
- ICRC, 7 September 2012. Syria: ICRC president concludes visit amid relentless fighting
- WEF, 3 November 2014. Peter Maurer Joins Foundation Board, World Economic Forum
