= Ruine Pernegg =

Castle ruin in Austria

- Styria, Austria
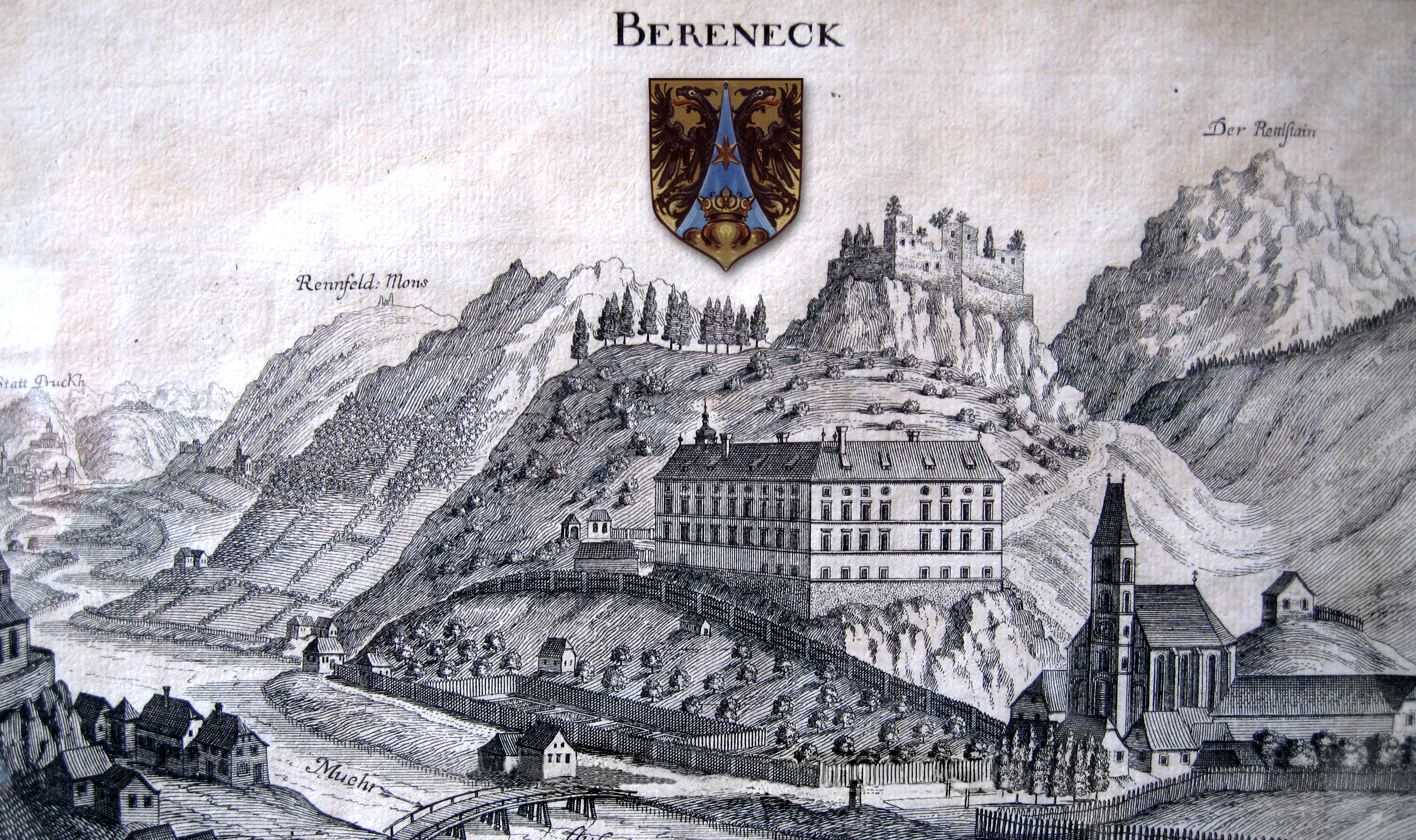

Site information
- Type: Castle

Site history
- Built: 12th century

Ruine Pernegg is a castle in Styria, Austria.

== See also ==
- List of castles in Austria
- VR-Tour through the castle ruins on burgen.erhartc.net
