= Ruine Ligist =

Castle in Austria

Coordinates: 46.996°N 15.206°E

- Styria, Austria
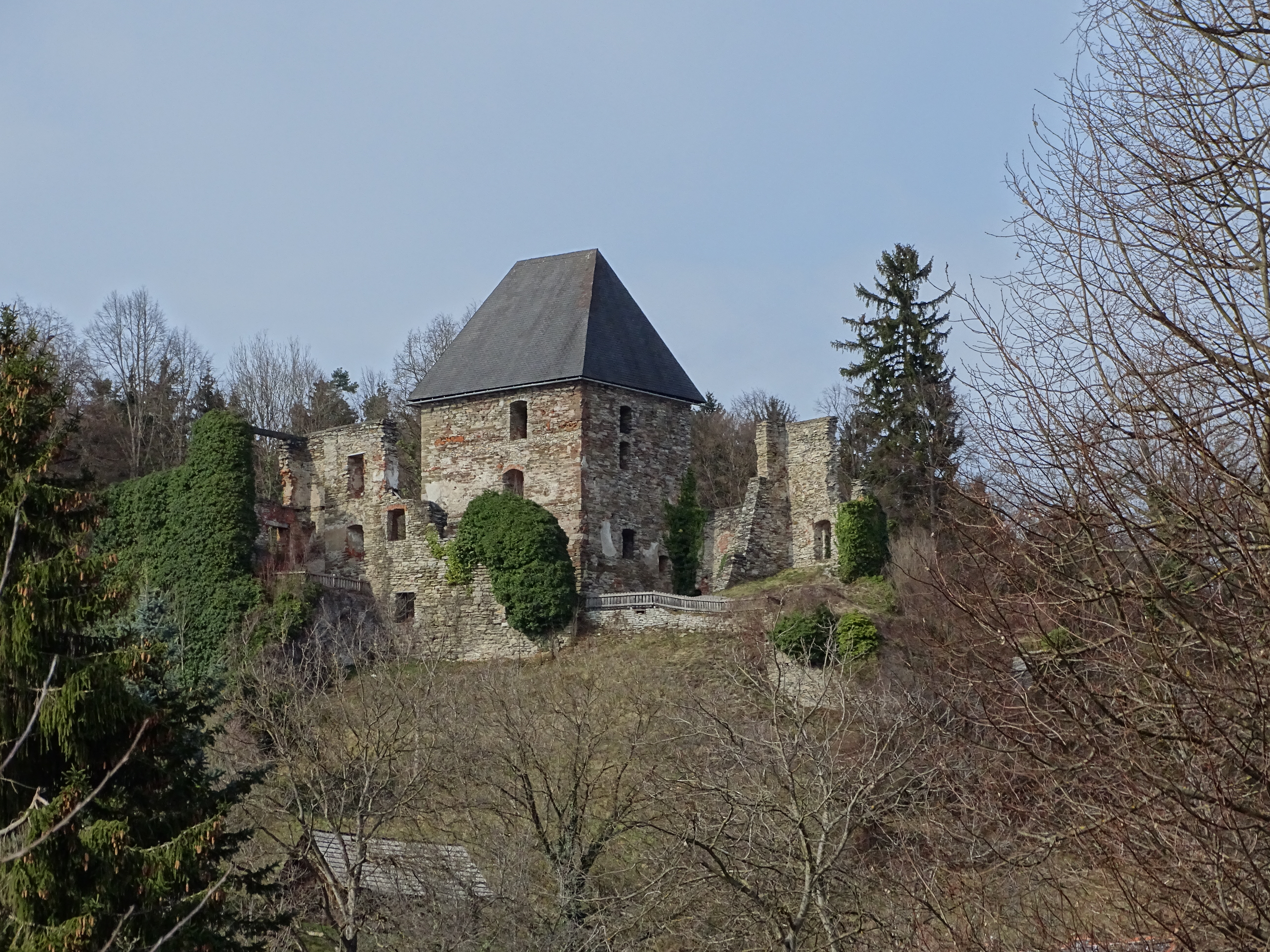

Site information
- Type: Hilltop castle

Site history
- Built: 12th century

Ruine Ligist is a castle in Styria, Austria. Ruine Ligist is situated at an elevation of 386 m.

== See also ==
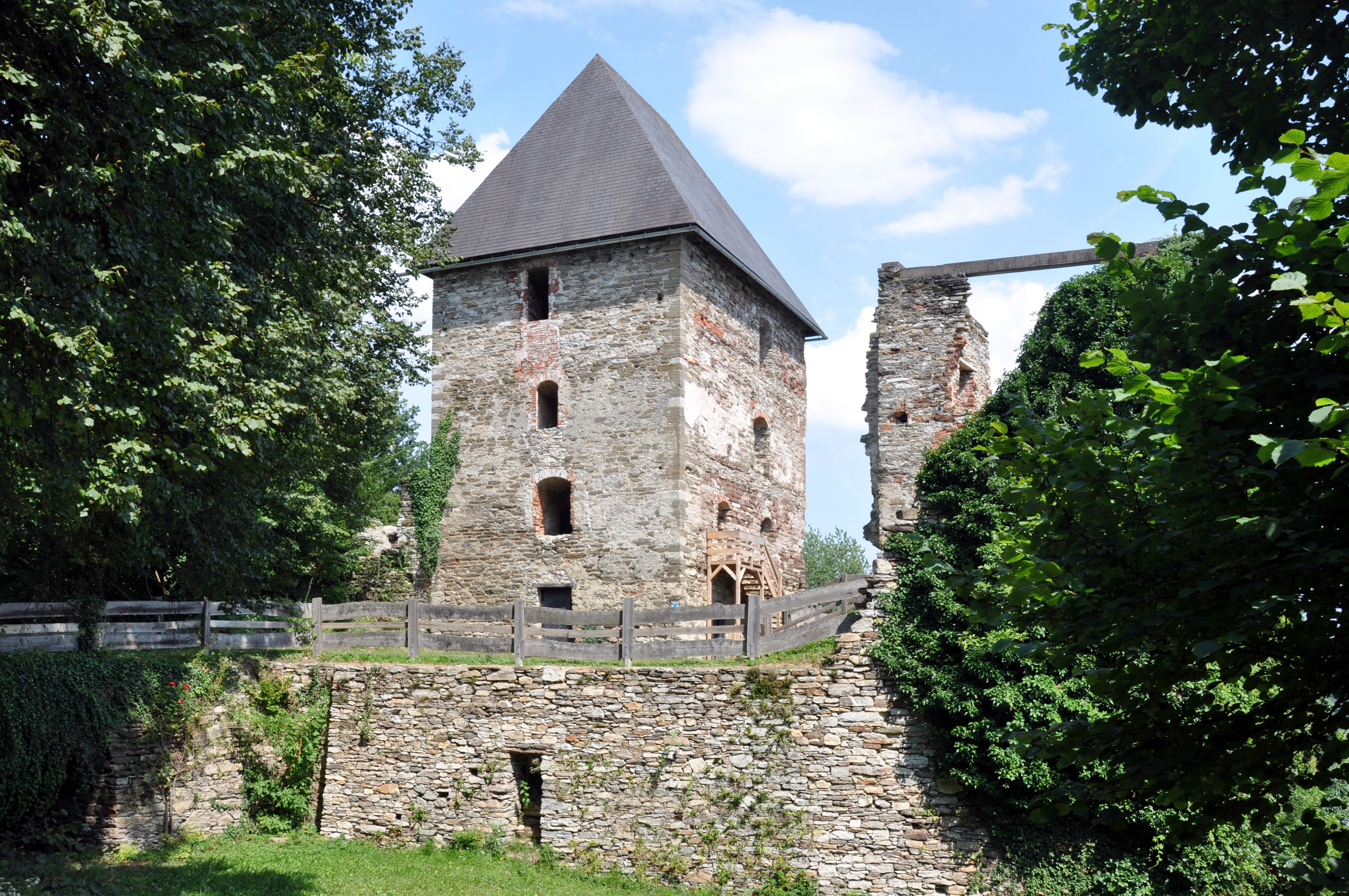
- Castle keep
  List of castles in Austria
