= Rudolf Stähelin =

Swiss internist

Rudolf Stähelin, surname also spelled Staehelin (28 July 1875 in Basel – 26 March 1943 in Basel) was a Swiss internist.

He studied medicine at the University of Basel, the University of Tübingen, and the Ludwig-Maximilians-Universität München, obtaining his doctorate at the University of Basel in 1901. He briefly served as an assistant physician at the Civic Hospital in Basel, then was a lecturer at the University of Basel (from 1902), the University of Göttingen (1906), and the Friedrich Wilhelm University of Berlin (from 1907). From 1911 until 1943, he was a professor of internal medicine and director of the medical clinic at the University of Basel.

His research involved studies on tuberculosis, respiratory, circulatory, metabolic and infectious diseases. With Gustav von Bergmann, he published the second edition of the Handbuch der inneren Medizin (1925-1931).

== Selected works ==
- Fortschritte der Hochgebirgsphysiologie, 1929 – On high altitude physiology.
- Spezielle Pathologie und Therapie der Infektionskrankheiten, 1934 – Special pathology and therapy for infectious diseases.
- Pro et Contra der Sulfanilamidtherapie, 1942 – Pros and cons associated with sulfanilamide therapy.
- Ermüdung und Krankheit, 1942 – Fatigue and disease.
