= Lucas Andrew Staehelin =

Swiss-American cell biologist (1939–2022)

- Born: February 10, 1939; Sydney, Australia
- Died: September 28, 2022 (aged 83)
- Citizenship: Switzerland, United States
- Known for: Cell biology, photosynthesis, electron microscopy
- Title: Professor emeritus

Academic background
- Education: Swiss Federal Institute of Technology

Lucas Andrew Staehelin (February 10, 1939 – September 28, 2022) was a Swiss-American cell biologist. He was professor emeritus at the University of Colorado Boulder.

He developed cryofixation methods and pioneered their use for preserving cellular structures for electron microscope studies. Application of these methods to the analysis of plant, animal and bacterial cells brought insights into the nanoscale architecture and functional organization of membranous organelles and cytoskeletal systems. Staehelin taught undergraduate and graduate courses in cellular and molecular biology at the University of Colorado Boulder.

== Early life and education ==
Staehelin was born in Sydney, Australia on February 10, 1939. In 1948 he moved to Switzerland where he attended the Gymnasium in Bern. He studied natural sciences as an undergraduate at the Swiss Federal Institute of Technology, Zürich from 1959 to 1963, where he earned his doctorate in plant cell biology in 1966, studying in the laboratory of Kurt Mühlethaler. From 1966 to 1969 he worked as a scientist at the Physics and Engineering Laboratory of the Department of Scientific and Industrial Research in New Zealand. He was a postdoctoral fellow from 1969 to 1970 at Harvard University.

== Career ==
Staehelin became an assistant professor in the Department of Molecular, Cellular and Developmental Biology, University of Colorado Boulder, in 1970, was promoted to associate professor in 1973, to full professor in 1978, and to professor emeritus in 2006. He held visiting professorships at Albert-Ludwigs University (1978), Swiss Federal Institute of Technology (1984, 1992), and the University of Melbourne (1998).

He has authored and co-authored more than 300 scientific publications (H-Index 78).

== Research ==
Staehelin's research focused on using cryofixation methods to produce improved images of cellular structures by means of freeze-fracture, thin section and immunolabeling electron microscopy, and by electron tomography techniques. His studies of photosynthetic membranes led to the characterization of differences in structure and function of grana and stroma thylakoid membranes, of chlorosomes, and the attachment of plastoglobules to thylakoids. Vitrification of plant cells using propane-jet freezing led to the discovery that cellulose fibrils were synthesized by plasma membrane-associated rosette particle complexes, and the demonstration that vesicle-mediated secretion and membrane recycling in turgid cells involves characteristic, transient membrane configurations. High-pressure freezing of intact plant tissues led to new models of plant cytokinesis, first as seen in thin section images and then by electron tomography. These studies led to the discovery of the cell plate assembly matrix within which the assembly of the cell plate from vesicles occurs by previously unknown mechanisms. Electron tomography analysis enabled his group to produce nanoscale models of endoplasmic reticulum, Golgi apparatus and trans Golgi network membranes The Golgi matrix/scaffold was shown to originate on COPII vesicles and to capture passing Golgi to mediate ER-Golgi vesicle transfer as postulated by the stop-pluck-and-go hypothesis of Golgi trafficking.

== Awards ==
- Recipient of the Alexander von Humboldt Research Award (1977)
- Member of the German National Academy of Sciences Leopoldina (1994)
- Fellow of the American Association for the Advancement of Science (2005)
- Recipient of the Haselkorn Scholar Award, University of Chicago (2006)
- First named Fellow of the American Society of Plant Physiologists (2007)
