= Ruine Liechtenstein =

Castle ruin in Austria

Coordinates: 47°10′N 14°40′E

- Styria, Austria
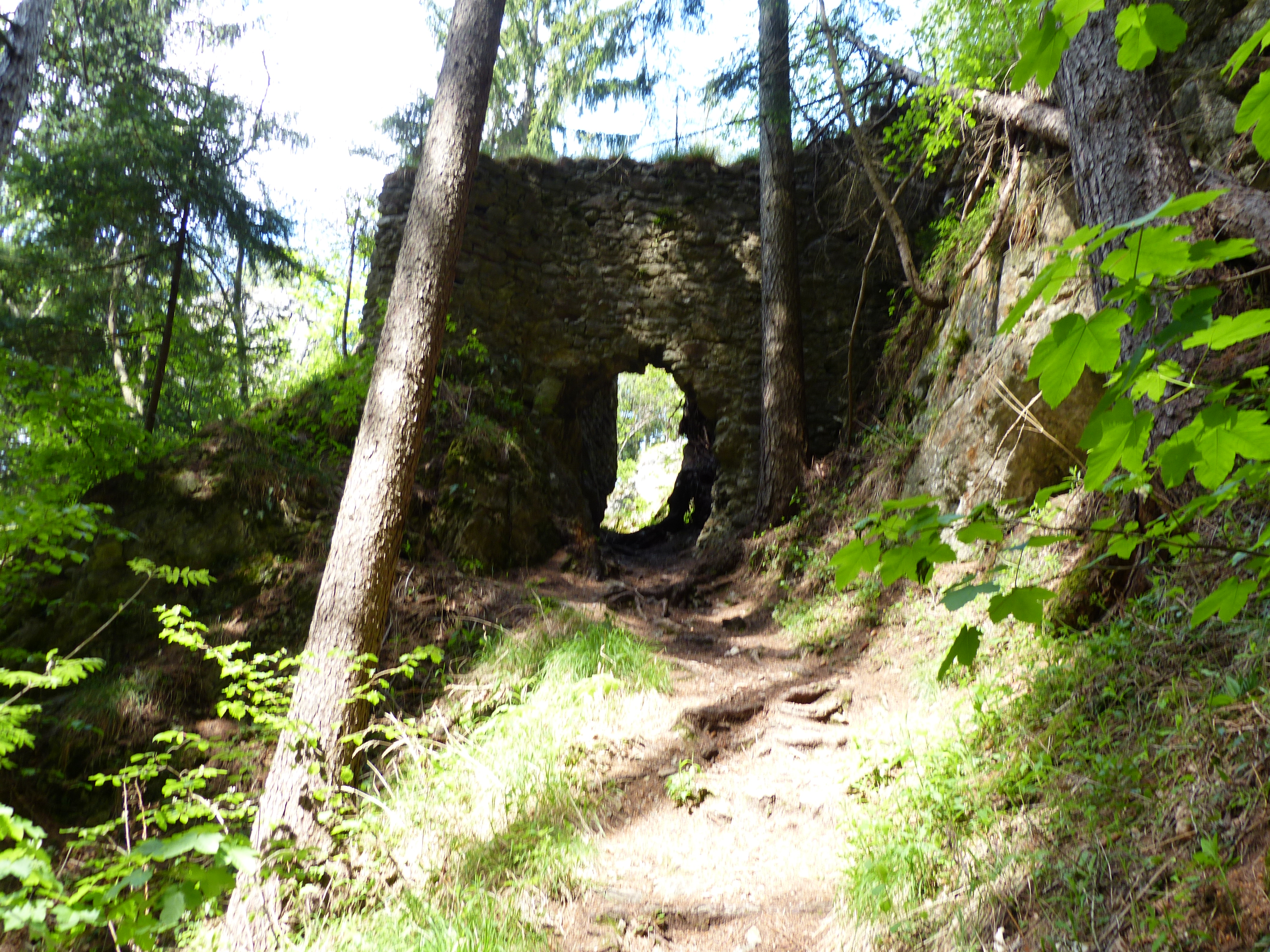

Site information
- Type: Castle

Ruine Liechtenstein is a castle in Styria, Austria. Ruine Liechtenstein is situated at an elevation of 852 m.

== See also ==
- List of castles in Austria
