= Ruine Henneberg =

Castle ruin in Austria

Coordinates: 50.491°N 10.361°E

- Styria, Austria

Site information
- Type: Hilltop castle

Site history
- Built: 1147
- Built by: Konrad von Feistritz

Ruine Henneberg is a Romanesque castle in Styria, Austria.

== See also ==
- List of castles in Austria
- VR-Tour through the castle ruins on burgen.erhartc.net
