= Ruine Neu-Leonroth =

Castle in Styria, Austria

- Styria, Austria
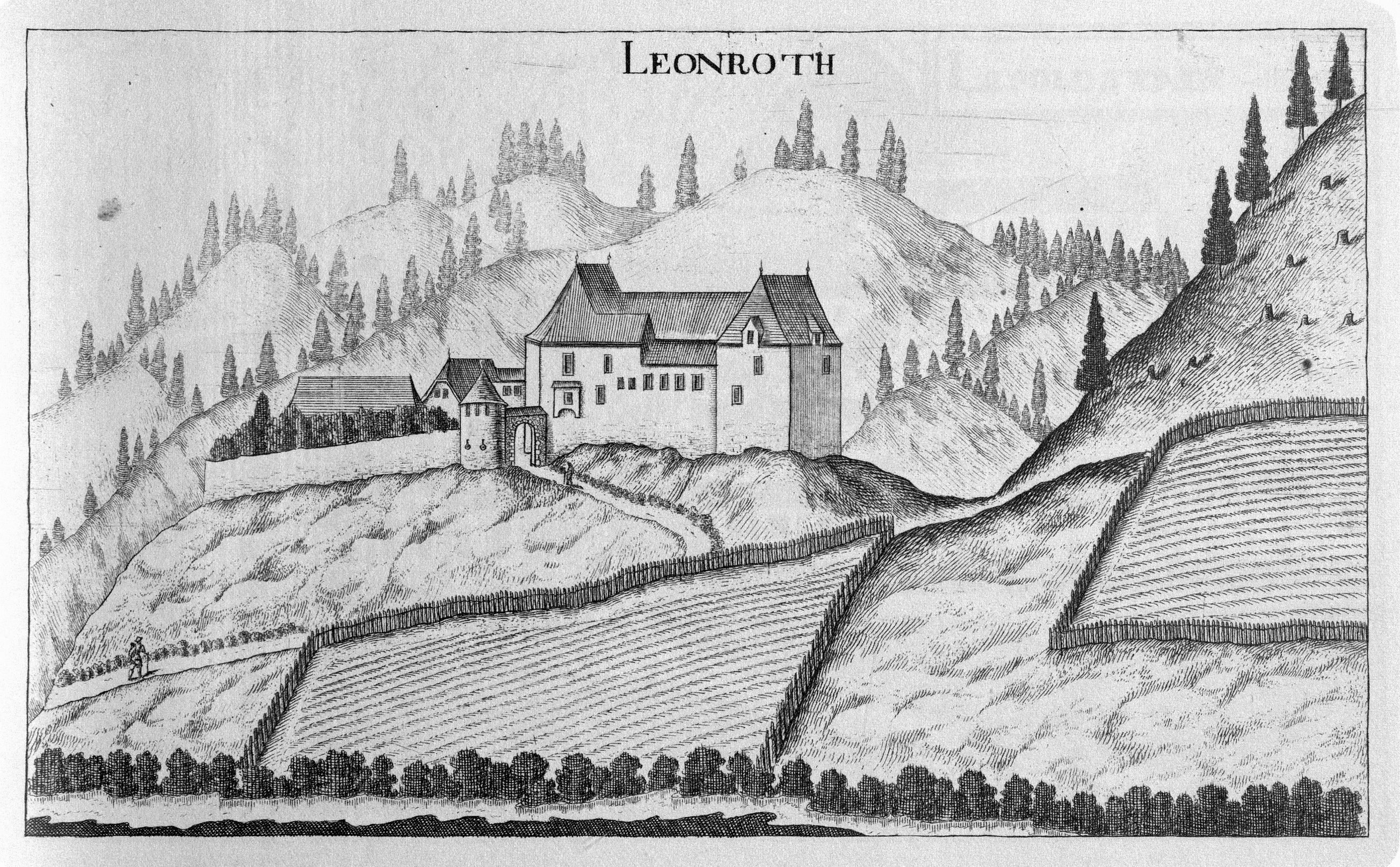

Site information
- Type: Hill castle

Location
- Coordinates: 47°1′30″N 15°8′43″E

Site history
- Built: turn from 13th to 14th century

Ruine Neu-Leonroth is a castle in Styria, Austria.

== See also ==
- List of castles in Austria
- VR-Tour through the castle ruins on burgen.erhartc.net
