= Ruine Klöch =

Castle in Austria

Coordinates: 46°46′01″N 15°58′03″E

- Styria, Austria
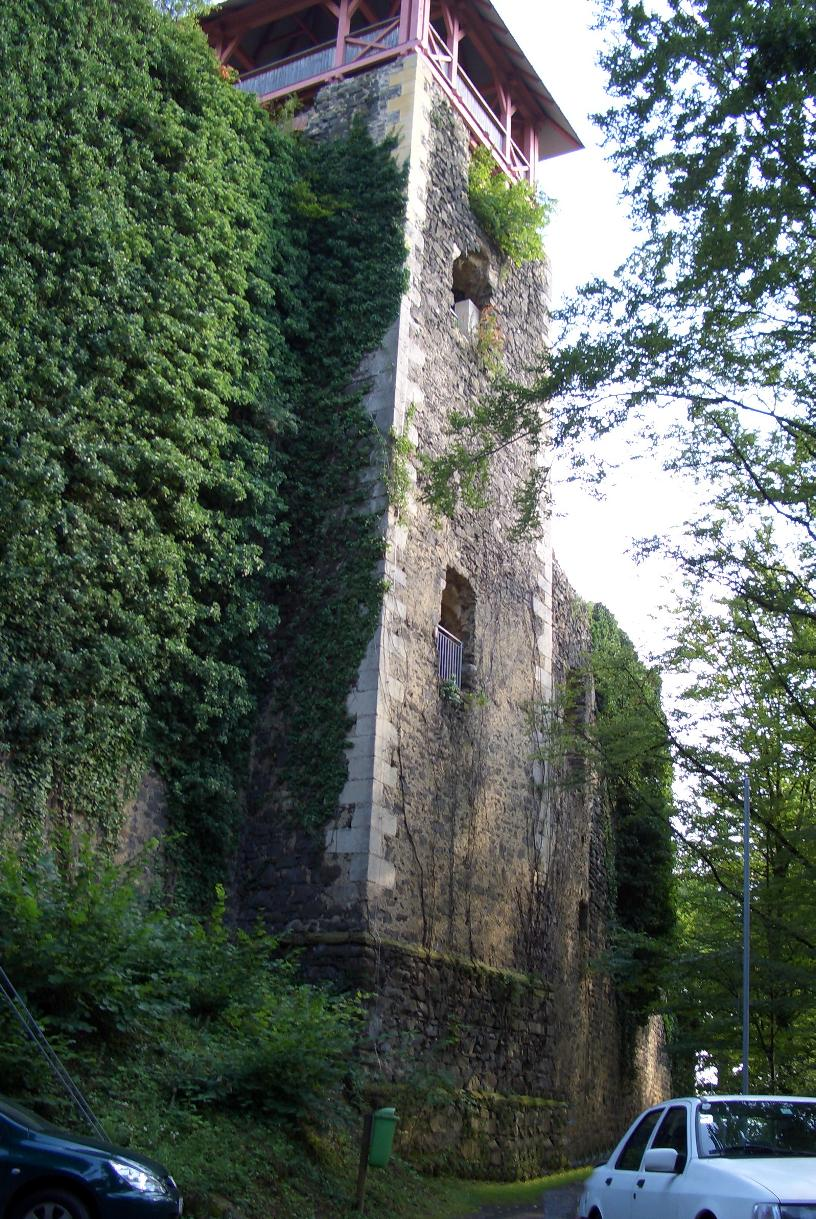

Site information
- Type: Castle

Ruine Klöch is a castle in Styria, Austria.

== See also ==
- List of castles in Austria
