= Jenö Staehelin =

Swiss diplomat and lawyer

Jenö Staehelin PhD
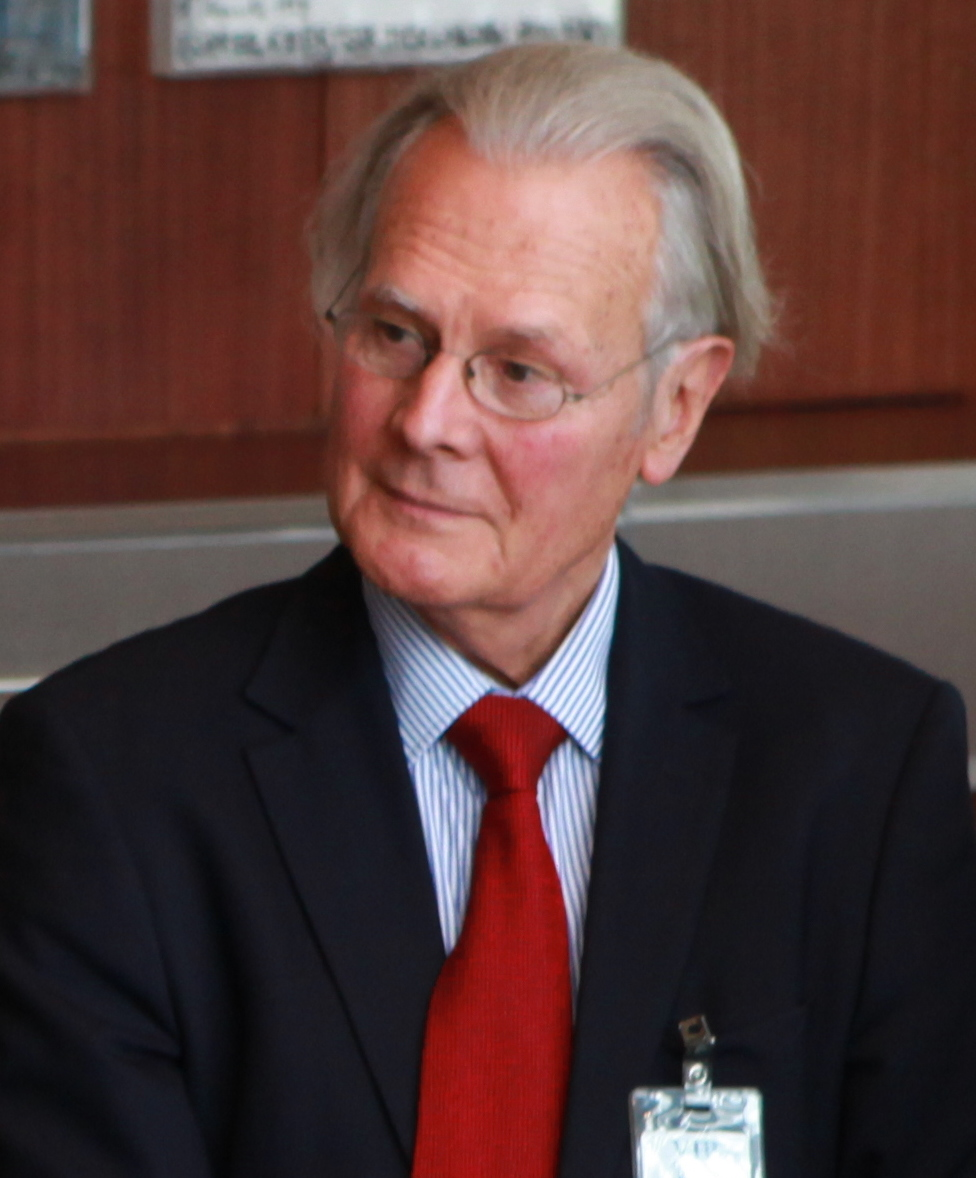
- Staehelin, c. 2015
- Born: Jenö C.A. Staehelin; 14 January 1940 (age 86); Basel, Switzerland
- Years active: 2002-2004
- Known for: First Permanent Representative of Switzerland to the United Nations
- Relatives: Staehelin family
- Website: Official website

Jenö Staehelin (born 14 January 1940) is a Swiss diplomat and lawyer. He was the first Swiss Permanent Representative to the United Nations in New York from 2002 to 2004, and president of the UNICEF Executive Board at the international level in 2003. He was Vice President of the European Patent Office in Munich from 1977 to 1984. He was the Swiss Ambassador to Japan from 1993 to 1997. Staehelin studied at the Graduate Institute of International and Development Studies in Geneva, an LLM from Harvard Law School, and a doctor of law from University of Bern.
