= Alexander Ellinger =

German chemist and pharmacologist

Alexander Ellinger (17 April 1870 in Frankfurt am Main – 26 July 1923 in Frankfurt am Main) was a German chemist and pharmacologist.

From 1887, he studied chemistry at the Friedrich Wilhelm University of Berlin under August Wilhelm von Hofmann and at the University of Bonn as a pupil of August Kekulé. Afterwards, he studied medicine at the Ludwig-Maximilians-Universität München, followed by work as an assistant in the institute of pharmacology at the University of Strasbourg. In 1897, he became an assistant to Max Jaffé in the laboratory of medicinal chemistry and experimental pharmacology at the University of Königsberg. In 1914, he was appointed professor of pharmacology at the newly established University of Frankfurt am Main.

He is remembered for his extensive biochemical research of several amino acids, especially tryptophan. In 1904, he isolated kynurenic acid from the urine of dogs that had been fed tryptophan. His other work included studies on the water exchange between body tissues and blood, on the formation on lymph, and with chemist Karl Spiro, he conducted investigations of blood coagulation.

== Partial bibliography ==
- Ellinger, Alexander (1903). "Die Indolbildung und Indicanausscheidung beim hungernden Kaninchen". Hoppe-Seyler's Zeitschrift für physiologische Chemie. 39 (1): 44–54. doi:10.1515/bchm2.1903.39.1.44. ISSN 0018-4888.
- Ellinger, Alexander (1904). "Ueber die Constitution der Indolgruppe im Eiweiss (Synthese der sogen. Skatolcarbonsäure) und die Quelle der Kynurensäure". Berichte der Deutschen Chemischen Gesellschaft. 37 (2): 1801–1808. doi:10.1002/cber.19040370294. ISSN 0365-9496.
- Ellinger, Alexander (1905). "Ueber die Constitution der Indolgruppe im Eiweiss. II. Mittheilung: Synthese der Indol-Pr-3-propionsäure. (Nencki's Skatolessigsäure)". Berichte der Deutschen Chemischen Gesellschaft. 38 (3): 2884–2888. doi:10.1002/cber.19050380392. ISSN 0365-9496.
- Ellinger, Alexander (1906). "Ueber die Constitution der Indolgruppe im Eiweiss. III. Mittheilung: Oxydation des Tryptophans zu β- Indolaldehyd". Berichte der Deutschen Chemischen Gesellschaft. 39 (3): 2515–2522. doi:10.1002/cber.19060390331. ISSN 0365-9496.
- Ellinger, Alexander (1907). "Die Chemie der Eiweissfäulnis". Ergebnisse der Physiologie. 6 (1): 29–57. doi:10.1007/BF02321047. ISSN 0303-4240. S2CID 100927307.
