= Ruine Offenburg =

Castle ruin in Austria

- Styria, Austria
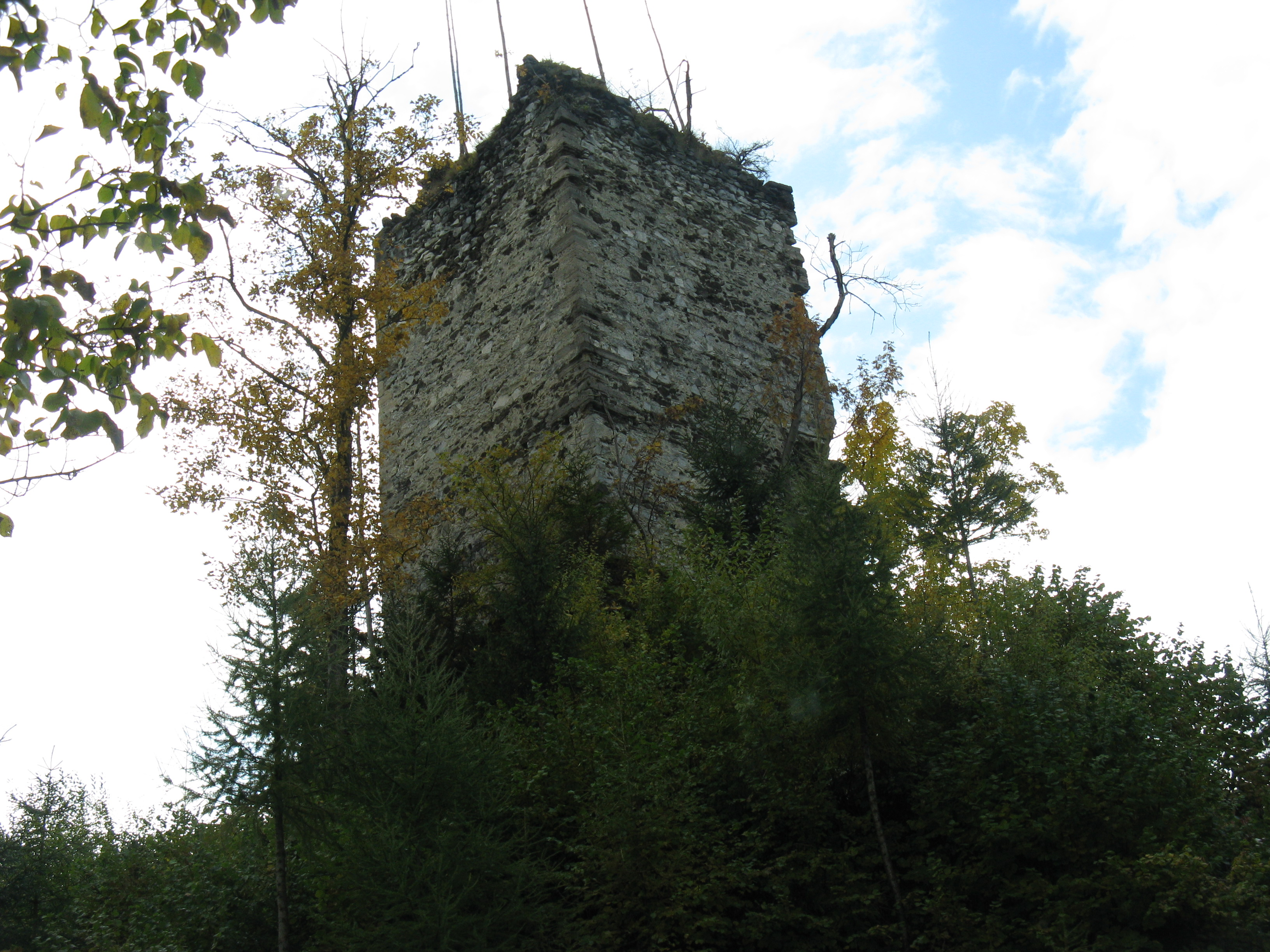

Site information
- Type: Hill castle

Location
- Coordinates: 47°14′1.0″N 14°35′45.6″E

Site history
- Built: 12th century

Ruine Offenburg is a castle in Styria, Austria. Ruine Offenburg is situated at an elevation of 166 m.

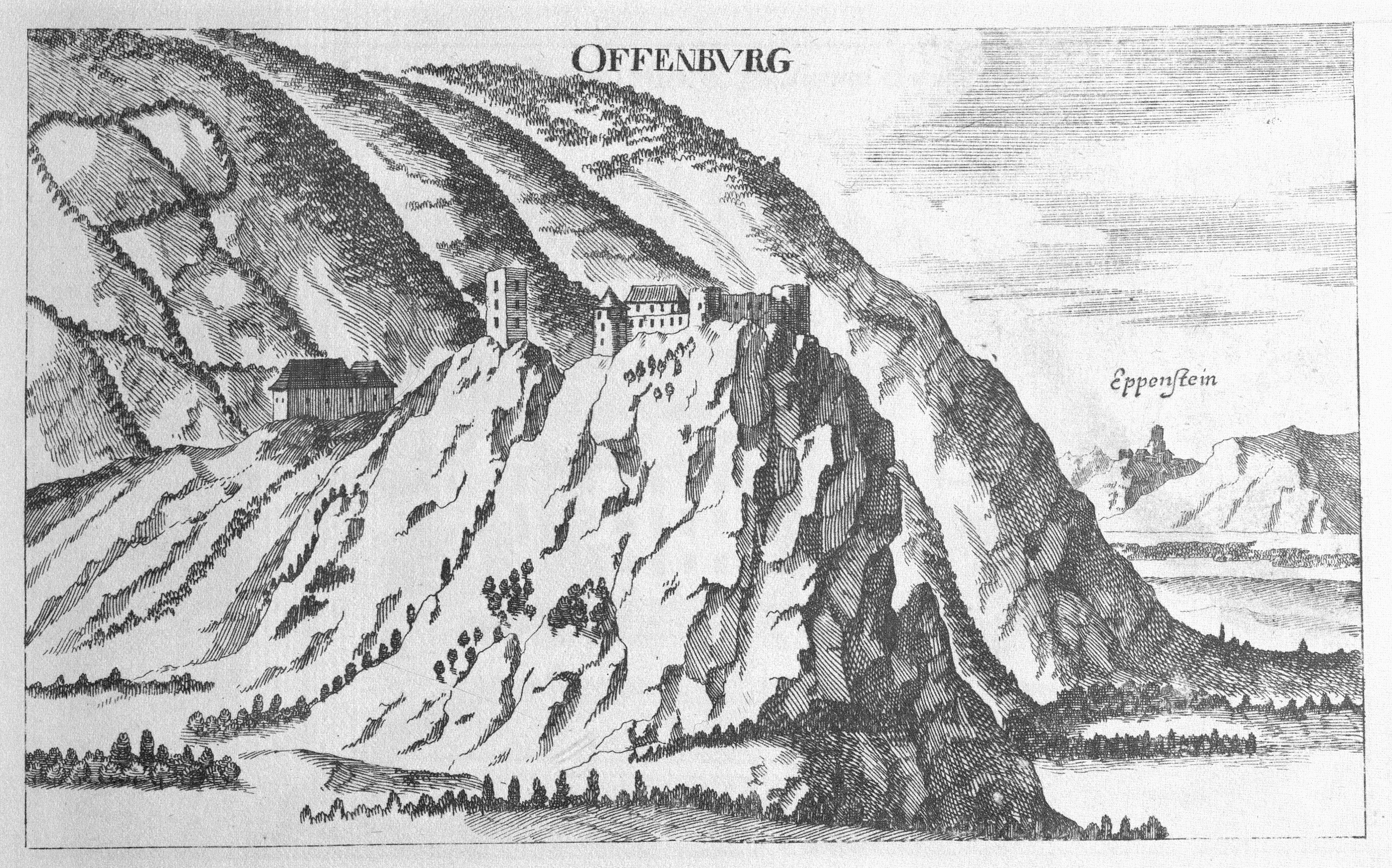
Offenburg Castle

== See also ==
- List of castles in Austria
