= Ruine Schmirnberg =

Castle ruin in Austria

Coordinates: 46.6319°N 15.4875°E

- Styria, Austria
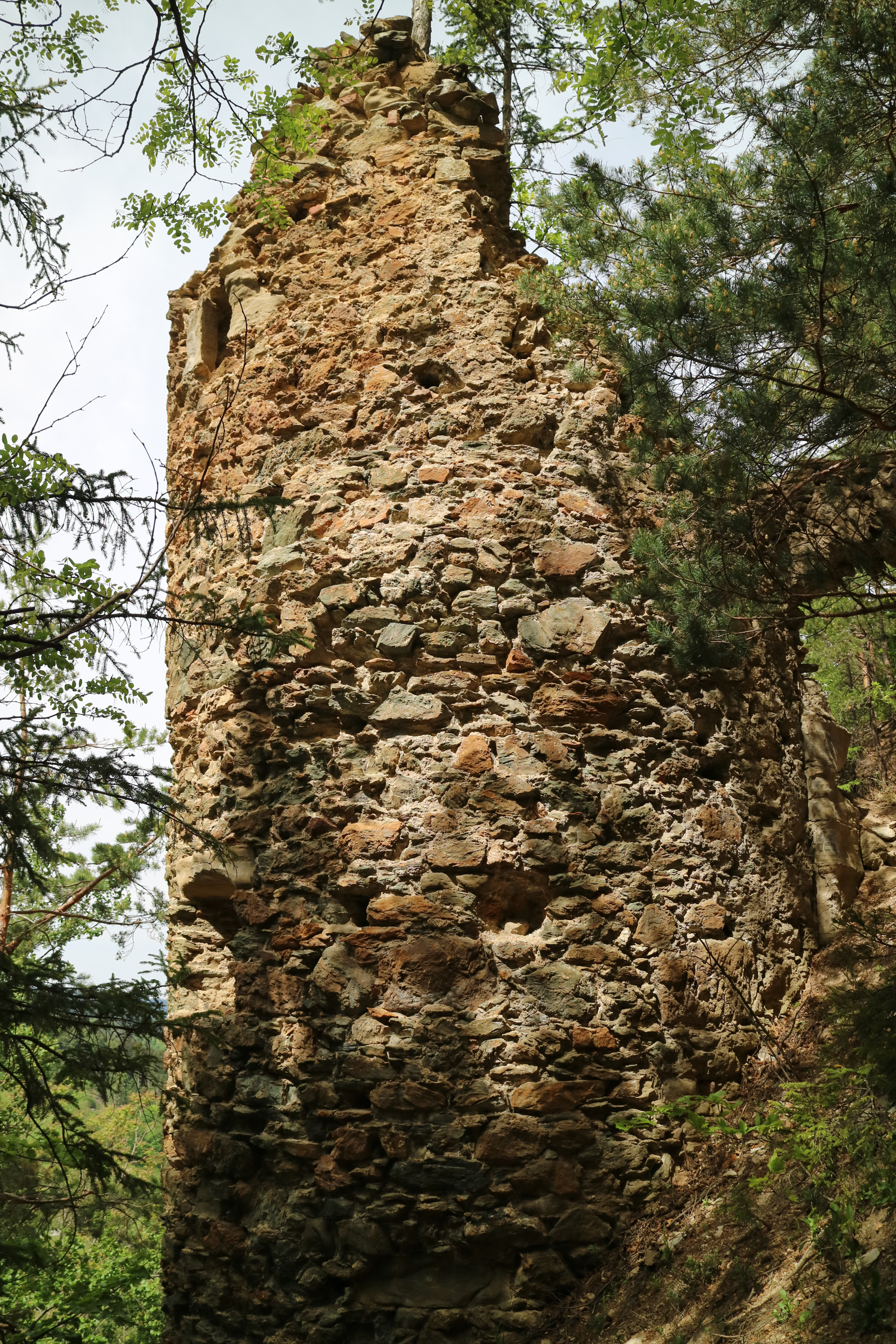

Site information
- Type: Hilltop castle

Site history
- Built: before 1100

Ruine Schmirnberg is a castle in Styria, Austria.

It is first mentioned around 1250 as one of the strongest fortifications in the Pößnitz and Seggau area. It remained inhabited until the end of the 18th century and by 1822 had fallen into ruin. In 1912 the ruins came into the ownership of the Czerweny-Arland family.

== See also ==
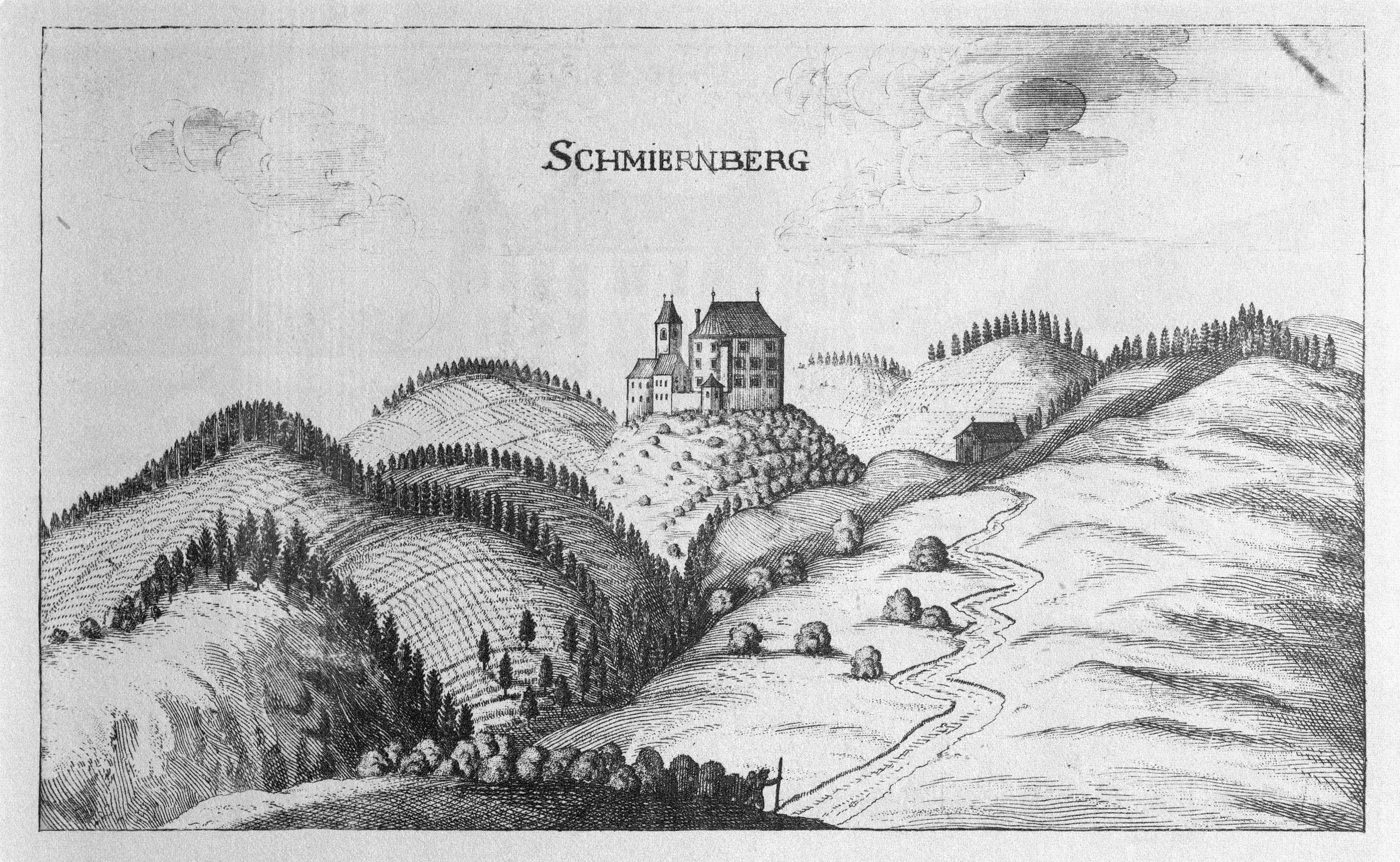
- Schmiernberg Castle
  List of castles in Austria
