= Gustav von Bergmann =

German physician (1878–1955)

- Born: 24 December 1878; Würzburg, Germany
- Died: 16 September 1955 (aged 76)
- Citizenship: German
- Occupation: Internist

Gustav von Bergmann (24 December 1878 – 16 September 1955) was a German internist born in Würzburg. He was the son of renowned surgeon Ernst von Bergmann (1836–1907).

== Education ==
In 1903, he received his doctorate at the University of Strasbourg, and afterwards worked at the second medical hospital in Berlin under Friedrich Kraus. In 1916, he became a full professor of internal medicine at Marburg University, and later a professor at the University of Frankfurt am Main (from 1920), the Berlin Charité (from 1927) and the Ludwig-Maximilians-Universität München (from 1946).

== Career ==
He was a proponent of "functional pathology", and is considered to be one of the founders of psychosomatic medicine. His research involved investigations into gastro-intestinal ulcers, hypertension and studies of the autonomic nervous system. From 1994 to 2010, the Gustav-von-Bergmann-Medaille was the highest honor awarded by the German Society of Internal Medicine.

With Albrecht Bethe and Gustav Georg Embden, he was co-publisher of the multi-volume Handbuch der normalen und pathologischen Physiologie. With Rudolf Stähelin, he published the second edition of Handbuch der inneren Medizin. Other noted works of his include:

- Das vegetative Nervensystem und seine Störungen (The autonomic nervous system and its disorders). 1926.
- Funktionelle Pathologie (Functional pathology), 1932.
- Neues Denken in der Medizin (New reasoning in medicine), 1947.

He attended to physiologist Emil von Behring during the night prior to Behring's death of a pulmonary inflammation on March 31, 1917.
