= Ruine Hauenstein =

Castle ruin in Austria

- Styria, Austria
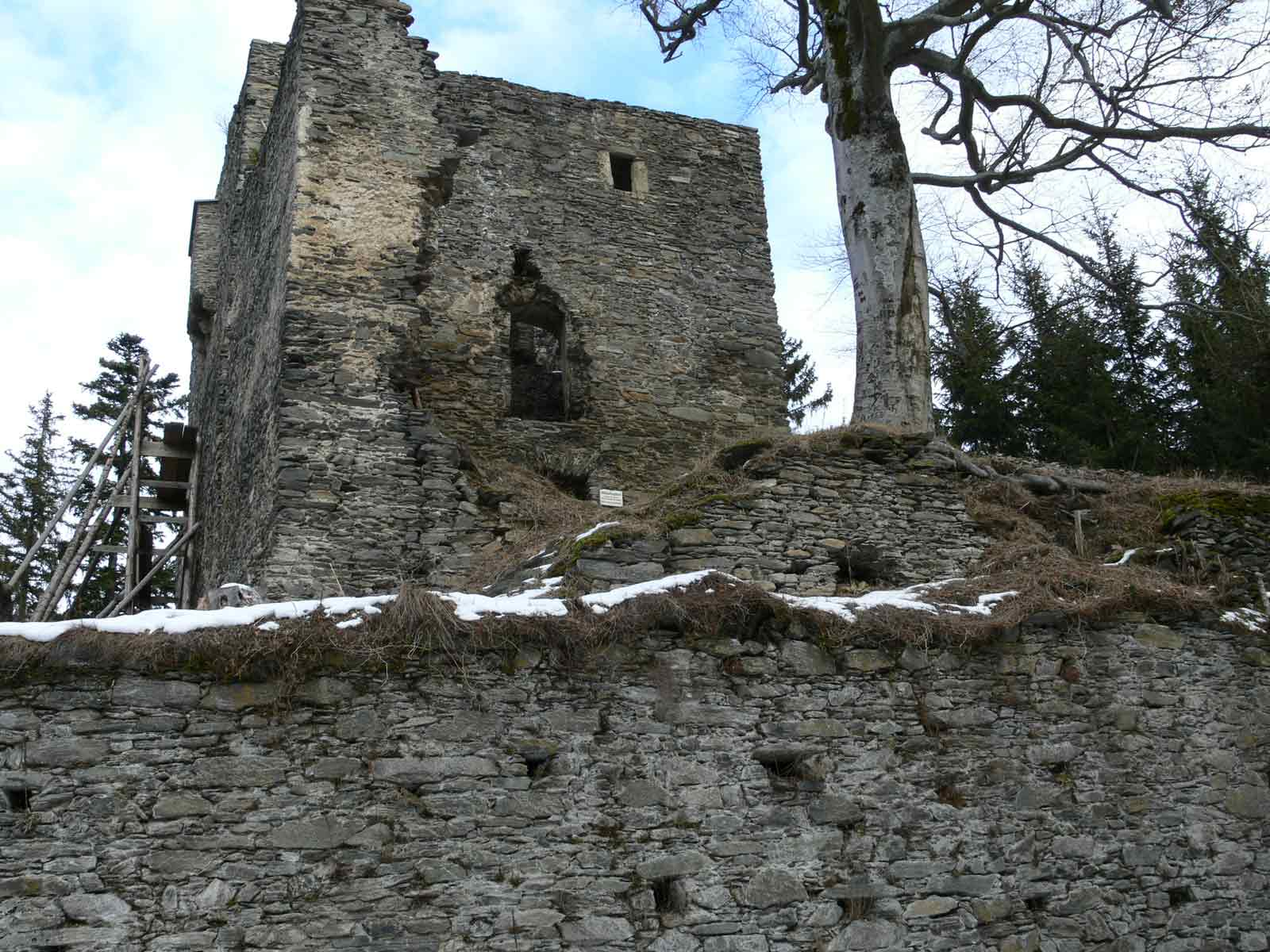

Site information
- Type: Castle

Location
- Coordinates: 47°11′26″N 15°4′31″E

Ruine Hauenstein is a castle in Styria, Austria. Ruine Hauenstein is situated at an elevation of 656 m.

== See also ==
- List of castles in Austria
