= Ruine Katsch =

Castle in Styria, Austria

- Styria, Austria
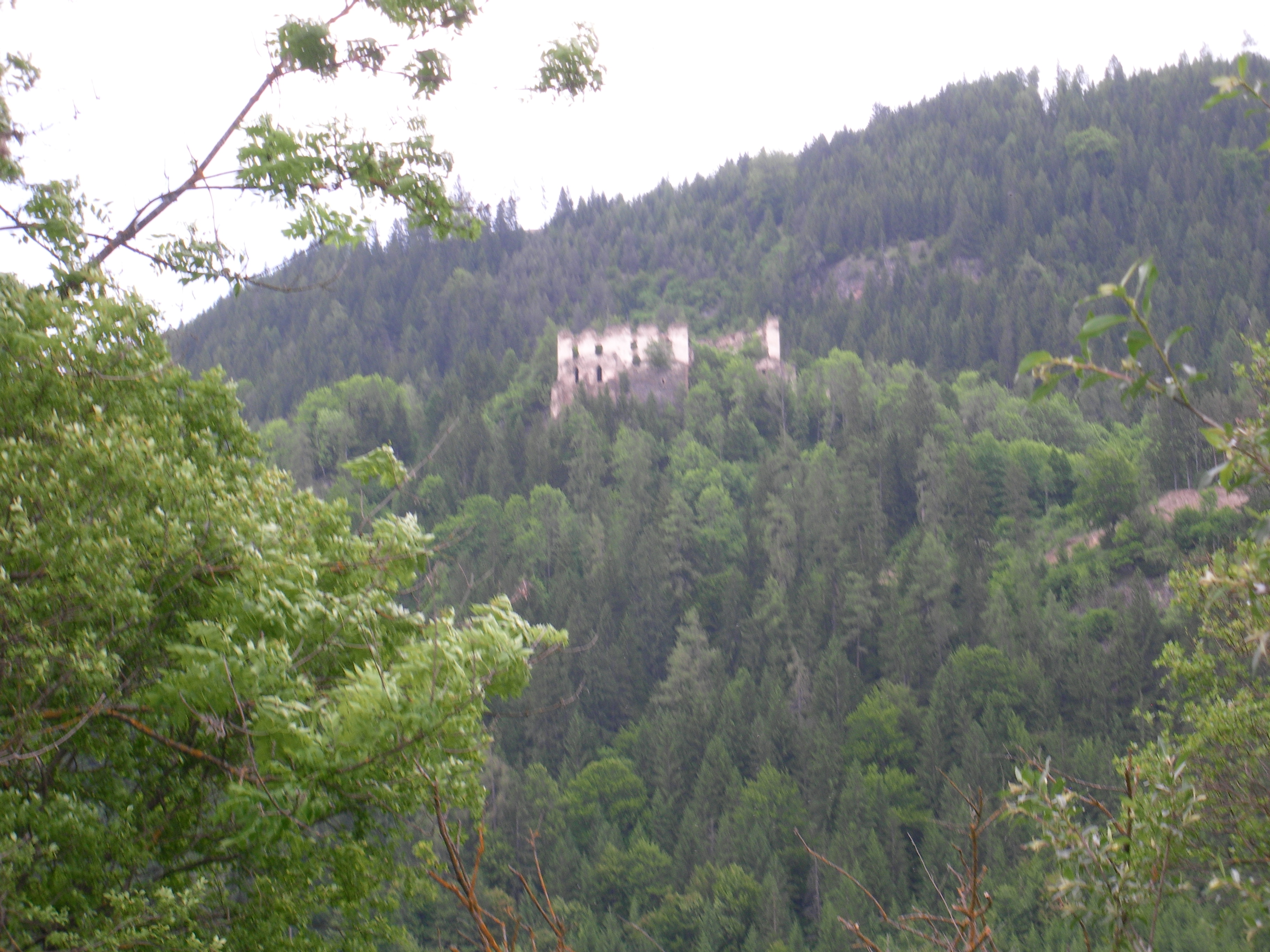

Site information
- Type: Castle

Location
- Coordinates: 47°8′43″N 14°17′16″E

Ruine Katsch is a castle in Styria, Austria. Ruine Katsch is situated at a height of 748 meters.

== See also ==
- List of castles in Austria
- VR-Tour through the castle ruins on burgen.erhartc.net

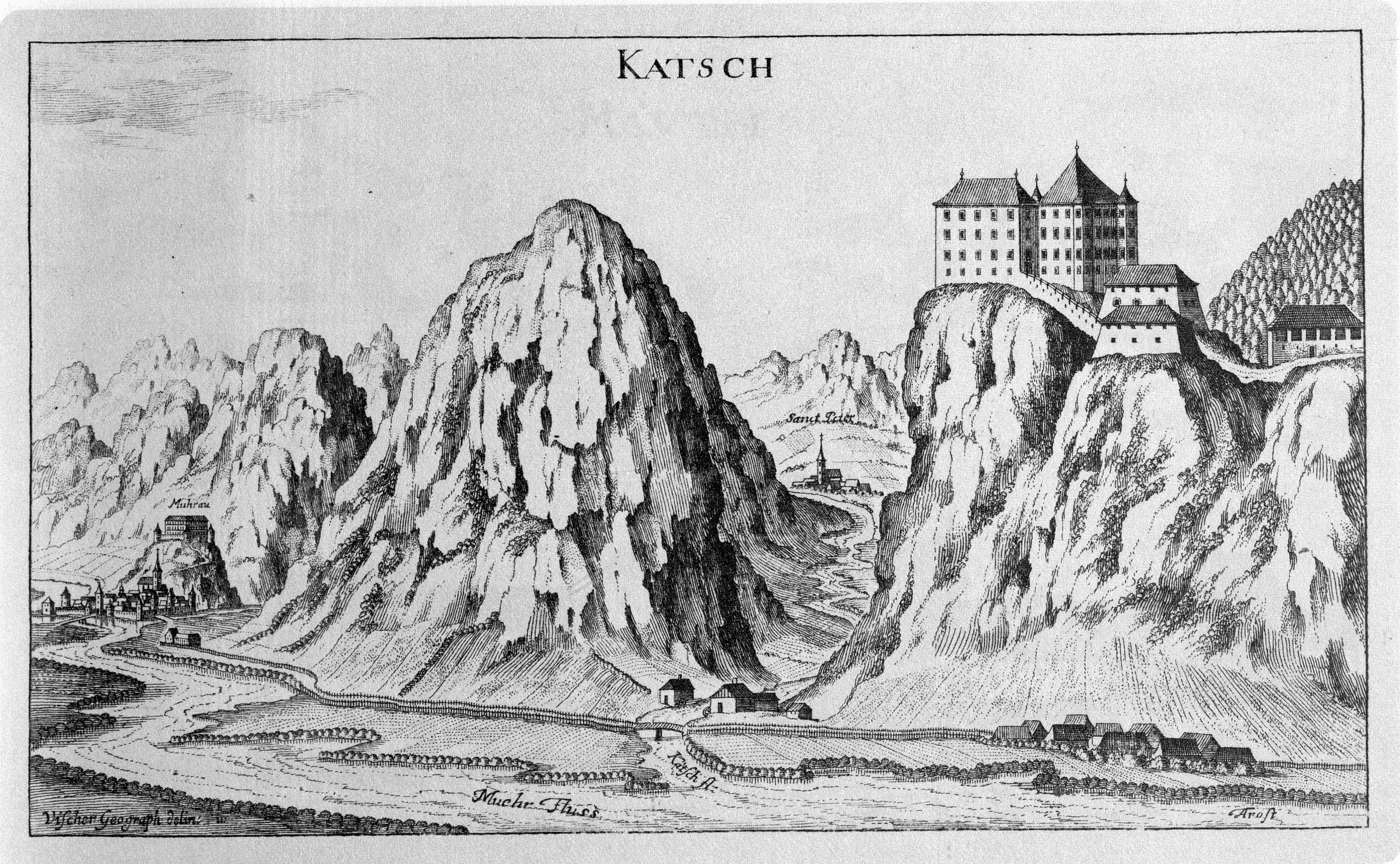
Katsch Castle
