= Burgruine Hardegg =

Castle ruins in Austria

- Carinthia, Austria
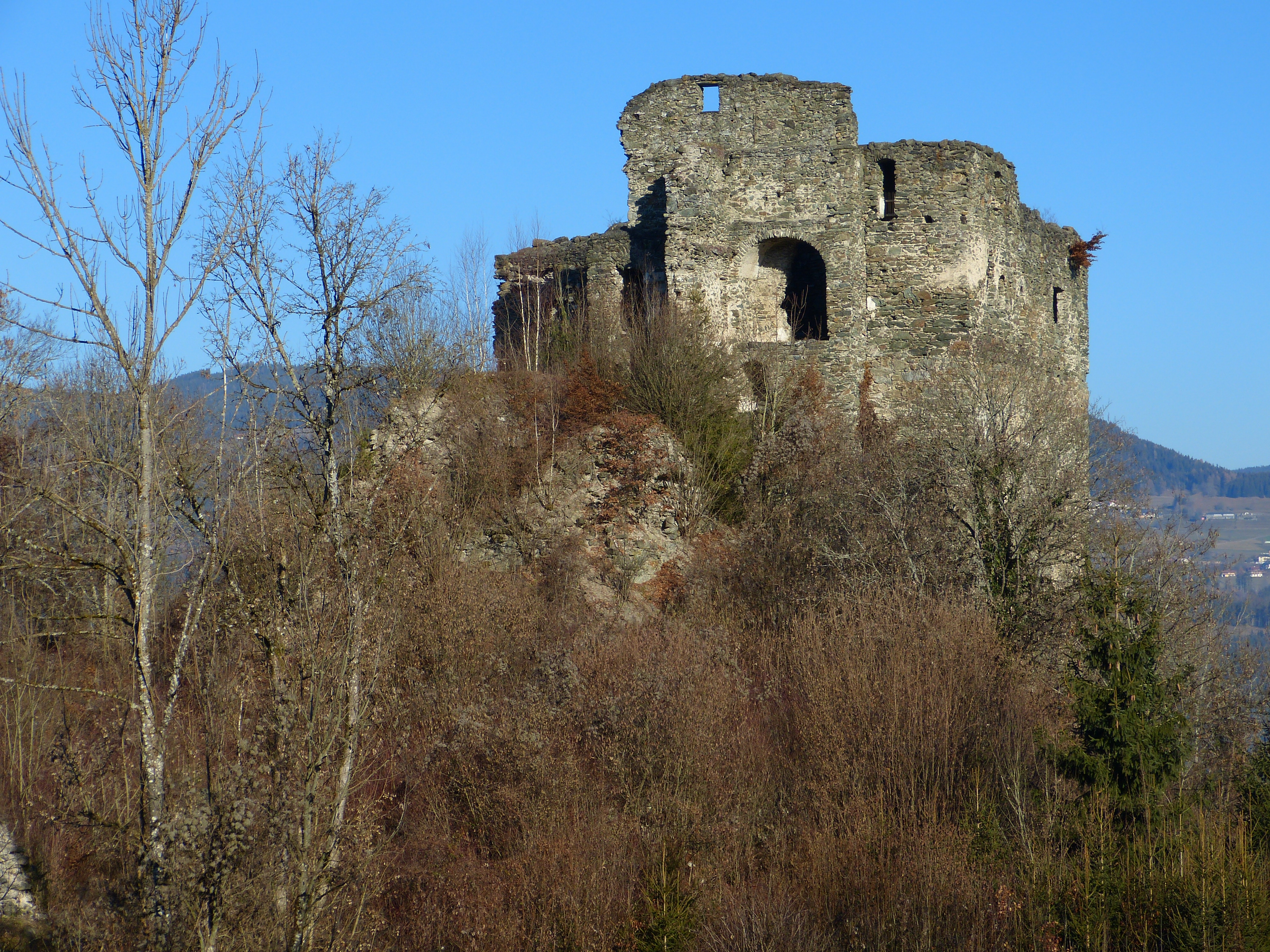

Site information
- Type: Castle

Location
- Coordinates: 46°43′02″N 14°15′29″E

Site history
- Built: before 1134

Burgruine Hardegg is a small Romanesque twin castle complex on a wooded hill north of the town of Zweikirchen in Carinthia, Austria. Nearby are the ruins of Liebenfels, Gradenegg and Liemberg, which, together with Hardegg, were among the main castles in the castle ring that surrounded the ducal capital of St. Veit.

The land on which the ruins are located is now privately owned by a farmer. Entering the ruins is prohibited due to the acute danger of collapse and the constantly loosening stones.

== History ==
Hardenegg was first mentioned in a document in 1134, when Mengotus de Hardeche et filius eius Gotpoldus were mentioned. His family died out in 1176 with Hertwig von Hardegg, a ministerialis of the Duke of Carinthia.

Seifried von Mahrenberg, a later owner of Hardegg, obtained it from the bishop of Bamberg in 1264 as a donation for the construction of a Cistercian monastery. However, the construction of the monastery did not materialize because Seifried died soon afterwards, but the castle remained in Bamberg until it was returned to the possession of the Carinthian dukes at the beginning of the 14th century.

In 1346 the castle was bestowed on Friedrich and Konrad von Auffenstein by Duke Albrecht of Austria, followed by the Khevenhüller family, and by the beginning of the 16th century the Leininger brothers were lords of the castle. In 1527 it came as a fief to the Carinthian mint master Hieronymus Puecher. This was followed by a rapid change of ownership, during which the castle fell into disrepair during the 17th century. The decline was possibly accelerated by the roof tax introduced in the 18th century.

== Architectural details ==
=== Main Castle ===
The castle, which was last rebuilt and expanded during the Renaissance, originally consisted of two mighty Romanesque towers that had been connected over time by residential buildings and formed a small courtyard with them. The forecourt with the drawbridge gate to the south of the castle can still be seen.

Thick-walled remains of the northeastern tower have been preserved, while the southwestern one has collapsed. The tower square was already occupied in prehistoric times, as recent archaeological finds show.

It is possible to see all of the "Four Mountains" (Magdalensberg, Ulrichsberg, Veitsberg, and Lorenziberg) and some fortified structures (e.g. Burgruine Hohenstein Castle, Taggenbrunn Castle, Burgruine Liemberg Castle, and Karlsberg Castle) from the upper floors of the castle.

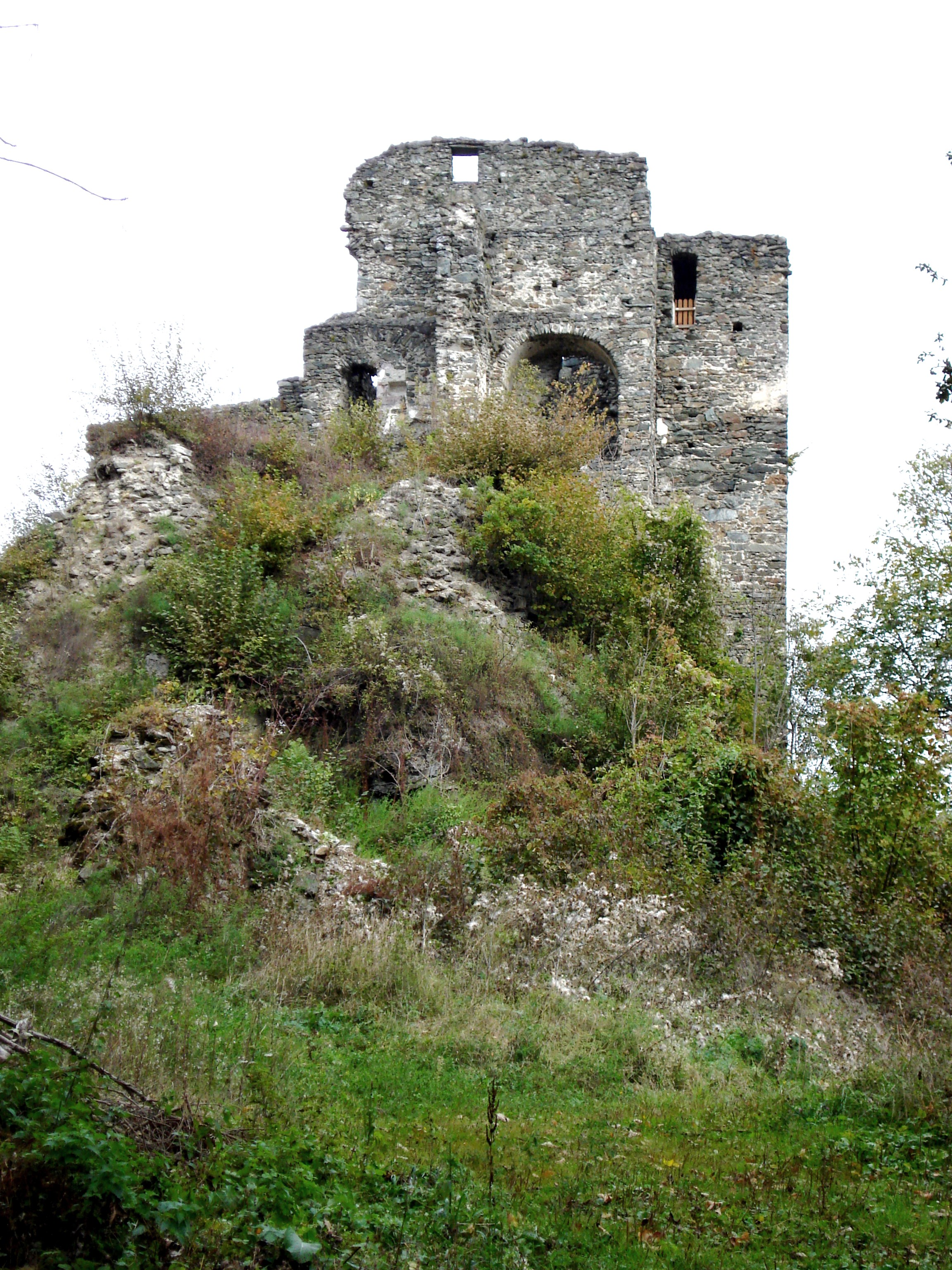
Burgruine Hardegg (2009)

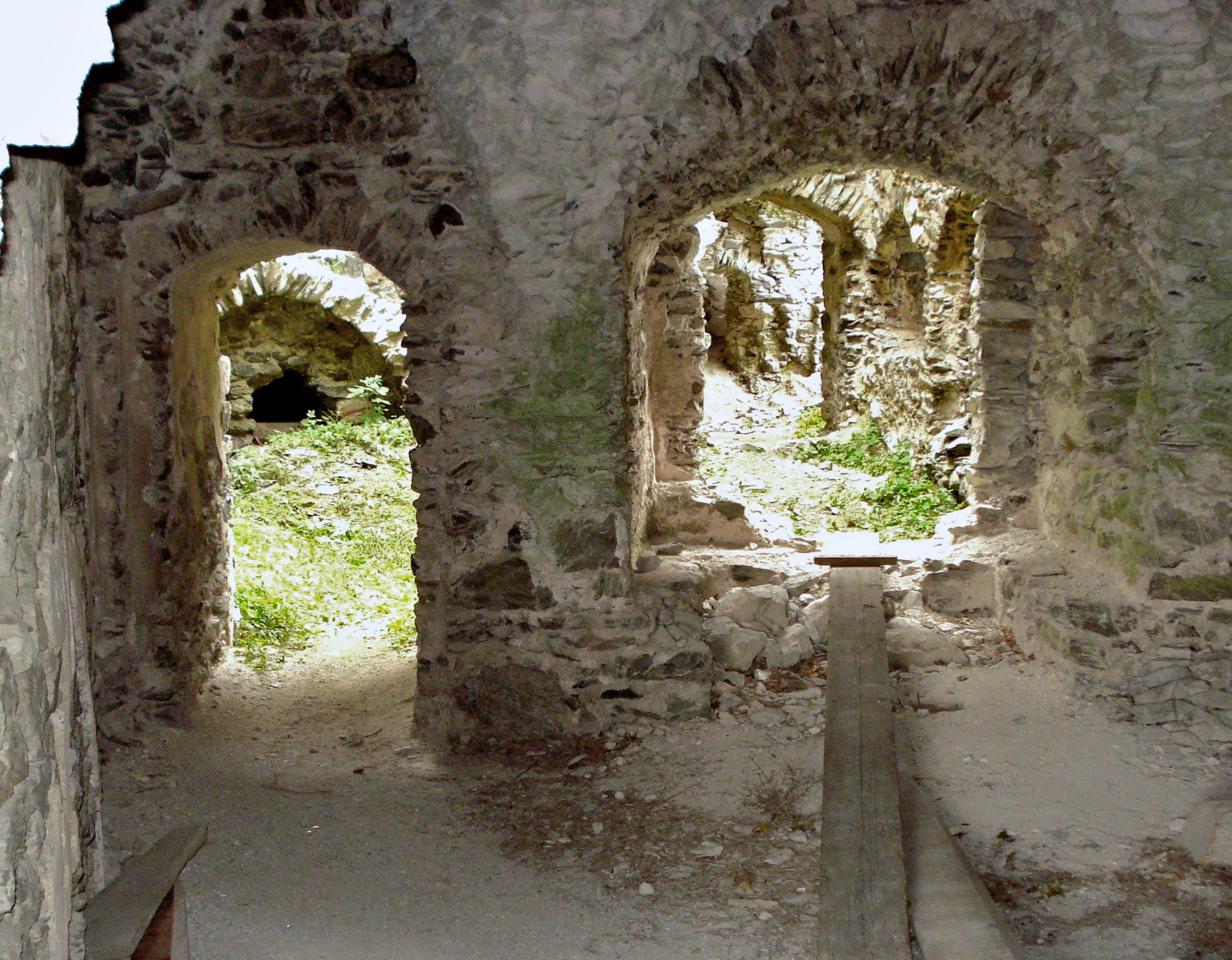
Burgruine Hardegg. The interior shows round Romanesque and pointed Gothic arches.

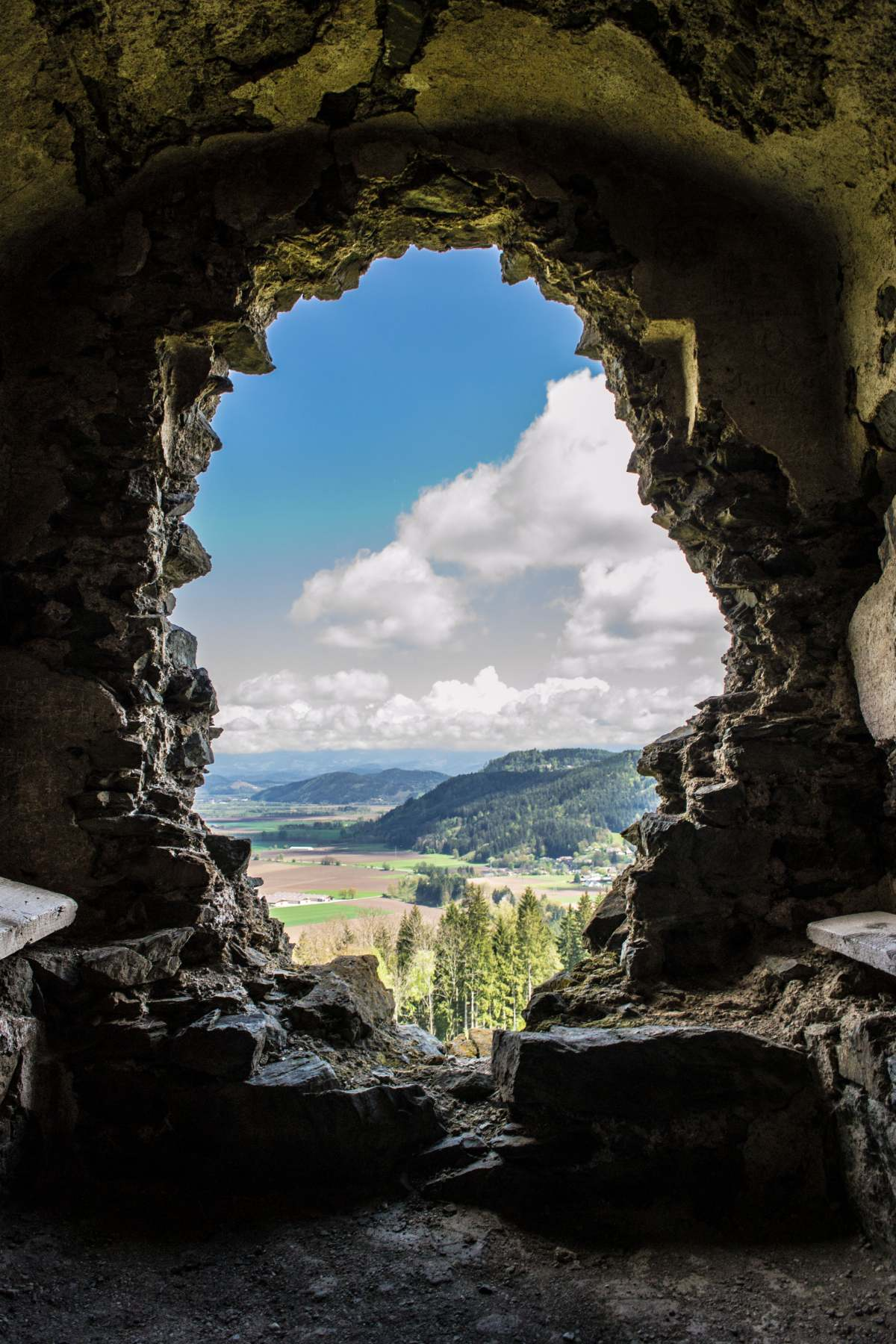
Burgruine Hardegg, a wall breakthrough provides a view of St. Veit

=== Watchtower and Chapel ===
On a hilltop with a rampart almost 200 meters south of the main castle there is a Romanesque round watchtower (drop tower) with a high entrance and the remains of a round chapel with a semicircular apse above a moat. During a restoration beginning 1978, late Gothic, ornamental mural fragments were uncovered here.

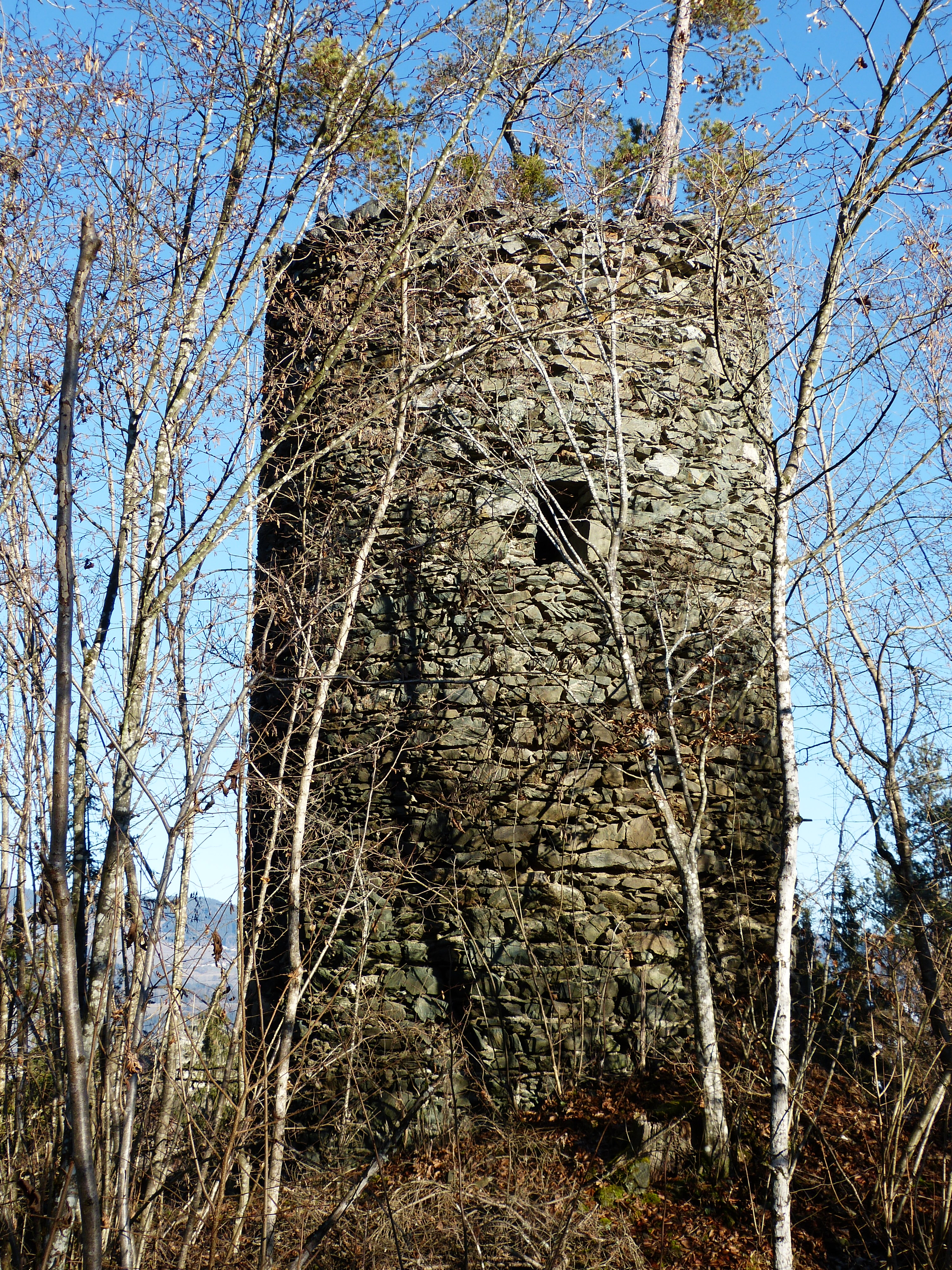
Romanesque watchtower

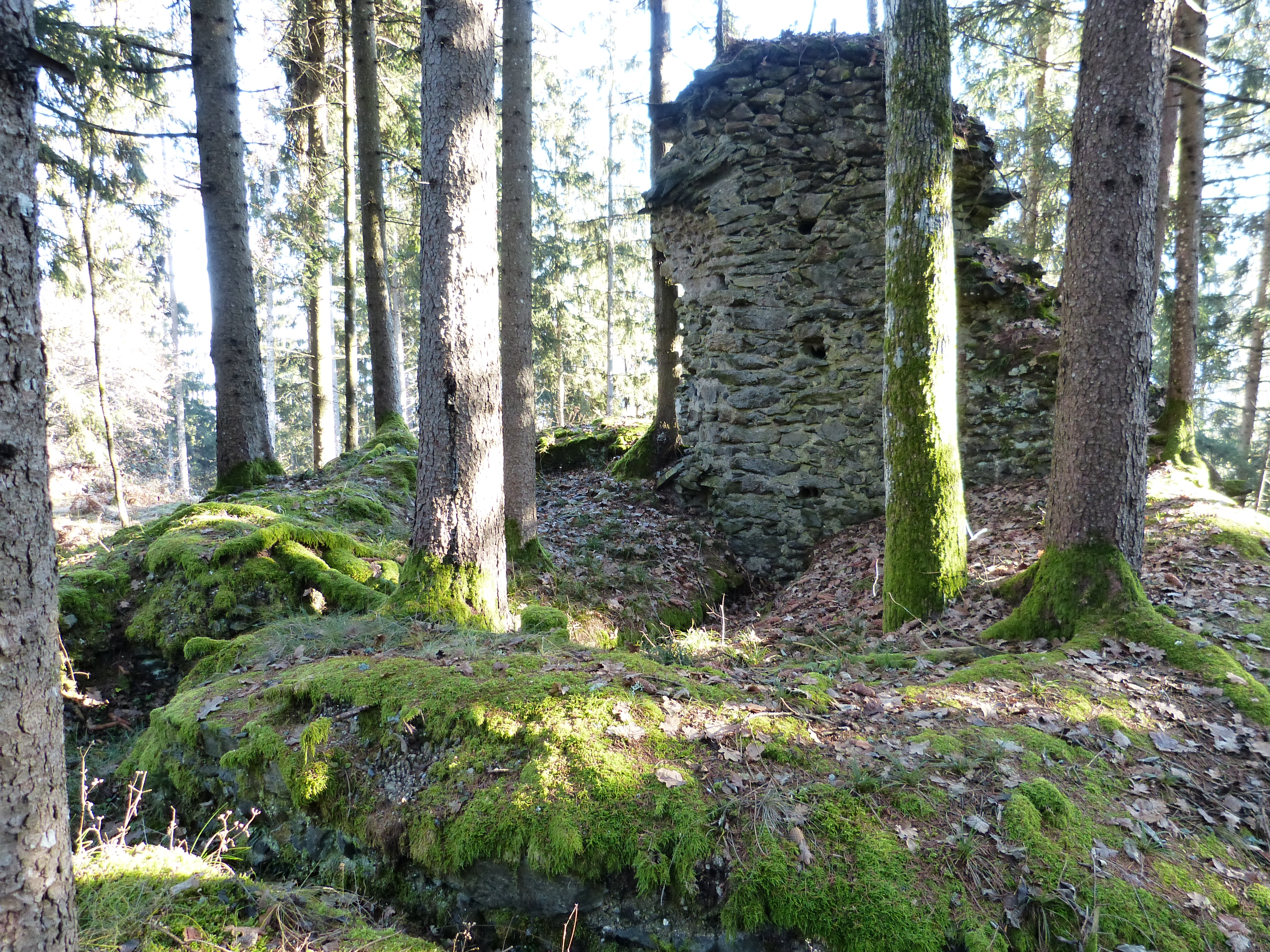
Ruins of a romanesque chapel

== See also ==
- List of castles in Austria
