= Burgruine Gradenegg =

Ruined medieval castle in Austria

Coordinates: 46°45′48″N 14°14′36″E

- Carinthia, Austria
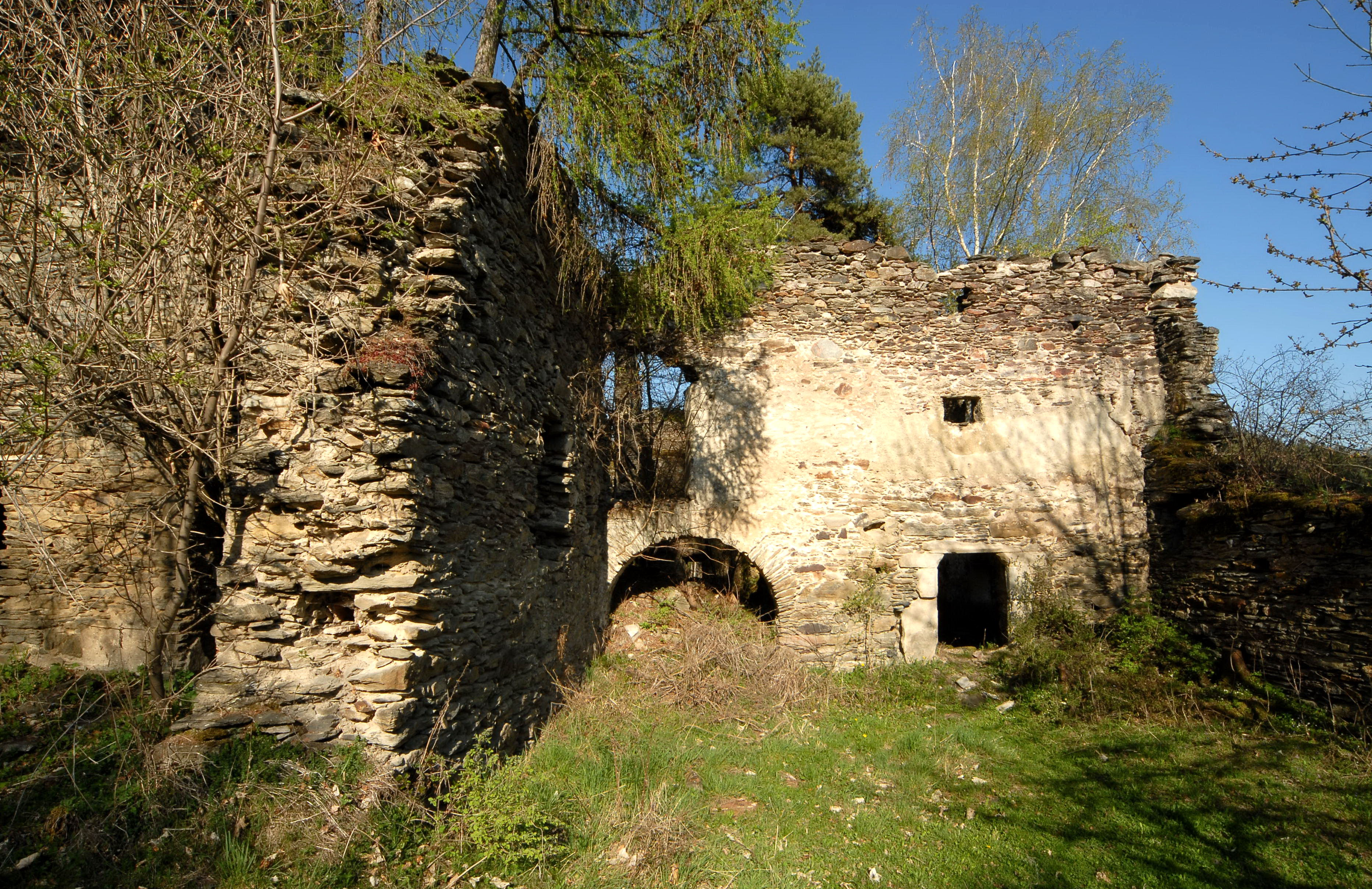

Site information
- Type: Castle
- Condition: Ruin

Site history
- Built: 1192

Burgruine Gradenegg is a ruined castle in the municipality of Liebenfels in Carinthia, Austria.

The small castle complex, which is in a state of decay, lies around 300 meters above Glantalboden on a low, rocky hilltop. .

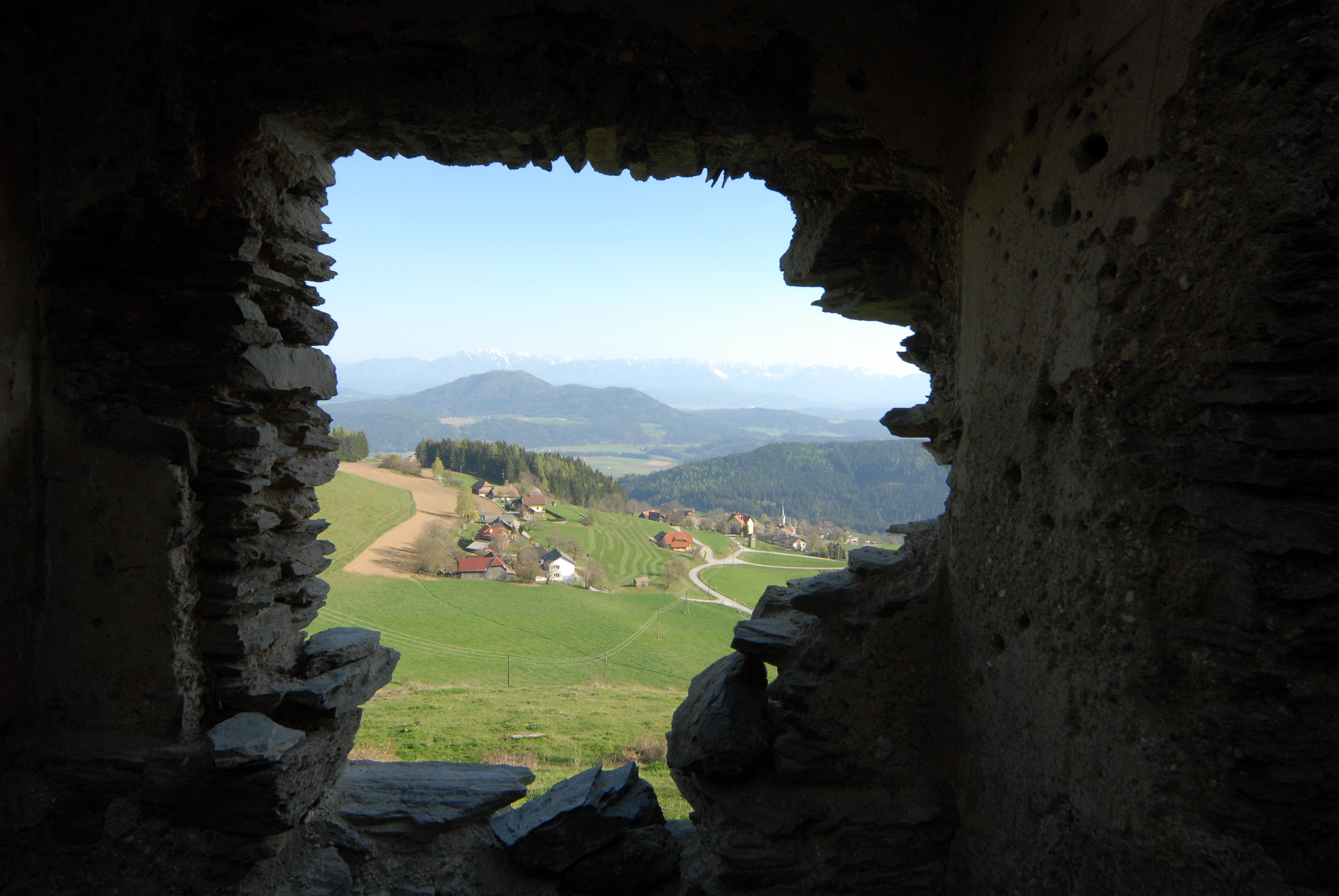
View of the market town Liebenfels from the keep of the castle ruin

== Details ==
The core of the complex is a massive Romanesque keep, around which some farm buildings from the 14th/15th century are grouped. To the west, separated from the economic complex, is the three-storey great hall. This building, which was part of the original construction, was extensively remodeled and extended in the 16th century and fitted with marble windows and door walls. The castle is surrounded by a ring wall from the 15th century, and in the northeast corner of this enclosure is a small corner tower. The castle was also accessed from the north side, where it is protected by a substantial moat.

== History ==
The first documented reference to the castle was on 27 May 1192, attested by Rudlandus de Gradnich as Ministeriale of the Carinthian Duke. He belonged to the Lords of Gradenegg. Reinprecht von Gradenegg was the last representative of this family line to possess the estate in 1436.

The Carinthian historian Franz Xaver Kohla reports that in 1787 Roman copper and silver coins were found near or in the castle. Kohla also mentions old mines.

The castle was severely damaged by the severe earthquake in 1796 and soon afterwards was only used for stables and farm outbuildings. A drawing by the artist Markus Pernhart, which has since disappeared, shows that the castle still had all its roofs around 1870, but was already in a state of decay.

== See also ==
- List of castles in Austria
