= Burgruine Liemberg =

Castle ruin in Austria

Coordinates: 46°44′53″N 14°13′03″E

- Carinthia, Austria
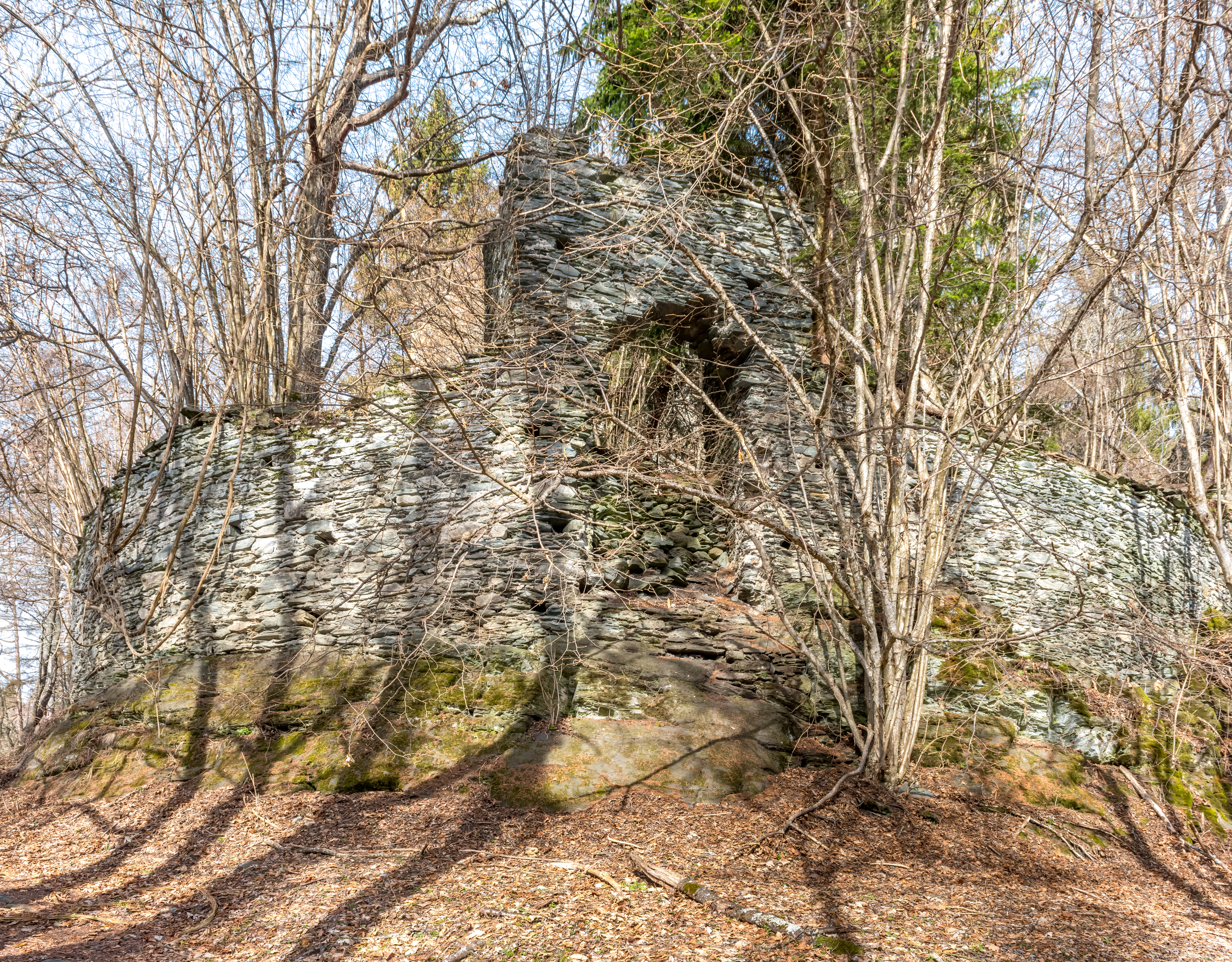

Site information
- Type: Hilltop castle

Site history
- Built: 1167

Burgruine Liemberg is a ruined castle in Carinthia, Austria, west of the town of the same name in the municipality of Liebenfels on the steep slope of the Göseberg.

The complex, built in the 12th century, consists of a Romanesque Round tower of about nine meters in diameter, a well preserved Gothic keep and the great hall, which has been remodeled. Due to its small size, this rather unusual castle complex has been largely overlooked.

The outwork built in rocky steps below the castle was adapted as a farm residence and was inhabited until the 20th century.

== History ==
The area around the castle was already used in prehistoric and Roman times. The oldest documented reference to Liemberg dates back to Wolfpertus de Liebenberch in 1167.

There are reports of damage from the Friuli earthquake of 1348. In the 16th century, the castle was given up as a residence after its then owners had Castle Liemberg built at the foot of the slope. Around 1688 Liemberg was described by Valvasor as the "old desolate and deserted castle".

== See also ==
- List of castles in Austria
