= Burgruine Liebenfels =

Castle ruins in Carinthia, Austria

Coordinates: 46°45′16″N 14°16′54″E

- Carinthia, Austria
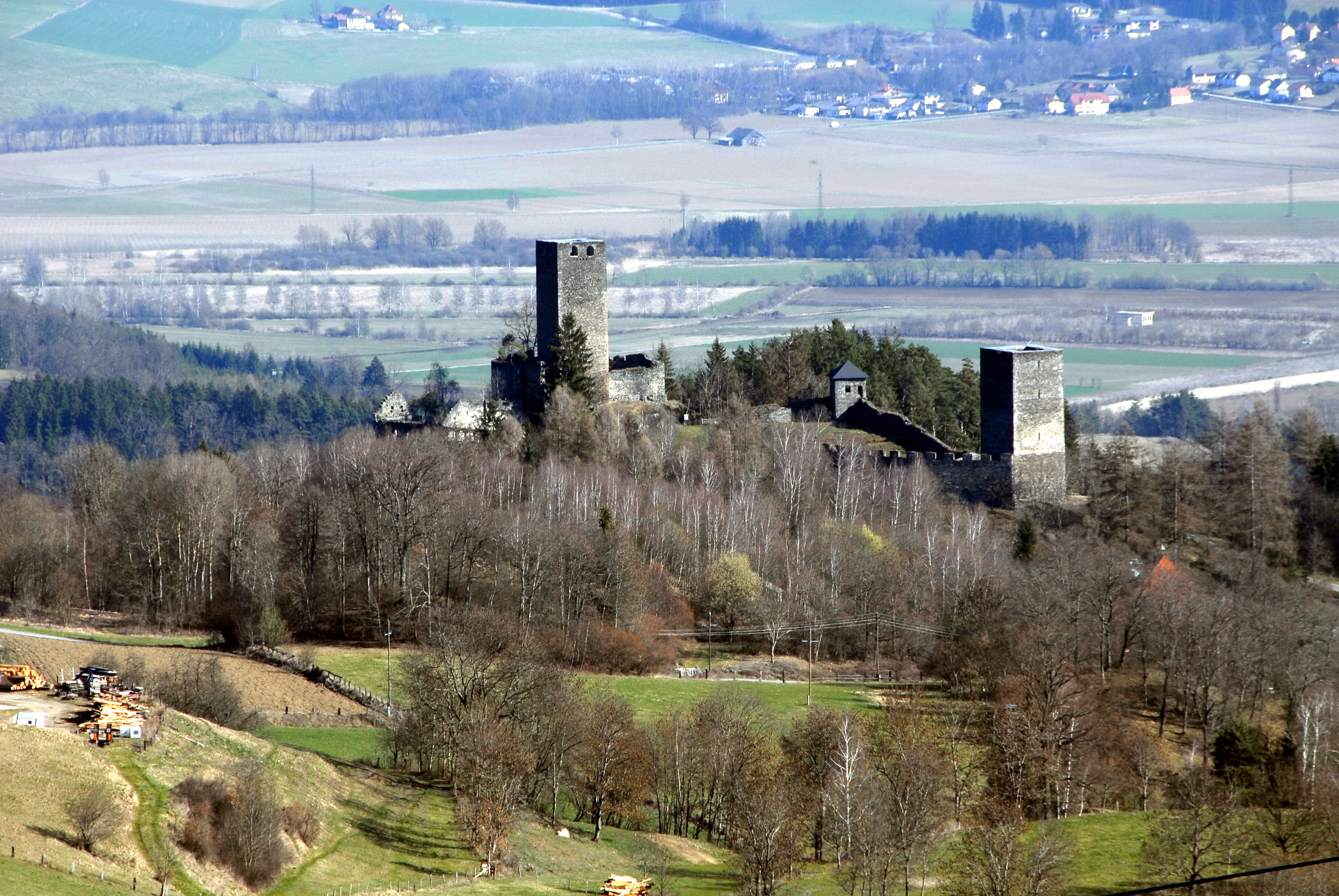
- Liebenfels Castle ruin

Site information
- Type: Castle

Burgruine Liebenfels is a pair of castle ruins on a rocky hilltop northeast of the municipality of Liebenfels in the district of Sankt Veit an der Glan, the historical central area of Carinthia, Austria. The surviving structures include examples of Romanesque, Gothic and Renaissance architecture.

== The structures and grounds ==
There are two massive keeps, from around 1300 and the early 14th century respectively, one in the stronghold and one in the extensive outer Bailey. The keep of the stronghold has six floors and is located in the middle of the small-scale stronghold. This keep has a conspicuous group of windows on the penultimate floor, which F. X. Kohla interpreted as a signal window. These windows are also characteristic of a heated room.

The stronghold, which is grouped around the larger keep, also includes the former great hall, which had a hall on the upper floor with three bifora windows and an adjoining, heated room. The conspicuous five-part window group facing north, which indicates a log workshop or plank room, still bears witness to this living room.

The complex is surrounded by an early Gothic ring wall with battlements that have been preserved. The castle chapel, also early Gothic, has two floors. To the north of the chapel is another Gothic residential building with stepped gables and evidence of a heated room and the characteristic room windows that can already be observed in the keep and the great hall structure.

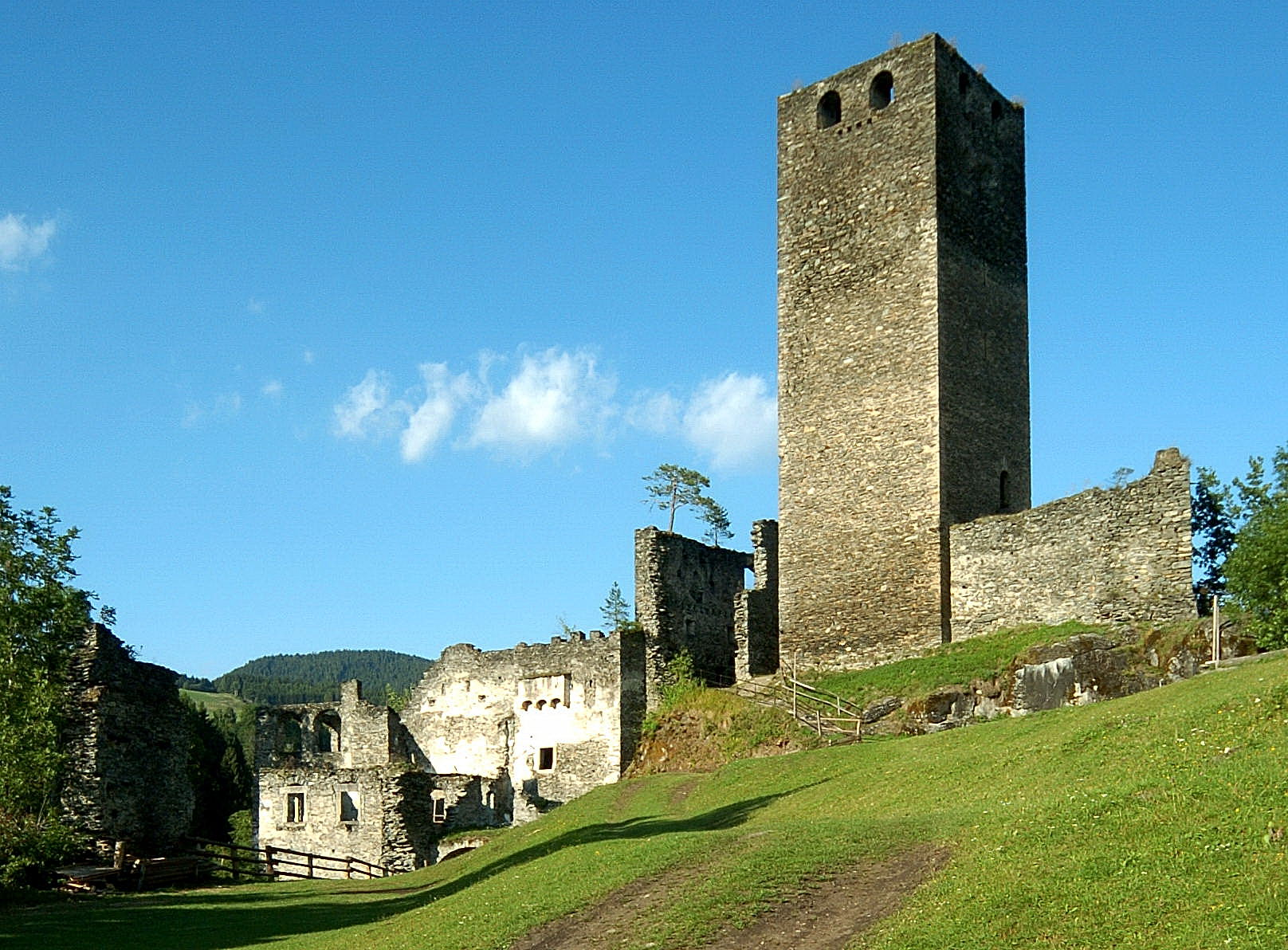
Eastern part of the castle, with keep

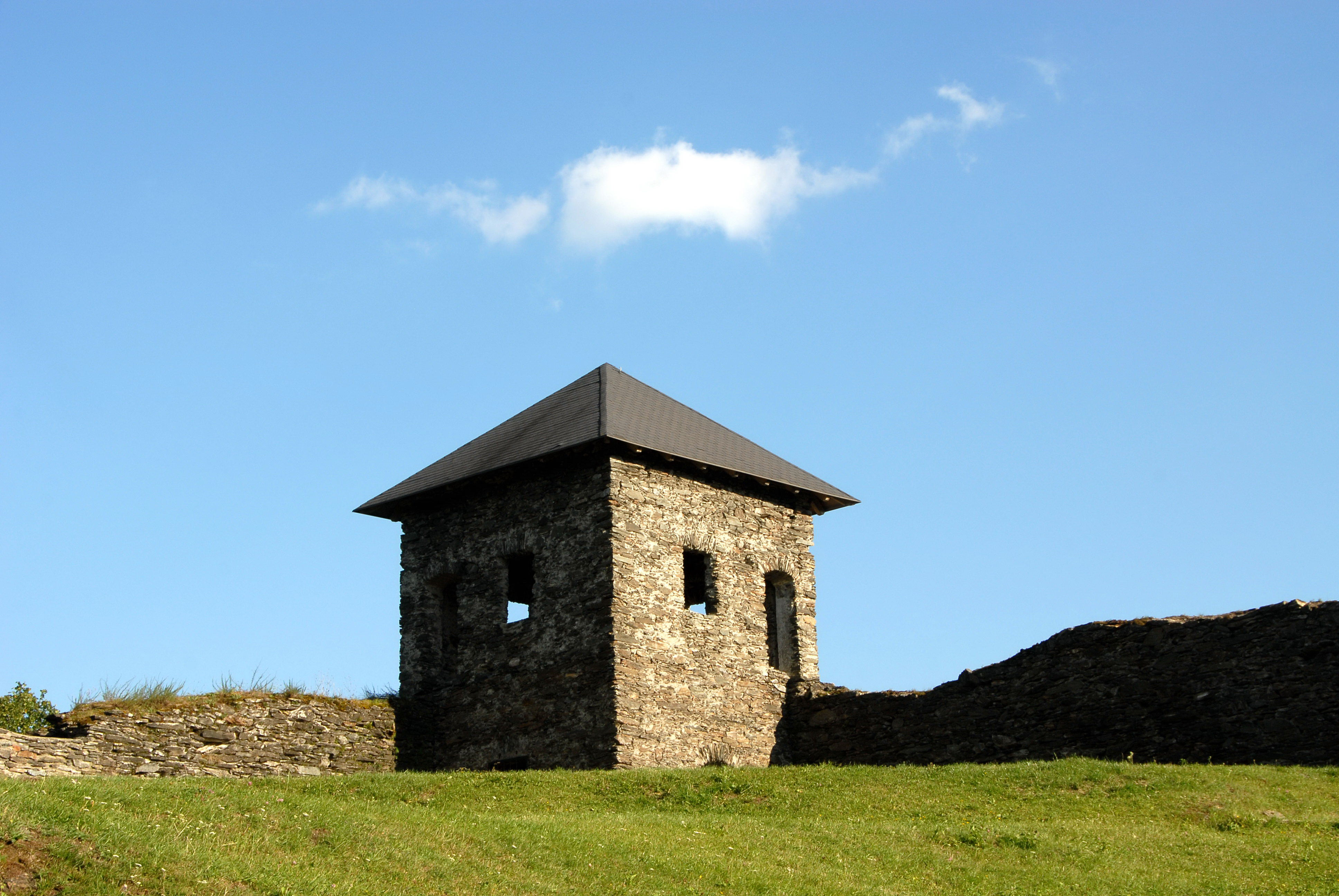
small tower

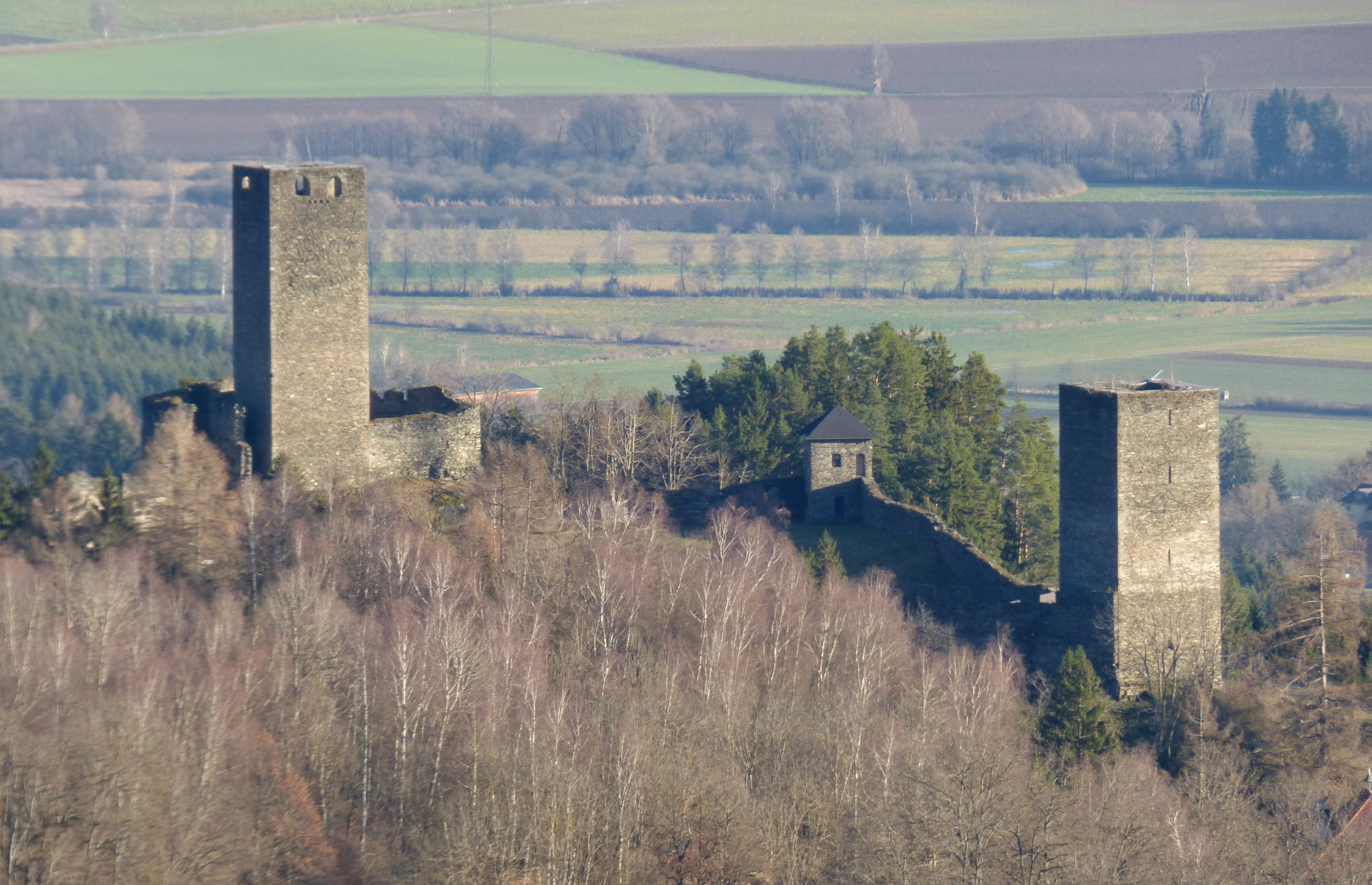
on the left, the main castle with keep; on the right, a second keep

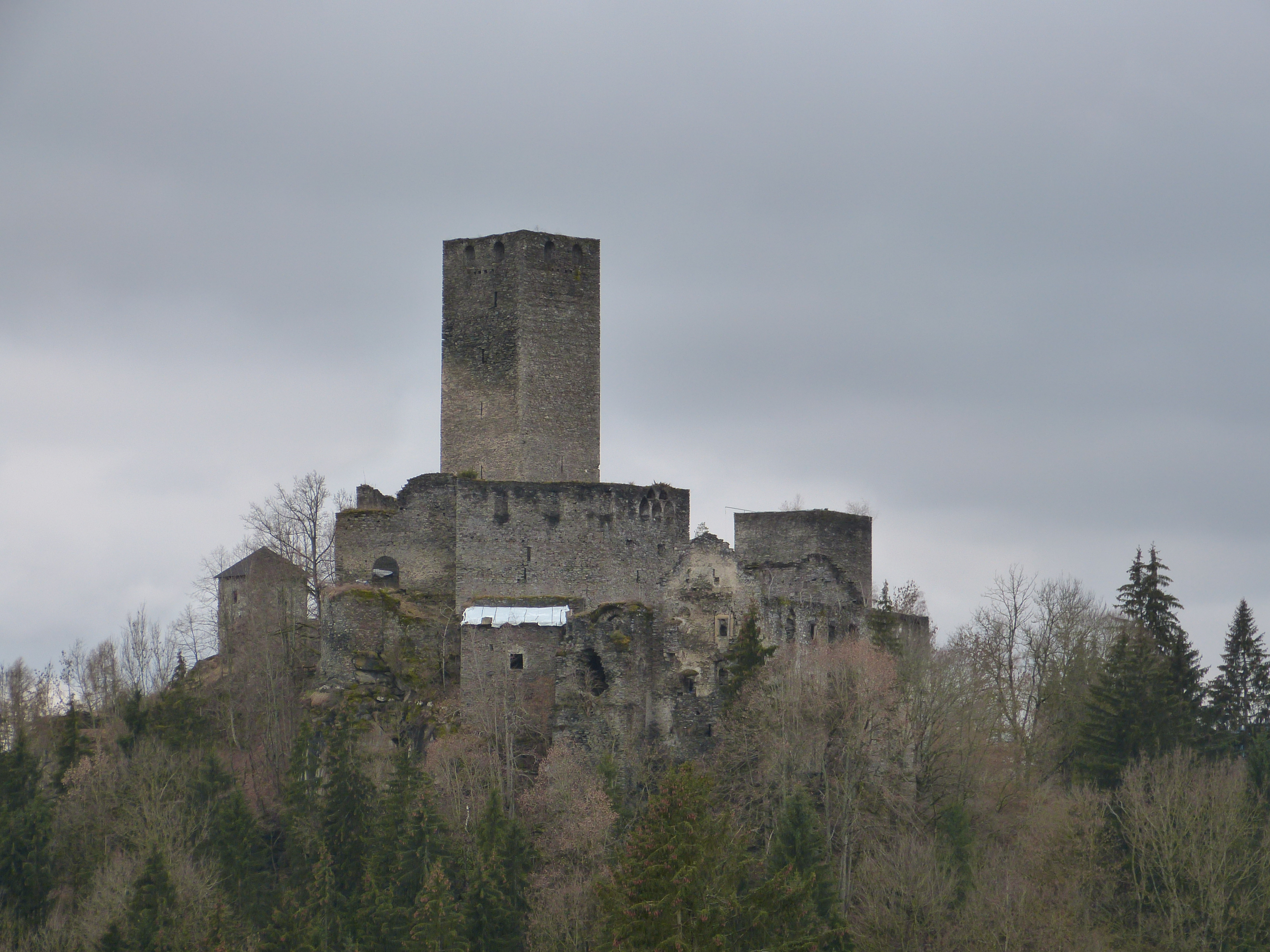
great hall, residential buildings and outbuildings to the east below the keep

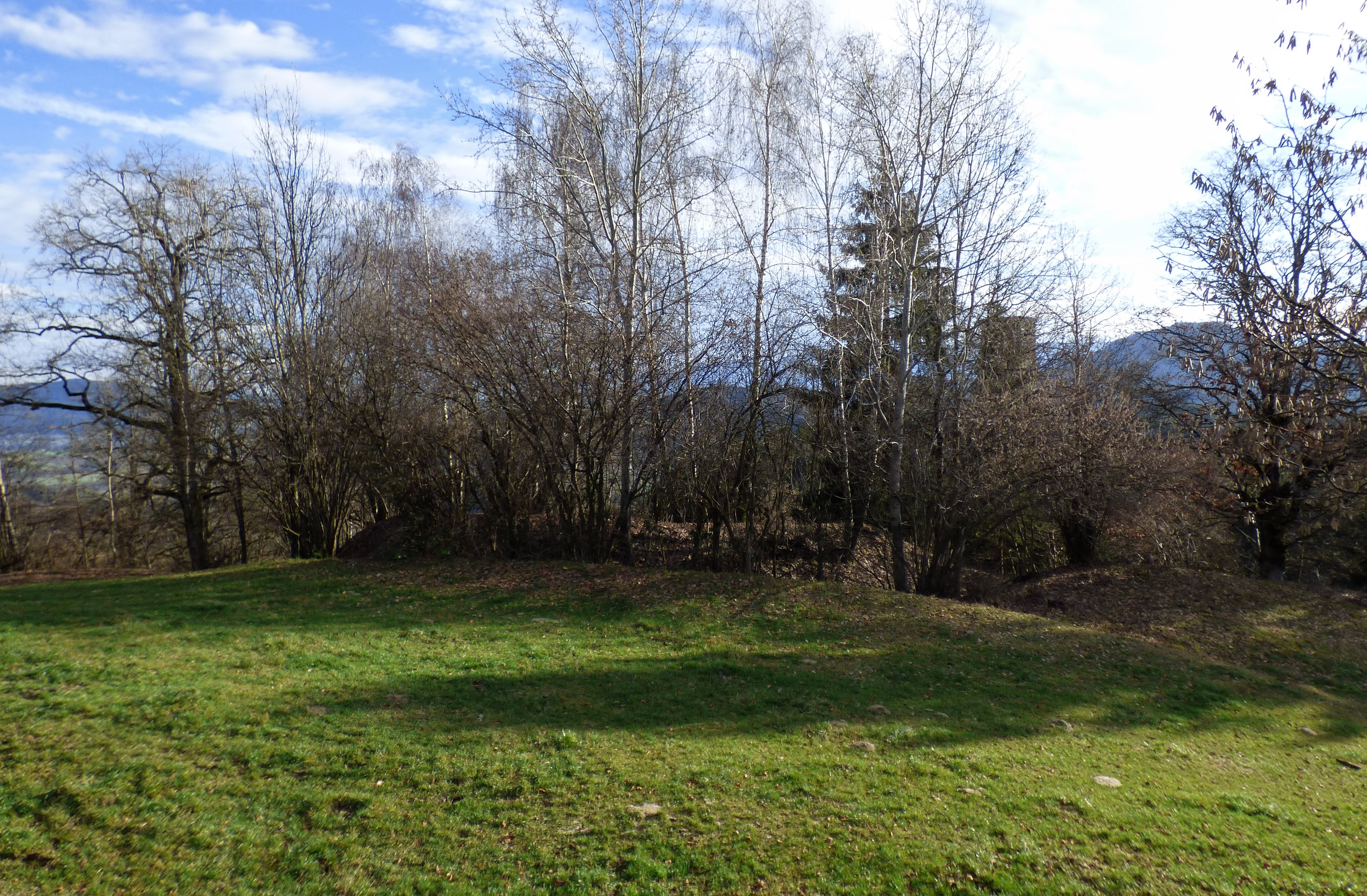
200 m north of the castle: remains of a bastion from the Hungarian siege, 15th century

== See also ==
- List of castles in Austria
