= Burgruine Taggenbrunn =

Castle ruin in Austria

Coordinates: 46°46′17″N 14°23′21″E

- Carinthia, Austria
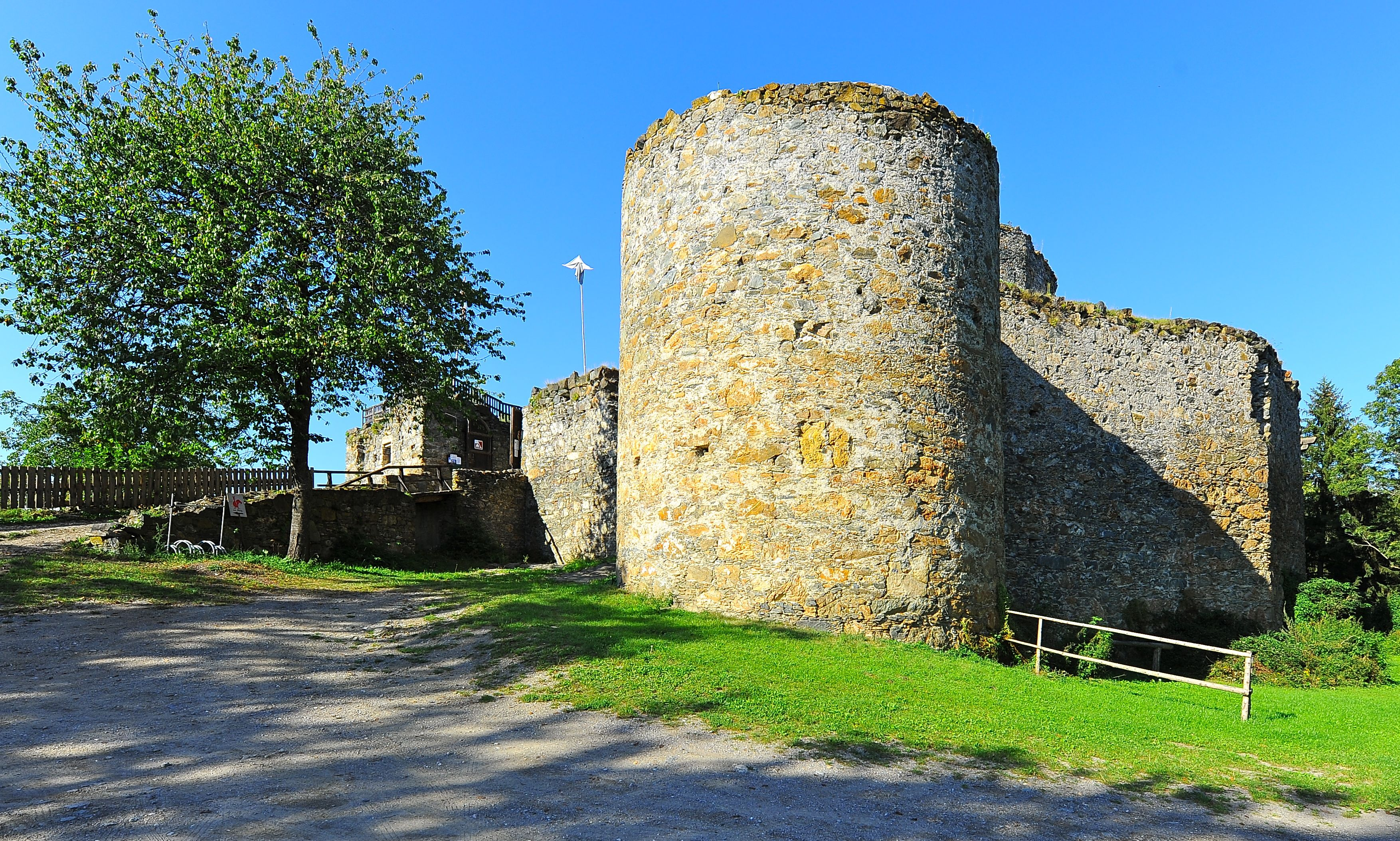
- Taggenbrunn castle ruins

Site information
- Type: Castle

Burgruine Taggenbrunn is a castle in Carinthia, Austria. Burgruine Taggenbrunn is 616 metres (2,021 ft) above sea level.

== See also ==
- List of castles in Austria
