= Markus Pernhart =

Austrian painter (1824–1871)

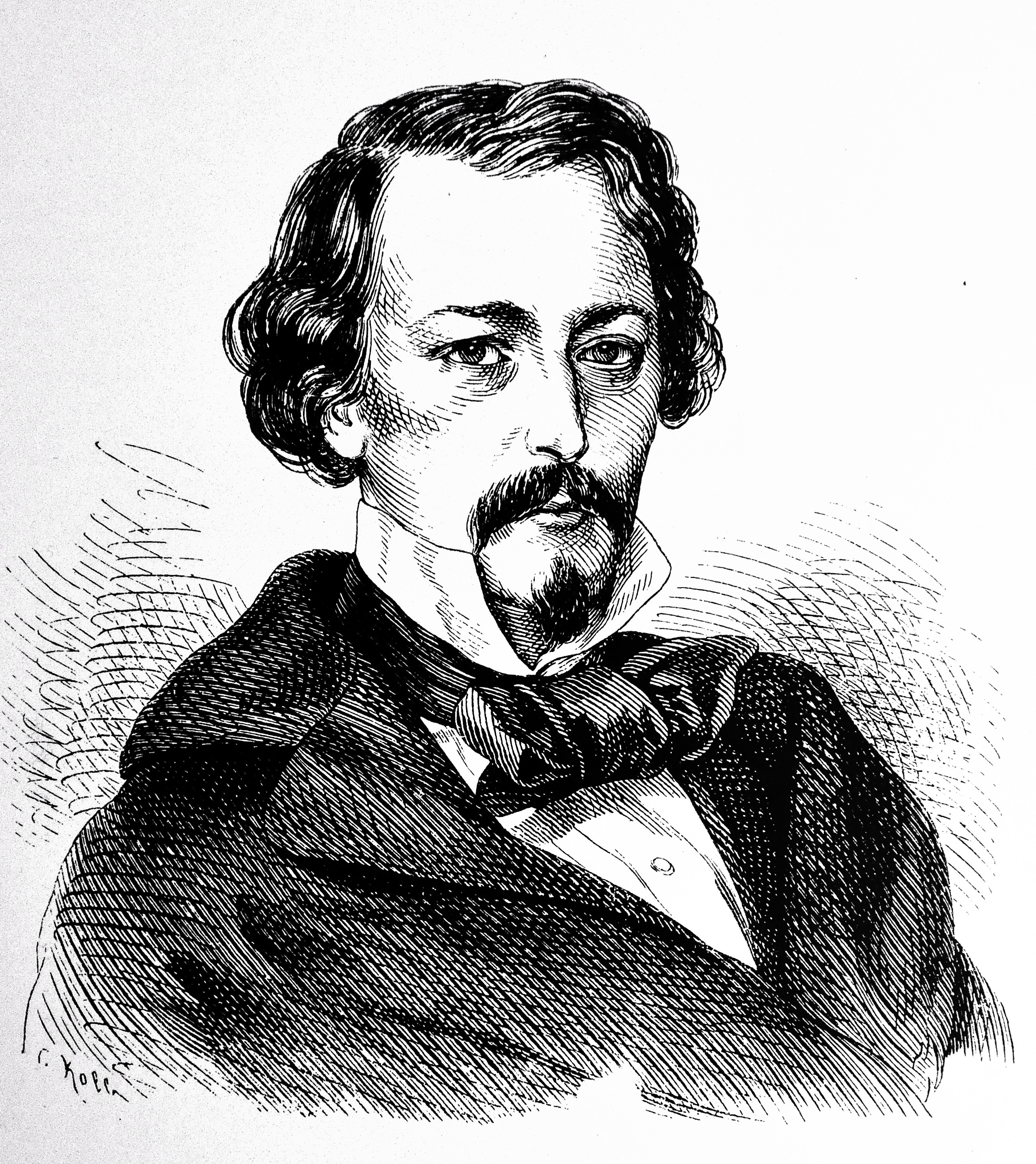
- Born: 6 July 1824; Untermieger, Austrian Empire
- Died: 30 March 1871 (aged 46); Klagenfurt, Austria-Hungary
- Known for: first Slovenian realistic landscape painter
- Notable work: Pictures from Carinthia
- Style: landscape painting

Markus Pernhart (also written as Marko Pernath; 6 July 1824 – 30 March 1871) was a Carinthian Slovenian / Austrian painter of romantic landscape impressions, considered to have been a pioneer in this style in Austria. According to the Encyclopedia of Slovenian Biography, he is considered the first Slovenian realistic landscape painter.

== Life ==
Markus Pernhart was born on 6 July 1824 in Untermieger as the eldest child of a carpenter from St Veit im Jauntal. He probably attended elementary school in Tainach. He began painting at an early age, painting beehive front boards and he offered his early works at the Klagenfurt weekly market. When he was barely 12, he painted the dining rooms of the Krajcar restaurant between Klagenfurt and Völkermarkt. The innkeeper made the episcopal chaplain Henr. Hermann aware of the talented boy. At the age of 15 he first learned to paint from Andreas Hauser in Klagenfurt. Hermann continued to support him and brought him to meet with his patron, the Archbishop of Gorizia Franz Xaver Luschin (Franc Lušin), who was also a native of Tainach. It is possible Hermann also introduced him to Eduard von Moro. Through this he came into contact with the Viennese art scene, in particular with Franz Steinfeld, who taught at the Academy of Fine Arts located there. He was referred to the Munich Academy, but soon returned to Carinthia. There his prestige rose and he became one of the most famous landscape painters of his day under his stage name Pernhart.

== Castles and palaces of Carinthia ==
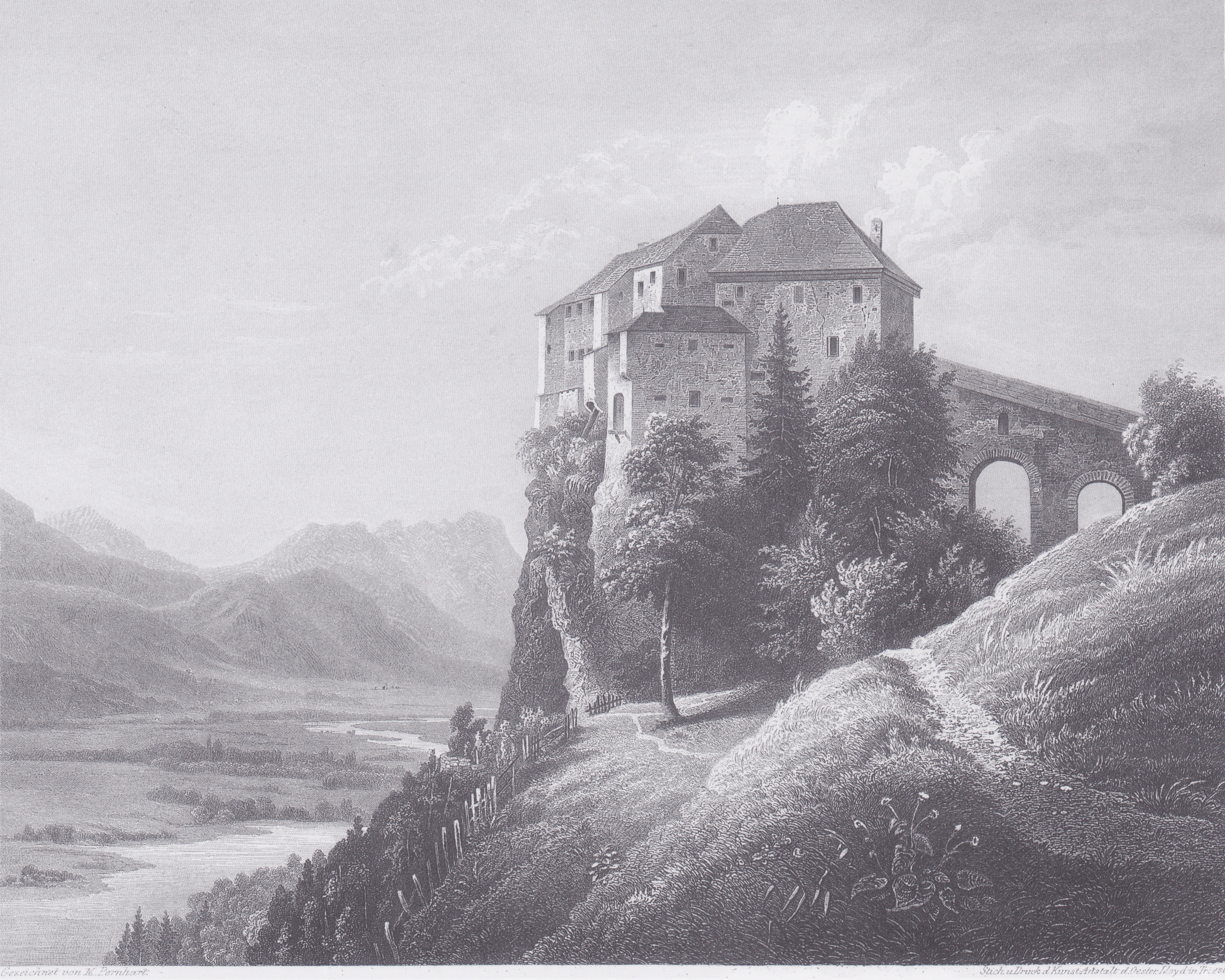
Engraving of Schloss Hollenburg by Pernhart

When Pernhart's drawing style had fully developed, he was asked by Max von Moro to draw all of the castles and palaces in Carinthia. The idea was to preserve these buildings, if not in physical form due to financial reasons, at least through pictures and so then keep them from decay. Markus Pernhart did not disappoint his client and recorded the smallest details in pencil drawings of the well-preserved facilities, but also of the partly dilapidated ones as well. As early as 1853, he made up to 40 drawings, later on reaching 198, which are now in the property of the History Association for Carinthia. In 1855 the Carinthian estates gave Empress Elisabeth of Austria-Hungary an album with 21 drawings, to which Max Moro contributed the explanations. Under the title Pictures from Carinthia they appeared in deliveries between 1863 and 1868 as steel engravings with accompanying texts. After his death, five lithographic panorama pictures were published (Klagenfurt, 1875 and 1889).

In Carinthian and Slovenian cultural history, his drawing of the Fürstenstein in situ in Karnburg is an important one, as it is the only remaining evidence of its original location.

== Landscape styles ==
Pernhart depicted landscapes, preferably lake and high mountain motifs or castles, but also animal and still lifes as well, in an idyllic and emotive style. His works are to be seen against the background of a burgeoning leisure society, and they show the regional objects of status of his homeland.

== Estate ==
Markus Pernhart died on 30 March 1871, in Klagenfurt's Sankt Veiter Ring in the house number 28, likely due to abdominal ailments, and was buried at the St. Ruprecht cemetery in Klagenfurt. His entire painted works consist of around 1,200 pictures, which continue to enjoy great esteem even after his death.

In Slovenia, 8 pictures are preserved in the Slovenian National Gallery in Ljubljana, 4 of which are from the Šmarna gora from the estate of Bishop Jernej Widmer, which were bought by the Kranjska hranilnica (Sparkasse), some are now in private ownership.

The house where he died was demolished in the second half of 2004 in order to be replaced with a shopping center.
