= Liebenfels =

- Municipality
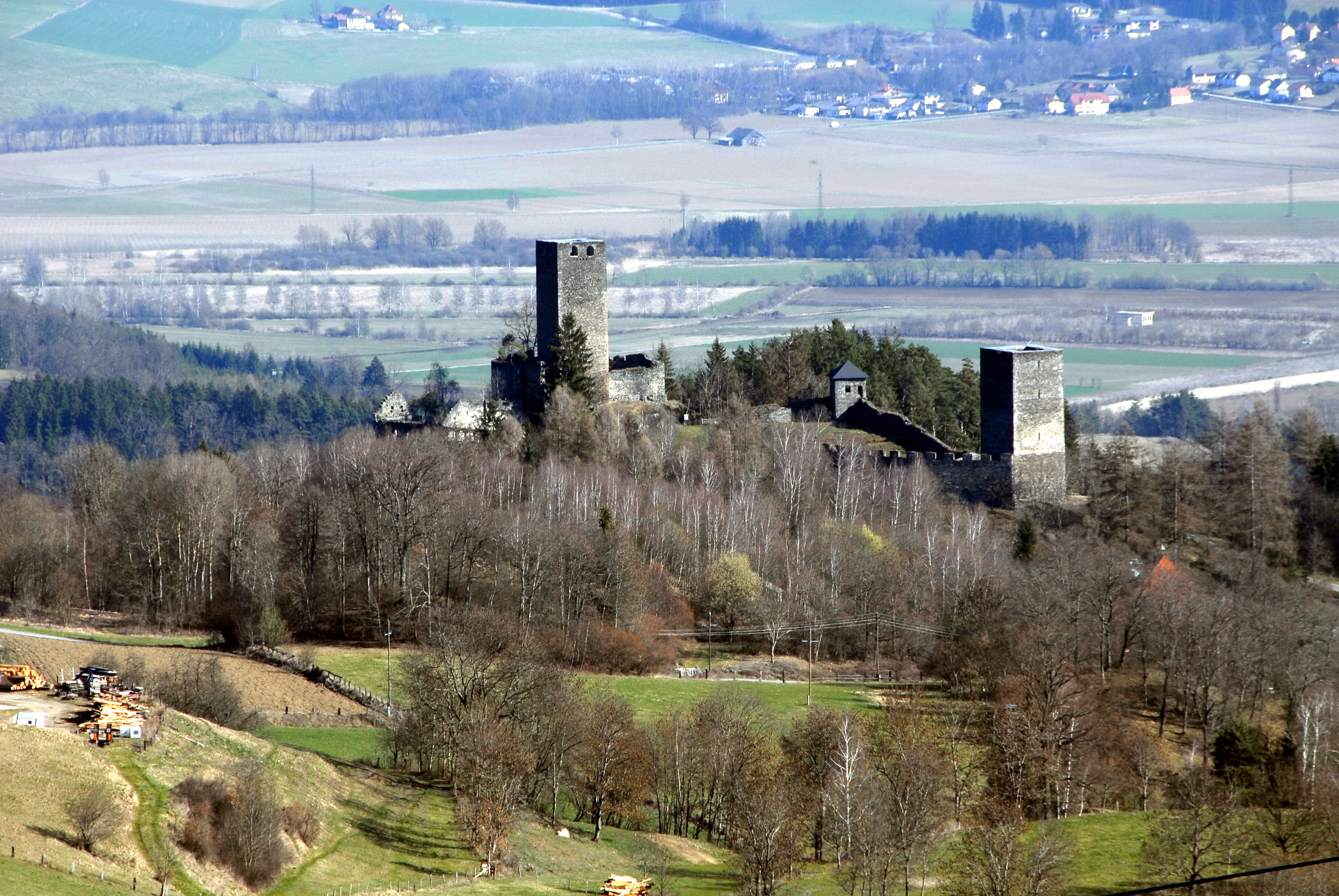
- Liebenfels Castle

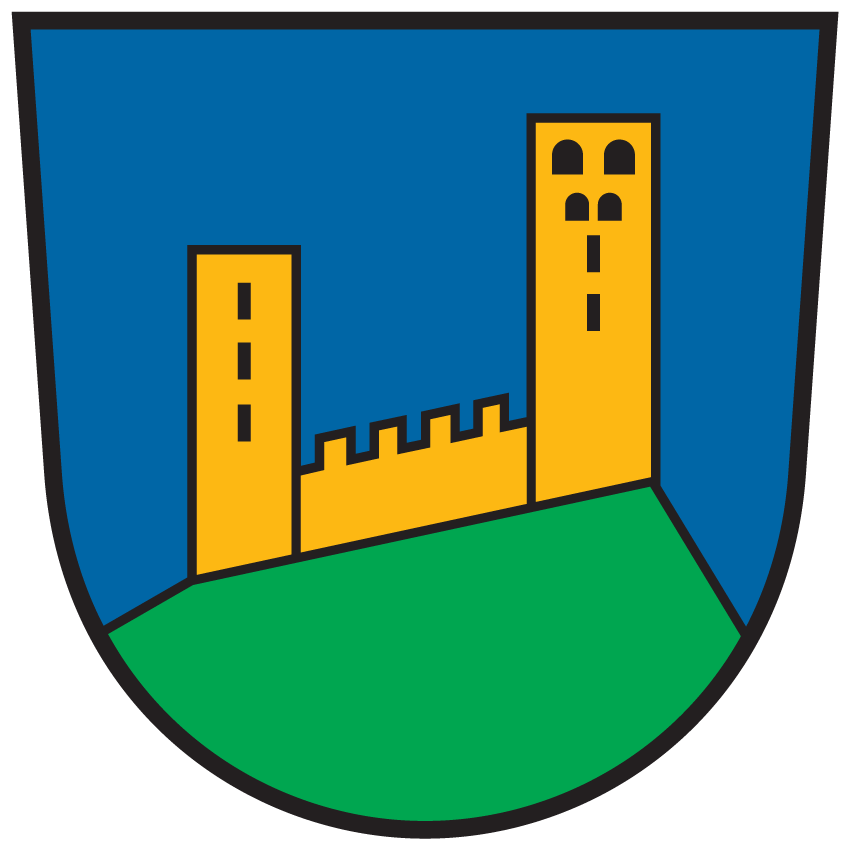
- Coat of arms

- Location within Austria
- Coordinates: 46°44′N 14°17′E
- Country: Austria
- State: Carinthia
- District: Sankt Veit an der Glan

Government
  - Mayor: Klaus Köchl (SPÖ)

Area
  - Total: 58.85 km^{2} (22.72 sq mi)
- Elevation: 491 m (1,611 ft)

Population (2018-01-01)
  - Total: 3,329
  - Density: 56.57/km^{2} (146.5/sq mi)
- Time zone: UTC+1 (CET)
  - Summer (DST): UTC+2 (CEST)
- Postal code: 9356
- Area code: 04215
- Website: liebenfels.at

Liebenfels (Slovene: Lepo Polje) is a market town in the district of Sankt Veit an der Glan in the Austrian state of Carinthia.

== Geography ==
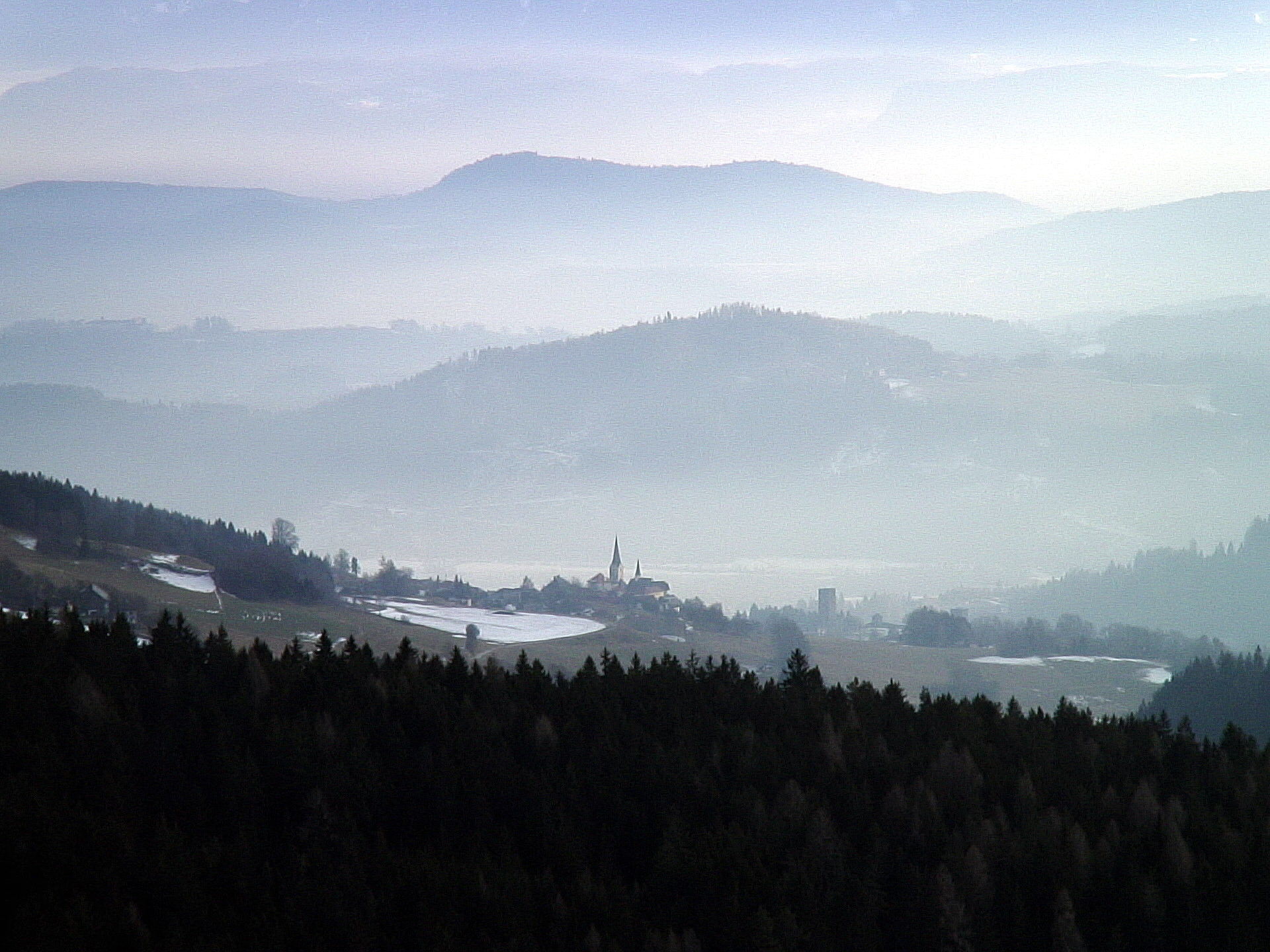
View from Schneebauerberg over Sörg and Liebenfels Castle

The municipal area is situated on the southern slopes of the Gurktal Alps. It lies about 6 km (3.7 mi) west of the district capital Sankt Veit an der Glan and directly north of the state capital Klagenfurt. The highest point in the municipality is the Schneebauerberg with an elevation of 1,338 m (4,390 ft), and the lowest is in the valley of the Glan river at 477 m (1,565 ft).

The municipality comprises the cadastral communities of Freundsam, Glantschach, Gradenegg, Hardegg, Liebenfels proper, Liemberg, Pflausach, Rosenbichl, Rottschaft Feistritz, Sörg, and Sörgerberg.

== History ==
While the oldest archaeological findings in the area date back to the Neolithic, the foundation of an ancient temple were discovered on a hill near the village of Hohenstein. The building was erected in the 2nd century AD, when the area was part of the Roman Noricum province, and dedicated to the local Celtic goddess Noreia.

The building of church in the village of Glantschach was documented between 958 and 991. Located near the central Zollfeld area in the Duchy of Carinthia, Liebenfels is the site of numerous medieval castles and residences, most notably Liebenfels Castle which was first mentioned as Liewenvelse in a 1312 deed.
