= Burgruine Steinschloß =

Castle in Styria, Austria

- Styria, Austria
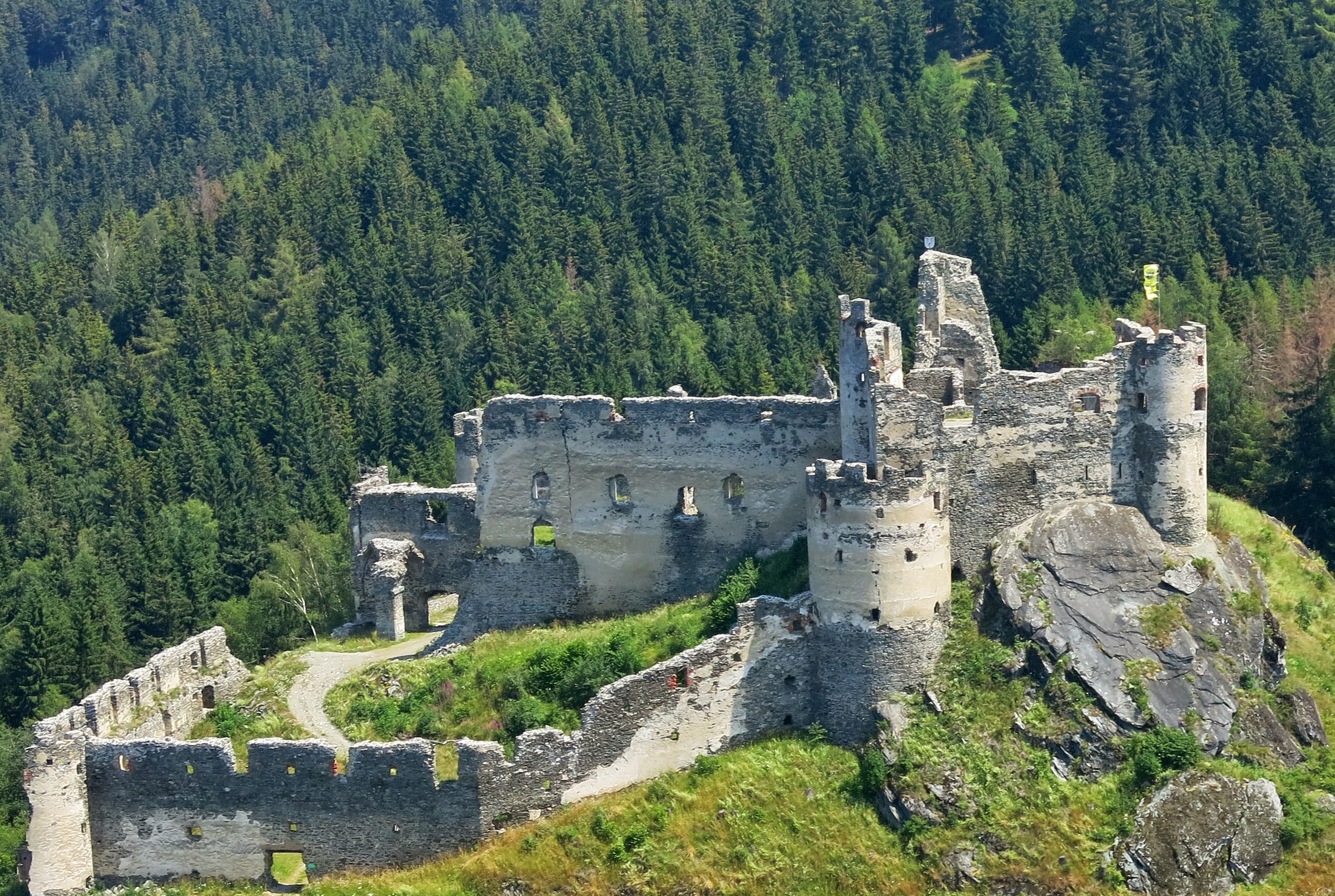

Site information
- Type: Hill castle
- Condition: Ruin
- Website: https://steinschloss.at/

Location
- Height: 1180 meters

Site history
- Built: 12th century

Burgruine Steinschloß is a castle in Styria, Austria.

== Geography ==
Burgruine Steinschloß is the highest castle ruin in Styria at 1180 meters above sea level. The castle ruins lie nestled in the Upper Murtal region within the municipality of Neumarkt in Styria, Austria.

== See also ==
- Commons: Ruine Steinschloss
- List of castles in Austria
