= Burg Dürnstein =

Castle ruin in Austria

- Styria, Austria
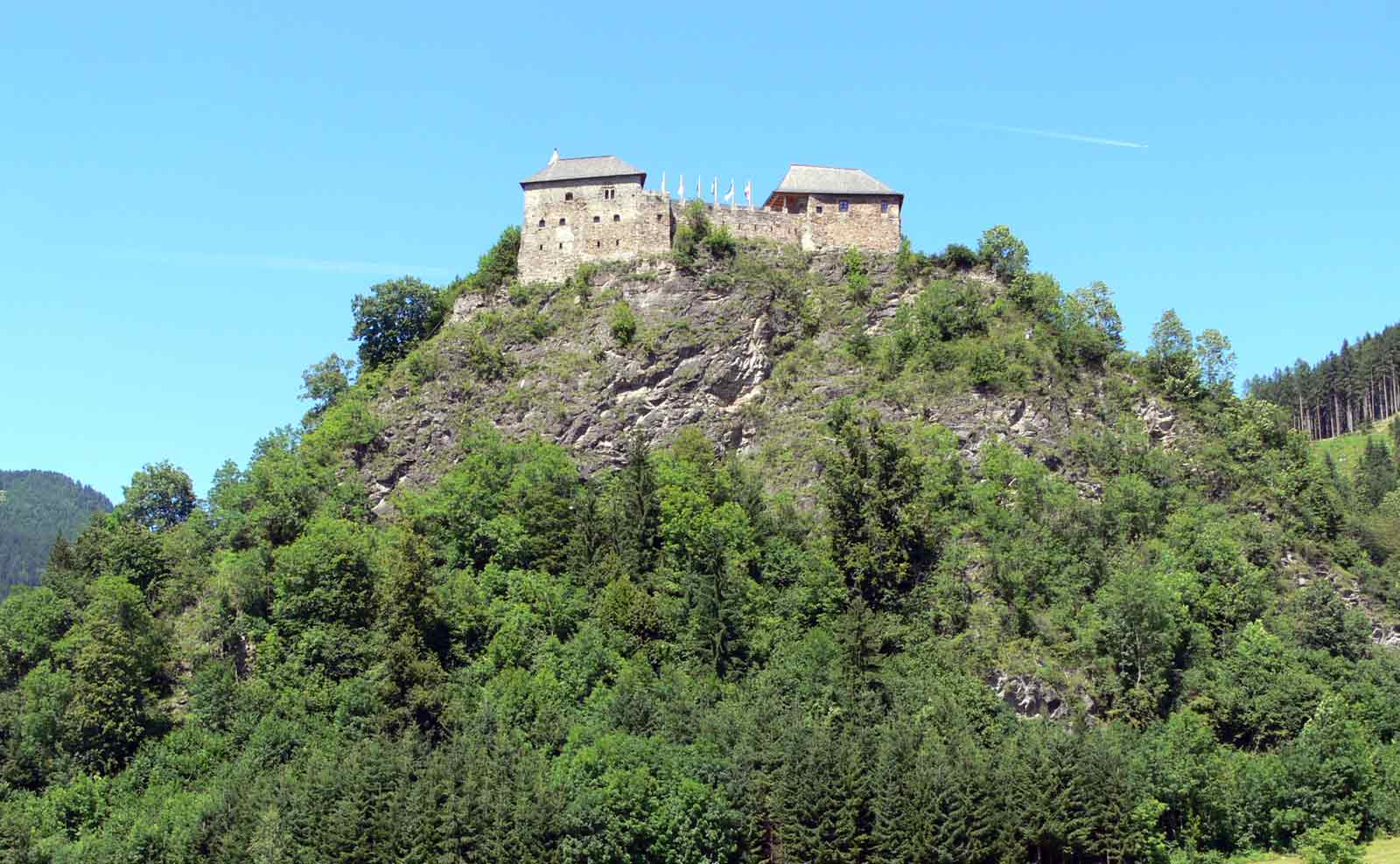
- The Burg Dürnstein in 2011

Site information
- Type: Hill Castle

Location
- Coordinates: 46°59′23.583″N 14°23′30.828″E

Site history
- Built: 1100 to 1200

Burg Dürnstein is a castle near the municipality Neumarkt in Steiermark in the district Murau of the state of Styria in Austria. Burg Dürnstein is 310 metres (1,020 ft) above sea level.

== See also ==
- List of castles in Austria
