= Burgruine Hieburg =

Castle ruin in Austria

Coordinates: 47°14′48″N 12°14′40″E

- Salzburg, Austria
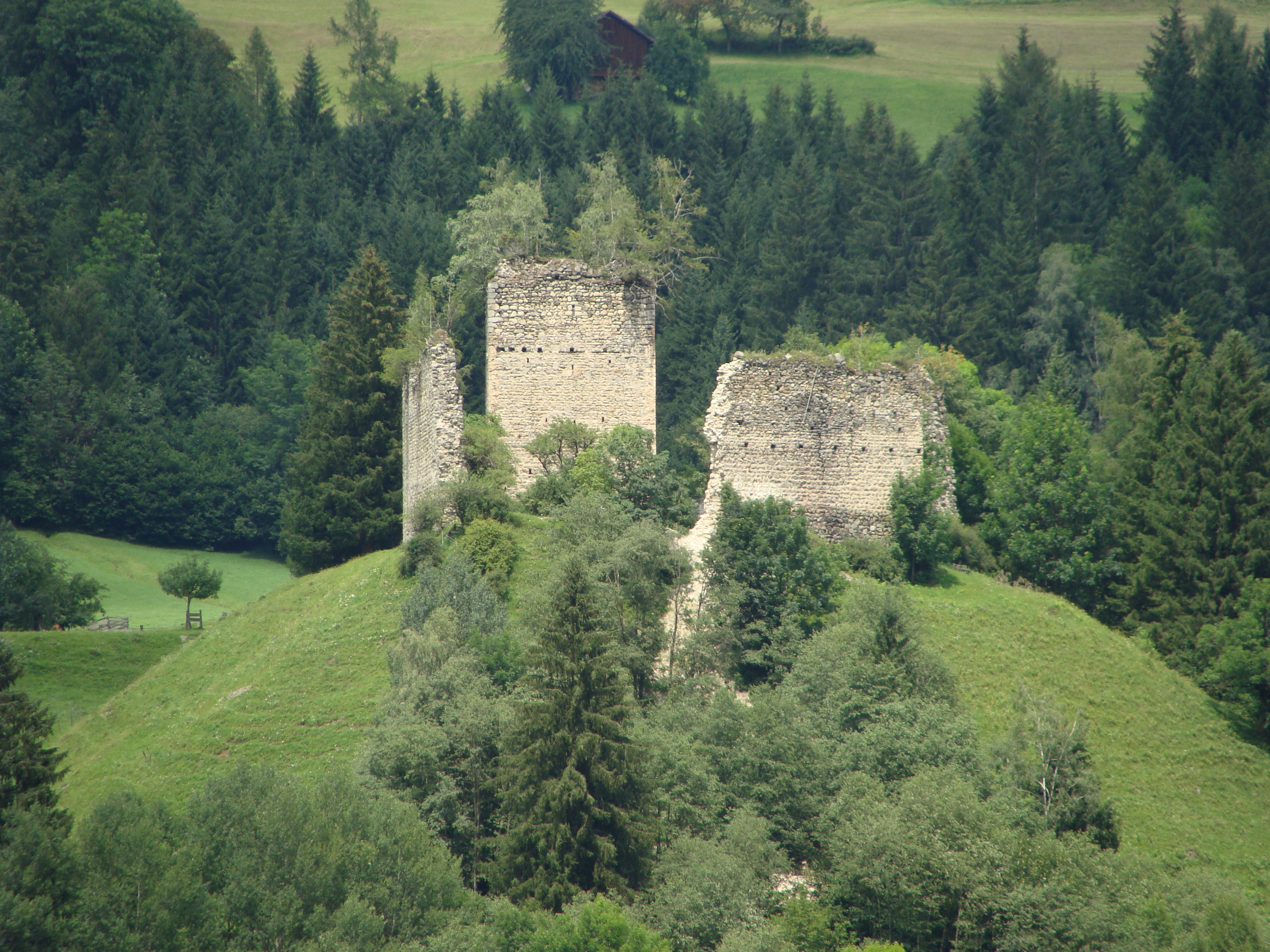

Site information
- Type: Hillside castle

Site history
- Built: before 1290

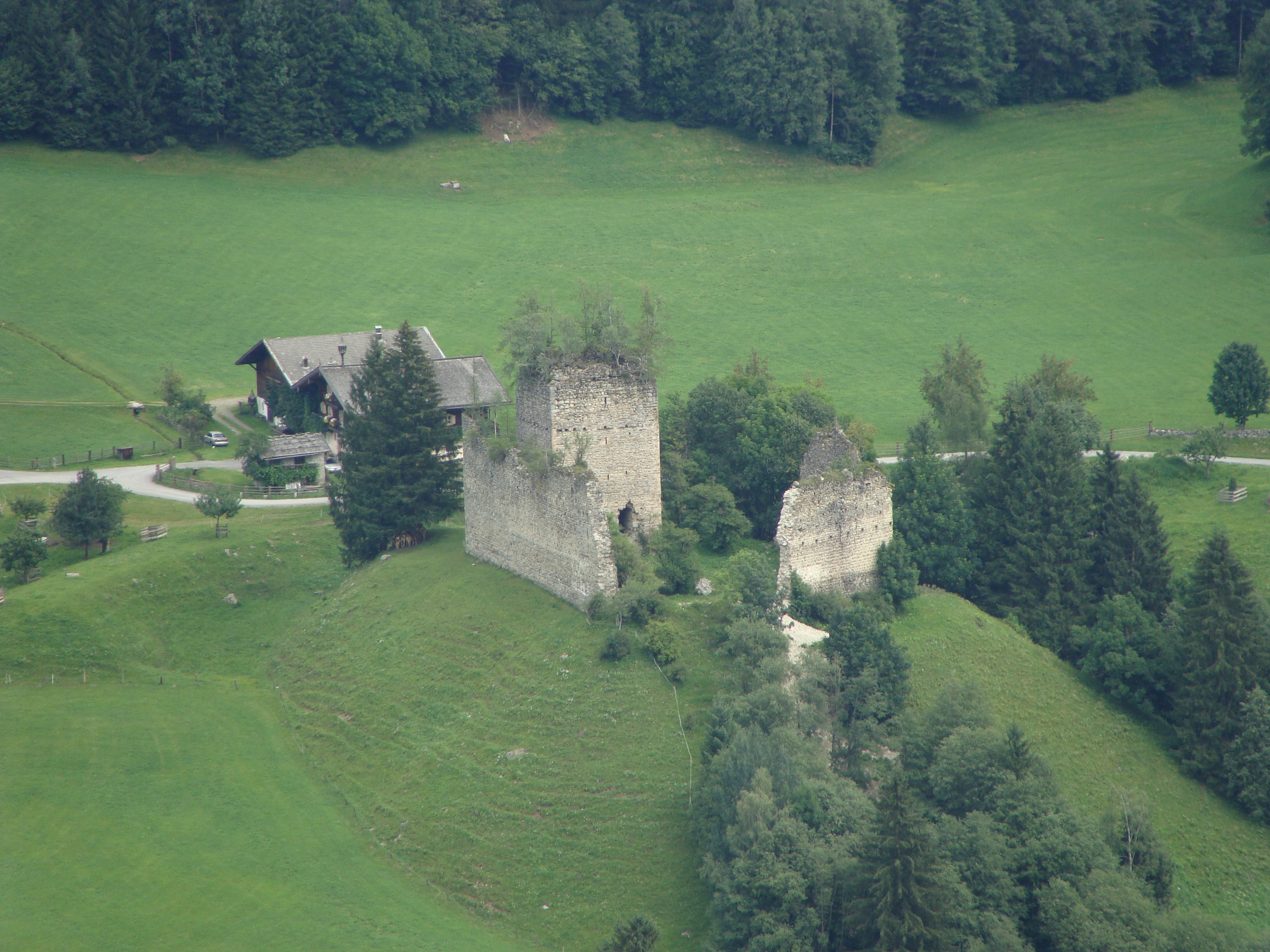
Hieburg castle ruins near Neukirchen am Großvenediger

Burgruine Hieburg is a castle in the state of Salzburg, Austria.

== See also ==
- List of castles in Austria
