= Burgruine Rauterburg =

Castle ruin in Austria

- Carinthia, Austria
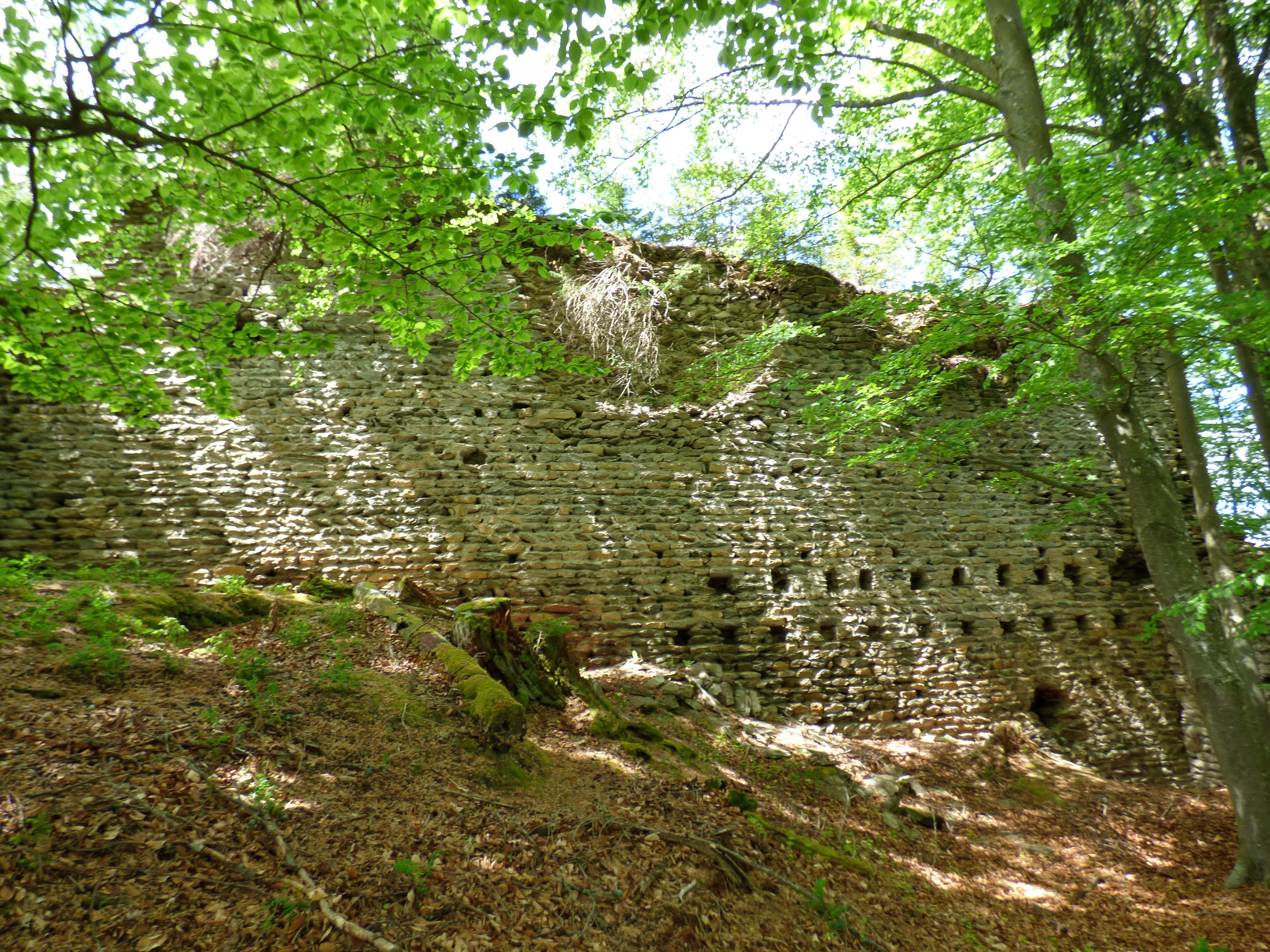

Site information
- Type: Castle

Location
- Coordinates: 46°42.070′N 14°39.585′E

Burgruine Rauterburg is a castle in Carinthia, Austria.

Home to the counts of Heunburg, it was eventually replaced by the Haimburg. The Castle is most likely from the Carolingian period in the 9th-10th centuries.

The oldest member of the family within historical texts is Gero I, who appears in 1070 and is considered the builder of Haimburg. In 1228, the Counts of Heunburg moved their place of residence to Bleiberg.

Since 1886 the ruin has been owned by the Helldorff family. In 1920 a large part of the ruin was removed and the material used for road construction. Today, only a few remains of one building, which is divided into four unequal rooms. No architectural details are preserved.

== See also ==
- List of castles in Austria
