= Burg Geyersberg =

Castle in Austria

- Carinthia, Austria
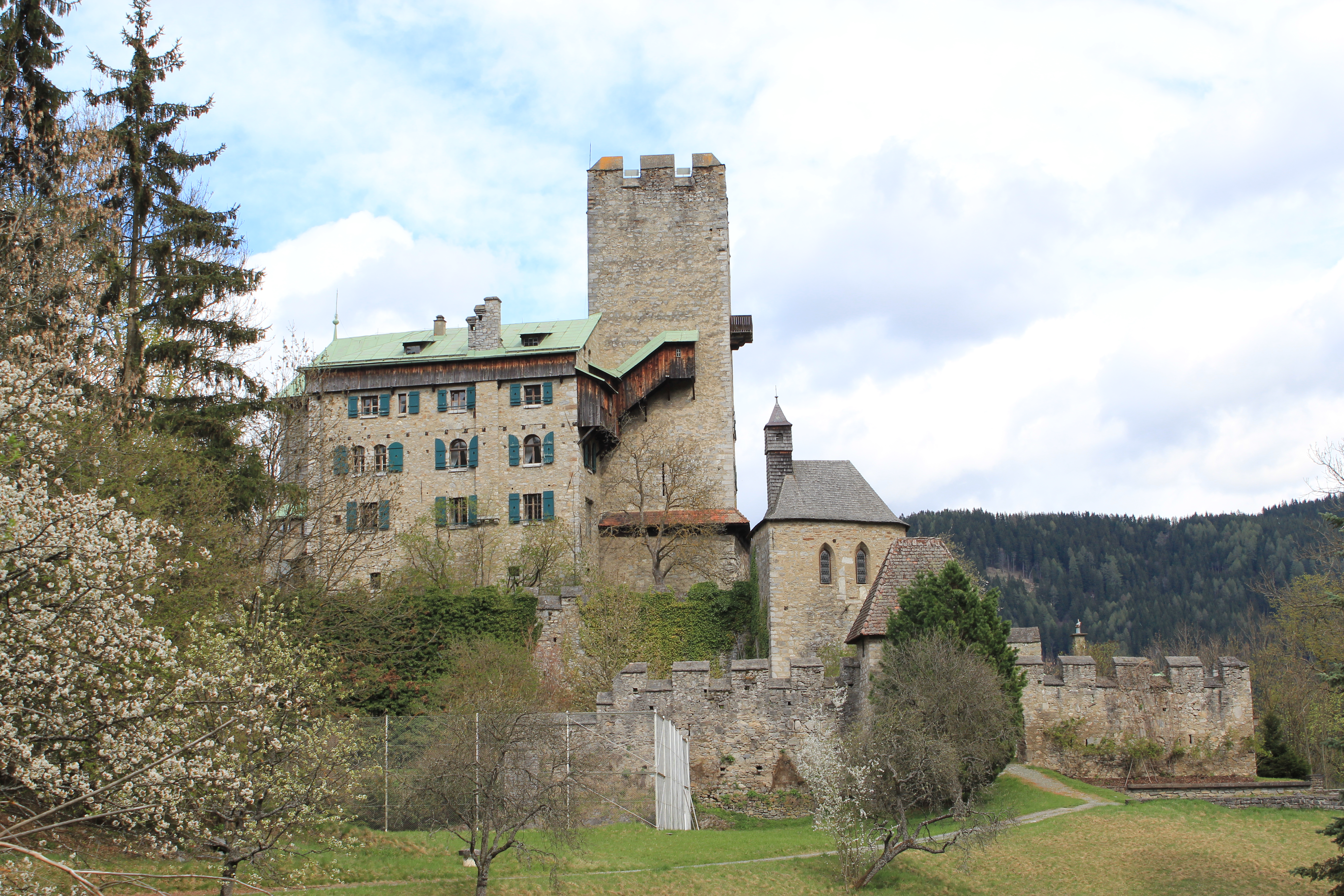

Site information
- Type: Rock castle

Location
- Coordinates: 46°57′23″N 14°23′57″E

Site history
- Built: around 1130

Burg Geyersberg is a castle in Carinthia, Austria. It stands on a steep rocky outcrop on the northern edge of the town. The outcrop drops steeply on three sides; only to the west does a shallow saddle lead down to the Krewenze stream, from where a nearly level path leads to the castle. The castle is privately owned and not open to the public.

== See also ==
- List of castles in Austria
