= Burg Plankenstein =

Castle in Lower Austria

Coordinates: 48°01′28″N 15°16′45″E

- Lower Austria, Austria
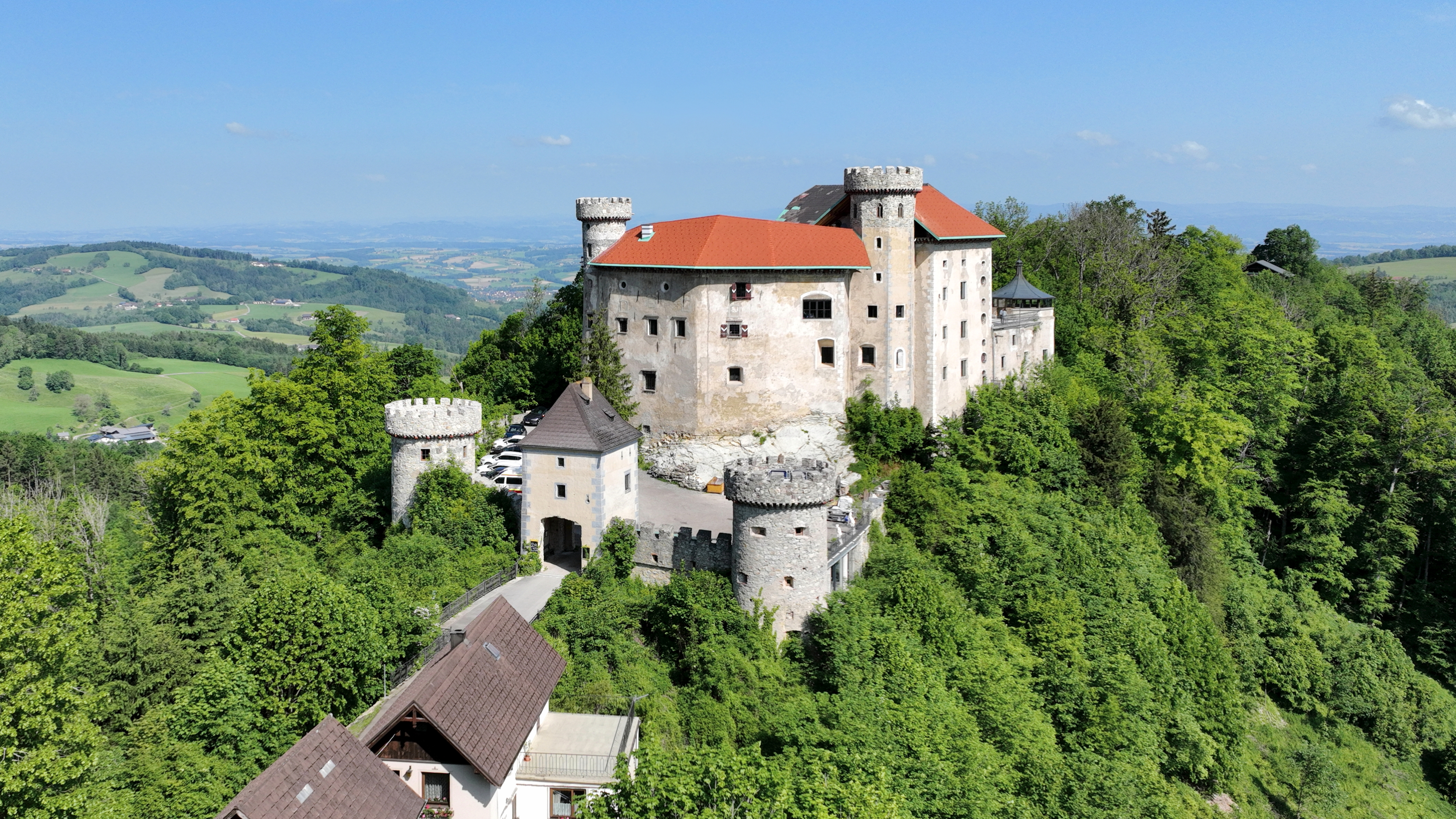
- Southeast view of Plankenstein Castle

Site information
- Type: Castle

Burg Plankenstein is a castle in Lower Austria, Austria. Burg Plankenstein is 657 metres (2,156 ft) above sea level.

== See also ==
- List of castles in Austria
