= Burg Grünfels =

Castle in Austria

Coordinates: 47.1076°N 14.1661°E

- Styria, Austria
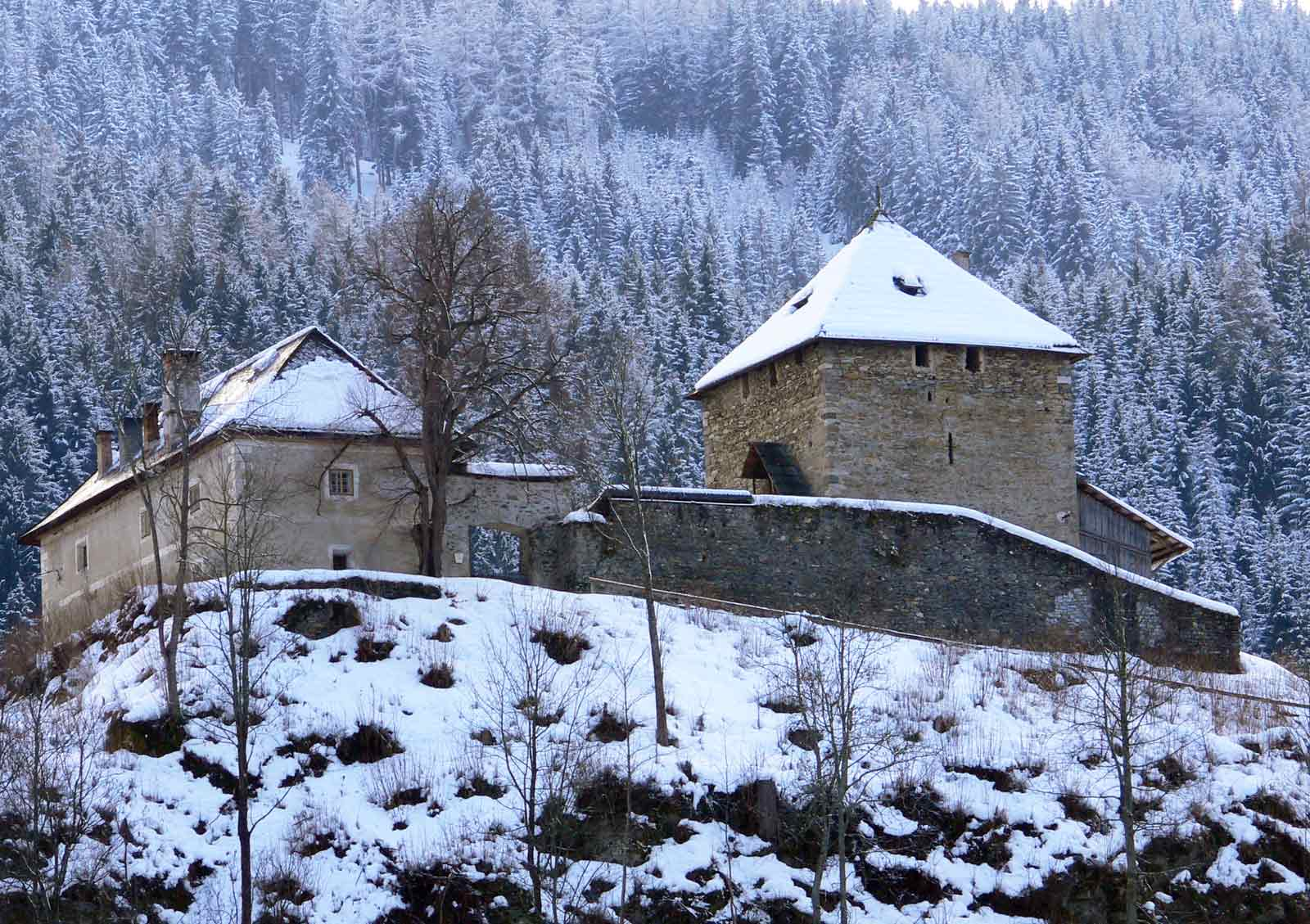

Site information
- Type: Castle

Site history
- Built: first mentioned 1366

Burg Grünfels is a castle in Murau, Styria, Austria.

== See also ==
- List of castles in Austria
