= Burgruine Lichtengraben/Painburg =

Castle ruins in Austria

Coordinates: 46.985°N 14.782°E

- Carinthia, Austria
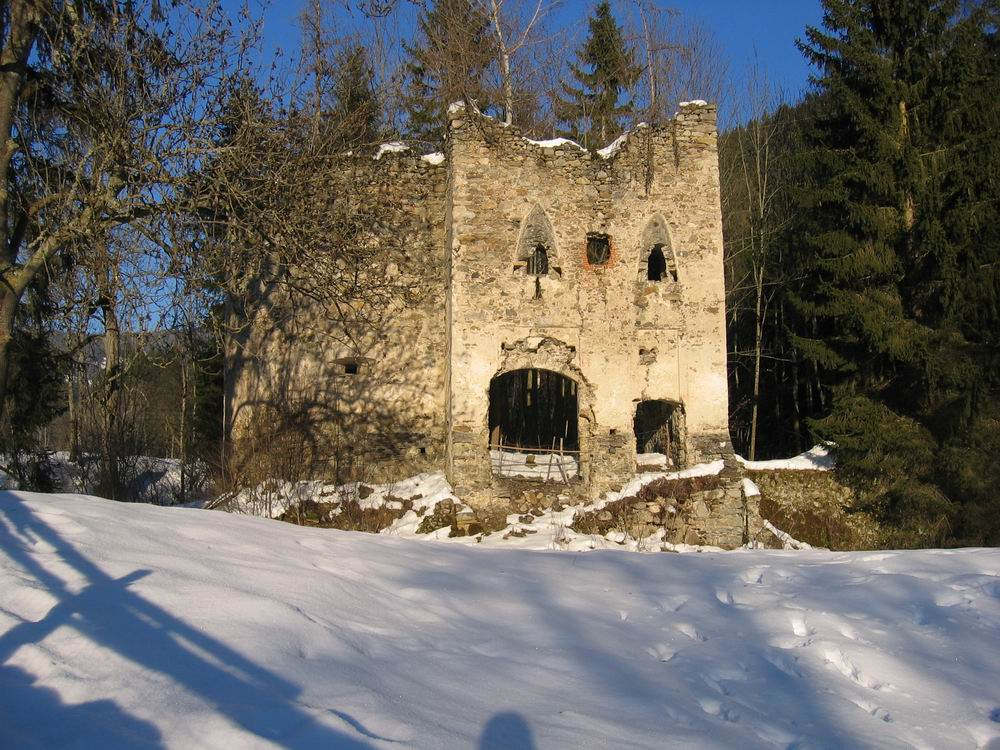

Site information
- Type: Castle
- Condition: Ruin

Site history
- Built: 1544

Burgruine Lichtengraben/Painburg is a castle in Carinthia, Austria.

== See also ==
- List of castles in Austria
