= Salzkammergut Mountains =

Mountain range in Austria

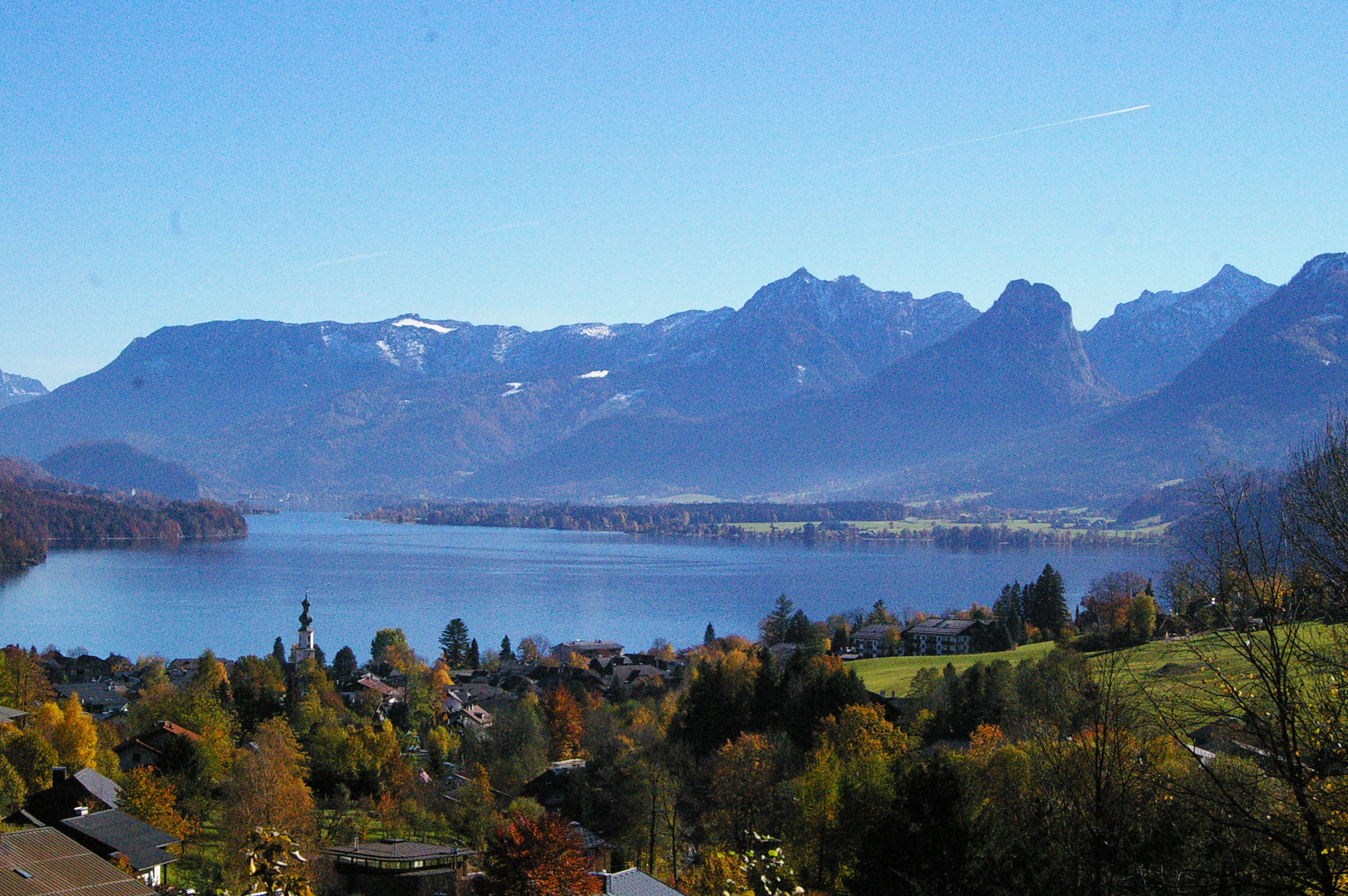
- View from Sankt Gilgen over Wolfgangsee

Highest point
- Peak: Gamsfeld
- Elevation: 2,027 m (6,650 ft)
- Coordinates: 47°37′24″N 13°28′50″E

Geography
- Country: Austria
- Region(s): Salzburg, Upper Austria
- Range coordinates: 47°42′00″N 13°35′00″E
- Parent range: Northern Limestone Alps; Salzkammergut and Upper Austria Alps

The Salzkammergut Mountains (German: Salzkammergut-Berge) are a mountain range of the Northern Limestone Alps, located in the Austrian states of Salzburg and Upper Austria. They are named after the Salzkammergut historic region, part of the Hallstatt-Dachstein / Salzkammergut Cultural Landscape UNESCO World Heritage Site.

== Geography ==
According to the Alpine Club classification of the Eastern Alps, the Salzkammergut Mountains (AVE 17a) lie to the east of the Berchtesgaden Alps and the city of Salzburg.

To the north the Austrian Alpine Foreland is the boundary, between the points where the rivers Salzach and Traun spill out into the Foreland near Salzburg and Gmunden respectively. To the east the boundary with the Upper Austrian Prealps is formed by the Traun between the lakes of Traunsee and, further downstream, with the Totes Gebirge by the Lake Hallstatt on the foot of the Dachstein Mountains. To the south the border runs from Lake Hallstatt up the Gosau Valley to Gschütt Pass, and from there downhill along the Rußbach Valley, separating the Salzkammergut Mountains from the Tennengebirge in the southwest, and the Lammer creek to its confluence with the Salzach near Golling. To the west the boundary runs along the River Salzach from where it is joined by the Lammer down to the city of Salzburg.

The highest peak with an elevation of 2,027 m (6,650 ft) is Mt. Gamsfeld near Gschütt Pass in the south, the only two-thousander of the range. The best-known mountain however is the prominent Schafberg 1,782 m (5,846 ft) on Wolfgangsee, with access to the summit provided by the Schafberg Railway.

== See also ==
- Limestone Alps
- Eastern Alps
- Geography of the Alps
