= Joseph Mohr =

Austrian priest and composer (1792–1848)

The Reverend Joseph Mohr
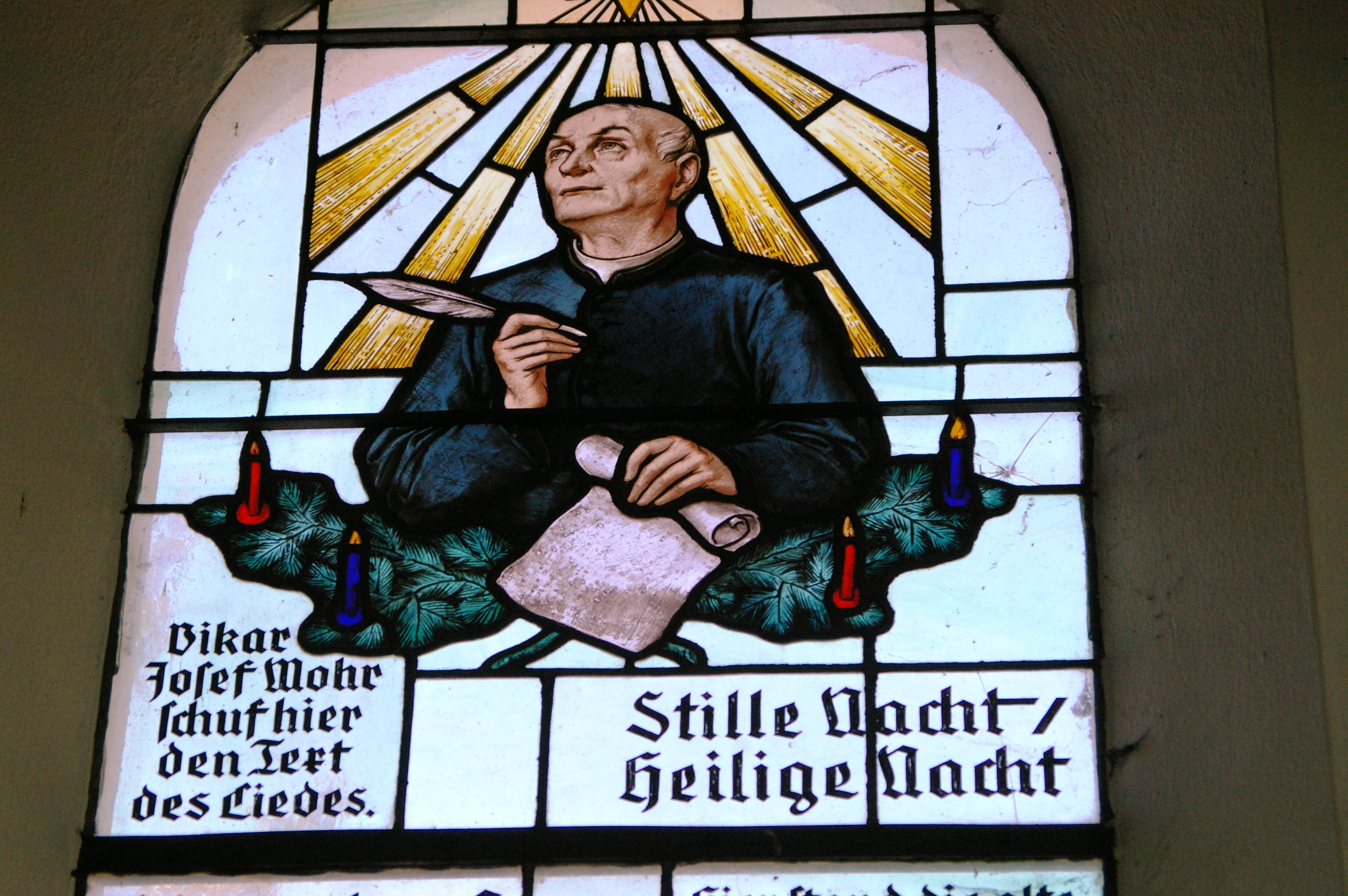
- Born: 11 December 1792; Salzburg, Archduchy of Austria, Holy Roman Empire of the German Nation
- Died: 4 December 1848 (aged 55); Wagrain, Empire of Austria, German Confederation
- Occupations: Priest, hymn writer
- Theological work
- Tradition or movement: Catholic Church

Josephus Franciscus Mohr, sometimes spelled Josef (11 December 1792 – 4 December 1848), was an Austrian Catholic priest and writer who wrote the words to the Christmas carol "Silent Night."

== Early life and education ==
Silent Night (Stille Nacht)
Choral version by United States Army Chorus

Mohr was born in Salzburg on 11 December 1792, to an unmarried embroiderer, Anna Schoiberin, and Franz Mohr, a mercenary soldier and deserter, who abandoned Joseph's mother before the birth. The ancestors on his father's side came from the town of Mariapfarr in the mountainous Lungau region south of Salzburg, while his mother's family was from the salt-mining city of Hallein. At his baptism shortly after birth, the godfather was recorded as Joseph Wohlmuth, the last official executioner of Salzburg, who did not personally attend but had himself represented by one Franziska Zachin. As the parents were unmarried, Joseph received the name of his godfather, according to custom.

Johann Nepomuk Hiernle, vicar and leader of music at Salzburg Cathedral, enabled Mohr to have an education and encouraged him in music. As a boy, Mohr would serve simultaneously as a singer and violinist in the choirs of the University Church and at the Benedictine monastery church of St. Peter. From 1808 to 1810, Mohr studied at the Benedictine monastery of Kremsmünster in the province of Upper Austria. He then returned to Salzburg to attend the Lyceum school, and in 1811, he entered the seminary. Since he was of illegitimate birth, a special dispensation by the pope was required in those days for him to attend seminary. On 21 August 1815, Mohr graduated and was ordained as a priest.

== Father Mohr ==
In the autumn of 1815, Mohr was asked to provide temporary help in the village of Ramsau near Berchtesgaden. Mohr then served as assistant priest in Mariapfarr (1815–1817). It was during this time, in 1816, that he penned the words to "Silent Night" in Mariapfarr. Poor health forced him to return to Salzburg in the summer of 1817. After a short recuperation he began serving as an assistant priest at the Nikolauskirche in Oberndorf, where he made the acquaintance of Franz Gruber, schoolteacher in neighbouring Arnsdorf.

=== Stille Nacht ===
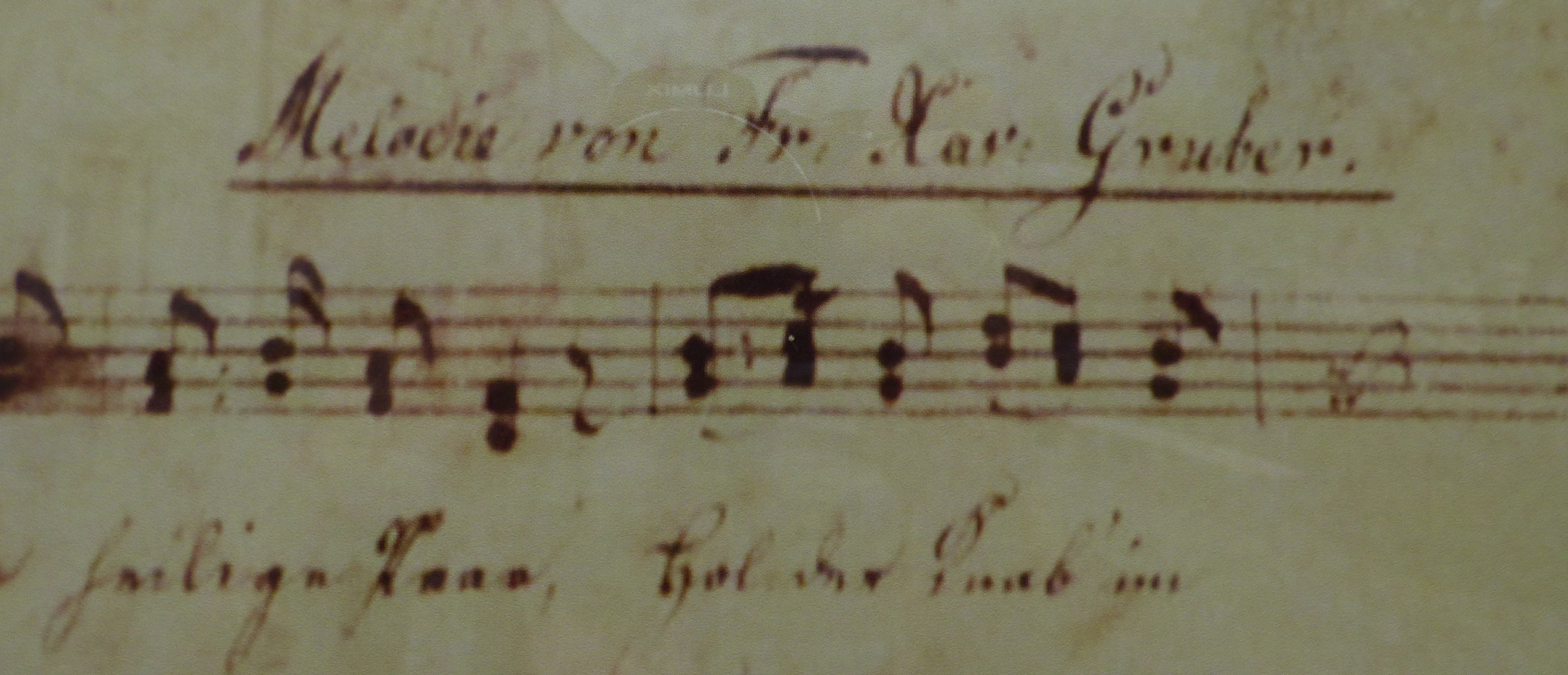
Stille Nacht by Joseph Mohr

On a cold Christmas Eve in 1818, Mohr walked the three kilometres from his home in Oberndorf bei Salzburg to visit his friend Franz Xaver Gruber in the neighbouring town of Arnsdorf bei Laufen. Mohr brought with him a poem he had written some two years earlier. He needed a carol for the Christmas Eve midnight Mass that was only a few hours away, and hoped his friend, a school teacher who also served as the church's choir master and organist, could set his poem to music.

The song was sung at Midnight Mass in a simple arrangement for guitar and choir. Various legends have sprung up over the years concerning the genesis of "Silent Night", but the simplest and likeliest explanation seems to have been that Mohr simply wanted an original song that he could play on his favourite instrument, the guitar. Within a few years, arrangements of the carol appeared in churches in the Salzburg Archdiocese and folk singers from the Ziller Valley were taking the composition on tours around Europe.

== Later life ==
Mohr, a generous man who donated most of his salary to charity, was moved from place to place, and remained in Oberndorf only until 1819. After Oberndorf he was sent to Kuchl, followed by stays in Golling an der Salzach, Bad Vigaun, Adnet and Anthering. In 1827 he was made pastor of Hintersee, and in 1837 of the Alpine village of Wagrain. Here he created a fund to allow children from poor families to attend school and set up a system for the care of the elderly. Mohr died of respiratory disease on 4 December 1848, at the age of 55.

== Legacy ==
Mohr's final resting place is in the tiny Alpine ski resort of Wagrain, where he died in 1848. The Joseph Mohr School stands as a fitting memorial, and close to the grave of the man who wrote the words heard around the world. The village school is named after him and his grave has been kept in a place of honour in the nearby churchyard cemetery. An outdoor exhibit detailing the life of Joseph Mohr is situated on the walkway between the church and the parish house where he once lived. In 2006, the town's Waggerl Museum set up a permanent exhibit – Joseph Mohr – Vicar of Wagrain.

In Austria, Stille Nacht is considered a national treasure. Traditionally, the song may not be played publicly before Christmas Eve.

Until 2006, it was thought that Mohr and Gruber had collaborated on just one composition, but another was located in the Wagrain parish archive by the Salzburg Archdiocesan authorities. The "Te Deum" with text by Joseph Mohr and melody by Franz Xaver Gruber can be heard in an audio exhibit at the Waggerl Museum in Wagrain.
