= Tennen Mountains =

Mountain range in the Northern Limestone Alps

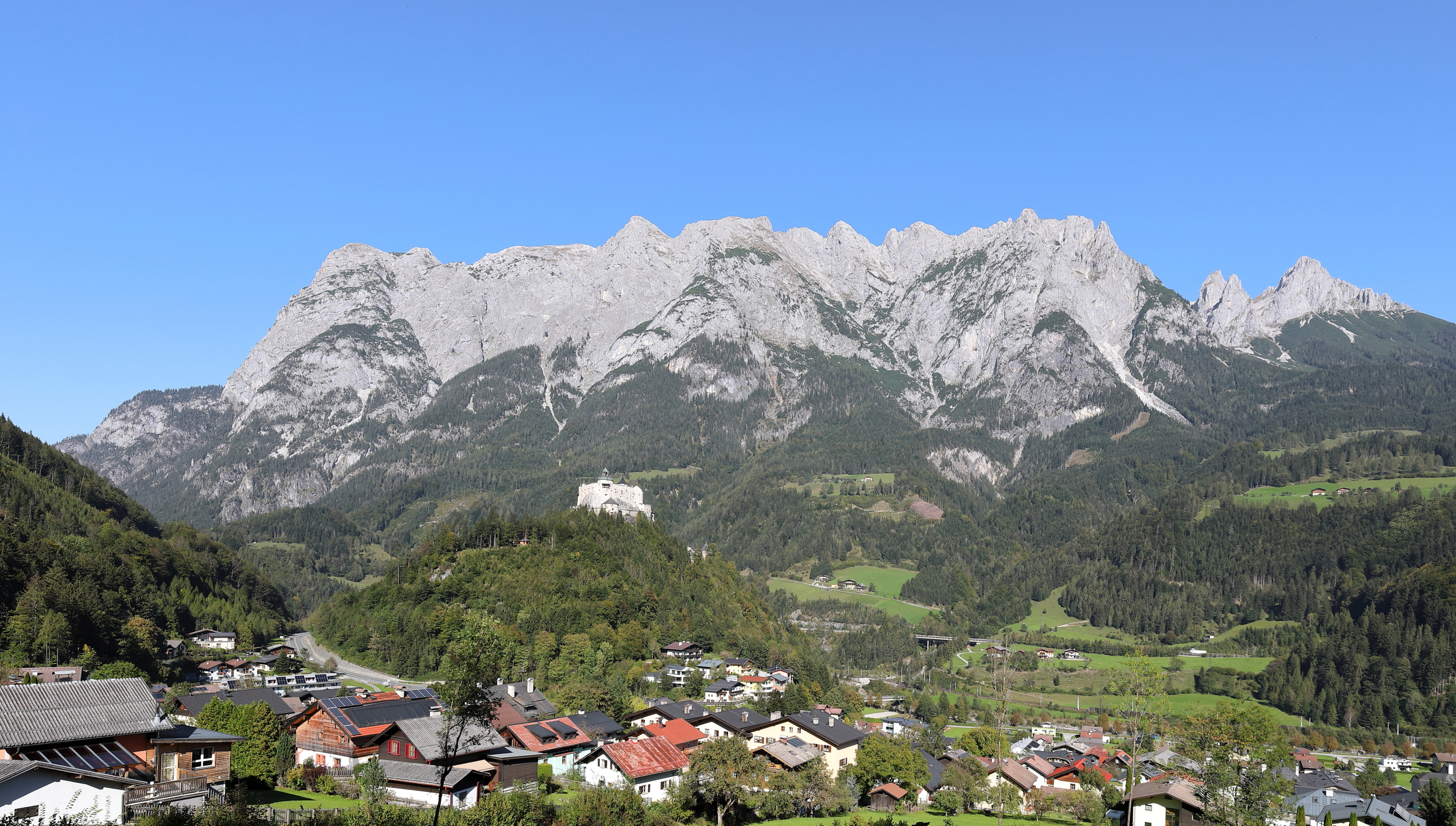
- Southwest view

Highest point
- Peak: Raucheck
- Elevation: 2,430 m (7,970 ft)

Dimensions
- Length: 15 km (9.3 mi)

Geography
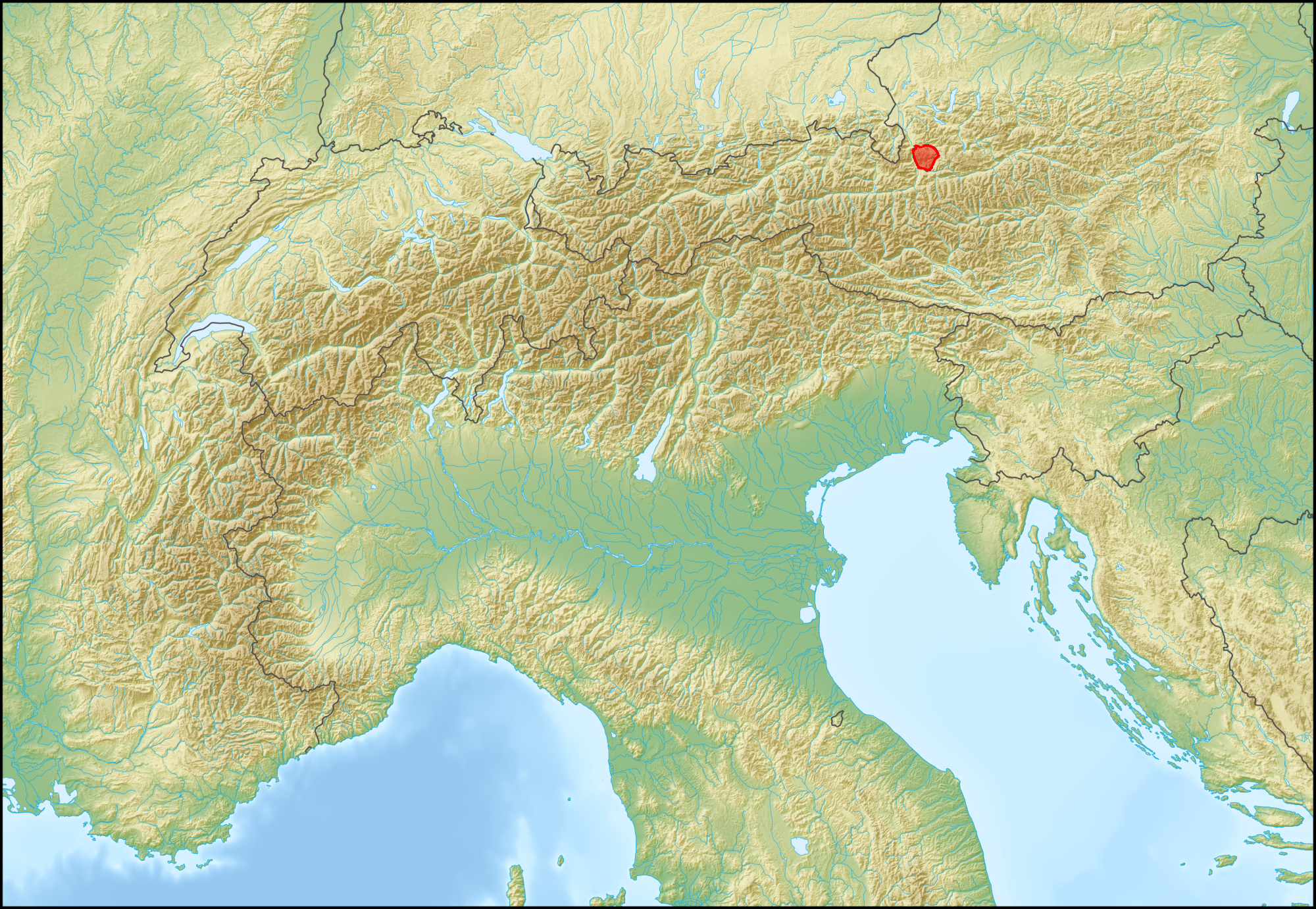
- Tennen Mountains (in red) within the Alps. The borders of the range according to Alpine Club classification of the Eastern Alps
- Location: Northern Limestone Alps, Salzburg, Austria
- Country: Austria
- Range coordinates: 47°30′N 13°14′E

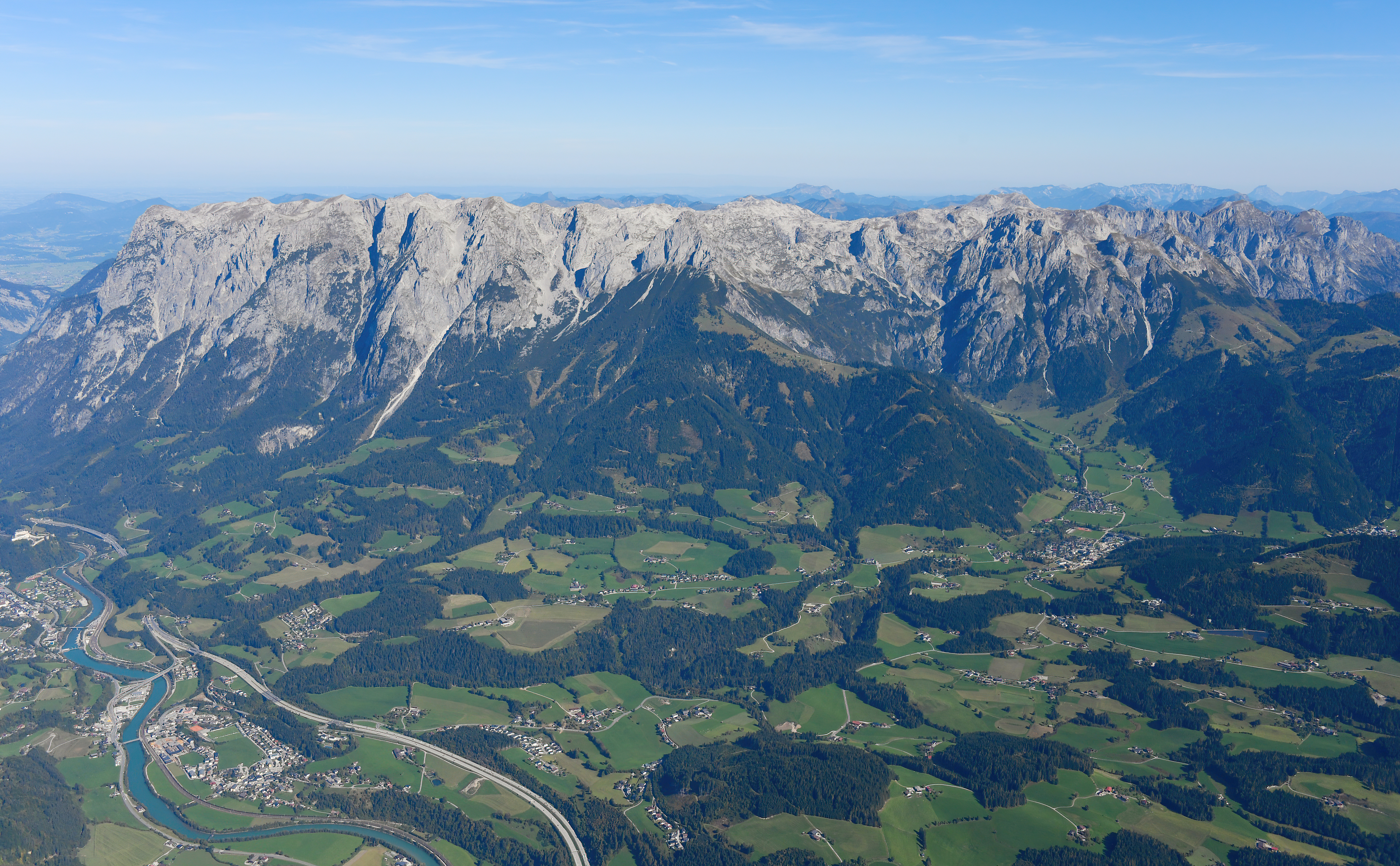
Aerial view of the Tennen Mountains

The Tennen Mountains (German: Tennengebirge) is a small, but rugged, mountain range in the Northern Limestone Alps, which lies in front of the Eastern Alps for its entire length. It is a very heavily karstified high plateau, about 60 km² in area, with many caves. The range is located in Austria in the district of Salzburg near Bischofshofen.

Some 37 square kilometres of the Tennen plateau are above the 2,000 metre line and that part of the range within the state of Salzburg was turned into a nature reserve in 1982.

== Extent and neighbouring ranges ==
The outline of the Tennen range is formed:

- in the west by the Hagen Mountains, a part of the Berchtesgaden Alps, separated by the Salzach river. Here, at the northern end of the Lueg Pass, is the narrowest point of the Salzachöfen Gorge through the Limestone Alps.
- in the north and northeast by the River Lammer as far as the Rußbach stream, which descends from the Gschütt Pass. Beyond the Lammer is the Osterhorn Group (Salzkammergut Mountains)
- in the east by the Lammer valley as far as Lungötz, separating it from the Dachstein Mountains
- in the south it borders on part of the Salzburg Slate Alps right of the Salzach (Hochgründeck, Roßbrand) along the line from Karbach to St. Martin – Fritzbach – Salzach to Bischofshofen

=== Valley settlements ===
- Werfen
- Pfarrwerfen
- Werfenweng
- Sankt Martin am Tennengebirge
- Annaberg-Lungötz
- Abtenau
- Scheffau am Tennengebirge
- Golling

== Summit ==
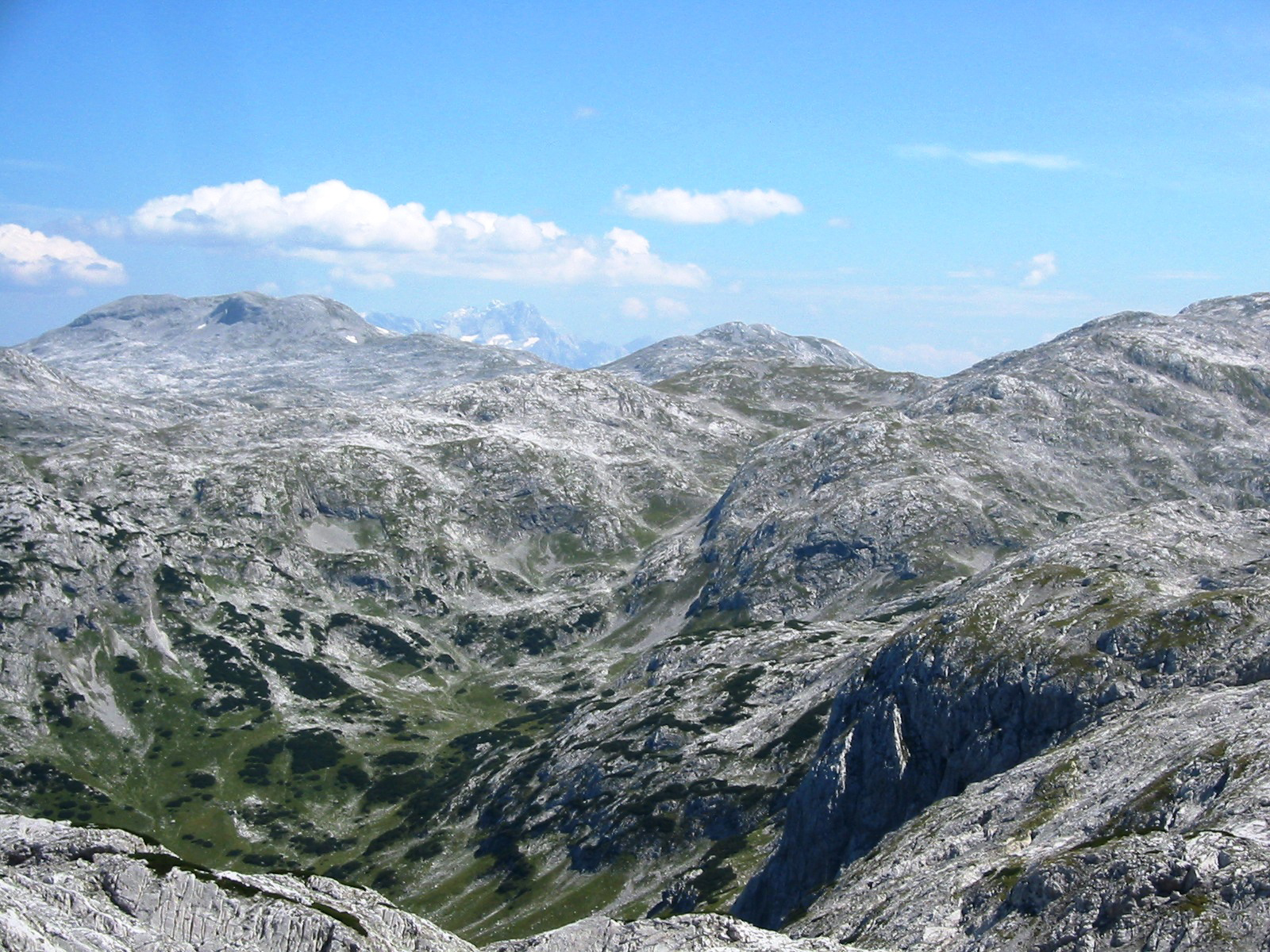
View of the karst terrain of the Tennen Mountains looking southeast. In the background: the Hoher Dachstein

The highest mountains in the Tennen are Raucheck (2,430 m above sea level (AA)) in the west and Bleikogel (2,412 m above sea level (AA)) in the east. The highest points all rise on the southern edge of the plateau, which falls away to the north. The most important peaks are:

- Raucheck (2,430 m)
- Lehnender Stein (2,402 m)
- Pfaffenleitnkopf (2,370 m)
- Werfener Hochthron (2,363 m)
- Fritzerkogel (2,360 m)
- Streitmandl (2,360 m)
- Schubbühel (2,334 m)
- Tiroler Kogel (2,324 m)
- Eiskogel (2,321 m)
- Brietkogel (2,316 m)
- Wieselstein (2,300 m)
- Scheiblingkogel (2,290 m)
- Hochkogel (2,283 m)
- Fieberhorn (2,278 m)
- Tauernkogel (2,247 m)
- Knallstein (2,234 m)
- Hochkarfelderkopf (2,219 m)
- Breitstein (2,161 m)
- Tagweide (2,128 m)
- Edelweißkogel (2,030 m)

== Geology ==
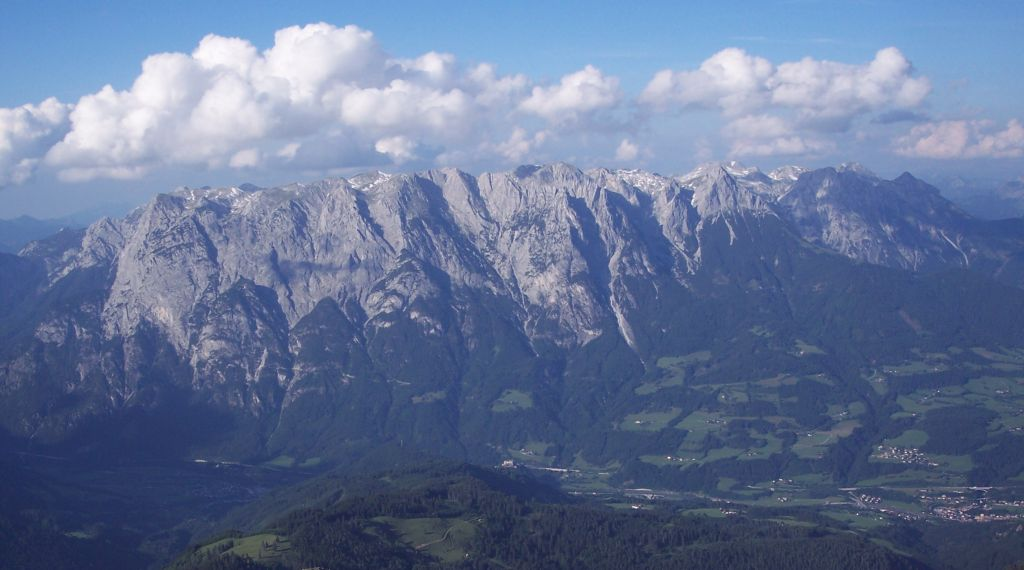
The Tennen Mountains from the southwest, on the right the hill zone of Werfen-St.-Martin Schuppen Zone

The Tennen is a heavily karstified massif, composed mainly of Dachstein limestone lying on a foundation of Ramsau Dolomite.

Its southern foothills, along the line Lungötz–Werfenweng–Werfen, belong to an imbricate zone (Schuppenzone). This zone, made of Werfen Formation from the Lower Triassic and middle triadic dolomites (Anisian, Ladinian), is called the Werfen-St.-Martin Schuppen Zone.

=== Caves ===
There are numerous caves in the Tennen Mountains.

- The most famous is the Eisriesenwelt near Werfen, which is about 42 km long and is the largest ice cave in the world. Its ice section is open to the public as a show cave.
- The best-known caves near valley level are the Brunnecker Cave on Lueg Pass, the Winnerfall Cave near Oberscheffau and the Trickl Cave near Abtenau. These are active water caves which can become flooded during snowmelt or other periods of high water level.
- Another important cave system is the Platteneckeis Cave–Berger Cave–Bierloch system in the northwest of the mountain block. This system drains towards the Brunnecker Cave, dropping through a height of over 1,000 metres.
- Other important caves are the Schneeloch on the Kuchelbergalm
- and the Eiskogel Cave, which crosses the mountain of the same name on the southern edge of the Tennen

The Tennen Mountains are a preferred research region for the State Cave Research Association in Salzburg, which collects and publishes results of its research. New caves are continually being found, but even old, well-known caves sometimes reveal new secrets.

Knowledge of the caves, and the routes that water takes through them, is important, particularly in terms of future water supply for the population and the protection of water resources.

== Walking and climbing ==
Being a high plateau, the Tennen has numerous trails for the Alpine hiker. However, walkers need to be aware of the lack of water in the karst terrain and the dangers of getting lost in mist or fog. Alpine experience and a good level of fitness are basic pre-requisites, even though there are many mountain huts available. The precipices on the edge of the plateau offer the climber a wide scope of climbing options. The faces on the southern edge of the range, especially around the Werfener Hut and above Dr. Heinrich Hackel Hut are very popular due to their easy accessibility. In winter there are various ski touring routes, mainly crossing the plateau, but also extreme ski routes in some places.

=== Huts ===
- Anton Proksch House (1,590 m)
- Dr. Friedrich Oedl House (1,575 m)
- Dr. Heinrich Hackel Hut (1,530 m)
- Edelweißer Hut (2,350 m)
- Elmaualm (1,520 m)
- Freilassing Hut (1,550 m)
- Gsengalm Hut (1,450 m)
- Gwechenberg Hut (1,365 m)
- Laufen Hut (1,725 m)
- Leopold Happisch House (1,925 m)
- Mahdegg Alm (1,200 m)
- Rossberghütte (1,000 m)
- Stefan Schatzl Hut (1,340 m)
- Werfen Hut (1,970 m)

=== Long distance trails ===
The European long-distance trail E4/North Alpine Way 01/Via Alpina (Violet Trail Stage A34/35) runs through the southern Tennen, from Lungötz to Werfen via the Dr. Heinrich Hackel Hut.

In addition Salzburg's Arno Way runs along the west of the group (Section 6 Kalkberge Ost, Stage 52 Annaberg Laufener Hut and 53 to Abtenau).
