= Burg Golling =

Castle in the state of Salzburg, Austria

Coordinates: 47°35′51″N 13°10′04″E

Golling Castle
- Burg Golling
- Golling an der Salzach, Salzburg, Austria
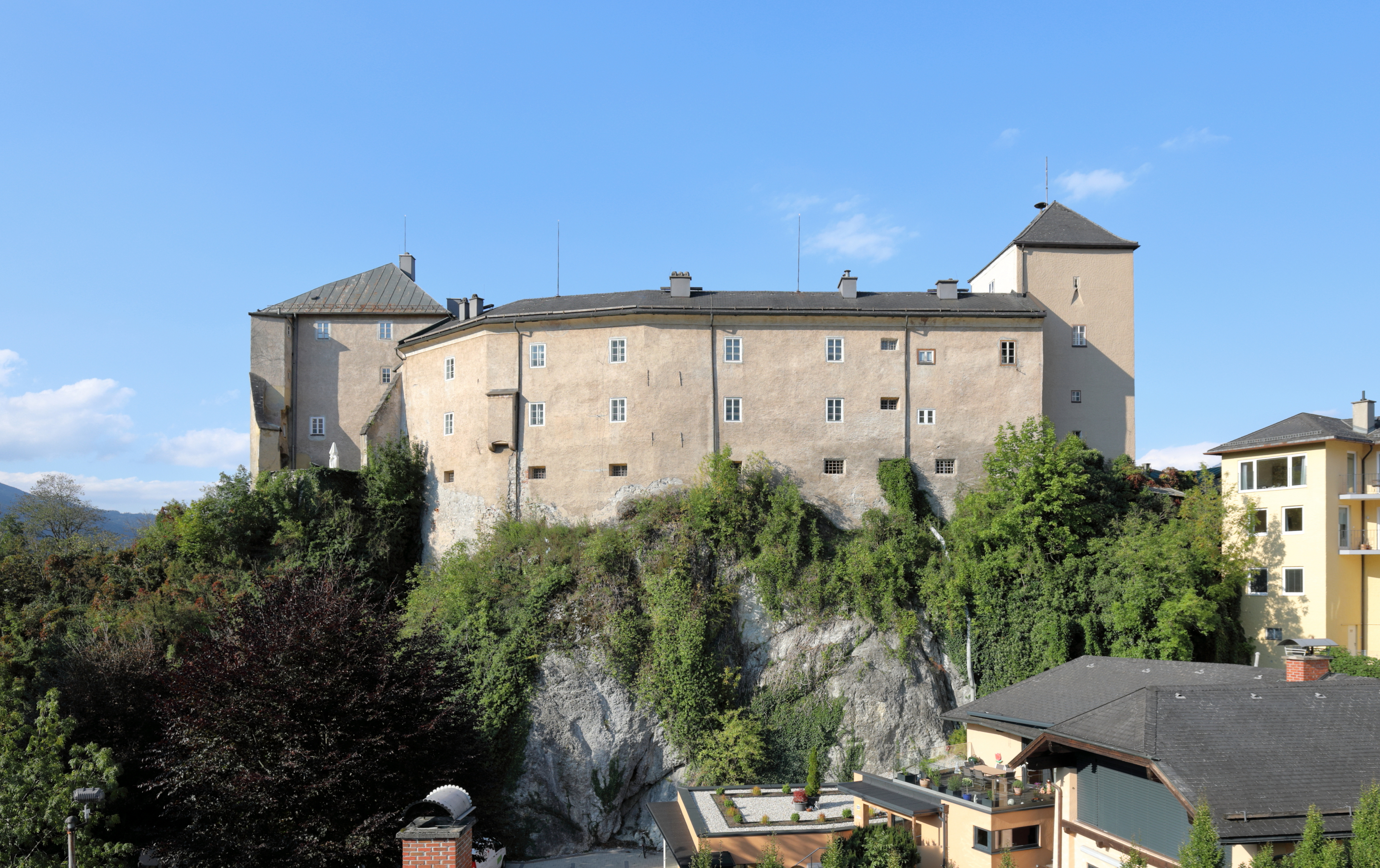
- View from the south

Site information
- Type: Hill castle
- Open to the public: Yes
- Condition: Preserved

Location
- Height: 469 metres (1,539 ft)

Site history
- Built: 13th century
- Built by: Prince-archbishops of Salzburg

Burg Golling is a castle in Golling an der Salzach, in the Austrian state of Salzburg, erected by the Prince-Archbishops of Salzburg in the 13th century. The large fortress is located on a rock above the Salzach valley near the strategically important narrows between the Hagen and Tennen Mountains, at 469 metres (1,539 ft) above sea level.

== See also ==
- List of castles in Austria
