= Lueg Pass =

- Pass Lueg
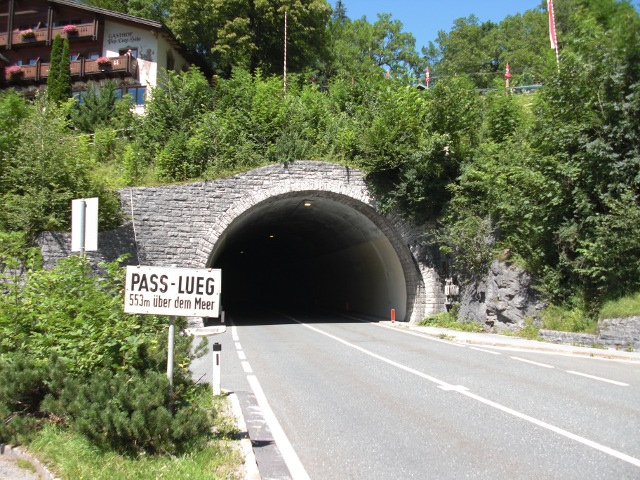
- Highway 159 tunnel through Lueg Pass

- Location within Austria
- Elevation: 552 metres (1,811 ft)

Third Approach
- Location: Salzburg, Austria
- Coordinates: 47°34′32″N 13°11′31″E

Lueg Pass (German: Pass Lueg [ˈpas ˈluːɛɡ]) is a mountain pass or defile above the Salzachöfen Gorge in Salzburg State, Austria. The pass is at the western edge of the Tennen Mountains and is approximately 100 m (330 ft) above the Salzach river where Salzachöfen is at its narrowest. The terms Lueg Pass and Salzachöfen are sometimes used interchangeably to refer to the whole canyon. Lueg Pass, providing a natural access through the narrow gap, was historically one of the primary routes across the Northern Limestone Alps.

== Geography ==
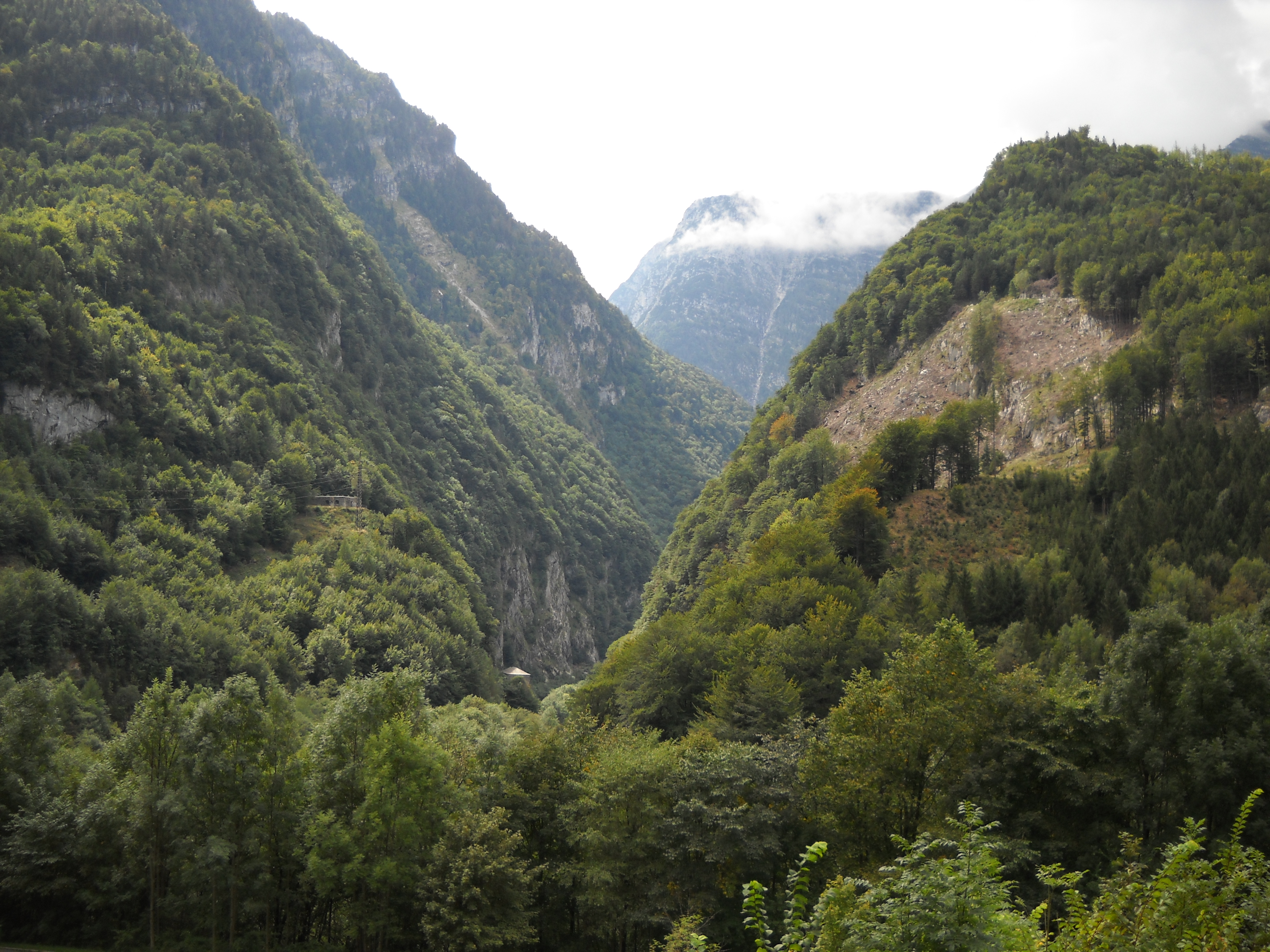
View southwest from Lueg Pass

The Northern Limestone Alps are a northern parallel subrange of the Central Eastern Alps. The Berchtesgaden Alps, a constituent range of these mountains, form a barrier for north–south travel in the region. The Salzach river carves a deep valley through the mountains that culminates at Salzachöfen Gorge. Here, the banks of the Salzach become impassable and the route following the eastern edge of the river rises approximately 100 m (330 ft) above the river to avoid its most treacherous section before descending back down to the river. The highest point of this route is traditionally known as Lueg Pass.

Lueg Pass is located approximately 3 km (1.9 mi) south of Golling an der Salzach in Hallein District, Salzburg. Lueg Pass is crossed by Highway B159 (Salzachtal Straße) as it follows the Salzach. The highway rises to an elevation of 552 m (1,811 ft) and enters a 150 m (490 ft)-long tunnel parallel to the narrowest point of the Salzachöfen Gorge. A hotel is presently located at the height of the pass, above the tunnel. Both the A10 motorway and Salzburg-Tyrol Railway, though largely following the Salzach valley, bypass the narrow Lueg Pass through parallel tunnels under the Hagen Mountains on the opposite side of the Salzach.

== History ==
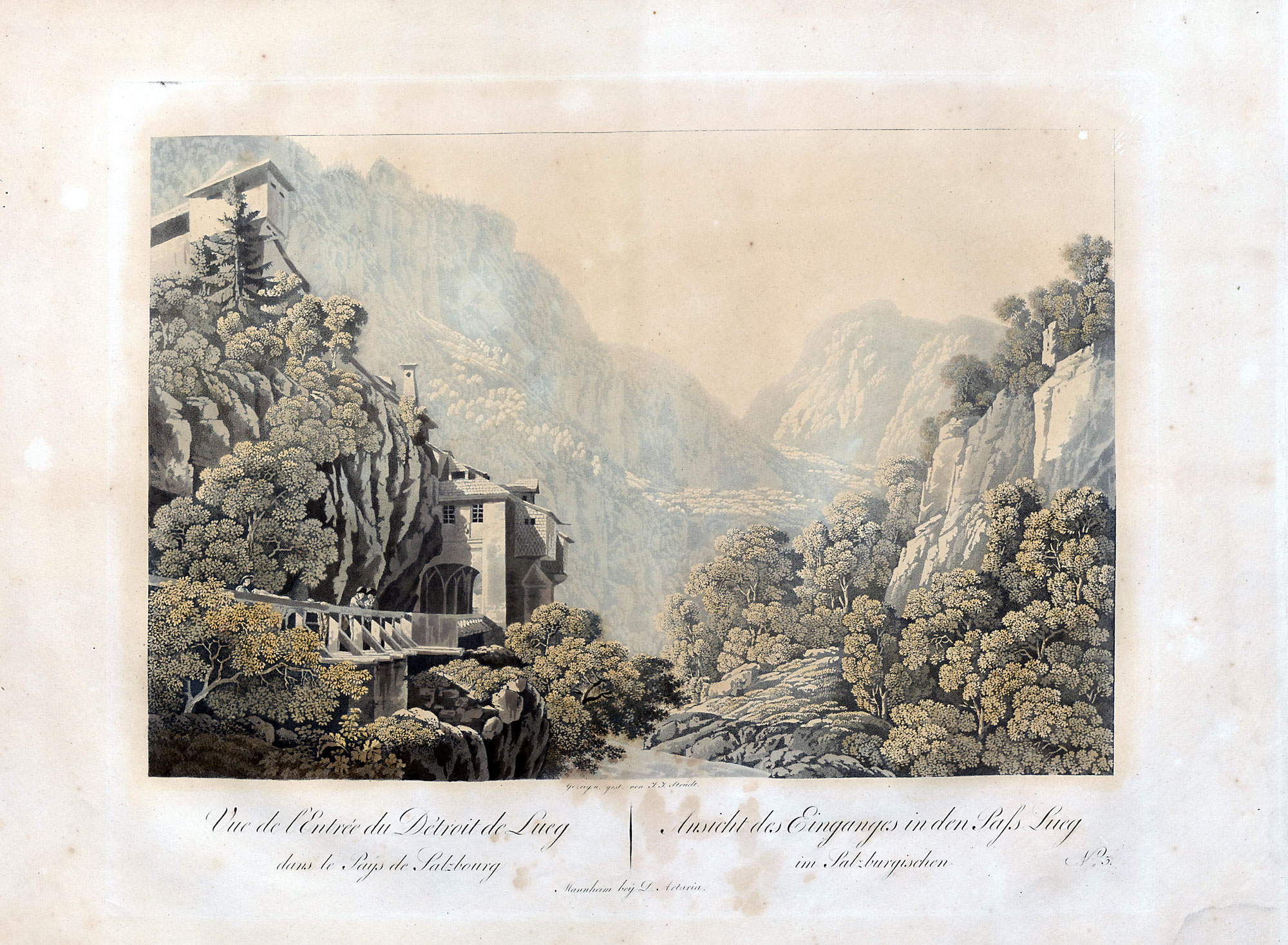
An 18th-century painting of Lueg Pass

Lueg Pass and the surrounding Salzach valley have been used as a transportation route since prehistoric times. The pass was crossed by a Roman road in ancient times.

During the Middle Ages, tollbooths were set up at the height of the pass to collect tolls from travelers and merchants passing through the bottleneck. The first record of a tollbooth dates to 1160 with recurring mentions up to Napoleonic times. Most of the associated tollbooth structures were removed by the 1930s.

By the 1970s, traffic through Lueg Pass had reached congestion levels during vacation months as it was located on the Gastarbeiterroute used by guest workers from the Balkans. The A10 motorway relieved congestion over Lueg Pass when it was completed in 1974, thereby bypassing the pass completely and reducing its importance as a transportation route.
