= St. Koloman (Salzburg) =

- Municipality
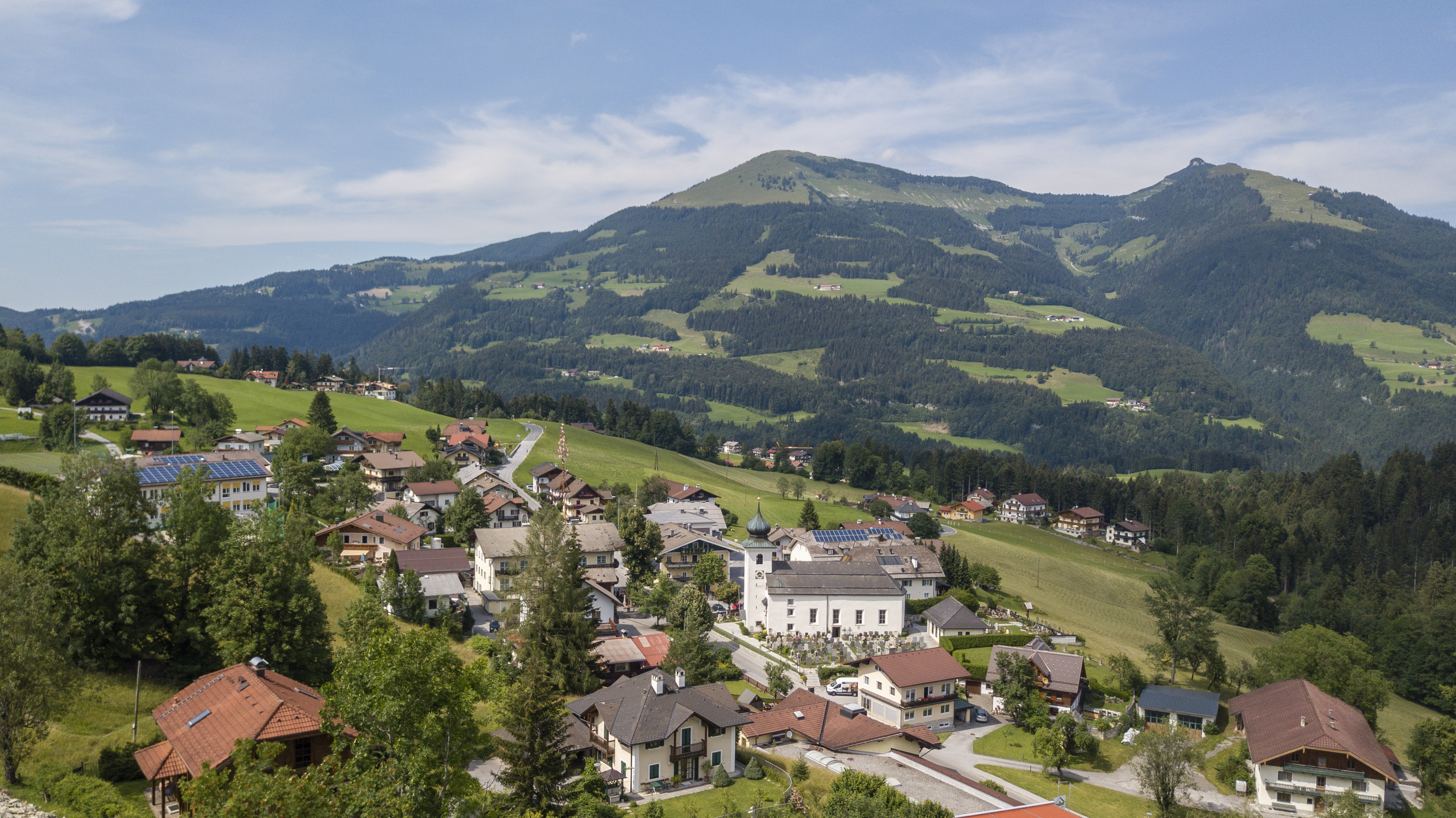
- View of Sankt Koloman above Salzach valley

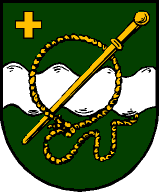
- Coat of arms

- Location within Austria
- Coordinates: 47°39′00″N 13°11′00″E
- Country: Austria
- State: Salzburg
- District: Hallein

Government
  - Mayor: Willi Wallinger (ÖVP)

Area
  - Total: 55.97 km^{2} (21.61 sq mi)
- Elevation: 848 m (2,782 ft)

Population (2018-01-01)
  - Total: 1,725
  - Density: 30.82/km^{2} (79.82/sq mi)
- Time zone: UTC+1 (CET)
  - Summer (DST): UTC+2 (CEST)
- Postal code: 5423
- Area code: +43 6241
- Vehicle registration: HA
- Website: www.stkoloman.salzburg.at

St. Koloman is a municipality in the Hallein district in the Austrian state of Salzburg.

== Geography ==
St. Koloman lies in the Tennengau on the high plateau of the Salzach valley between Bad Vigaun and Kuchl. Subdivisions are Oberlangenberg (previously known as Fürberg ), Taugl, and Tauglboden.
