= Scheffau am Tennengebirge =

- Municipality
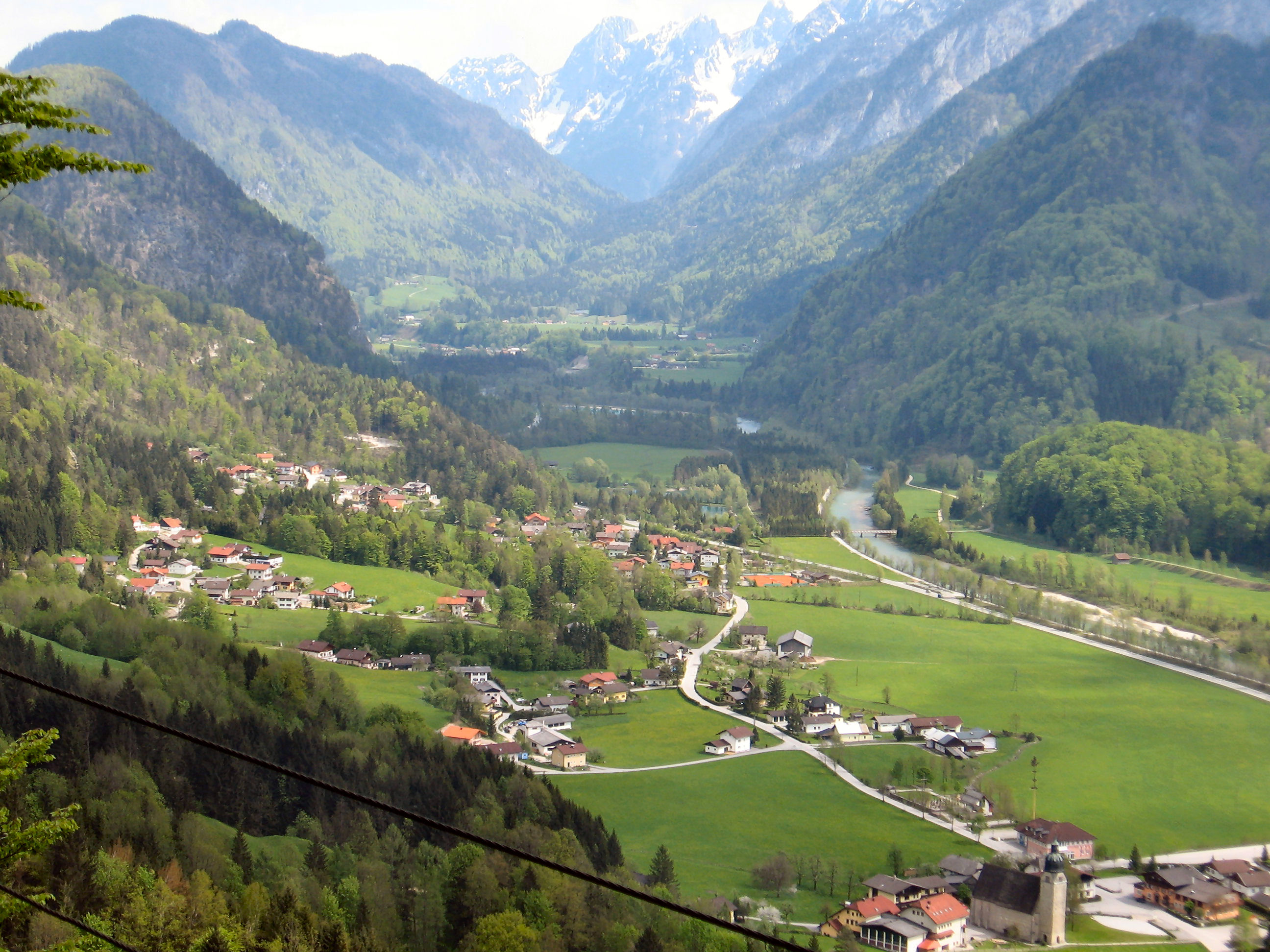

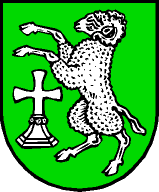
- Coat of arms

- Location within Austria
- Coordinates: 47°35′30″N 13°12′40″E
- Country: Austria
- State: Salzburg
- District: Hallein

Government
  - Mayor: Friedrich Stubreiter (ÖVP)

Area
  - Total: 69.67 km^{2} (26.90 sq mi)
- Elevation: 487 m (1,598 ft)

Population (2018-01-01)
  - Total: 1,395
  - Density: 20.02/km^{2} (51.86/sq mi)
- Time zone: UTC+1 (CET)
  - Summer (DST): UTC+2 (CEST)
- Postal code: 5440
- Area code: 06244
- Vehicle registration: HA
- Website: www.scheffau.salzburg.at

Scheffau am Tennengebirge is a municipality in the Hallein district of Salzburg, Austria.

== Geography ==
The municipality of Scheffau am Tennengebirge lies in the southern Tennengau of the Salzburger Land. The River Lammer flows through its territory. Its subordinate parishes are: Unterscheffau, Oberscheffau, Voregg, Wallingwinkl, Weitenau. Its Katastralgemeinden are Scheffau, Voregg und Weitenau.

The villages lies at the foot of the Tennengebirge mountain range that rises to a height of 2,300 m (7,500 ft) and, to the south, forms the boundary with Pongau. To the north the municipality includes part of the Ostern Group which is up to 1,600 m (5,200 ft) high. The centre of the municipality is in the Lammer valley in Unterscheffau and Oberscheffau.
