= Salzachöfen =

Gorge in Austria

- Salzachöfen Gorge
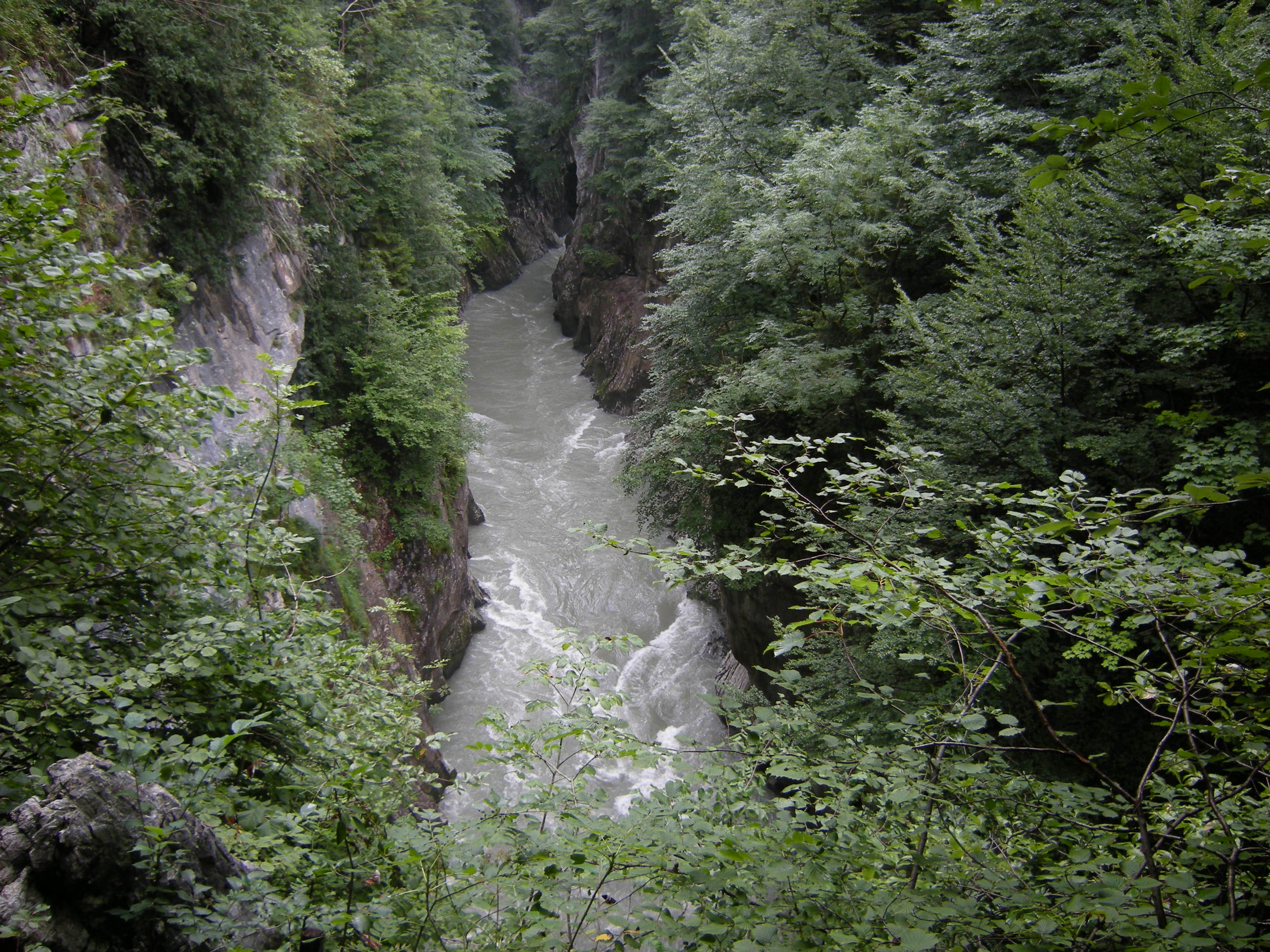
- The upper portion of the gorge

- Location within Austria
- Depth: 60 m (200 ft)

Geography
- Country: Austria
- State: Salzburg
- District: Hallein
- Coordinates: 47°34′38″N 13°11′25″E
- Interactive map of Salzachöfen

Salzachöfen, sometimes translated as Salzachöfen Gorge, is a narrow gorge in the Northern Limestone Alps of Salzburg State, Austria. The gap is formed by the Salzach River as it cuts between the Hagen Mountains and the Tennen Mountains. Lueg Pass provides a route along the Salzach above Salzachöfen. The terms Lueg Pass and Salzachöfen are sometimes used interchangeably to refer to the whole canyon.

The site is considered a Natural Monument of Austria.

== Geography ==
The Salzach river has its source in the Central Eastern Alps and flows easterly through a large valley before turning north towards the Berchtesgaden Alps. Here, the Salzach cuts a narrow valley between the Hagen Mountains to the west and the Tennen Mountains to the east, terminating in the deeply incised Salzachöfen. The gorge, at the narrowest point of the valley, is located on an S-bend where the Salzach briefly flows east before cutting west, then flowing north again. From this point north, the Salzach runs through mostly low-lying valleys. The Salzachöfen is located just south of Golling an der Salzach in the Hallein District of Salzburg.

== Access ==
Salzachöfen serves as a tourist attraction and can be accessed via a staircase and trail from Highway B159. A zipline crosses the gorge during summer months.

Whitewater kayaking is popular activity through the ravine, although the waters can be treacherous and deadly. Adolf Anderle's descent of Salzachöfen in 1931 is considered the birth of whitewater kayaking.

== Gallery ==
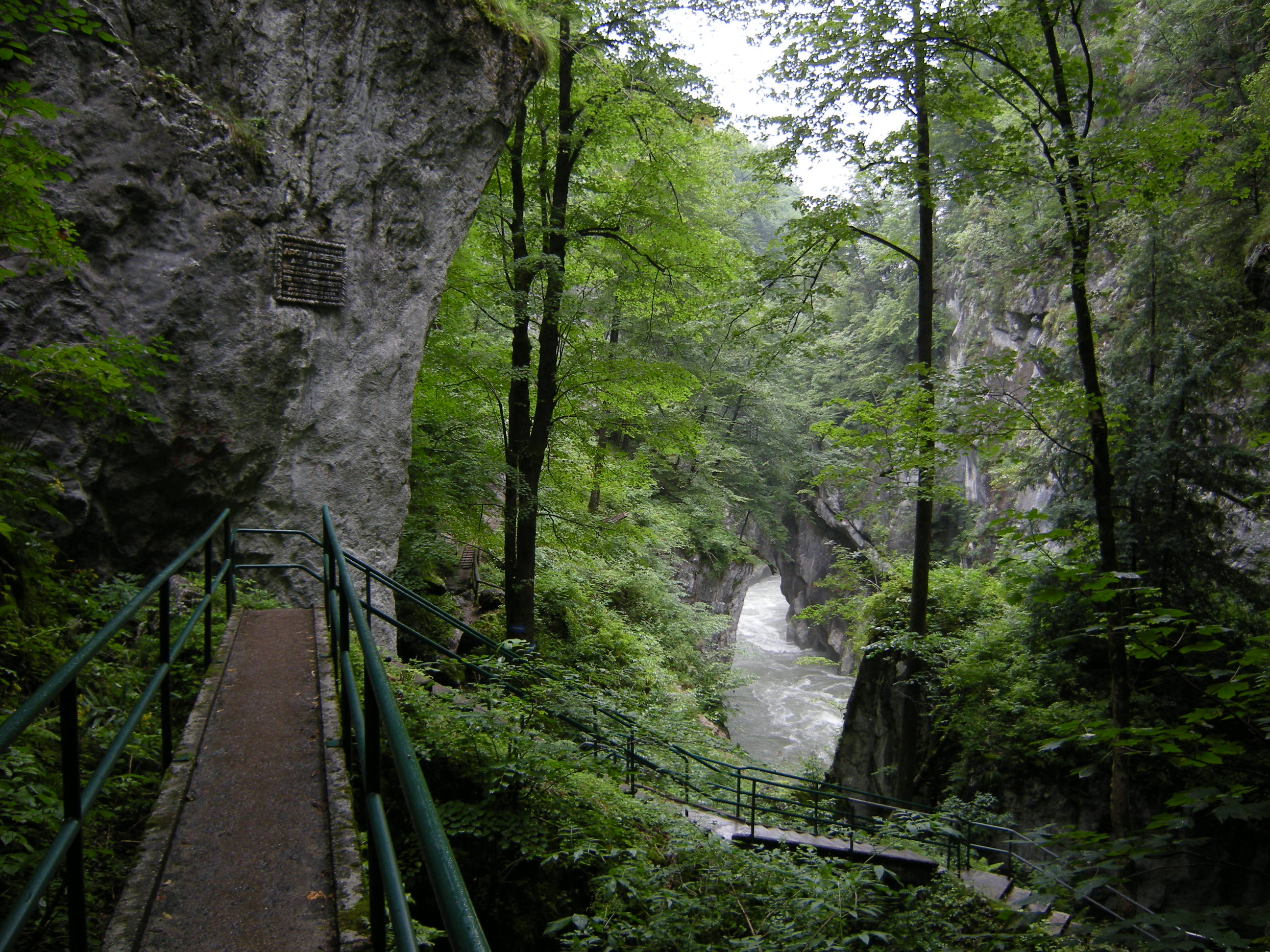
Pathway to the lower gorge

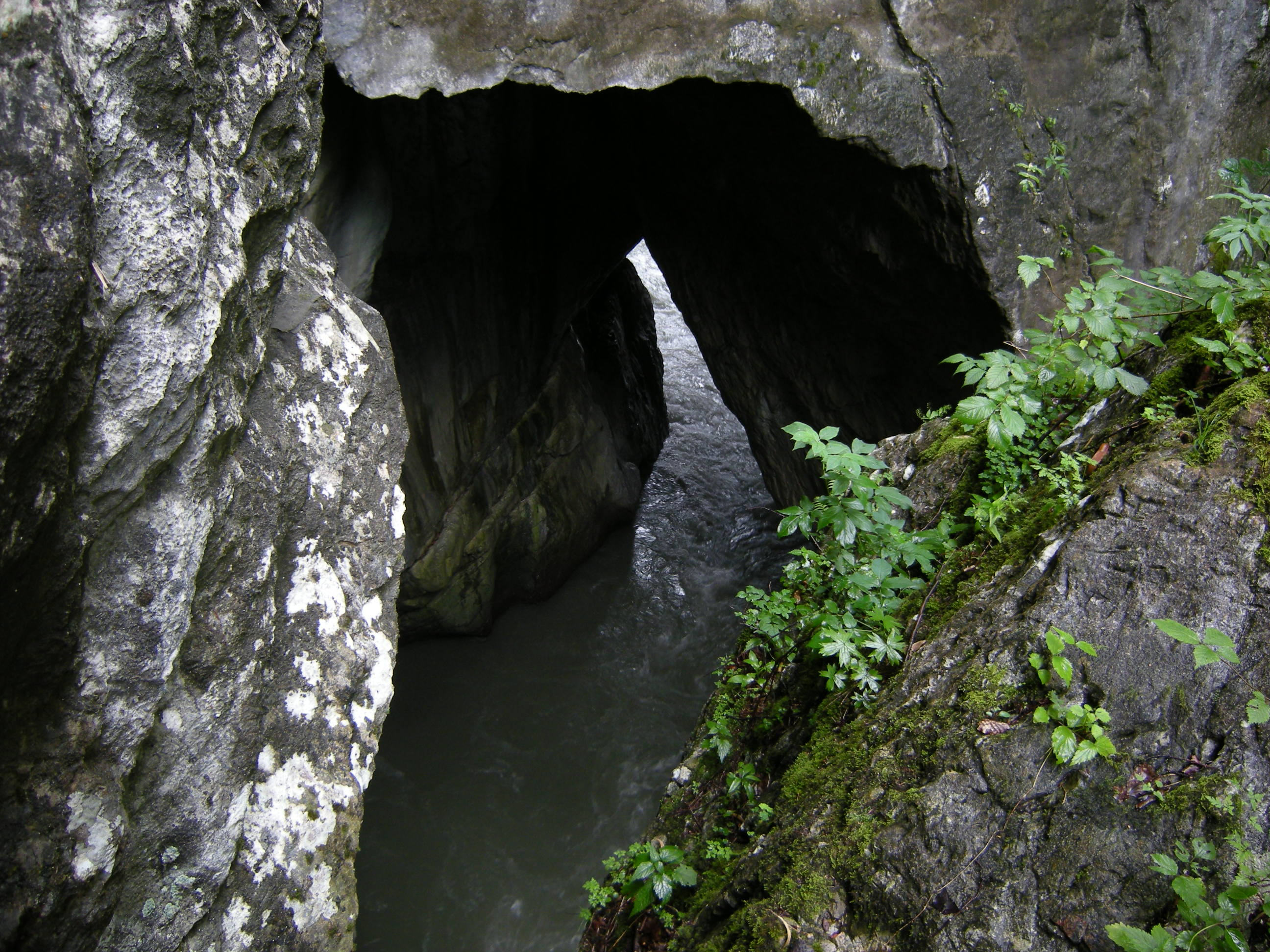
A limestone arch

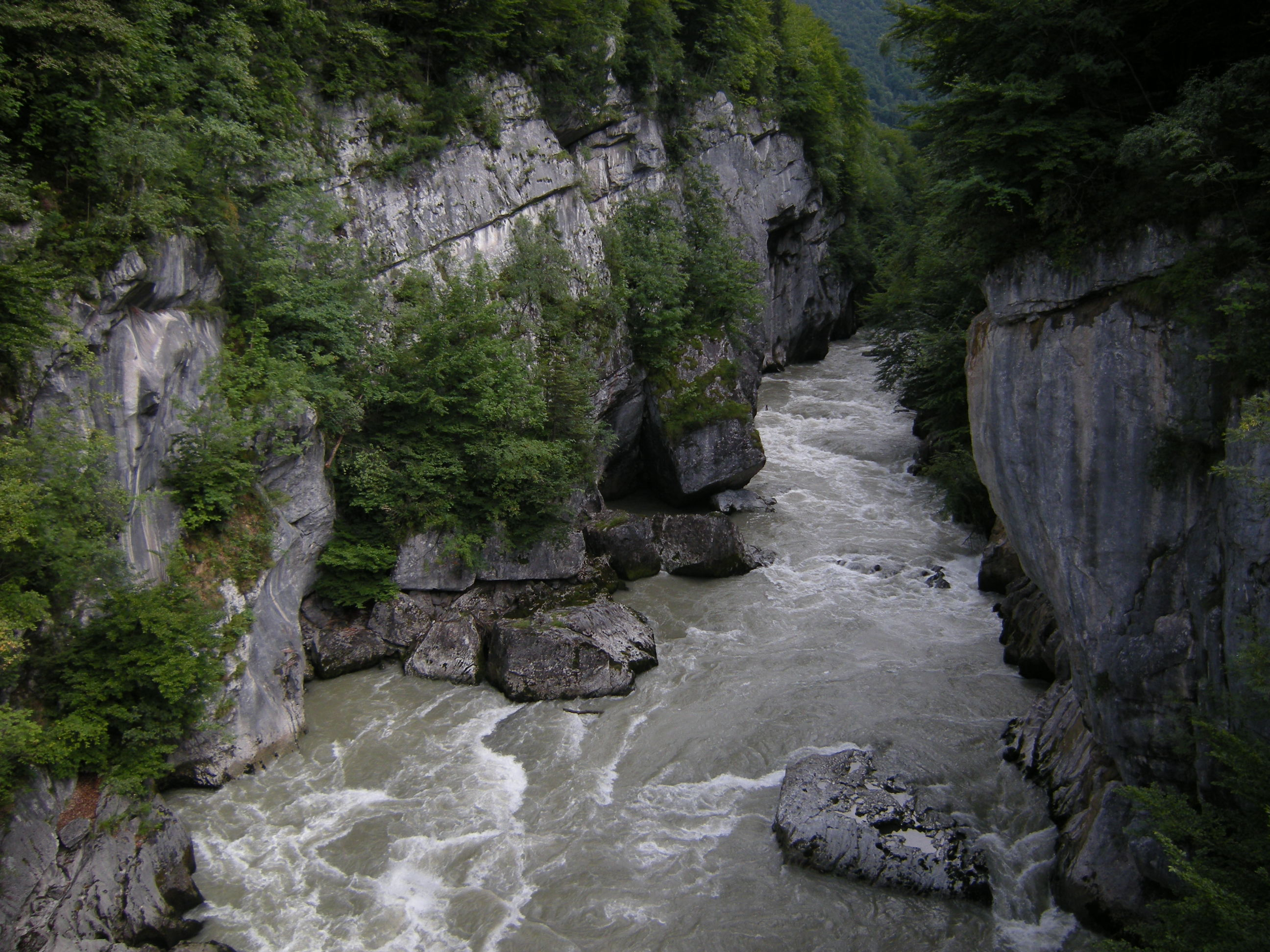
Above the lower gorge

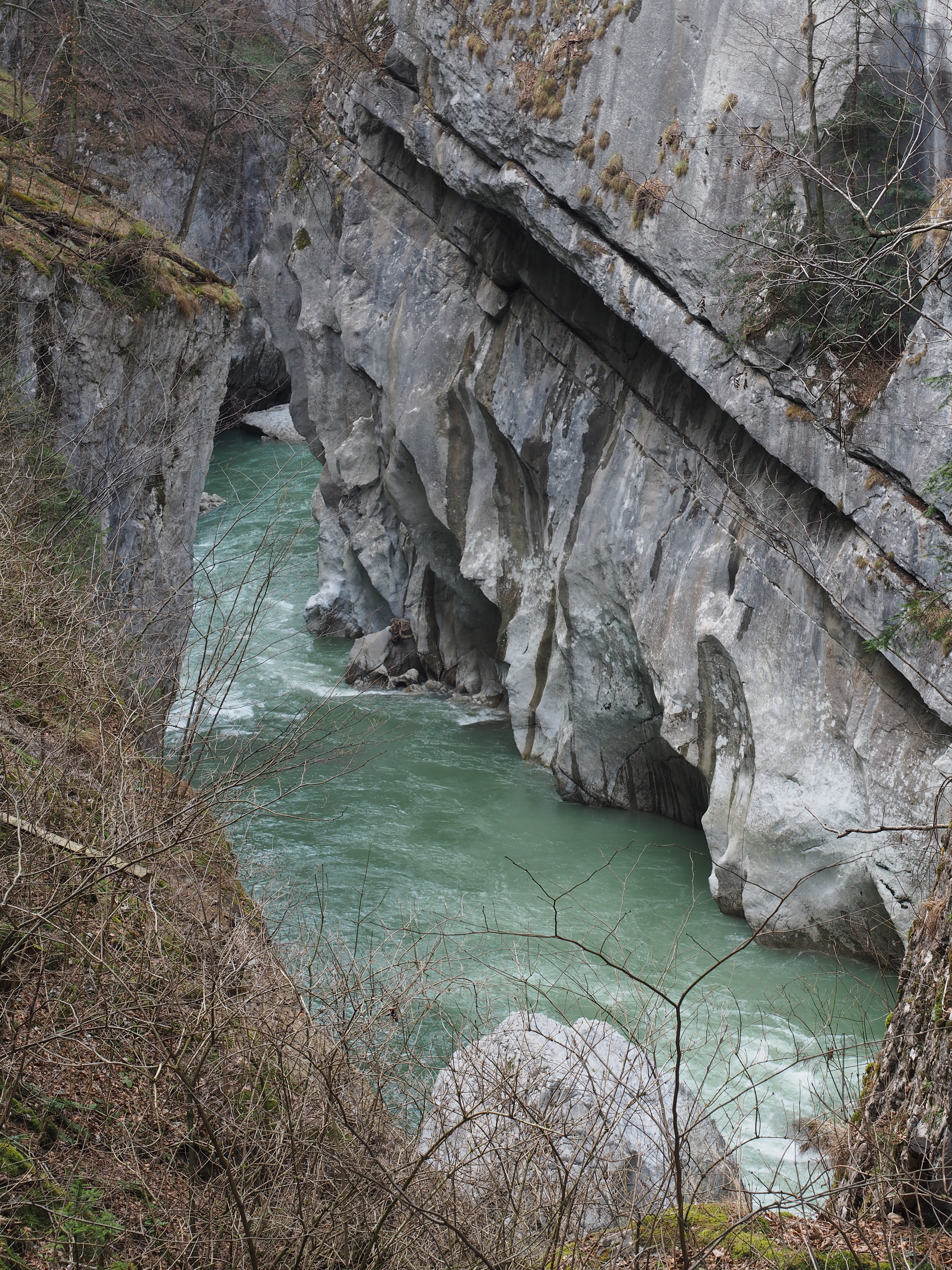
The Salzach flowing through the gorge
