= Annaberg-Lungötz =

- Municipality
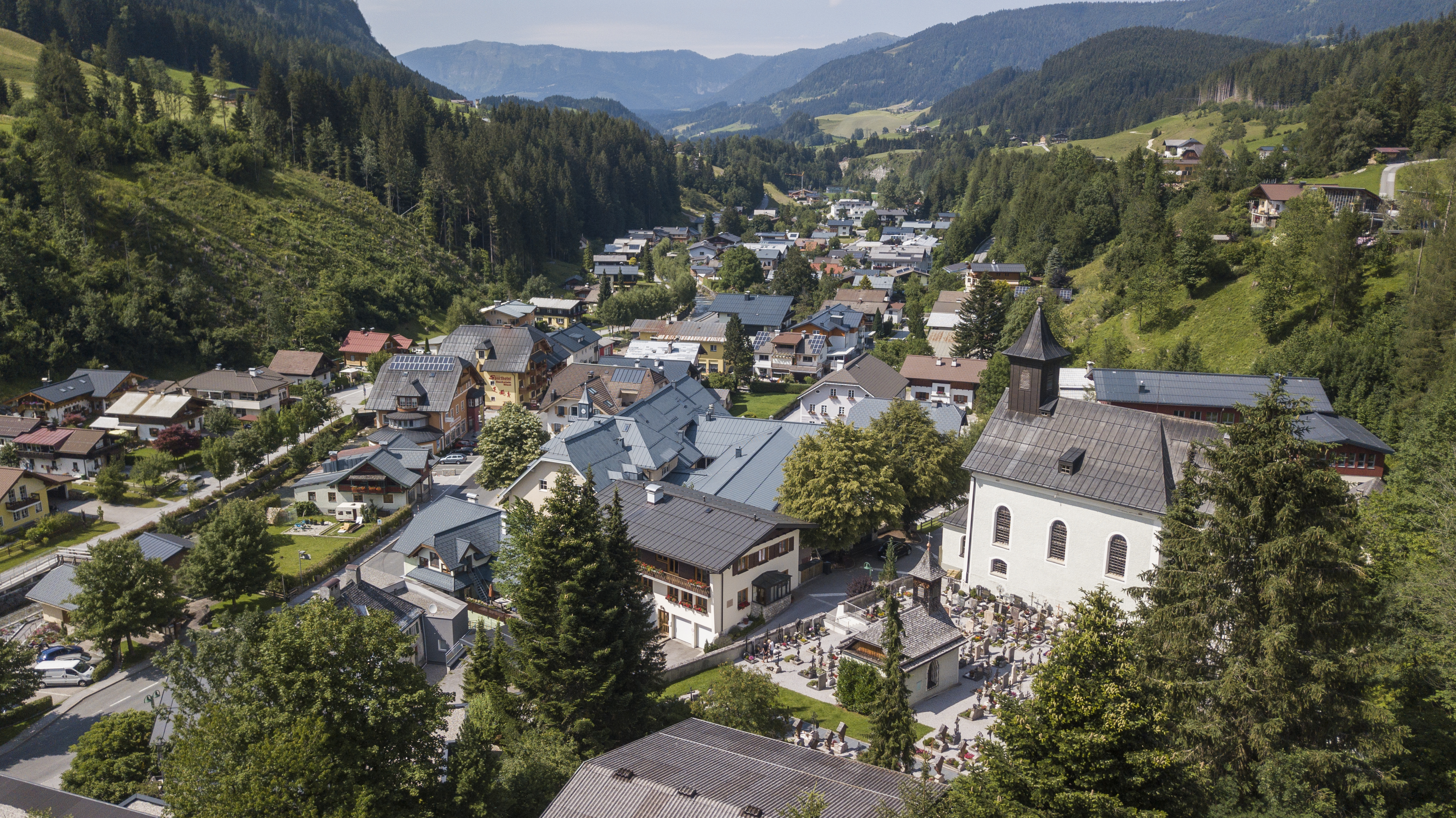

- Coat of arms

- Location within Austria
- Coordinates: 47°31′00″N 13°25′00″E
- Country: Austria
- State: Salzburg
- District: Hallein

Government
  - Mayor: Martin Promok (SPÖ)

Area
  - Total: 61.04 km^{2} (23.57 sq mi)
- Elevation: 777 m (2,549 ft)

Population (2018-01-01)
  - Total: 2,203
  - Density: 36.09/km^{2} (93.48/sq mi)
- Time zone: UTC+1 (CET)
  - Summer (DST): UTC+2 (CEST)
- Postal code: 5524 Annaberg, 5523 Lungötz
- Area code: 06463
- Vehicle registration: HA
- Website: www.annaberg-lungoetz.at

Annaberg-Lungötz is a municipality in the district of Hallein, in the Austrian state of Salzburg.

== Geography ==
The municipality lies in the Lammer River valley at the foot of the Gosaukamm.

== History ==
It belonged for centuries to the Pongau. Only in 1896, when Hallein became a district capital, did the municipality become part of the Tennengau.

== Tourism ==
One of its subdivisions, Annaberg im Lammertal, is a village notable for tourism. Located in the Alps, it is part of the Dachstein West ski region. Summer activities available to tourists include mountain biking, paragliding, white water rafting, and walking holidays etc.
