= Abtenau =

- Municipality
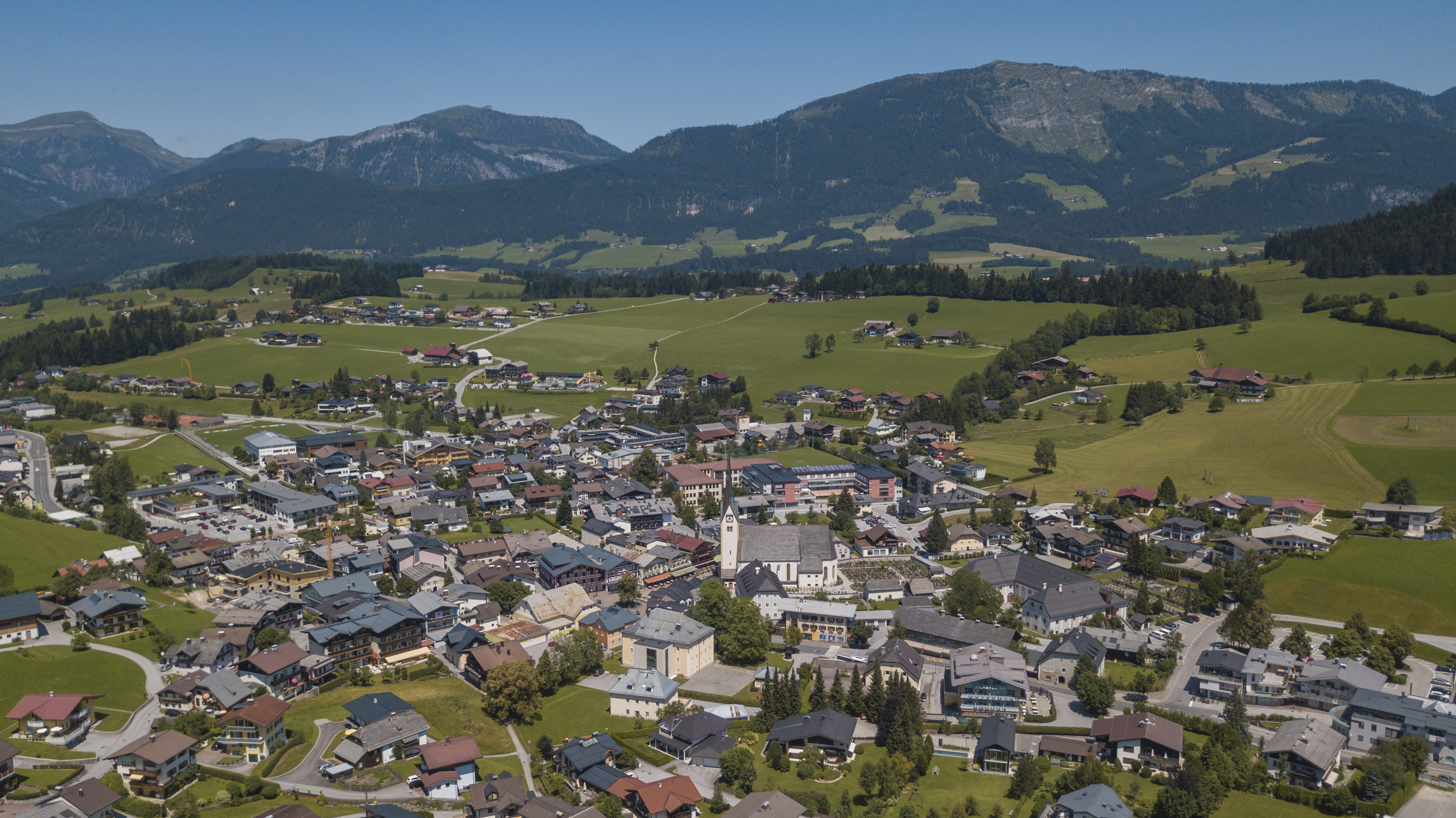

- Coat of arms

- Location within Austria
- Coordinates: 47°32′00″N 13°21′00″E
- Country: Austria
- State: Salzburg
- District: Hallein

Government
  - Mayor: Johann Schnitzhofer (ÖVP)

Area
  - Total: 186.95 km^{2} (72.18 sq mi)
- Elevation: 714 m (2,343 ft)

Population (2018-01-01)
  - Total: 5,842
  - Density: 31.25/km^{2} (80.93/sq mi)
- Time zone: UTC+1 (CET)
  - Summer (DST): UTC+2 (CEST)
- Postal code: 5441
- Area code: 06243
- Vehicle registration: HA
- Website: www.abtenau.at

Abtenau (Central Bavarian: Obtenau) is a market town in the Hallein District of Salzburg in Austria. The municipality is located in Lammertal, Tennengau, about 45 kilometres (28 mi) south of Salzburg and encompasses the entire middle valley of the Lammer.

== Geography ==
Abtenau lies in the Lammer river valley (Lammertal) about 45 kilometres (28 mi) south of Salzburg.

== Climate ==
Climate data for Abtenau (1971–2000)
| Month | Jan | Feb | Mar | Apr | May | Jun | Jul | Aug | Sep | Oct | Nov | Dec | Year |
|---|---|---|---|---|---|---|---|---|---|---|---|---|---|
| Record high °C (°F) | 14.1 (57.4) | 18.0 (64.4) | 24.0 (75.2) | 28.5 (83.3) | 30.4 (86.7) | 34.3 (93.7) | 36.8 (98.2) | 35.0 (95.0) | 31.5 (88.7) | 28.3 (82.9) | 23.6 (74.5) | 19.2 (66.6) | 36.8 (98.2) |
| Mean daily maximum °C (°F) | 2.0 (35.6) | 4.5 (40.1) | 8.6 (47.5) | 12.9 (55.2) | 18.8 (65.8) | 20.9 (69.6) | 23.2 (73.8) | 23.1 (73.6) | 19.3 (66.7) | 14.5 (58.1) | 6.5 (43.7) | 2.3 (36.1) | 13.1 (55.6) |
| Daily mean °C (°F) | −3.1 (26.4) | −1.5 (29.3) | 2.3 (36.1) | 6.4 (43.5) | 11.9 (53.4) | 14.6 (58.3) | 16.6 (61.9) | 16.3 (61.3) | 12.6 (54.7) | 7.9 (46.2) | 1.6 (34.9) | −2.2 (28.0) | 7.0 (44.6) |
| Mean daily minimum °C (°F) | −6.5 (20.3) | −5.4 (22.3) | −1.7 (28.9) | 1.7 (35.1) | 6.4 (43.5) | 9.5 (49.1) | 11.6 (52.9) | 11.4 (52.5) | 8.2 (46.8) | 3.9 (39.0) | −1.6 (29.1) | −5.3 (22.5) | 2.7 (36.9) |
| Record low °C (°F) | −26 (−15) | −20.5 (−4.9) | −24 (−11) | −8.7 (16.3) | −7 (19) | 0.4 (32.7) | 4.0 (39.2) | −0.9 (30.4) | −2 (28) | −8.6 (16.5) | −18.2 (−0.8) | −25.5 (−13.9) | −26 (−15) |
| Average precipitation mm (inches) | 104.3 (4.11) | 81.2 (3.20) | 112.1 (4.41) | 99.7 (3.93) | 121.6 (4.79) | 183.4 (7.22) | 216.2 (8.51) | 185.6 (7.31) | 133.5 (5.26) | 94.0 (3.70) | 107.7 (4.24) | 118.1 (4.65) | 1,557.4 (61.31) |
| Average snowfall cm (inches) | 68.2 (26.9) | 60.8 (23.9) | 62.0 (24.4) | 13.8 (5.4) | 0.1 (0.0) | 0.0 (0.0) | 0.0 (0.0) | 0.0 (0.0) | 0.0 (0.0) | 0.8 (0.3) | 35.6 (14.0) | 76.0 (29.9) | 317.3 (124.9) |
| Average precipitation days (≥ 1.0 mm) | 11.4 | 10.5 | 13.4 | 13.2 | 13.7 | 16.9 | 17.0 | 14.7 | 12.1 | 11.0 | 12.5 | 12.9 | 159.3 |
| Average relative humidity (%) (at 14:00) | 74.3 | 64.0 | 56.9 | 51.1 | 49.4 | 54.8 | 52.5 | 53.3 | 55.3 | 58.0 | 72.2 | 80.4 | 60.2 |
| Mean monthly sunshine hours | 62.9 | 92.9 | 143.1 | 142.6 | 186.9 | 167.6 | 192.4 | 188.9 | 159.3 | 141.0 | 65.7 | 56.1 | 1,599.4 |
| Percentage possible sunshine | 39.3 | 42.4 | 45.5 | 40.4 | 46.3 | 40.0 | 45.7 | 48.6 | 48.3 | 51.7 | 35.6 | 41.6 | 43.8 |
Source: Central Institute for Meteorology and Geodynamics

== Population ==
The municipal area comprises the following 23 villages (in brackets population as of 1 January 2019):

- Abtenau (1203)
- Au (544)
- Döllerhof (450)
- Erlfeld (163)
- Fischbach (419)
- Gseng (25)
- Hallseiten (47)
- Kehlhof (490)
- Leitenhaus (158)
- Lindenthal (510)
- Möselberg (102)
- Pichl (452)
- Rigaus (213)
- Salfelden (76)
- Schorn (284)
- Schratten (129)
- Seetratten (98)
- Seydegg (25)
- Stocker (133)
- Unterberg (45)
- Wagner (116)
- Waldhof (173)
- Wegscheid (54)

== Sister towns ==
- Big Bear Lake (California, United States)
- Münster (Hesse, Germany)
