= Bad Vigaun =

- Municipality
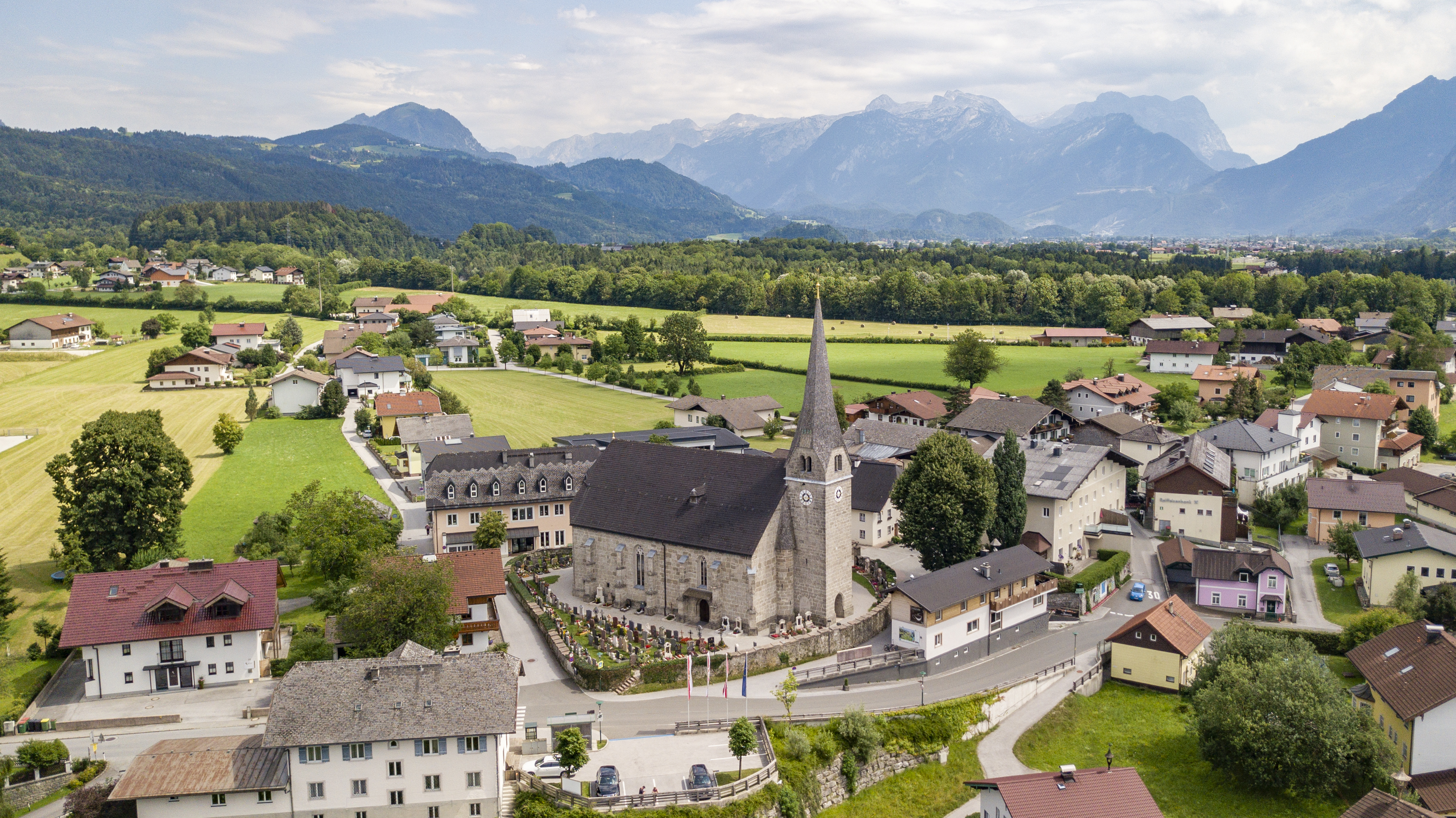
- Aerial view (2018)

- Coat of arms

- Location within Austria
- Coordinates: 47°40′N 13°08′E
- Country: Austria
- State: Salzburg
- District: Hallein

Government
  - Mayor: Friedrich Holztrattner (ÖVP)

Area
  - Total: 17.55 km^{2} (6.78 sq mi)
- Elevation: 484 m (1,588 ft)

Population (2018-01-01)
  - Total: 2,091
  - Density: 119.1/km^{2} (308.6/sq mi)
- Time zone: UTC+1 (CET)
  - Summer (DST): UTC+2 (CEST)
- Postal code: 5424
- Area code: 0662
- Vehicle registration: S
- Website: www.badvigaun.salzburg.at/

Bad Vigaun is a municipality and spa town in the district of Hallein, in the Austrian state of Salzburg.

== Geography ==
Bad Vigaun, formerly known simply as Vigaun, is located in the historic Tennengau region, about 15 km (9.3 mi) south of the state capital Salzburg. The municipal area stretches from the Hagen Mountains, the Tennen Mountains and the Untersberg massif in the west to the Osterhorn Group of the Salzkammergut Mountains in the east. It comprises the cadastral communities of Rengerberg and Vigaun.

The municipality has access to the Salzburg-Tyrol Railway line and the S-Bahn Salzburg network at Bad Vigaun station as well as to the Tauern Autobahn (A10) at the Hallein junction.

== History ==
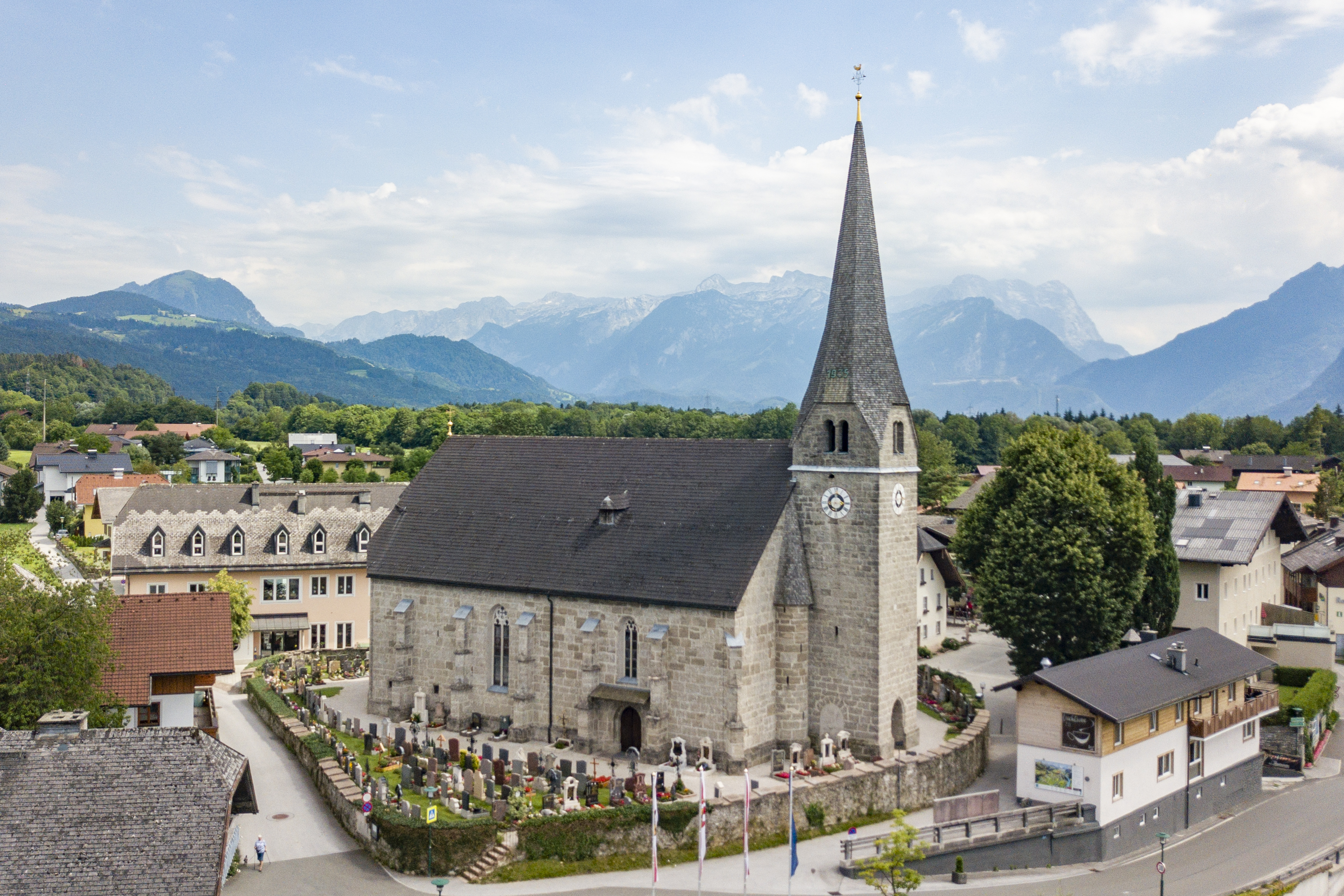
Parish church

The settlement of Vicone (Figun) was first mentioned in a 748 deed. Possibly derived from Latin: vicus, the place was already settled in Roman times, when the area was part of the Noricum province. The local parish was documented in land register issued by Bishop Arno of Salzburg in the late 8th century. The present-day Late Gothic church building, dedicated to Saint Dionysius, was erected from 1488 to 1516.

Hot springs in Vigaun were drilled in 1976. The municipality was awarded the official status of a spa town (Bad) by resolution of the Salzburg state government in 2002.
