= Puch bei Hallein =

Puch bei Hallein Buach
- Municipality
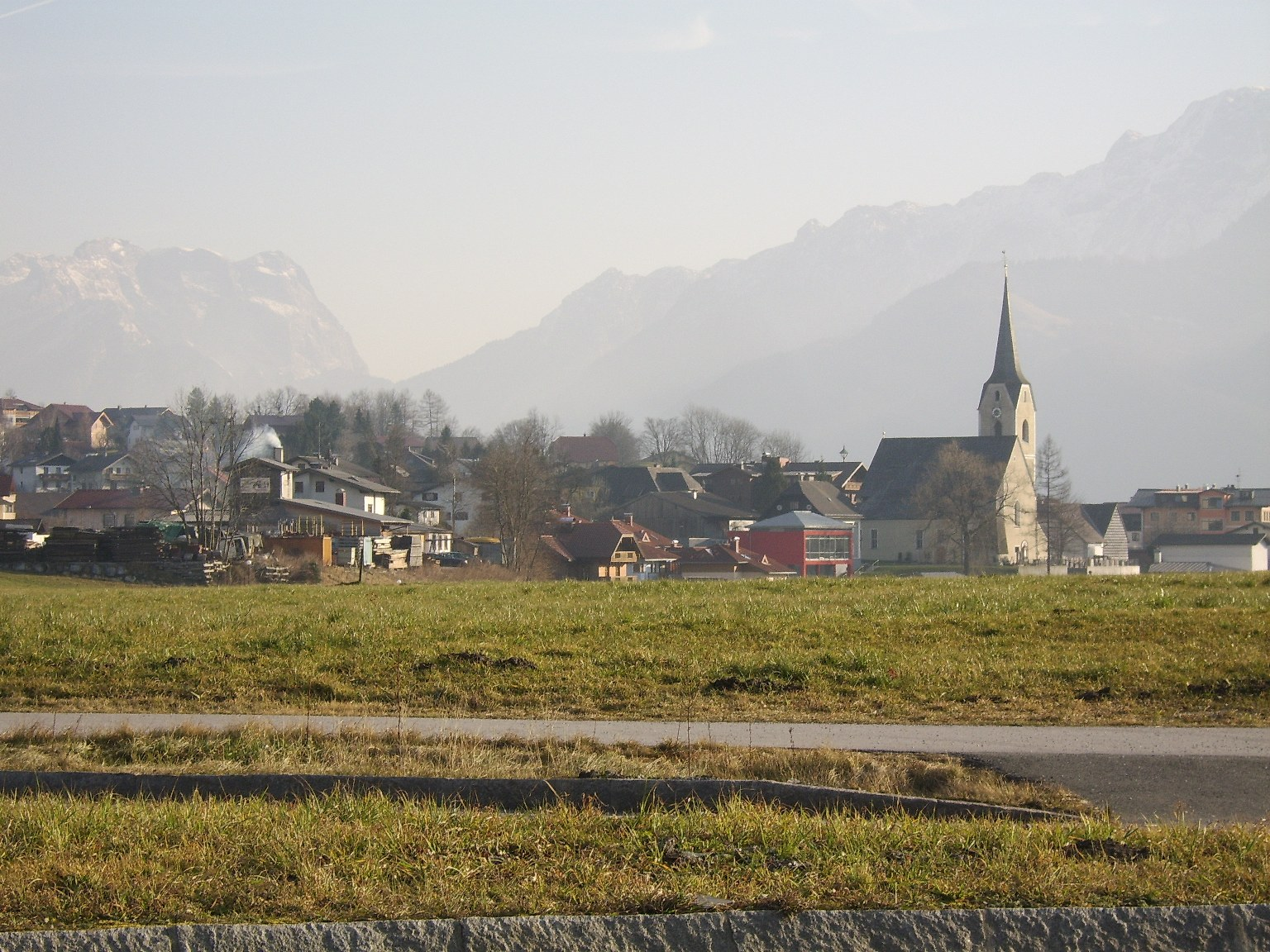

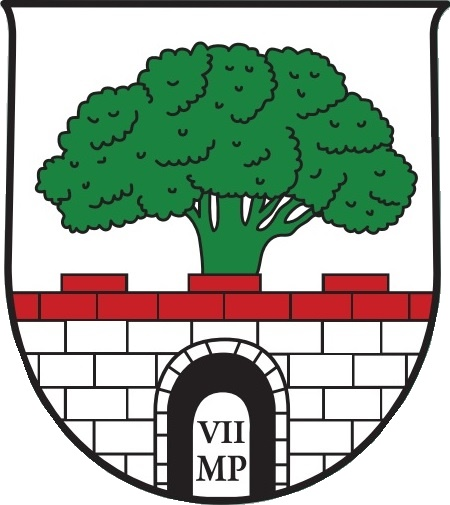
- Coat of arms

- Location within Austria
- Coordinates: 47°43′00″N 13°05′40″E
- Country: Austria
- State: Salzburg
- District: Hallein

Government
  - Mayor: Barbara Schweitl (SPÖ)

Area
  - Total: 21.01 km^{2} (8.11 sq mi)
- Elevation: 444 m (1,457 ft)

Population (2018-01-01)
  - Total: 4,675
  - Density: 222.5/km^{2} (576.3/sq mi)
- Time zone: UTC+1 (CET)
  - Summer (DST): UTC+2 (CEST)
- Postal code: 5412
- Area code: 06245
- Vehicle registration: HA
- Website: www.puch.salzburg.at

Puch bei Hallein (Central Bavarian: Buach) is a municipality in the Hallein District (Tennengau) of the Austrian state of Salzburg.

== Transportation ==
It can be reached by suburban S-Bahn railway from the state capital Salzburg and also has access to the A 10 Tauern Autobahn (European route E55) from Salzburg to Villach.

== History ==
The settlement was first mentioned as Puoche in a 930 deed, while the Puchstein Castle was already documented in 822. Main sight is the Baroque Urstein Palace, erected in 1691, now seat of a private academy. Puch is also a location of the Salzburg Fachhochschule (University of Applied Sciences).
