= Rußbach am Paß Gschütt =

- Municipality
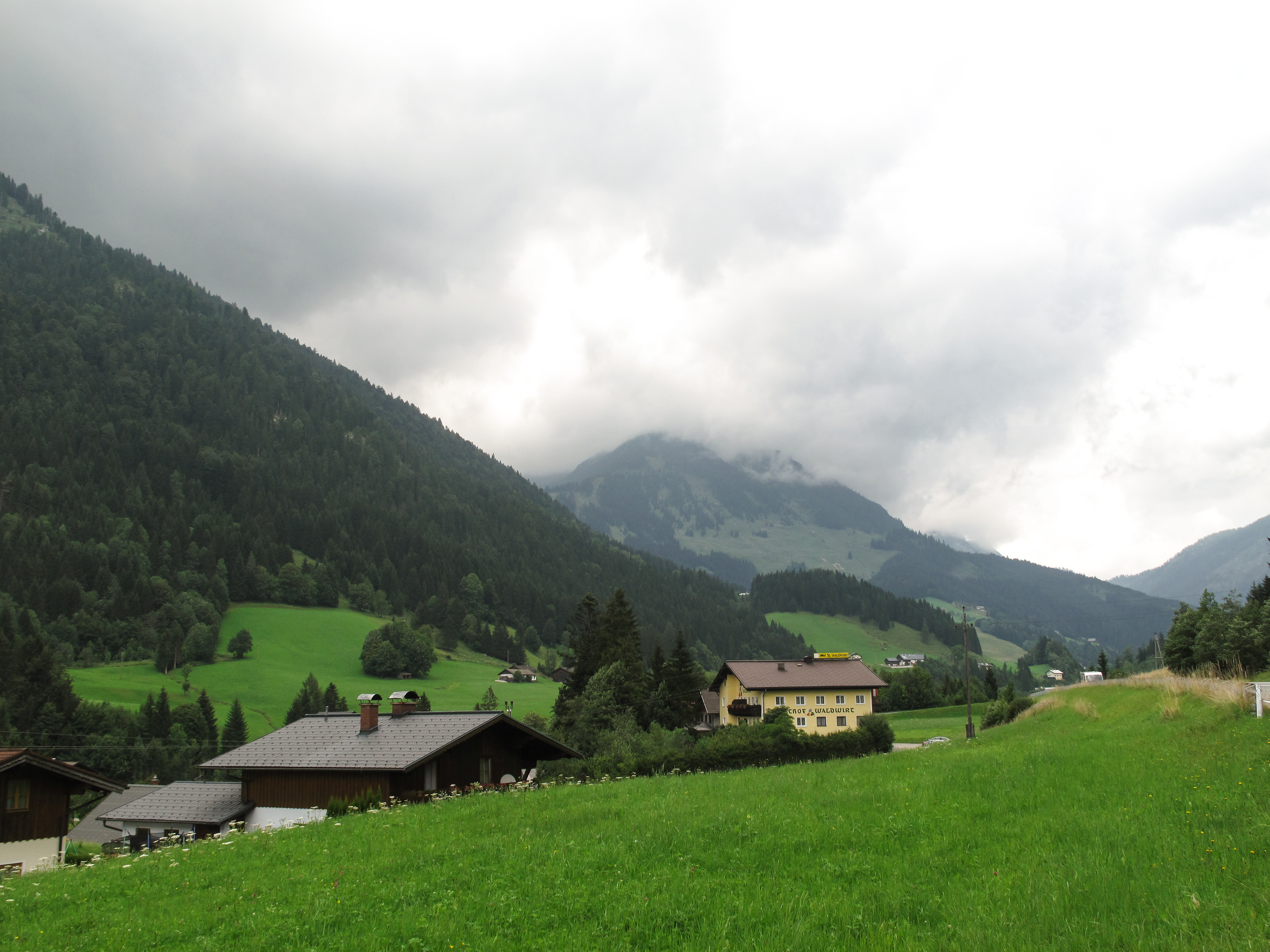

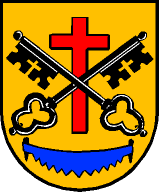
- Coat of arms

- Location within Austria
- Coordinates: 47°35′30″N 13°28′00″E
- Country: Austria
- State: Salzburg
- District: Hallein

Government
  - Mayor: Karl Huemer (ÖVP)

Area
  - Total: 34.02 km^{2} (13.14 sq mi)
- Elevation: 813 m (2,667 ft)

Population (2018-01-01)
  - Total: 767
  - Density: 22.5/km^{2} (58.4/sq mi)
- Time zone: UTC+1 (CET)
  - Summer (DST): UTC+2 (CEST)
- Postal code: 5442
- Area code: 06242
- Vehicle registration: HA
- Website: www.russbach.salzburg.at

Rußbach am Paß Gschütt is a municipality in the Hallein district in the Austrian state of Salzburg.

== Geography ==
The municipality lies in the Rußbach valley, a tributary of the Lammer River in the Tennengau.
