= Krispl =

Municipality in Salzburg, Austria

- Municipality
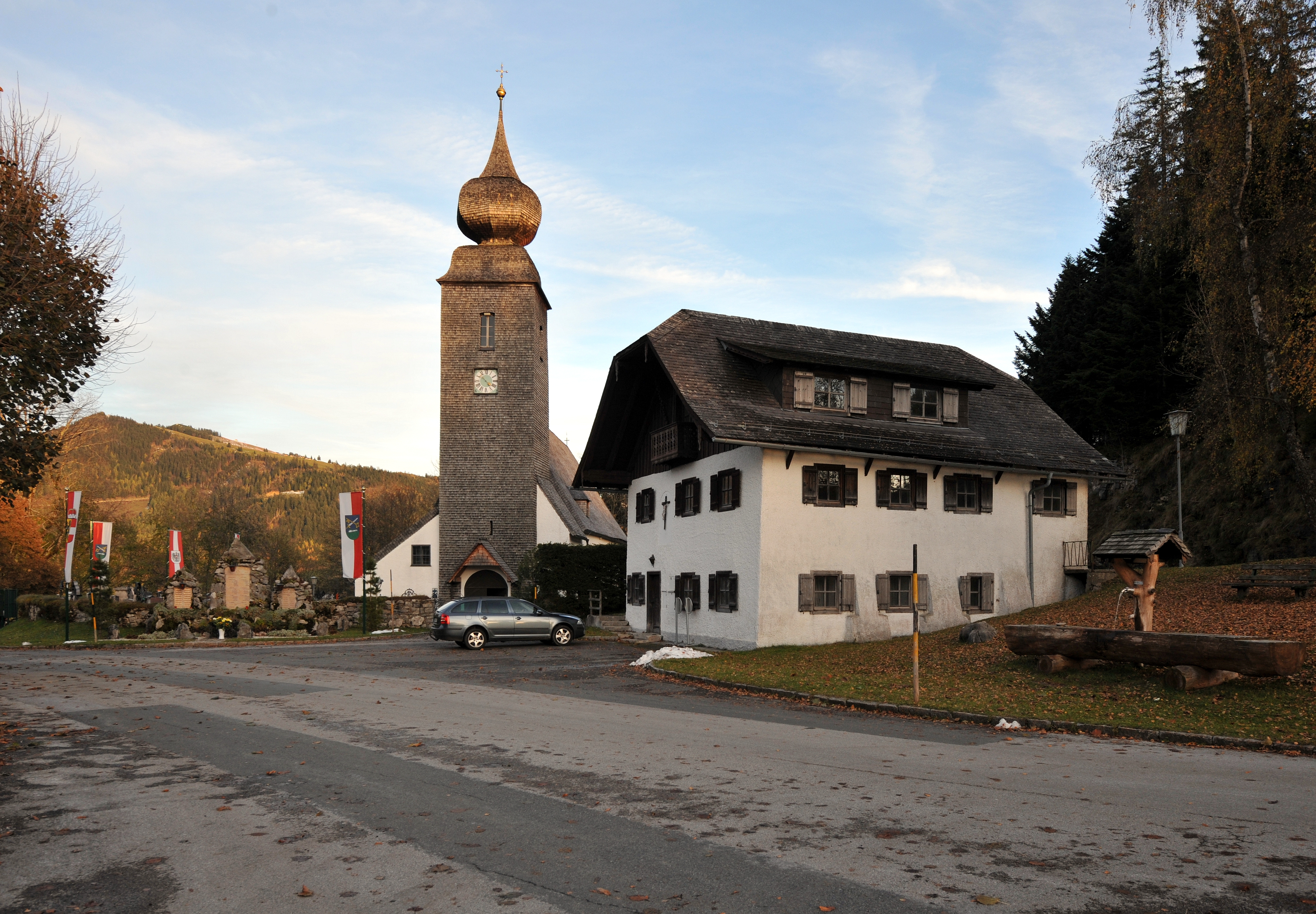
- Krispl parish church

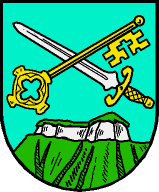
- Coat of arms

- Location within Austria
- Coordinates: 47°43′00″N 13°10′00″E
- Country: Austria
- State: Salzburg
- District: Hallein

Government
  - Mayor: Andreas Ploner (ÖVP)

Area
  - Total: 29.66 km^{2} (11.45 sq mi)
- Elevation: 703 m (2,306 ft)

Population (2018-01-01)
  - Total: 889
  - Density: 30.0/km^{2} (77.6/sq mi)
- Time zone: UTC+1 (CET)
  - Summer (DST): UTC+2 (CEST)
- Postal code: 5421
- Area code: 06240
- Vehicle registration: HA
- Website: www.krispl.salzburg.at

Krispl is a municipality in the Hallein district in the Austrian state of Salzburg.
