= Adnet =

Town in Salzburg, Austria

- Municipality
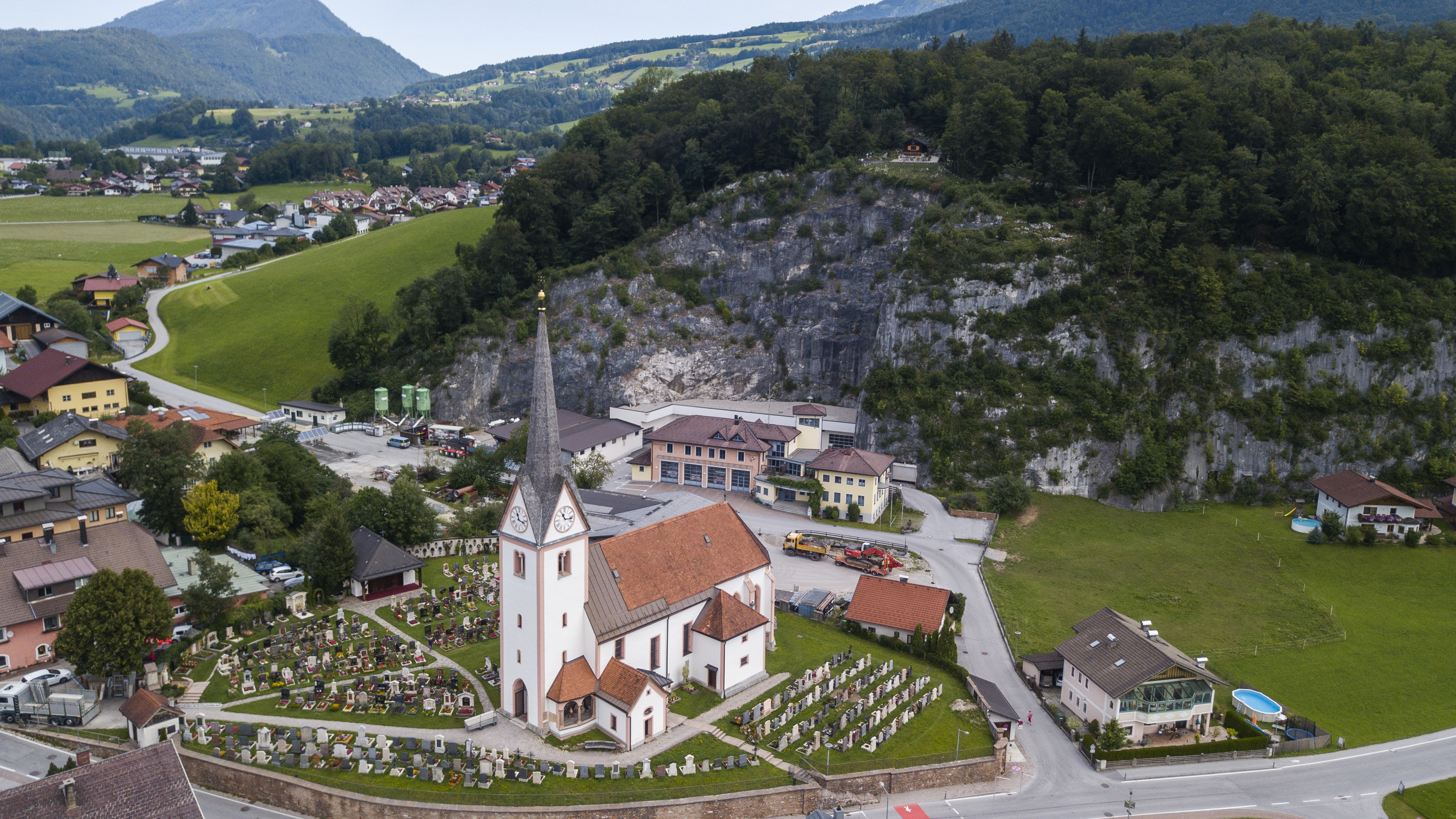
- Adnet

- Coat of arms

- Location within Austria
- Coordinates: 47°41′48″N 13°07′49″E
- Country: Austria
- State: Salzburg
- District: Hallein

Government
  - Mayor: Wolfgang Auer (ÖVP)

Area
  - Total: 30 km^{2} (12 sq mi)
- Elevation: 484 m (1,588 ft)

Population (2018-01-01)
  - Total: 3,557
  - Density: 120/km^{2} (310/sq mi)
- Time zone: UTC+1 (CET)
  - Summer (DST): UTC+2 (CEST)
- Postal code: 5421
- Area code: 06245
- Vehicle registration: HA
- Website: www.adnet.salzburg.at

Adnet is a town in the district of Hallein, in the Austrian state of Salzburg. It is famous for its marble, and there is a marble museum in the middle of the town.

== Geography ==
Adnet is situated near Hallein in the metropolitan area of Salzburg. Urban districts are: Adnet, Riedl, Spumberg, Waidach, Wimberg. The highest point is just beneath the Jägernase (a mountain slope of the local mountain Schlenken) about 1,501 metres (4,925 ft) above sea level.

== Coat of arms ==
The coat of arms of the municipality: on a golden shield between three red-marmoreal round stones is a black lion, in the right hand it is holding a black stonemason's hammer on its red shaft.

== Name Origin ==
The name originates from the Celtic (Atanate, Atanat, Attnat). It means swamp (situated by the water).

== Twinning ==
Adnet is twinned with:

- Oppenheim, Germany
