= Golling an der Salzach =

- Municipality
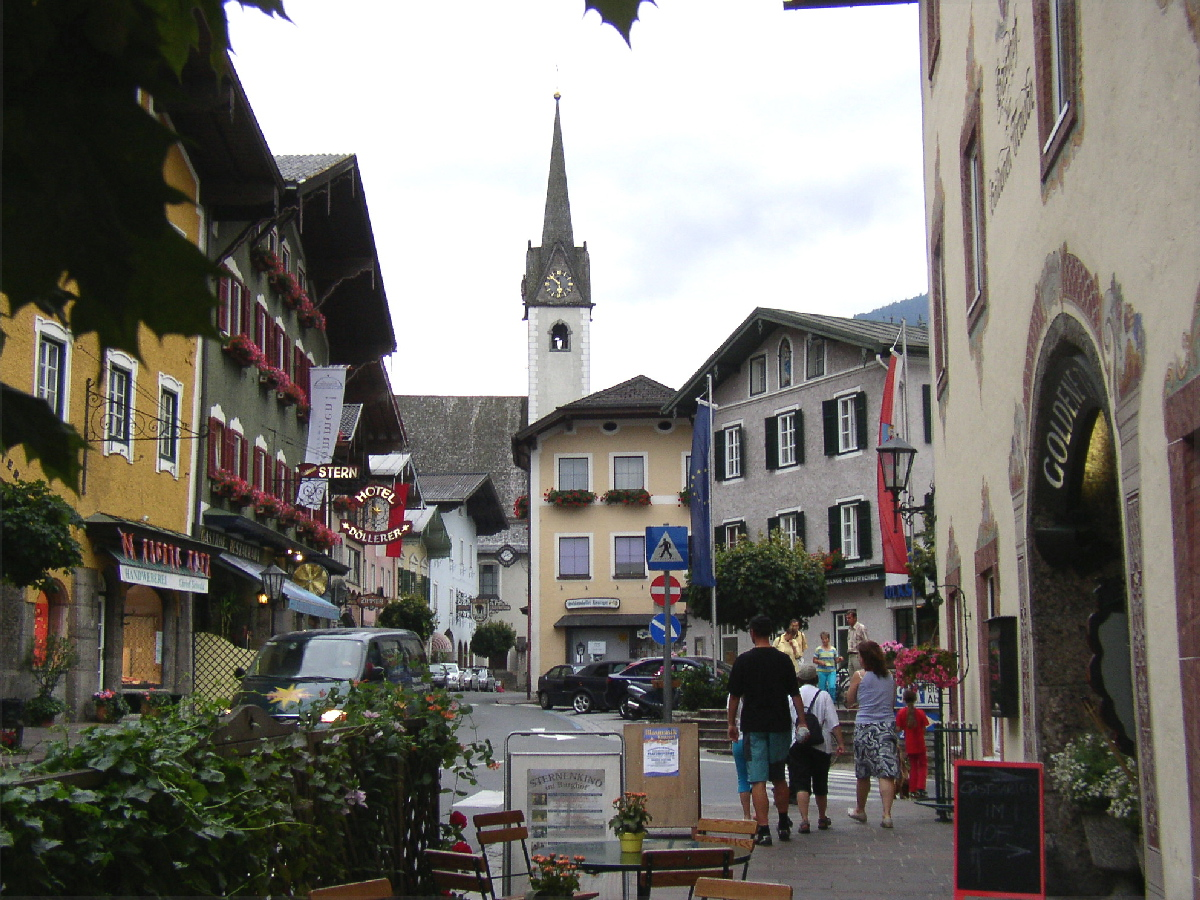
- Town centre

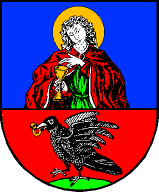
- Coat of arms

- Location within Austria
- Coordinates: 47°36′00″N 13°10′00″E
- Country: Austria
- State: Salzburg
- District: Hallein

Government
  - Mayor: Anton Kaufmann (ÖVP)

Area
  - Total: 82.2 km^{2} (31.7 sq mi)
- Elevation: 476 m (1,562 ft)

Population (2018-01-01)
  - Total: 4,271
  - Density: 52.0/km^{2} (135/sq mi)
- Time zone: UTC+1 (CET)
  - Summer (DST): UTC+2 (CEST)
- Postal code: 5440
- Area code: 0 62 44
- Vehicle registration: HA
- Website: www.golling.salzburg.at

Golling an der Salzach is a market town in the Hallein district of Salzburg, Austria.

== Geography ==
It is located on the southern rim of the Tennengau region south of the city of Salzburg. Here at the confluence of the Salzach and its Lammer tributary, the river leaves the Salzachöfen Gorge between the Berchtesgaden Alps and the Tennen Mountains ranges of the Northern Limestone Alps and flows northwards into the broad Salzburg basin. The Hoher Göll massif of the Berchtesgaden Alps in the west comprise the Schwarzbachfall Cave and the 76 m (249 ft) high Golling Waterfall, a natural monument.

Parallel to the Salzach River, the historic Salzachtal Straße enters the narrow gorge at Lueg Pass. Golling station is a stop on the Salzburg-Tyrol Railway, served by ÖBB trains and the Salzburg suburban S-Bahn network. The market town also has access to the Tauern Autobahn (A10) from Salzburg to Villach.

The municipal area comprises the cadastral communities of Golling, Torren, and Obergäu. Golling proper is colloquially just called Markt ("market").

== History ==
The area on the road to the copper mines in the Pongau region in the south had been settled at least since the Bronze Age. Here a Roman road led from the city of Iuvavum (Salzburg) across the Eastern Alps to Aquileia in Italy.

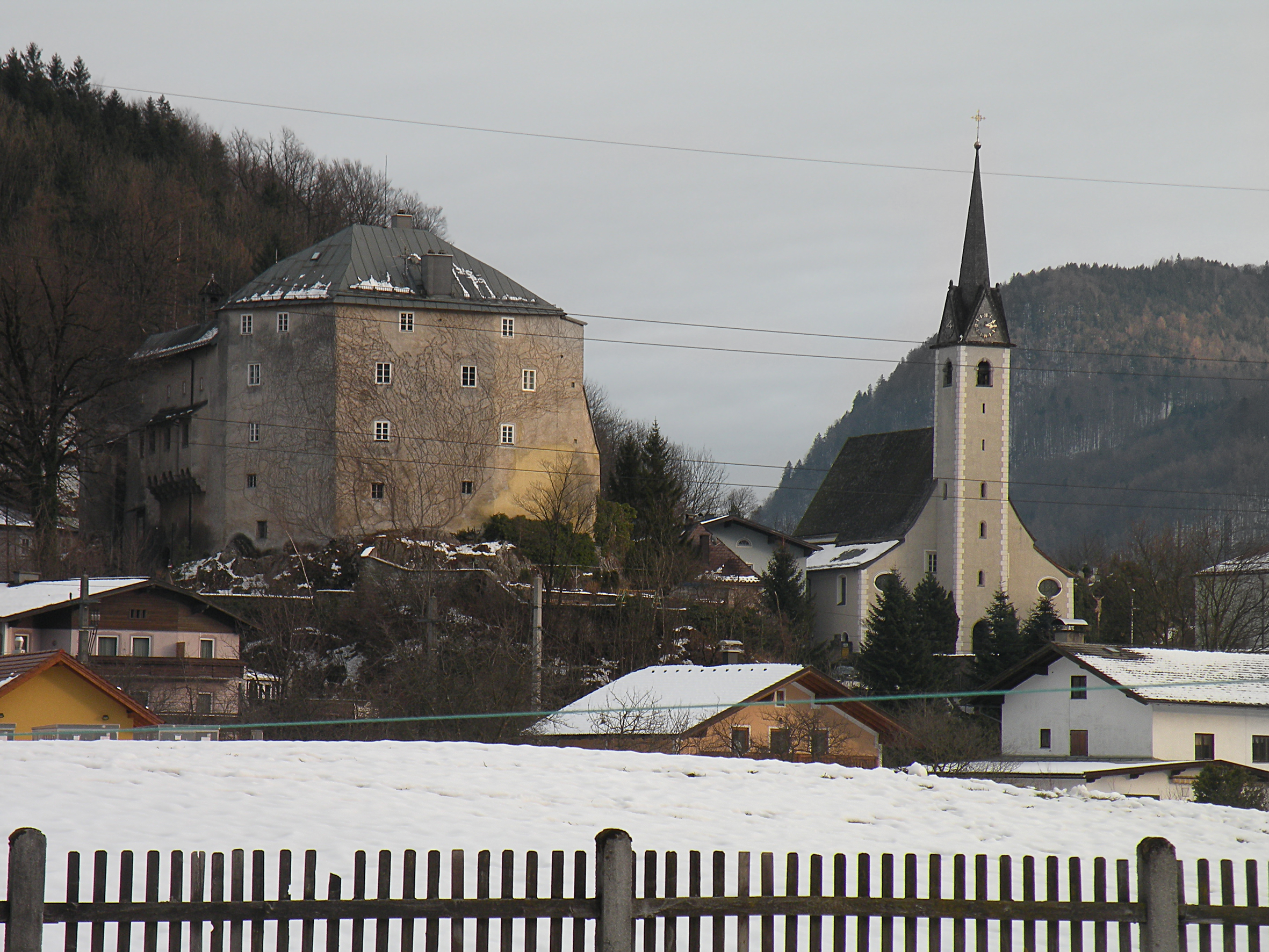
Castle and parish church

Formerly held by the Bavarian counts of Plain, Golingen first appeared in a 1241 deed. It was the site of Golling Castle erected at the behest of the Salzburg Archbishop Eberhard II on a hill above the town. It served as seat of the local administration and to control the trade route passing the narrow Salzach Valley between Golling and Hohenwerfen Castle. The name is probably derived from Slavic golica ("bald mountain"). A market beneath the castle was already mentioned in 1284, market rights were officially granted about 1390. Golling was heavily devastated by the insurgents of the German Peasants' War in 1526.

The Pass Lueg ravine south of the town was further fortified by the Salzburg prince-archbishops during the Thirty Years' War. In September 1809, it was the site of heavy fighting, when Salzburg rebels made a stand against united Franco-Bavarian occupation forces during the War of the Fifth Coalition. They could however not prevent the annexation by the Kingdom of Bavaria according to the Treaty of Schönbrunn. With Salzburg, Golling finally passed to the Austrian Empire in 1816 by resolution of the Vienna Congress.

== Politics ==
Seats in the municipal assembly (Gemeinderat) as of 2009 elections:

- Austrian People's Party (ÖVP): 13
- Social Democratic Party of Austria (SPÖ): 5
- Freedom Party of Austria (FPÖ): 3

== Notable people ==
- Joseph Mohr (1792–1848), who wrote the words to the Silent Night Christmas carol, served as priest of the Golling parish church from 1820 to 1821.
