= Hallein District =

Coordinates: 47.650°N 13.167°E

Hallein District Bezirk Hallein
- District
- Country: Austria
- State: Salzburg
- Number of municipalities: 13
- Administrative seat: Hallein

Government
  - District Governor: Monika Vogl

Area
  - Total: 668.35 km^{2} (258.05 sq mi)

Population (2023)
  - Total: 61,660
  - Density: 92.26/km^{2} (238.9/sq mi)
- Time zone: UTC+01:00 (CET)
  - Summer (DST): UTC+02:00 (CEST)
- Vehicle registration: HA

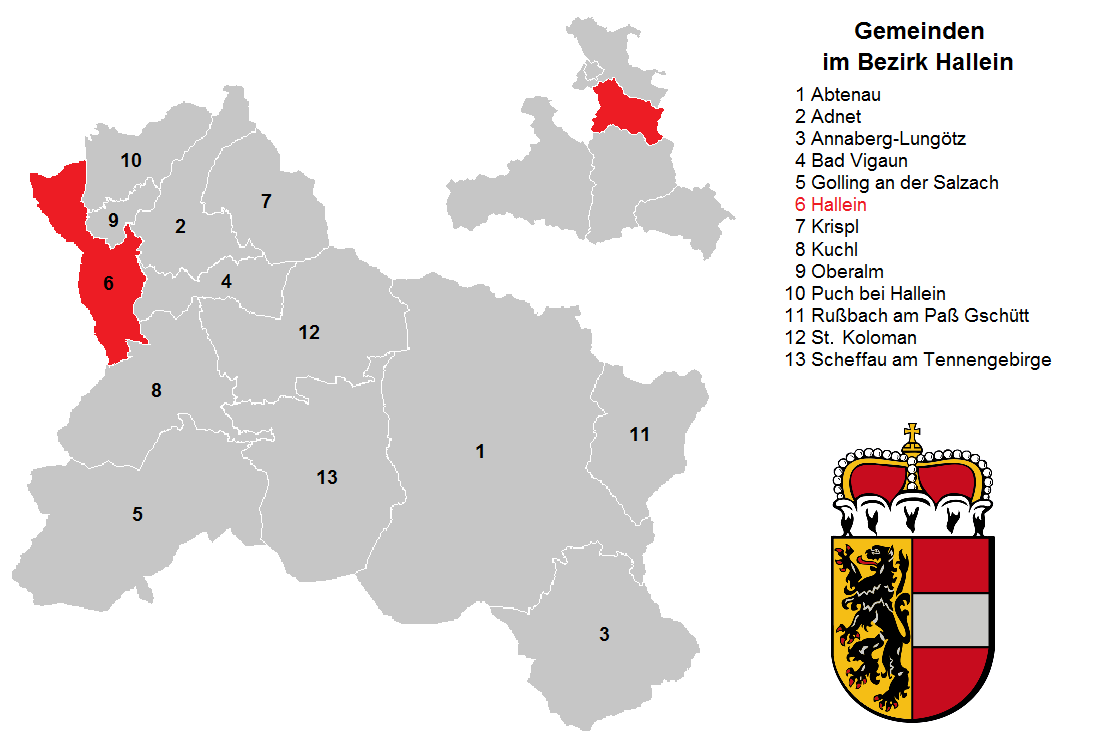
District map divided per municipalities (click to enlarge)

Historical population
Year	Pop.	±%
1869	18,674	—
1880	19,219	+2.9%
1890	19,983	+4.0%
1900	22,398	+12.1%
1910	24,600	+9.8%
1923	24,627	+0.1%
1934	26,988	+9.6%
1939	27,094	+0.4%
1951	34,263	+26.5%
1961	35,637	+4.0%
1971	41,115	+15.4%
1981	44,815	+9.0%
1991	50,396	+12.5%
2001	54,282	+7.7%
2011	57,346	+5.6%
2021	60,992	+6.4%
Source: Statistik Austria

The Bezirk Hallein is an administrative district (Bezirk) in the federal state of Salzburg, Austria, and congruent with the Tennengau region.

Area of the district is 668.35 km^{2}, with a population of 61,660 (Jan. 1, 2023), and population density 92 persons per km^{2}. Administrative center of the district is Hallein.

== Administrative divisions ==
The district is divided into 13 municipalities, one of them is a town, and four of them are market towns.

=== Towns ===
1. Hallein (21,523)

=== Market towns ===
1. Abtenau (6,003)
2. Golling an der Salzach (4,397)
3. Kuchl (7,475)
4. Oberalm (4,381)

=== Municipalities ===
1. Adnet (3,680)
2. Annaberg-Lungötz (2,209)
3. Bad Vigaun (2,149)
4. Krispl (873)
5. Puch bei Hallein (4,965)
6. Rußbach am Paß Gschütt (803)
7. St. Koloman (1,801)
8. Scheffau am Tennengebirge (1,421)

(population numbers Jan. 1, 2023)
