= Gschütt Pass =

Mountain pass in the Austrian Alps

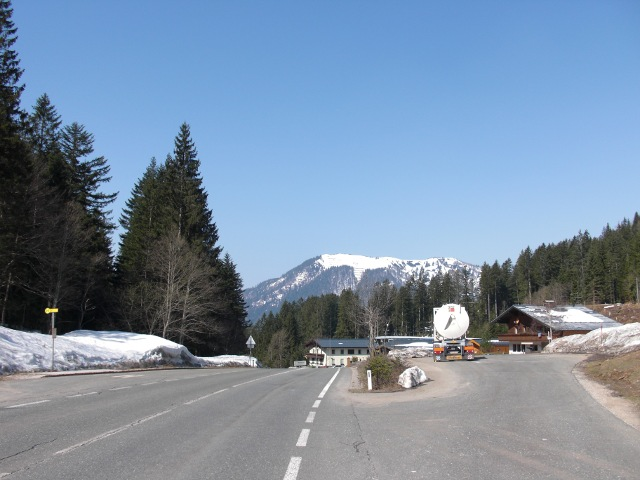
- Summit of the pass

- Location within Alps
- Elevation: 957 metres (3,140 ft)
- Traversed by: Federal Highway B 166

Third Approach
- Location: Austria
- Range: Alps
- Coordinates: 47°35′27″N 13°30′46″E

Gschütt Pass (elevation 957 metres [3,140 ft]) is a high mountain pass in the Austrian Alps between the Bundesländer of Salzburg and Upper Austria.

It connects Rußbach in the state of Salzburg with Gosau in Upper Austria. The pass is traversed by the Federal Highway B166.

== See also ==
- List of highest paved roads in Europe
- List of mountain passes
