= Lammer =

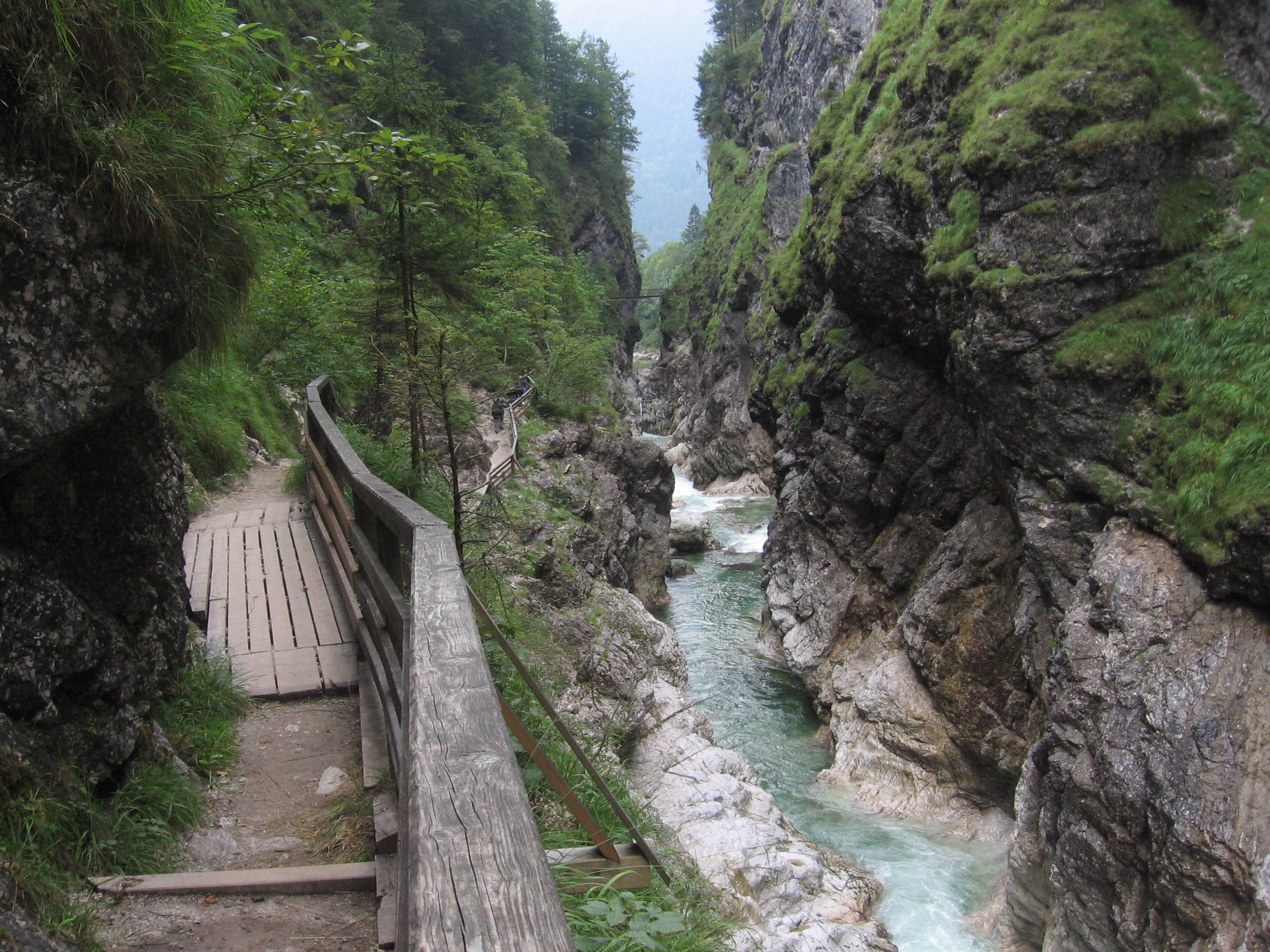
- Lammeröfen

Location
- Country: Austria
- State: Salzburg

Physical characteristics
- Source
  - location: Southern Tennen Mountains
  - elevation: 1,700 m (5,600 ft)
- Mouth
  - location: Near Golling into the Salzach
  - coordinates: 47°34′59″N 13°10′06″E
  - elevation: 480 m (1,570 ft)
- Length: 41 km (25 mi)

Basin features
- Progression: Salzach→ Inn→ Danube→ Black Sea

The Lammer is a river of Salzburg, Austria, a right tributary of the Salzach.

The Lammer rises in the Tennen Mountains and flows from east to west, joining with the Salzach at Golling an der Salzach. Its length is about 41 kilometres (25 mi). The river is known for its very clean water and is very popular for wild water sportsmen. Within the box canyon, the river has class IV-IV+ whitewater rapids.

== Etymology ==
The name was first mentioned in 1124 as Lamara. It means something like "river that flows through the gorge".
