= Dürrnberg =

- Village
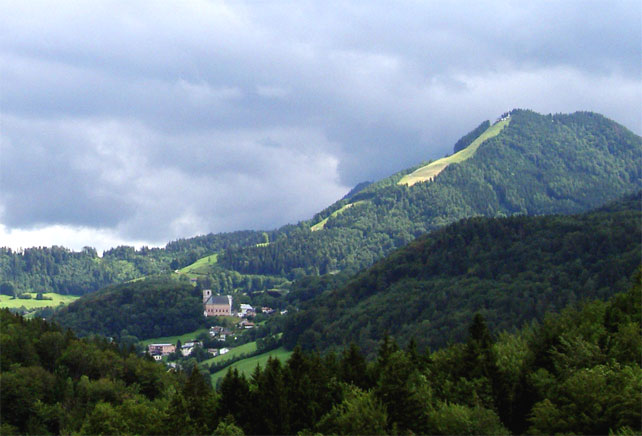
- Dürrnberg seen from the Barmsteine

- Location within Austria
- Coordinates: 47°39′58″N 13°5′24″E
- Country: Austria
- State: Salzburg
- District: Hallein
- Municipality: Hallein
- Elevation: 650 m (2,130 ft)

Population (2005)
  - Total: 746
- Time zone: UTC+1 (CET)
  - Summer (DST): UTC+2 (CEST)
- Postal code: 5422
- Area code: (+43) 06245
- Licence plate: HA

Dürrnberg, also named Bad Dürrnberg, is an Austrian village that is part of the municipality of Hallein, in Hallein District (Tennengau), Salzburg State. It is the location of the Hallein Salt Mine (Salzbergwerk Dürrnberg).

== History ==
The history of Dürrnberg and its territory is closely related to the presence of salt in its mountains. Previously used as a hunting ground for nomadic groups about 2000–2500 years BC, it was settled by Celtic tribes around 600 BC. For the important Celtic bronze flagon found there, now in the Keltenmuseum in Hallein, see Basse Yutz Flagons.

== Geography ==
The village is located on a hillside above the Salzach river and beneath the Obersalzberg mountain range. It lies close to the Austrian border with Bavaria, Germany. The nearest German village is Oberau, a few kilometres beyond the frontier. Dürrnberg is 4 km from Hallein, 20 km from Salzburg and 12 km from the Bavarian town of Berchtesgaden.

== Main sights ==
The Hallein Salt Mine, also known as Salzbergwerk Dürrnberg, is an underground salt mine located in the middle of the village. Opened for visitors in 1994, it hosts a museum and is receptive for tourism, similar to the other Austrian underground salt mines in Hallstatt and Altaussee.

== Gallery ==
=== Celtic artefacts from Dürrnberg ===
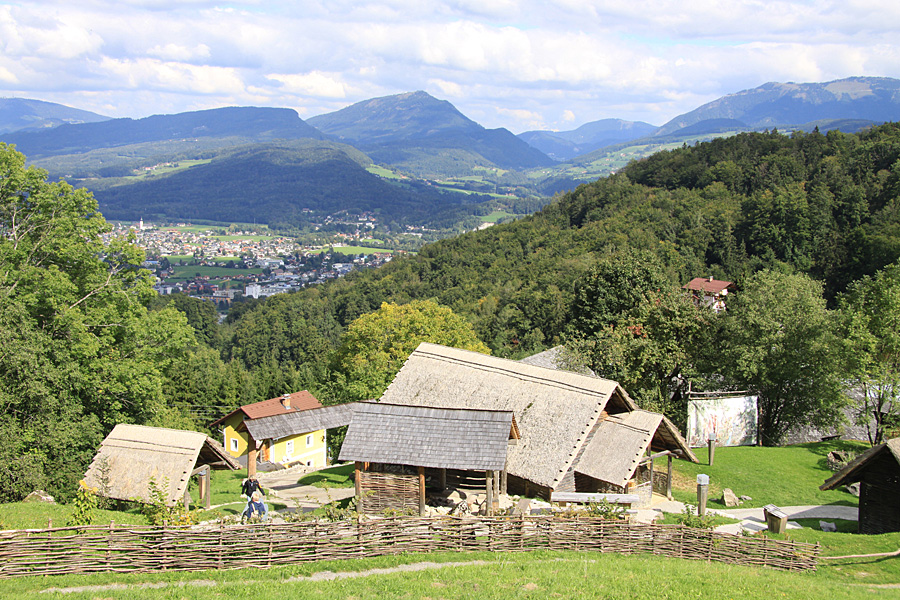
Celtic village reconstruction

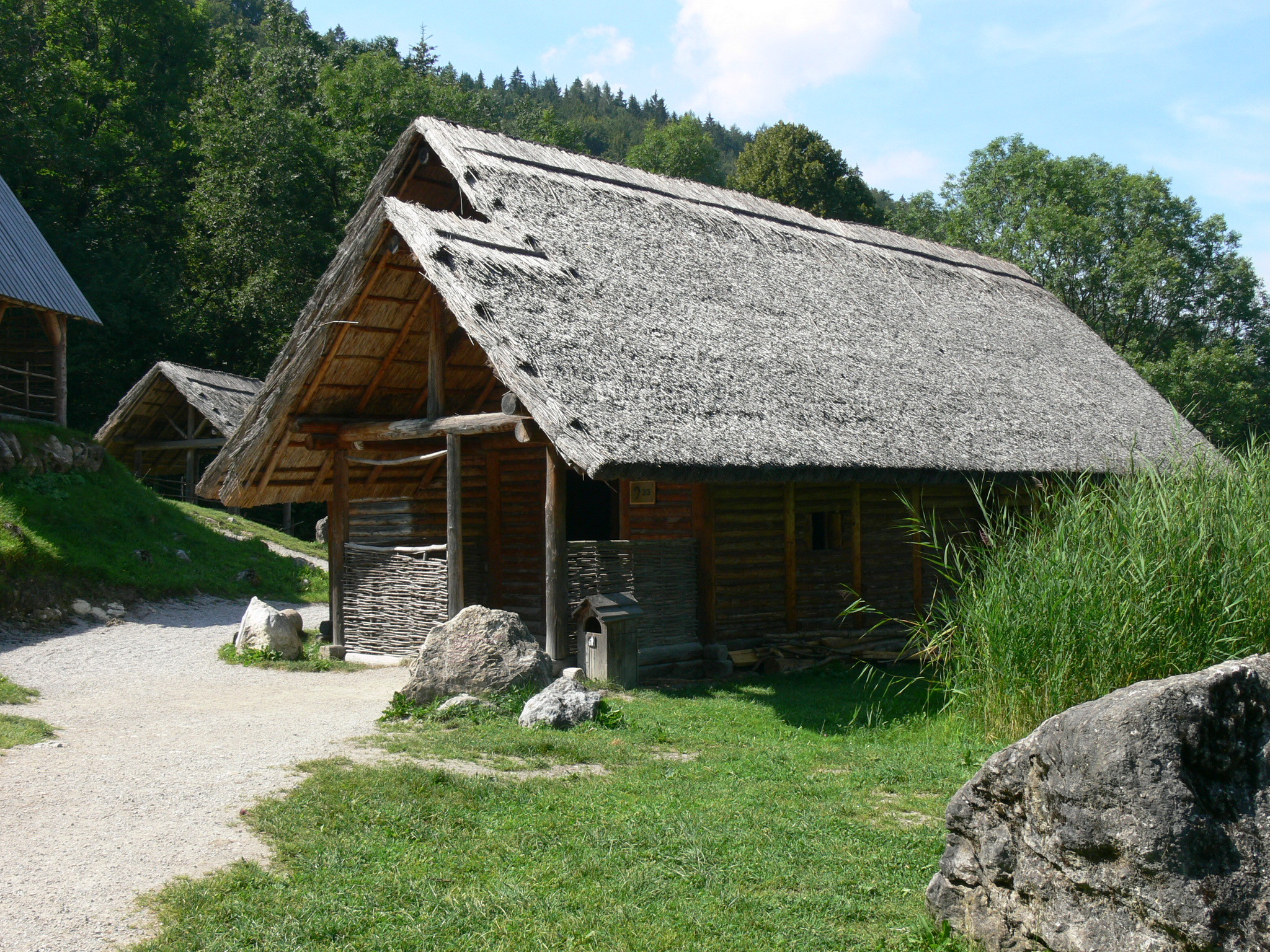
Celtic village reconstruction

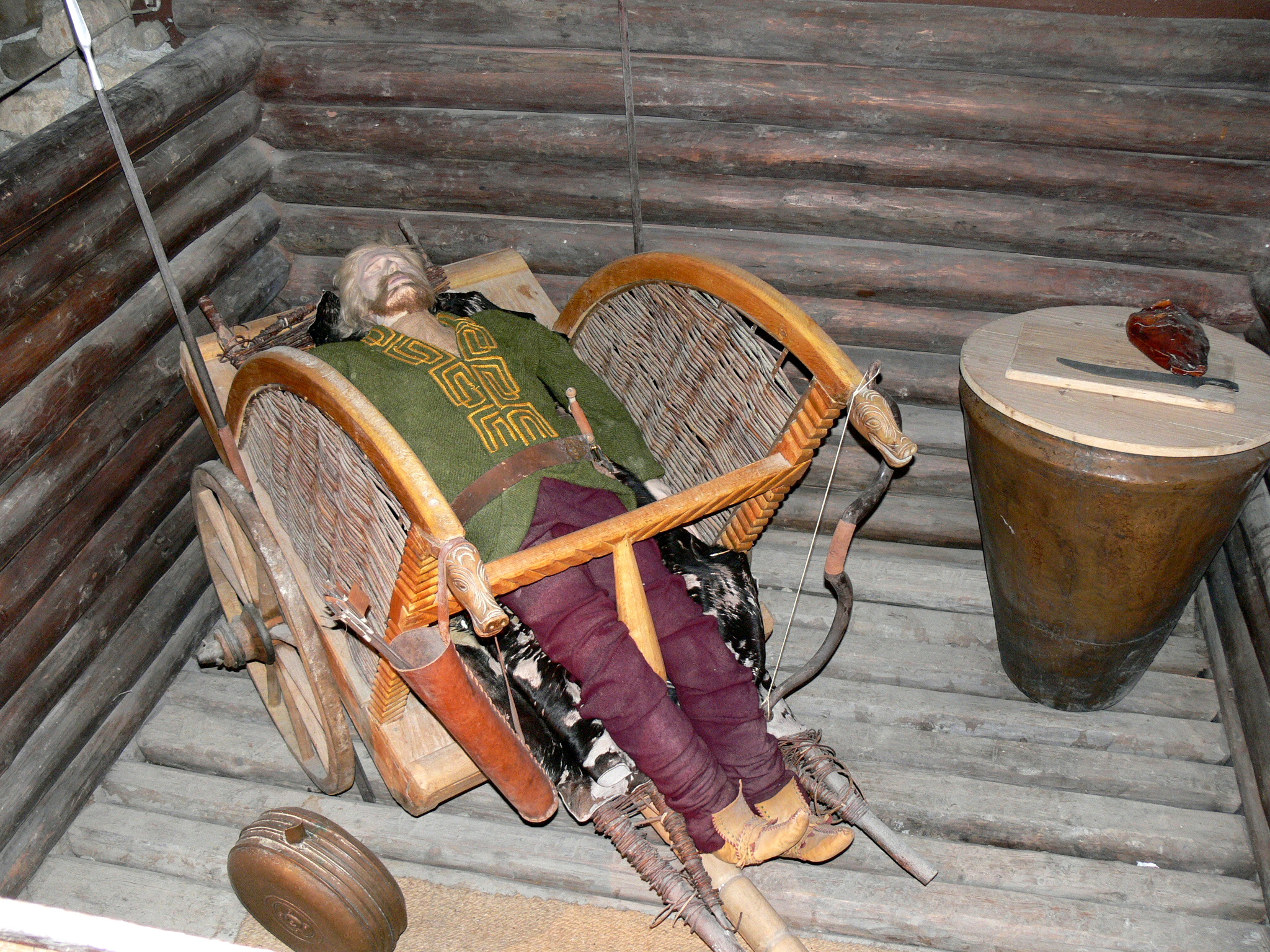

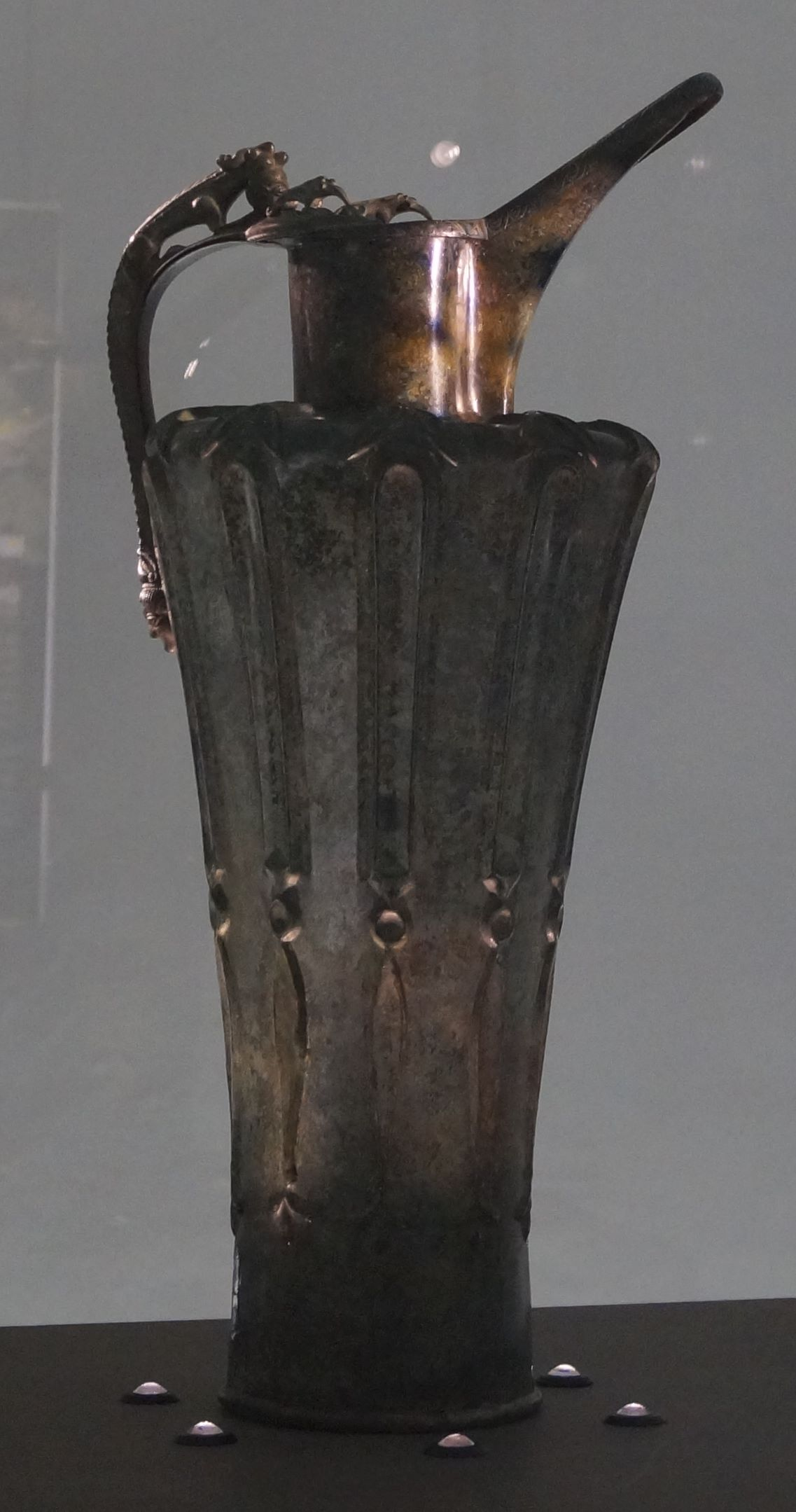
Dürrnberg Celtic flagon

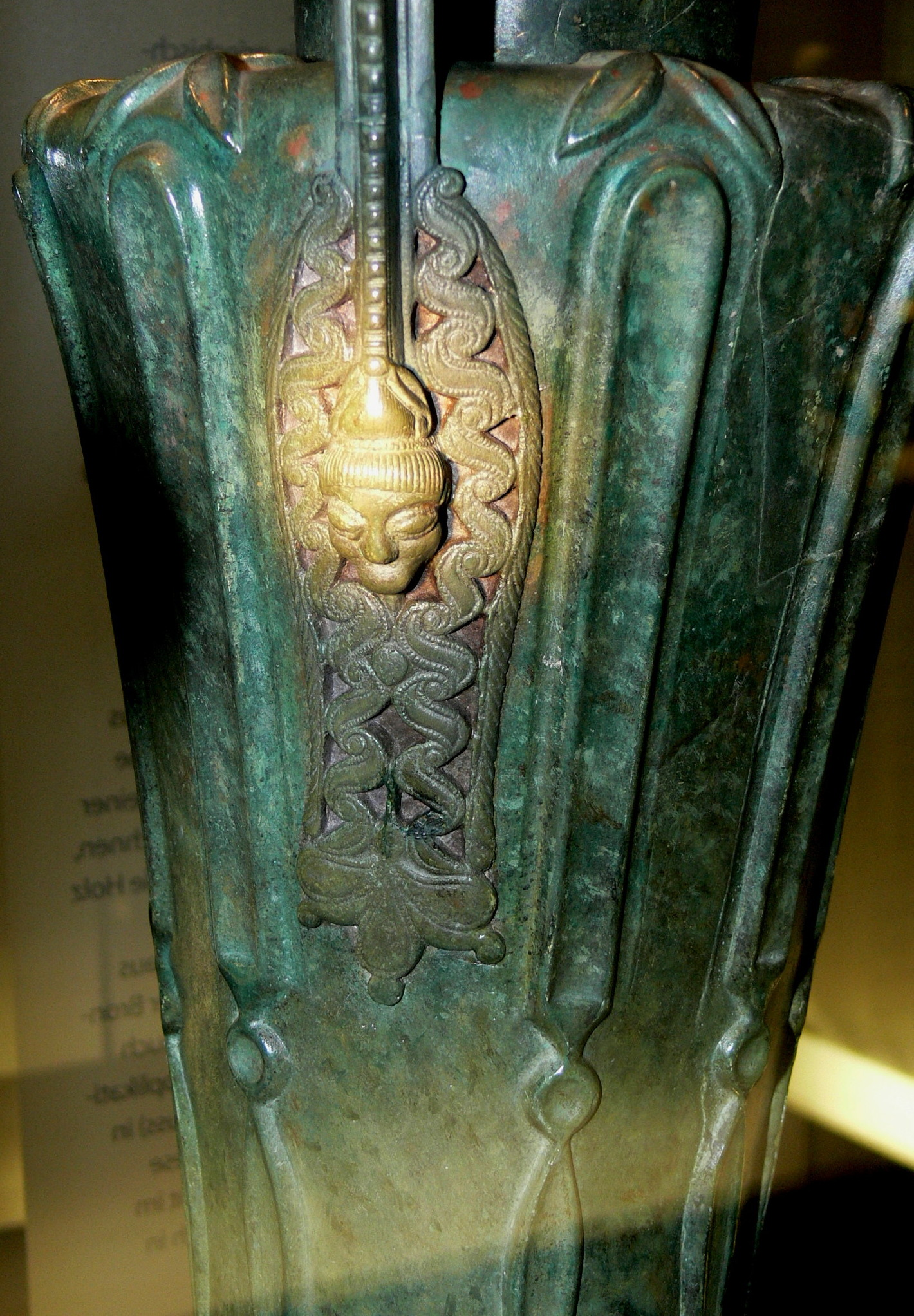

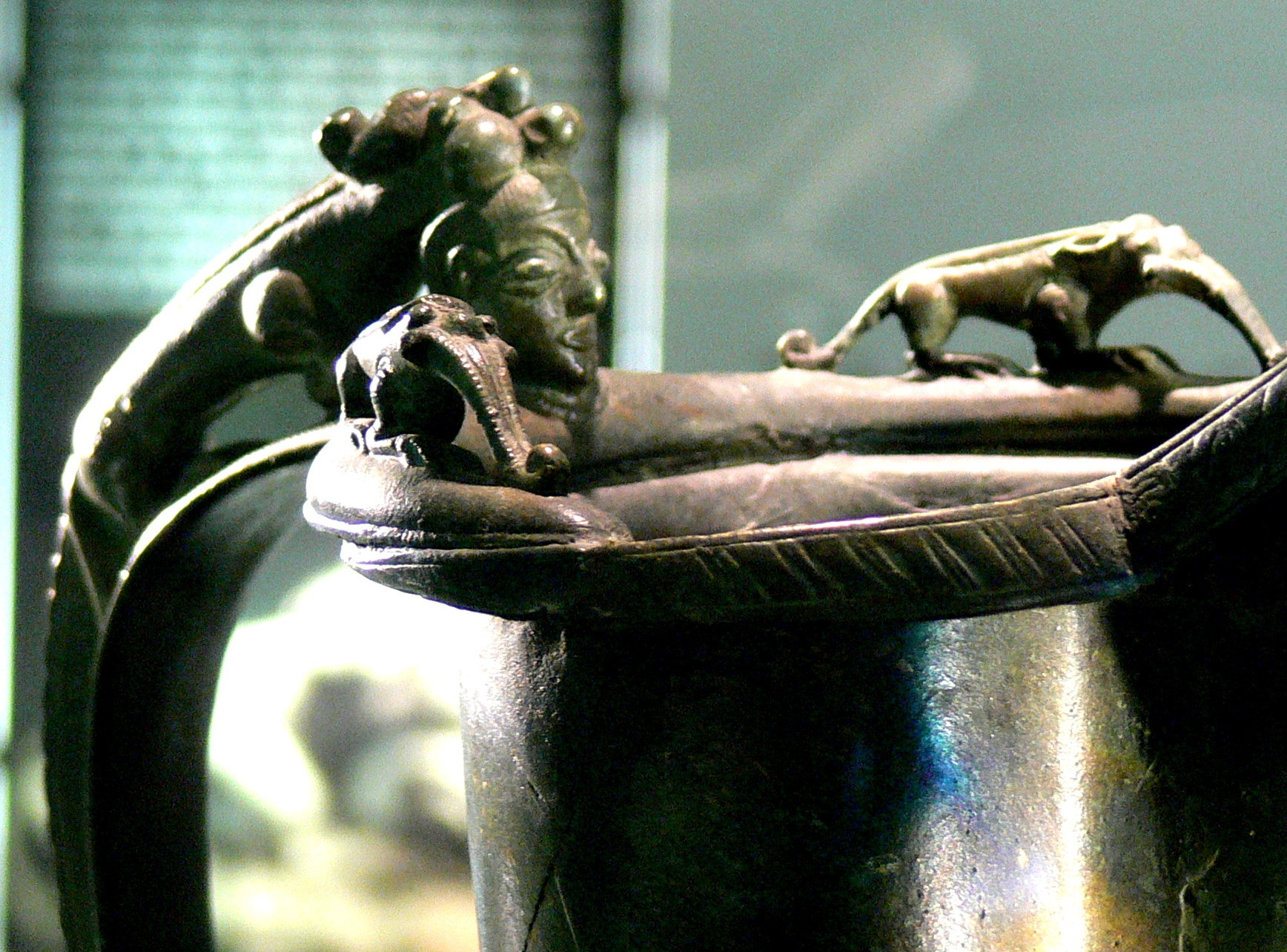

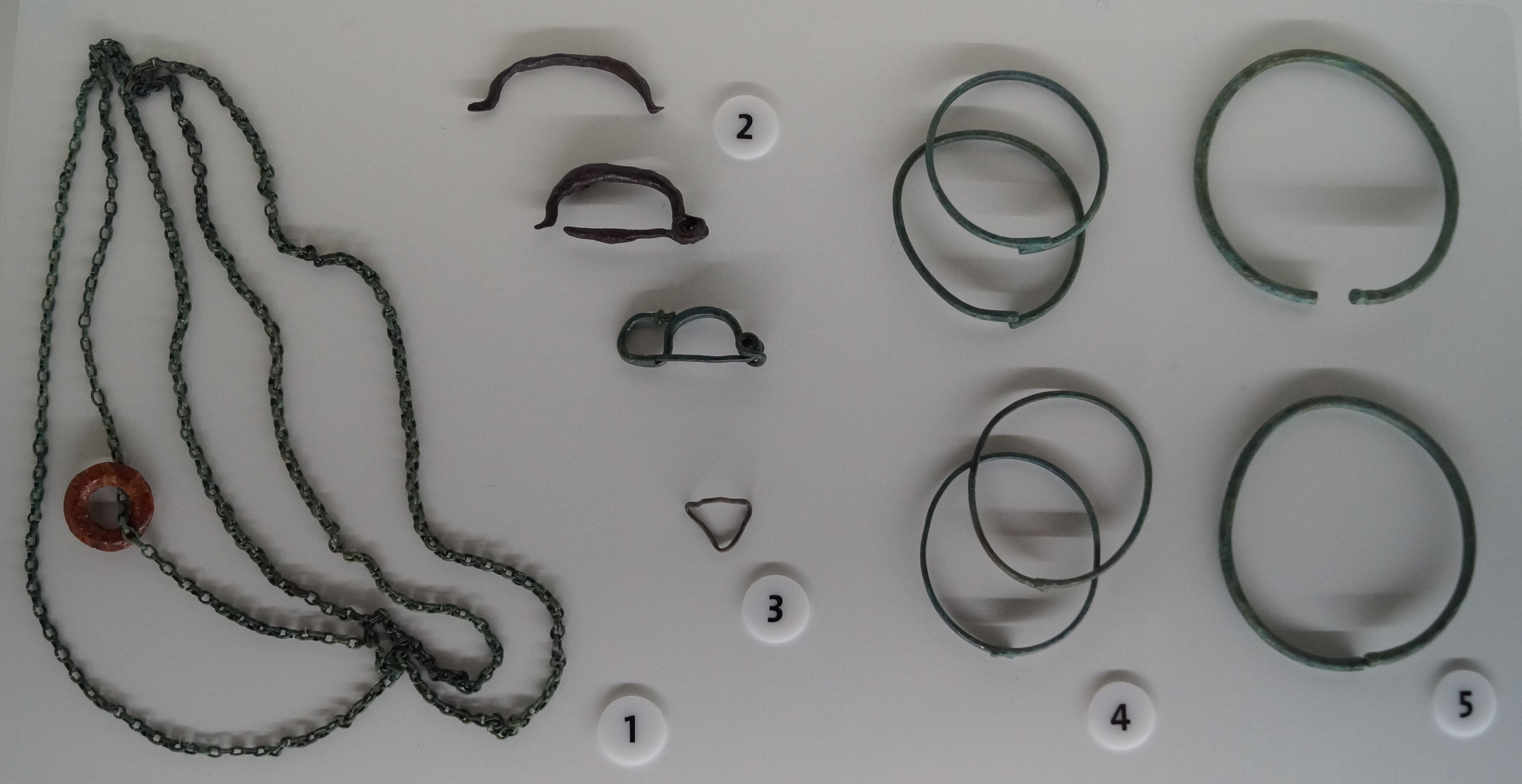

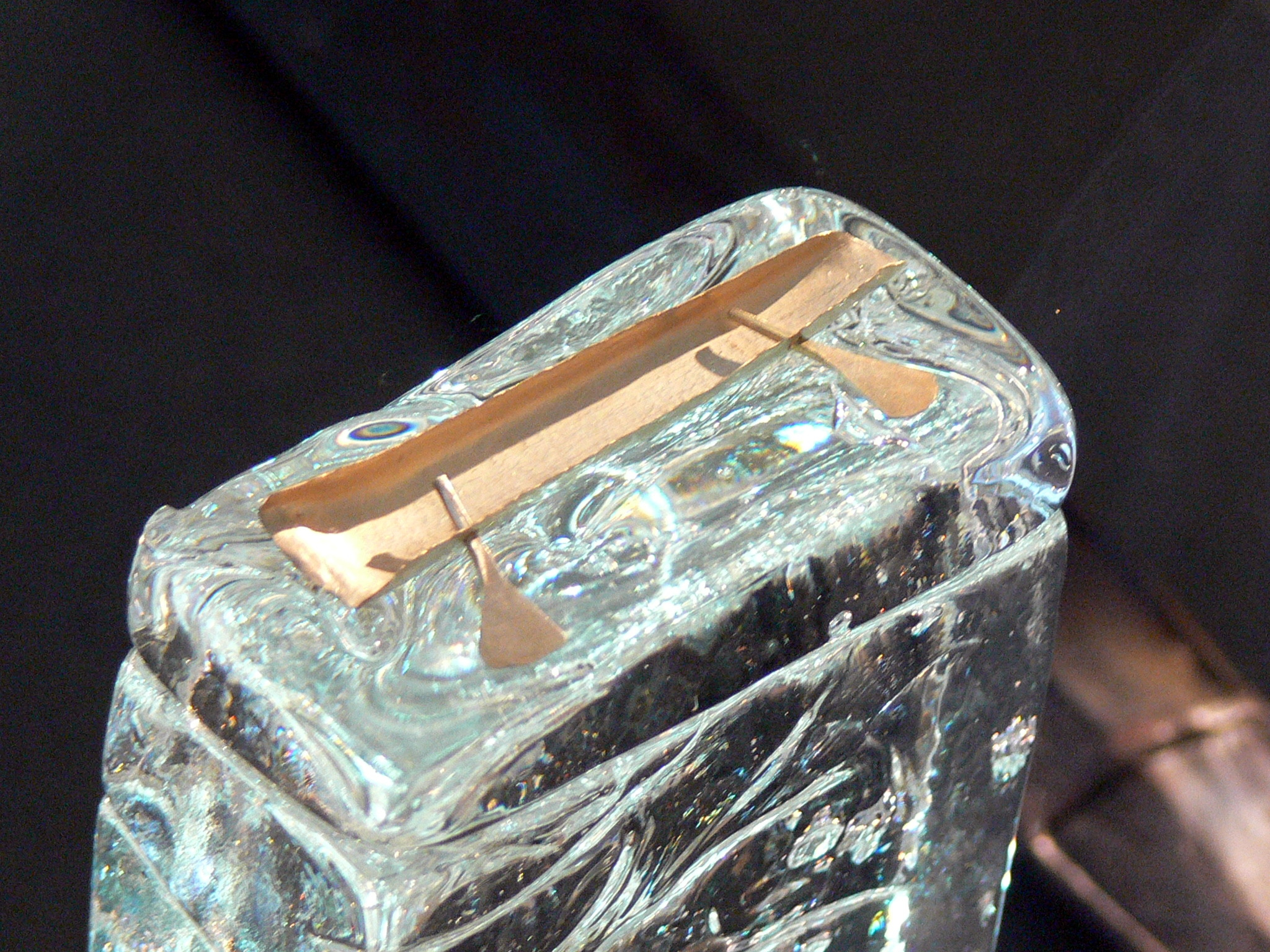
Celtic gold boat model

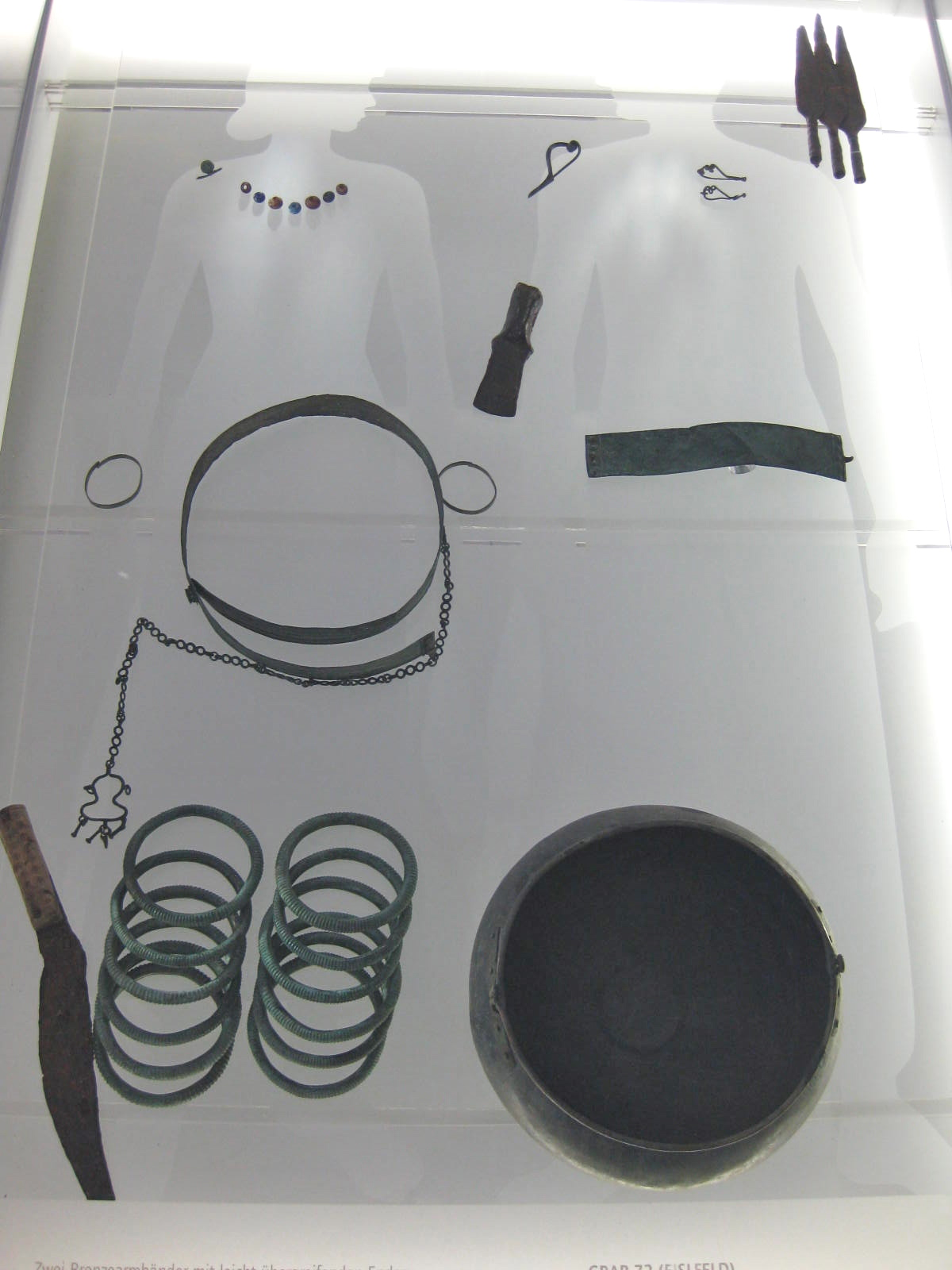

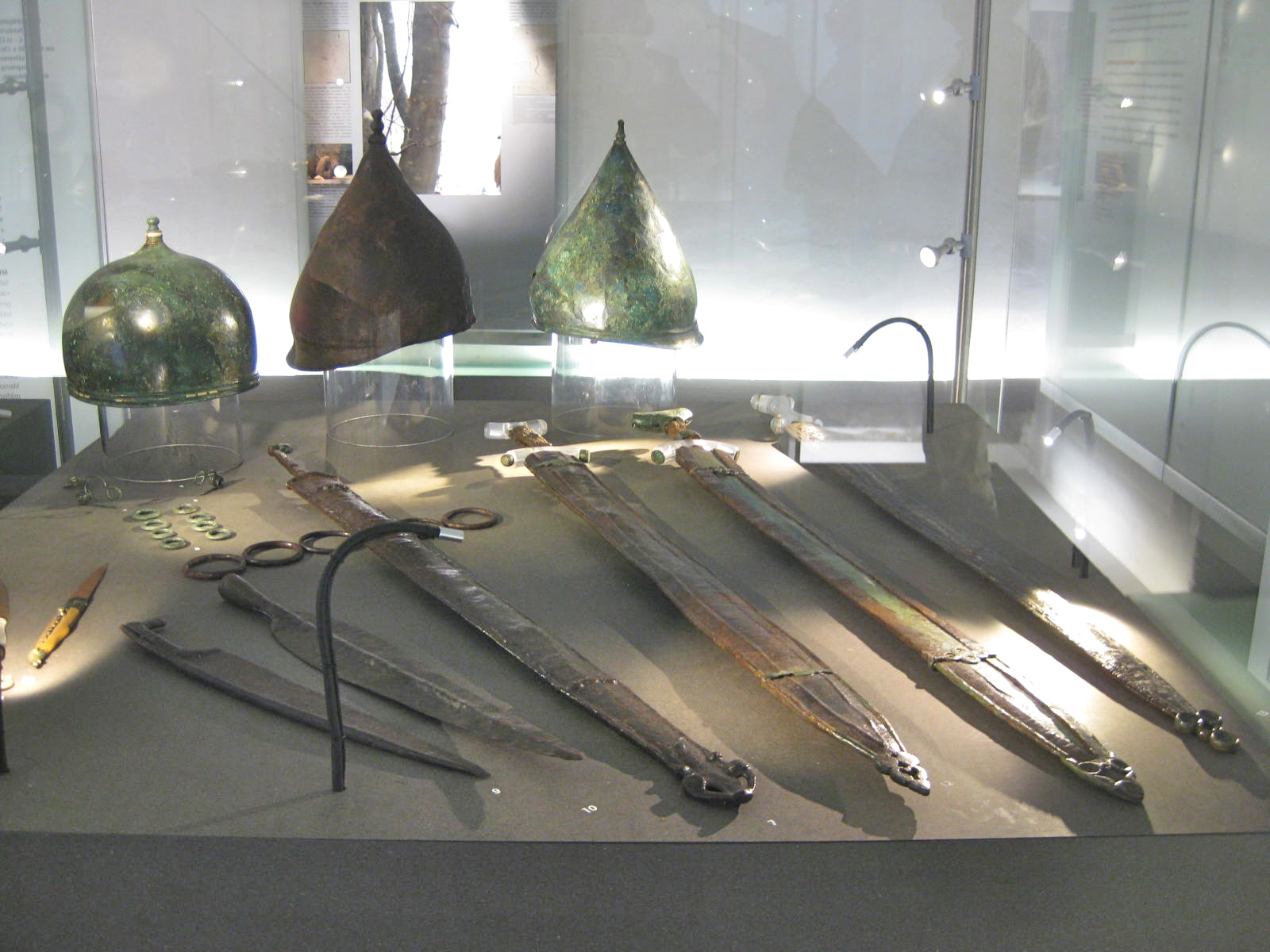

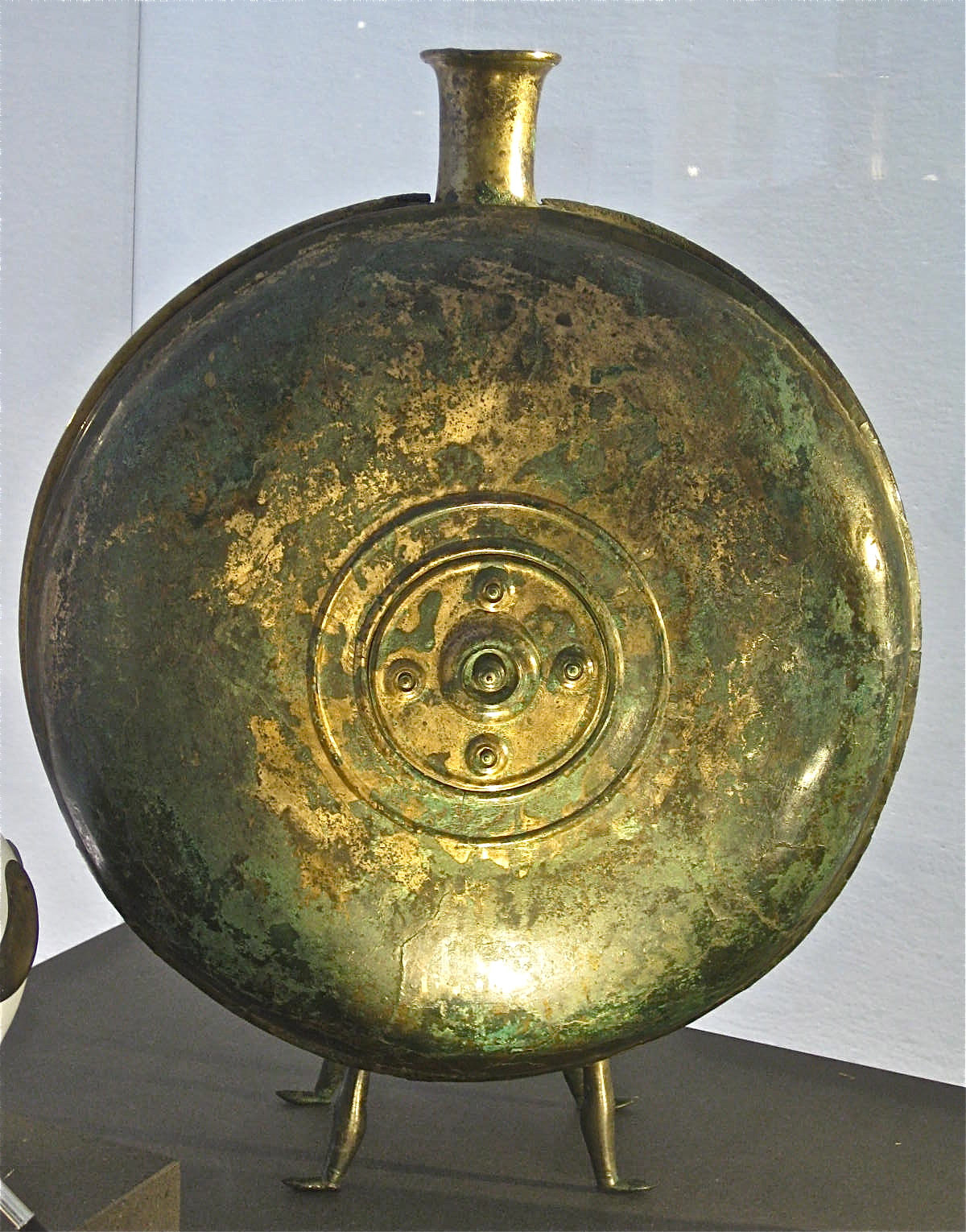

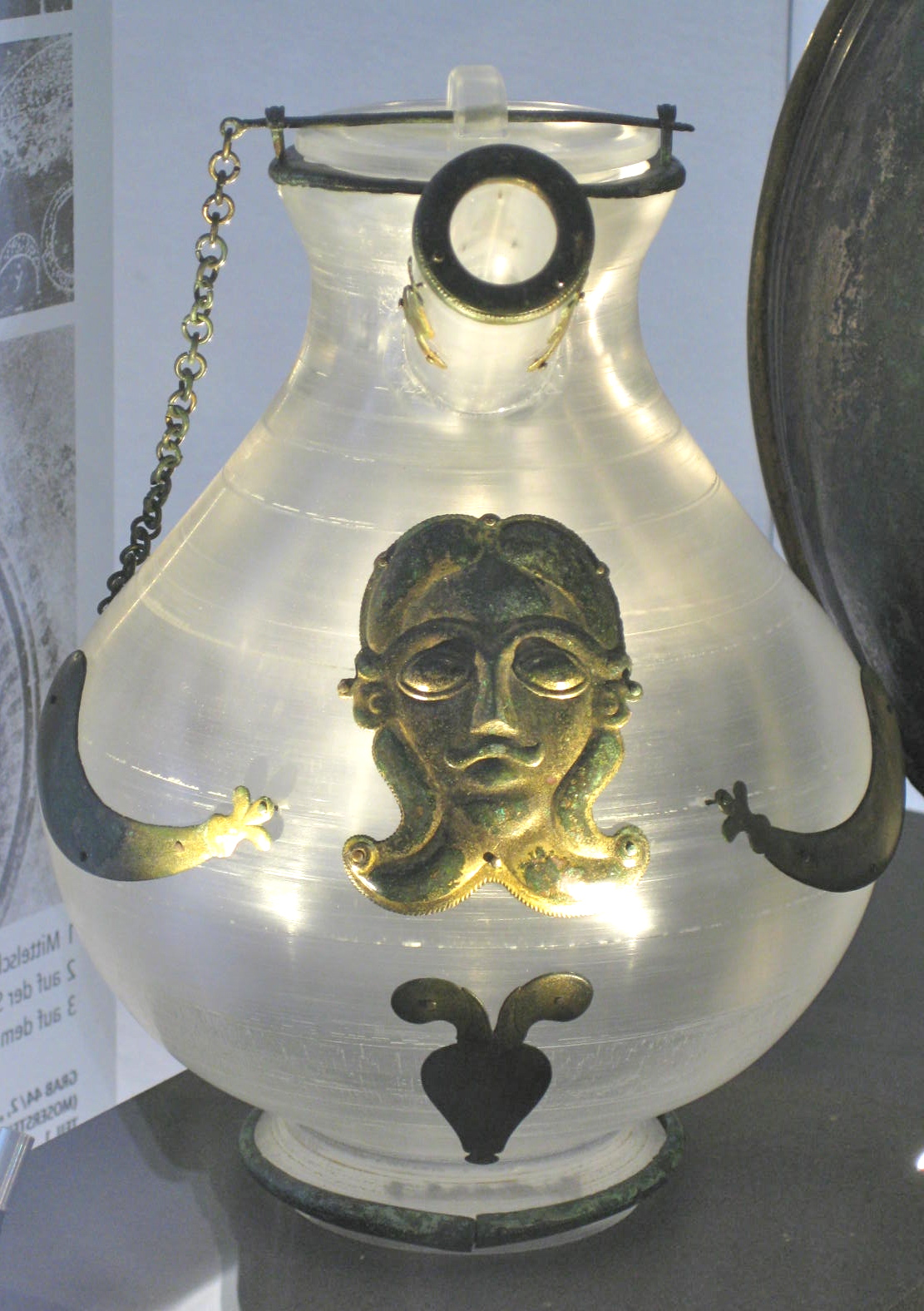

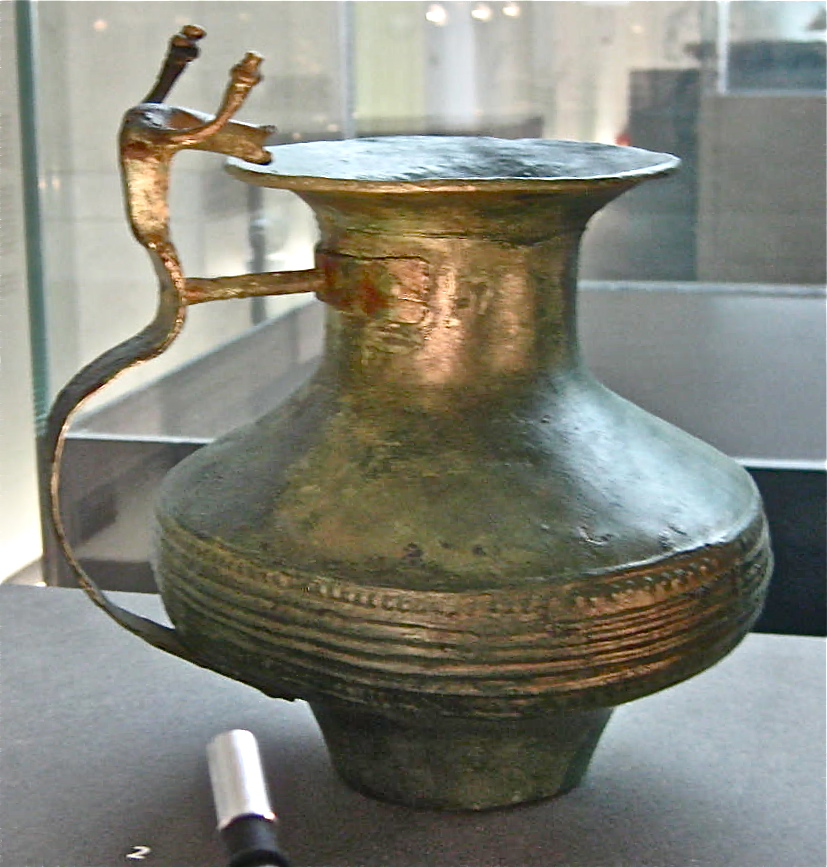

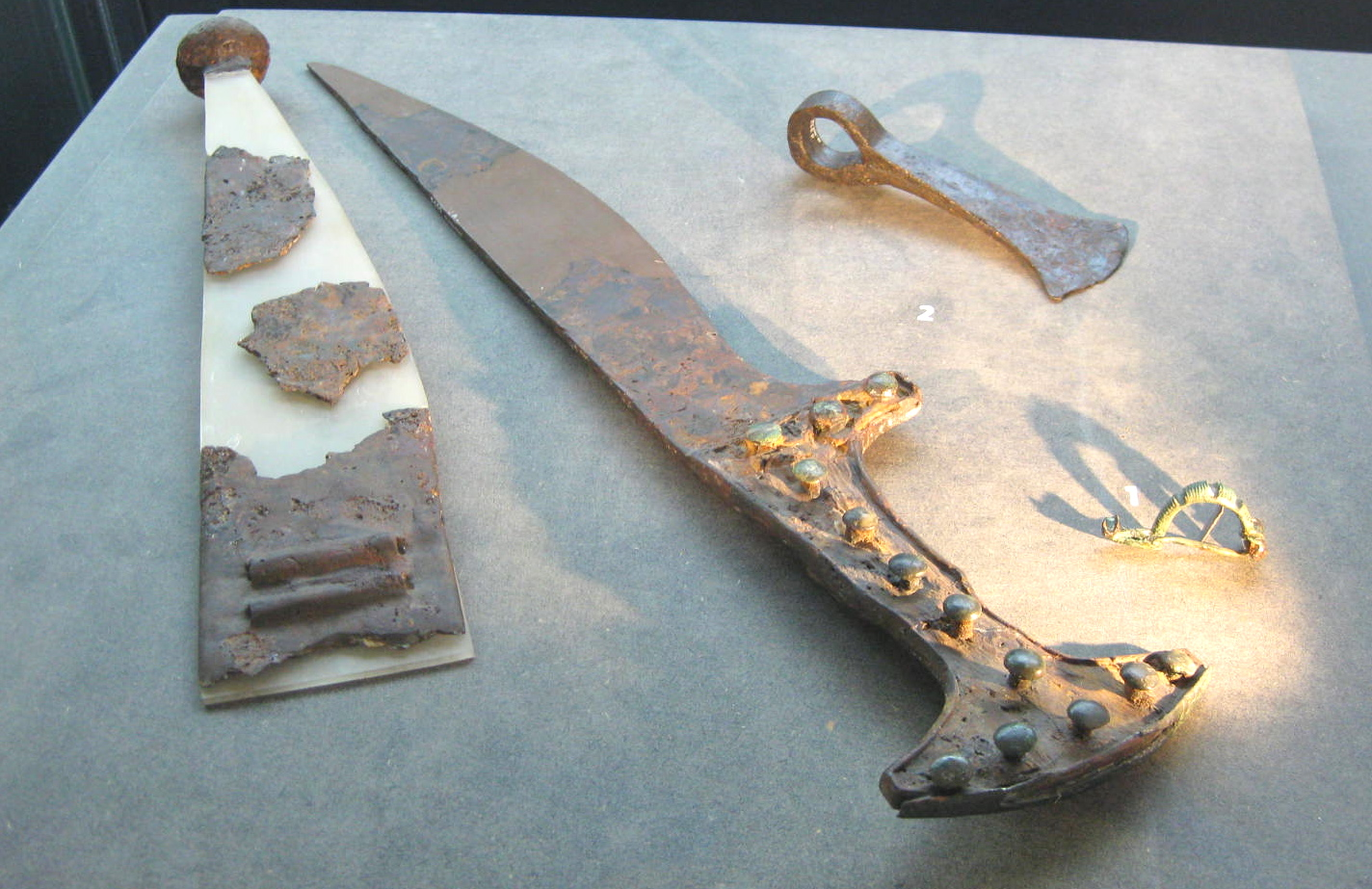

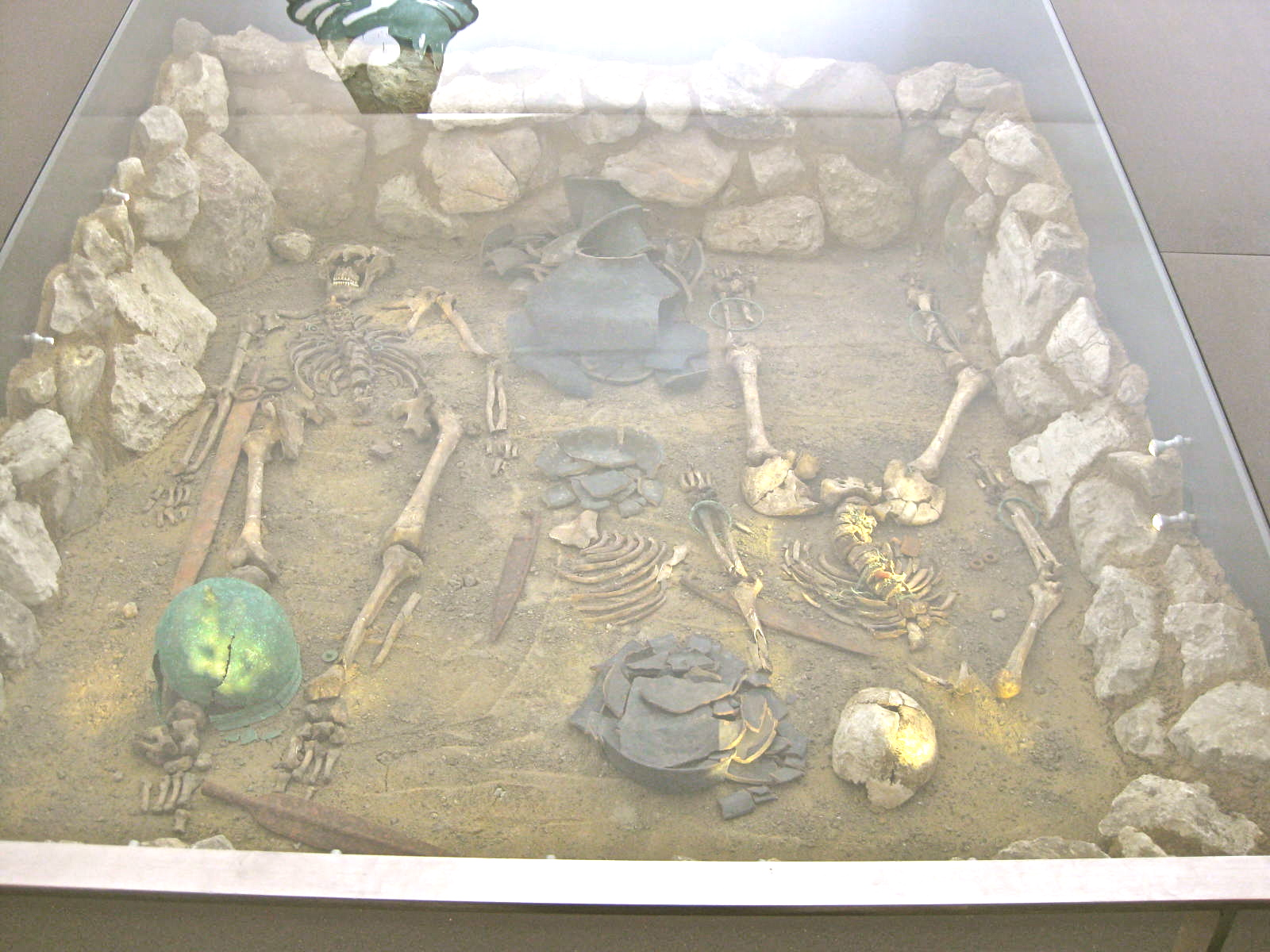

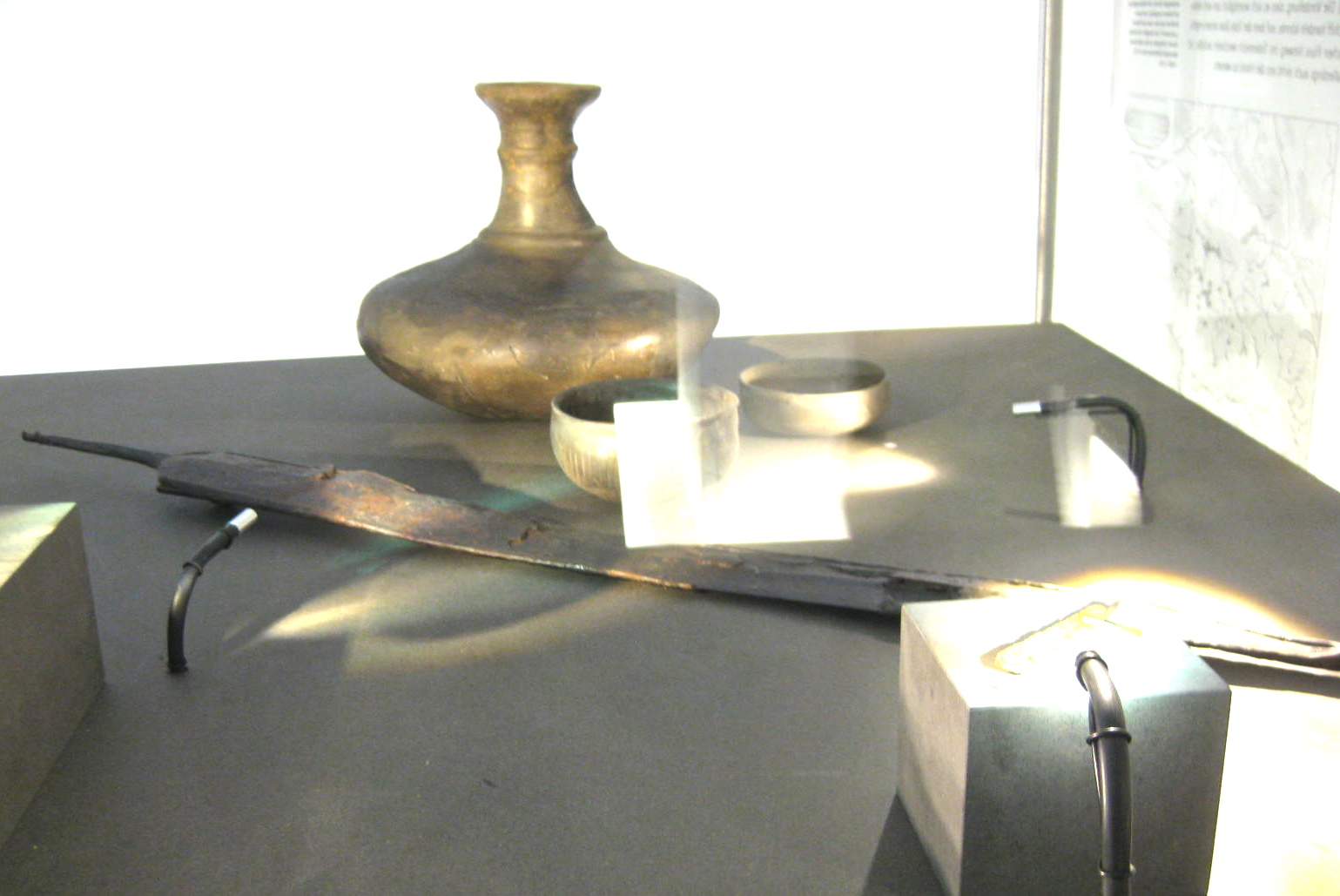

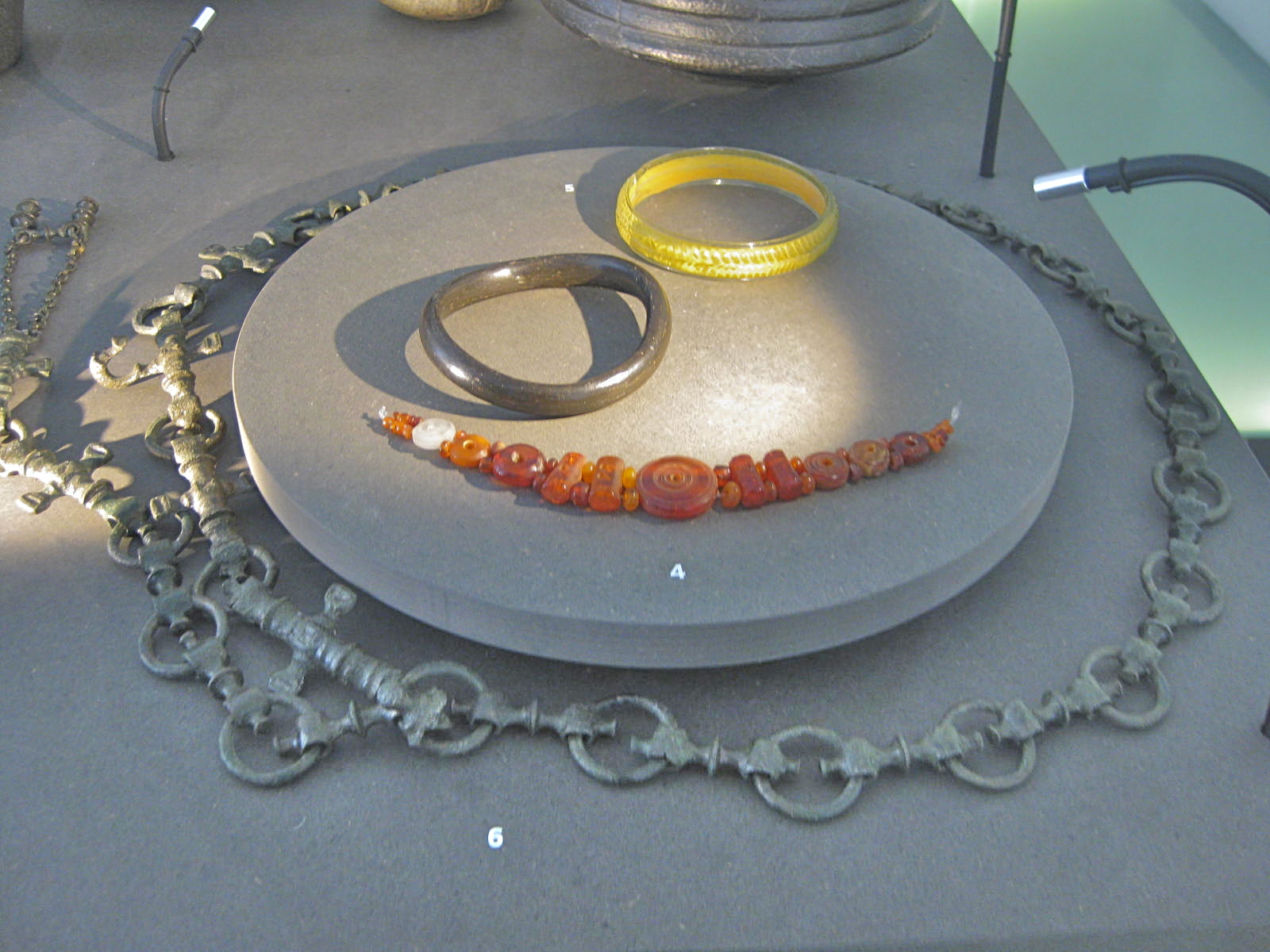

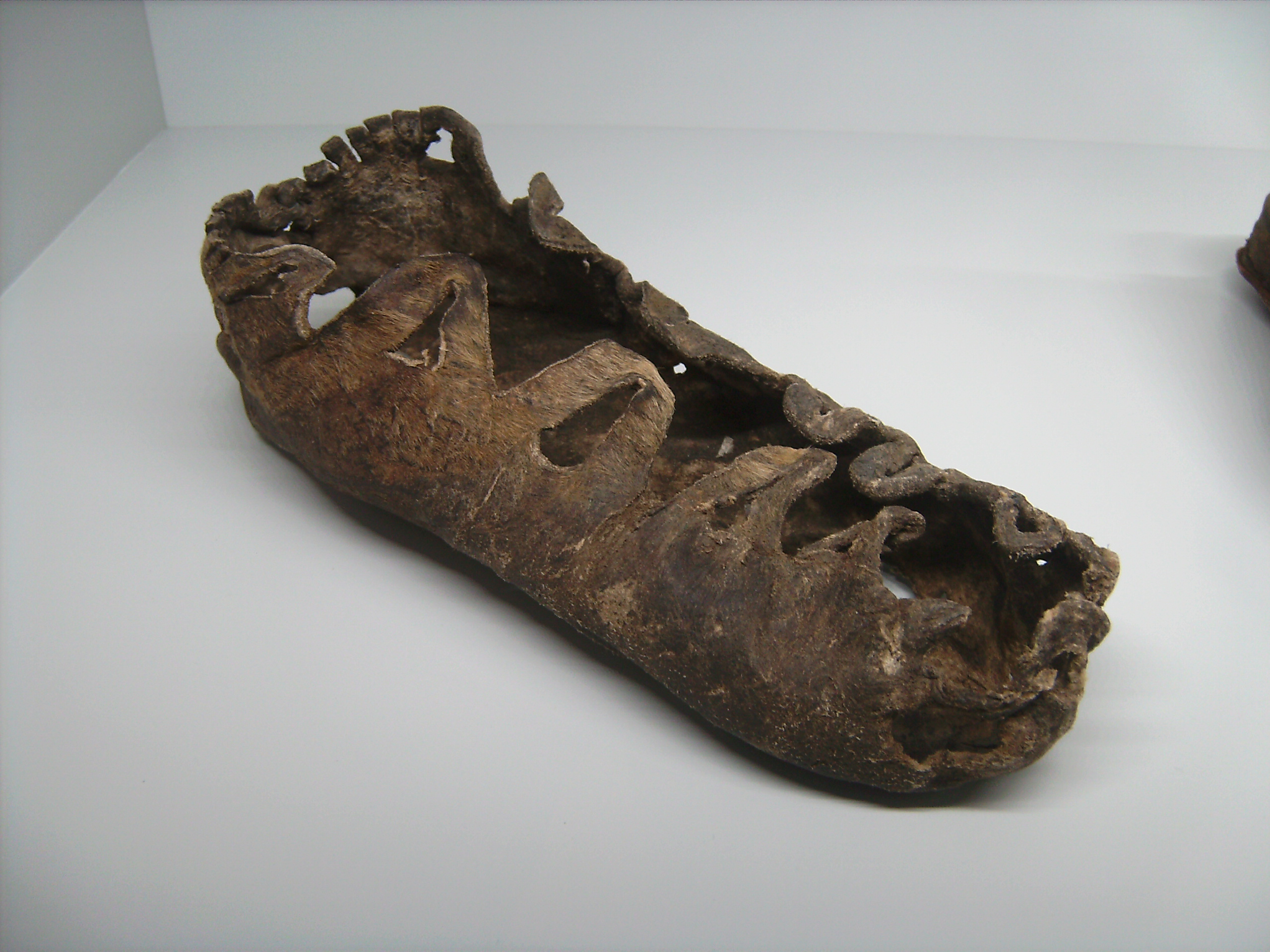
Celtic leather shoe, 5th century BC

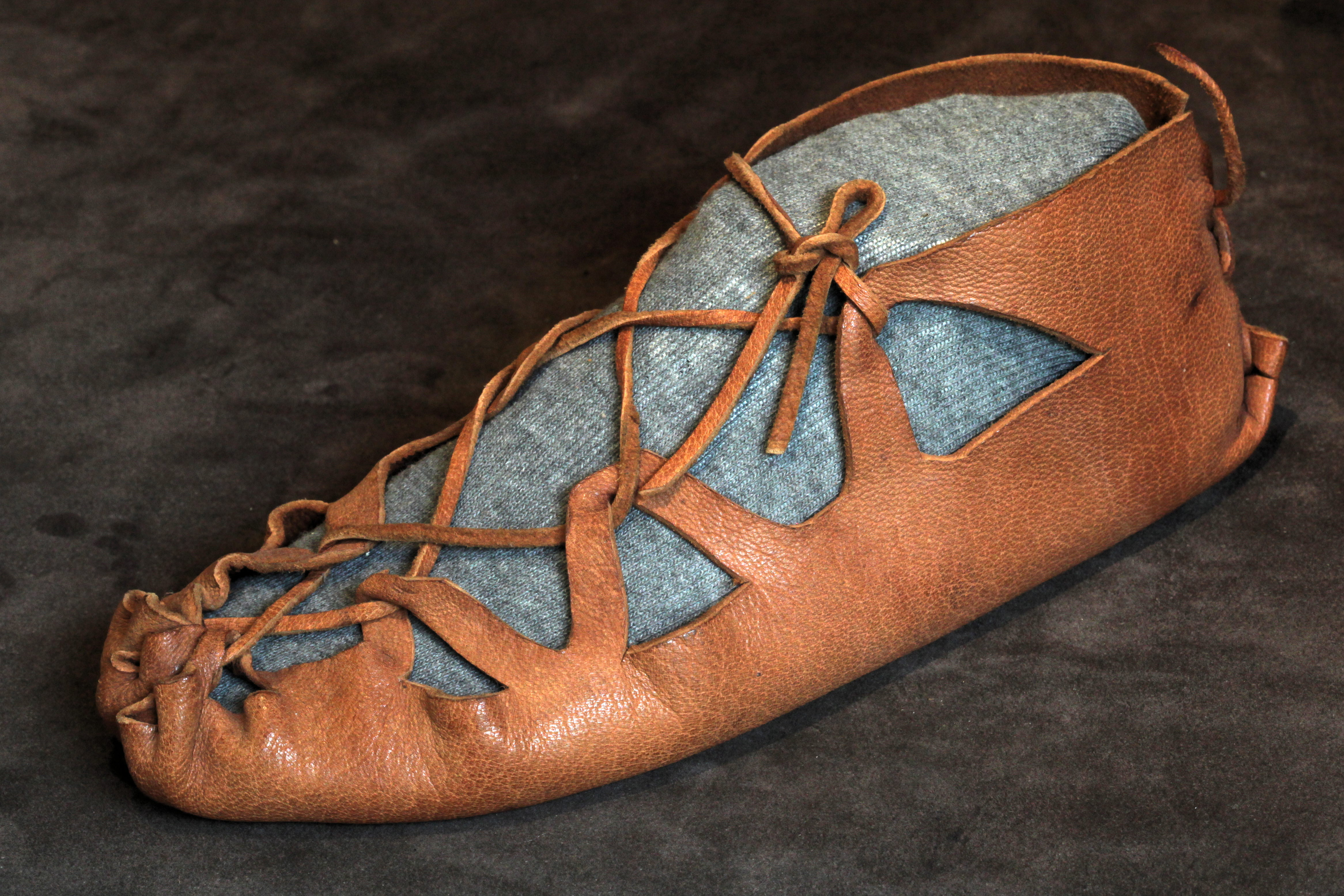

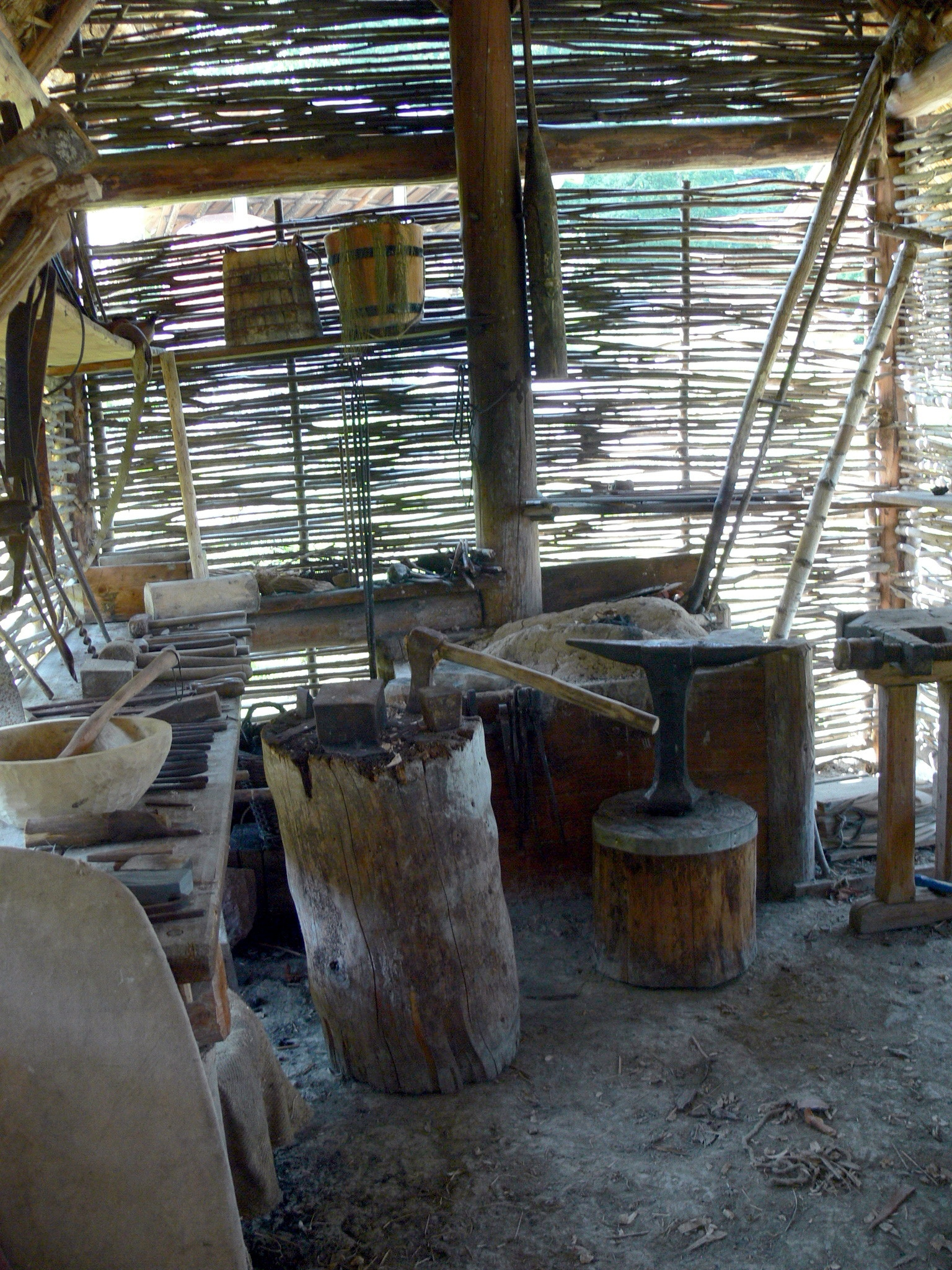

== See also ==
- Bavarian-Austrian Salt Treaty
