= Federalism in Germany =

Administrative divisions of Germany (clickable image)

Federalism in Germany is made of the states of Germany and the federal government. The central government, the states, and the German municipalities have different tasks and partially competing regions of responsibilities ruled by a complex system of checks and balances.

== History ==
German federalism dates back to the founding of the Holy Roman Empire in the Middle Ages, to the reforms that came with the Peace of Westphalia and to the constitution of the German Empire from 1871.

Following German unification, German federalism came into conflict with German nationalism. Nationalists argued for power to be concentrated in the central government in Berlin, but were resisted by monarchs and their governments in the various German states outside the Kingdom of Prussia, with the Kingdom of Bavaria in particular keen to defend the rights afforded to it in the Imperial constitution.

After the end of World War II, the federal nature of Germany was restored, after having been effectively abolished under the Nazis. The current German constitution, adopted in 1949, protects Germany's federal nature in the so-called eternity clause.

Since re-unification in 1990, the Federal Republic has consisted of sixteen states: the ten states of the Federal Republic before re-unification ("West Germany"), the five new states of the former East Germany, and Berlin.

== Division of powers ==
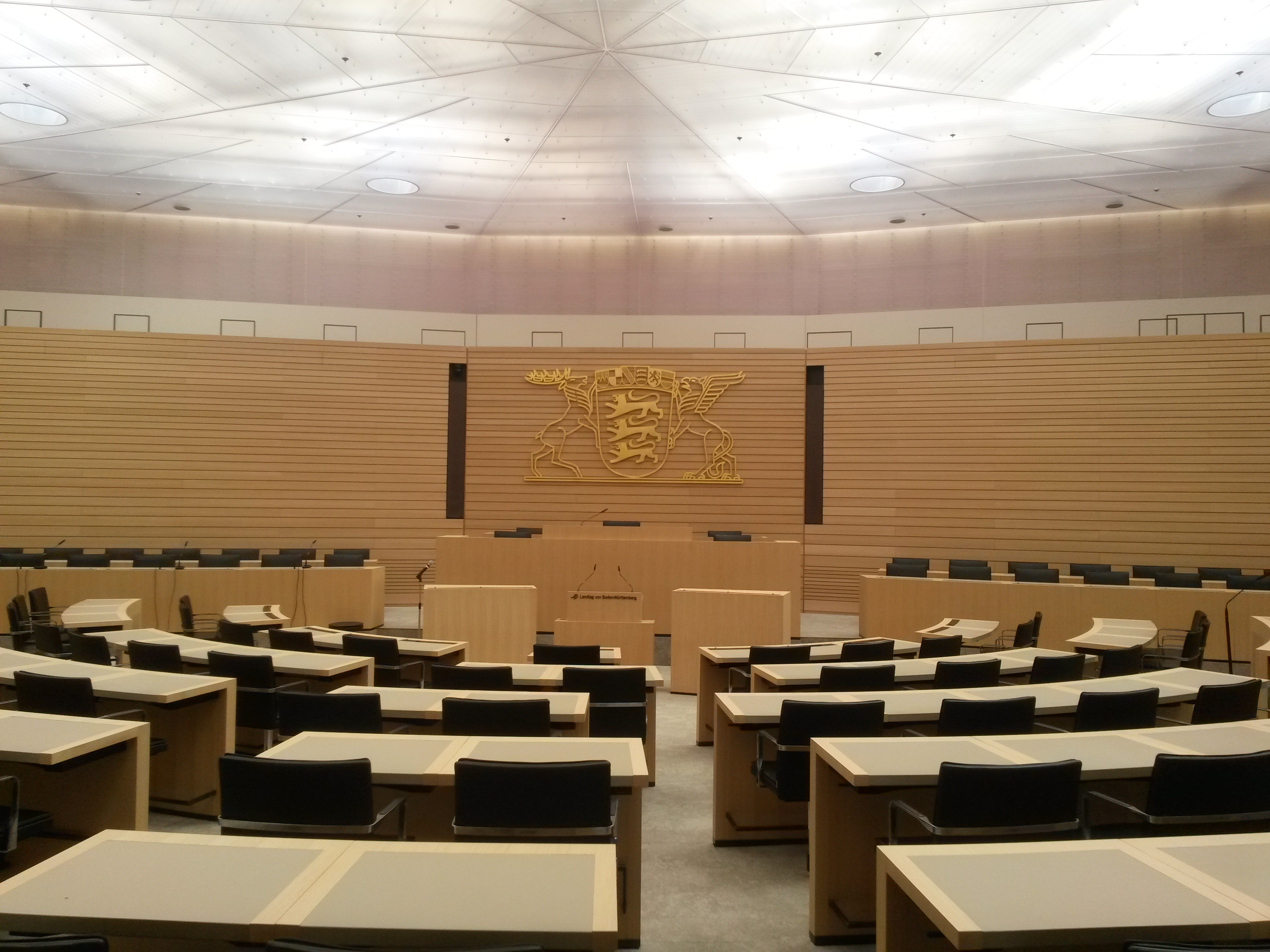
Landtag (state parliament) of the state of Baden-Württemberg

The Basic Law for the Federal Republic of Germany divides authority between the federal government and the states (German: "Länder"), with the general principle governing relations articulated in Article 30: "Except as otherwise provided or permitted by this Basic Law, the exercise of state powers and the discharge of state functions is a matter for the Länder." Thus, the federal government can exercise authority only in those areas specified in the Basic Law. The states are represented at the federal level through the Bundesrat, which has a role similar to the upper house in a true bicameral parliament.

The Basic Law divides the federal and state governments' legislative responsibilities into exclusive federal powers (Articles 71 and 73), competing powers (Articles 72, 74), deviation powers (Article 72), and exclusive state powers (Article 70). The exclusive legislative jurisdiction of the federal government includes defense, foreign affairs, immigration, citizenship, communications, and currency standards, whereas the states have exclusive jurisdiction on the police (excluding federal police, which has jurisdiction on airports, railways and national borders), education, the press, freedom of assembly, public housing, prisons and media affairs, among others. Even in cases where the states have exclusive jurisdiction, they sometimes choose to work with each other and come to a basic agreement with the other states, which is then passed by the sixteen state parliaments and thereby enshrined into law nationwide (see: Conference of Minister-Presidents). This is done in order to avoid legal patchworks. An example of this is the states' online gambling regulations.

In the areas of nature conservation, university degrees, and university admission, among others, state legislation can deviate from (i.e. amend or replace) federal legislation.

The federal and state governments share concurrent powers in several areas, including, but not limited to, business law, civil law, welfare, taxation, consumer protection, public holidays, and public health. In many concurrent powers, however, state legislation only remains in effect as long as there is no federal legislation that contradicts its contents, though the passage of such federal legislation may be subject to additional legal requirements, as stipulated by Article 72, Section 2 of the Basic Law.

The areas of shared responsibility for the states and the federal government were enlarged by an amendment to the Basic Law in 1969 (Articles 91a and 91b), which calls for joint action in areas of broad social concern such as higher education, regional economic development, and agricultural reform.

International relations, including international treaties, are primarily the responsibility of the federal level but, as in other federations, the constituent states have limited powers in this area. As provided in Article 23, Article 24, and Article 32 of the Basic Law, the states (Länder) have the right to representation at the federal level (i.e. through the Bundesrat) in matters of international relations that affect them, including the transfer of sovereignty to international organizations and, with the consent of the federal government, have limited powers to conclude international treaties.

Some older treaties between German states and other countries also remain in effect. The Bavarian–Austrian Salt Treaty of 1829 (German: Konvention zwischen Bayern und Österreich über die beiderseitigen Salinenverhältnisse vom 18. März 1829), for instance, is the oldest European treaty still in effect. In 1957, the government of Bavaria used a revision of the treaty to actively claim the states' rights against the will and claims of the federal government.

== States' role in federal politics ==
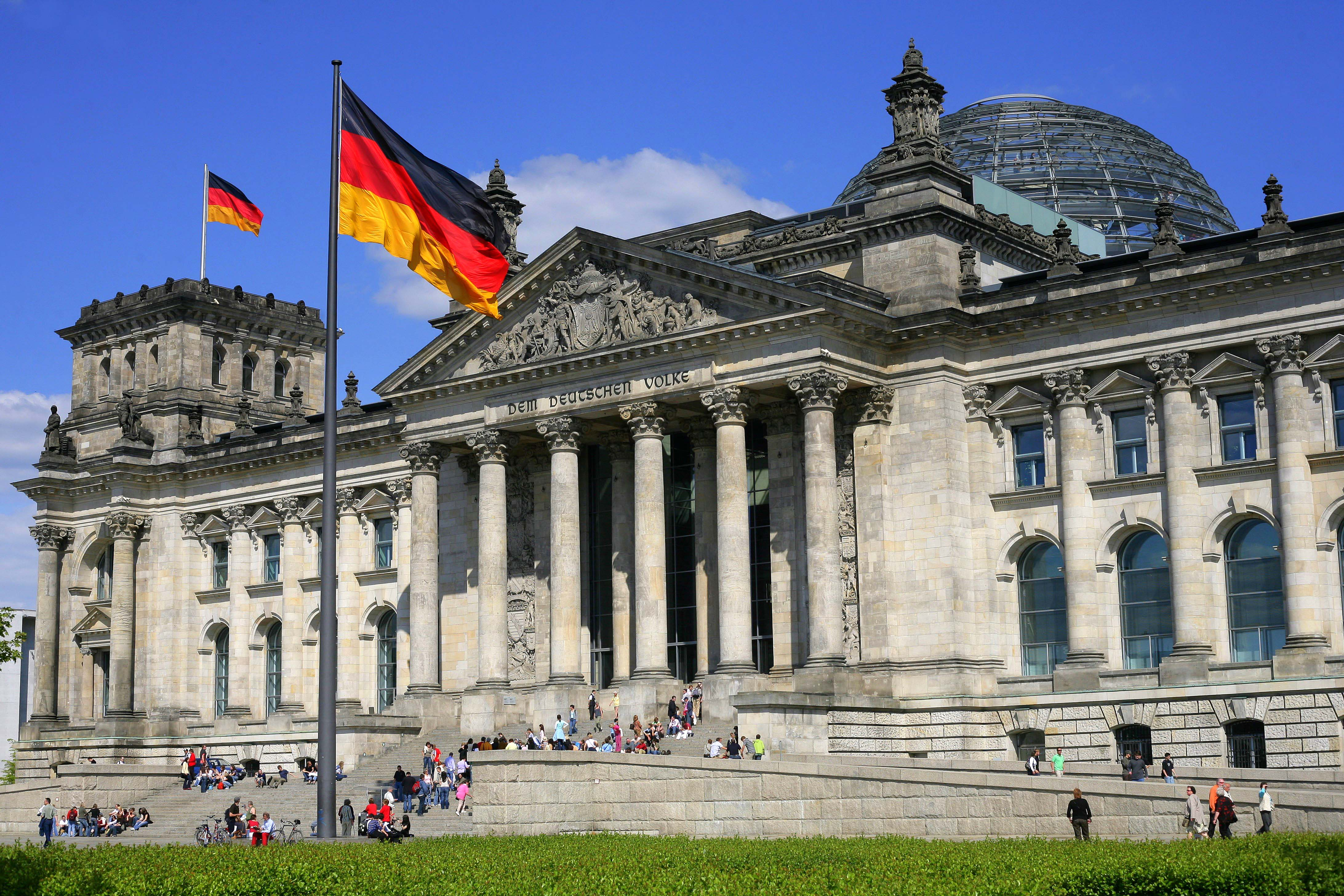
Bundestag building

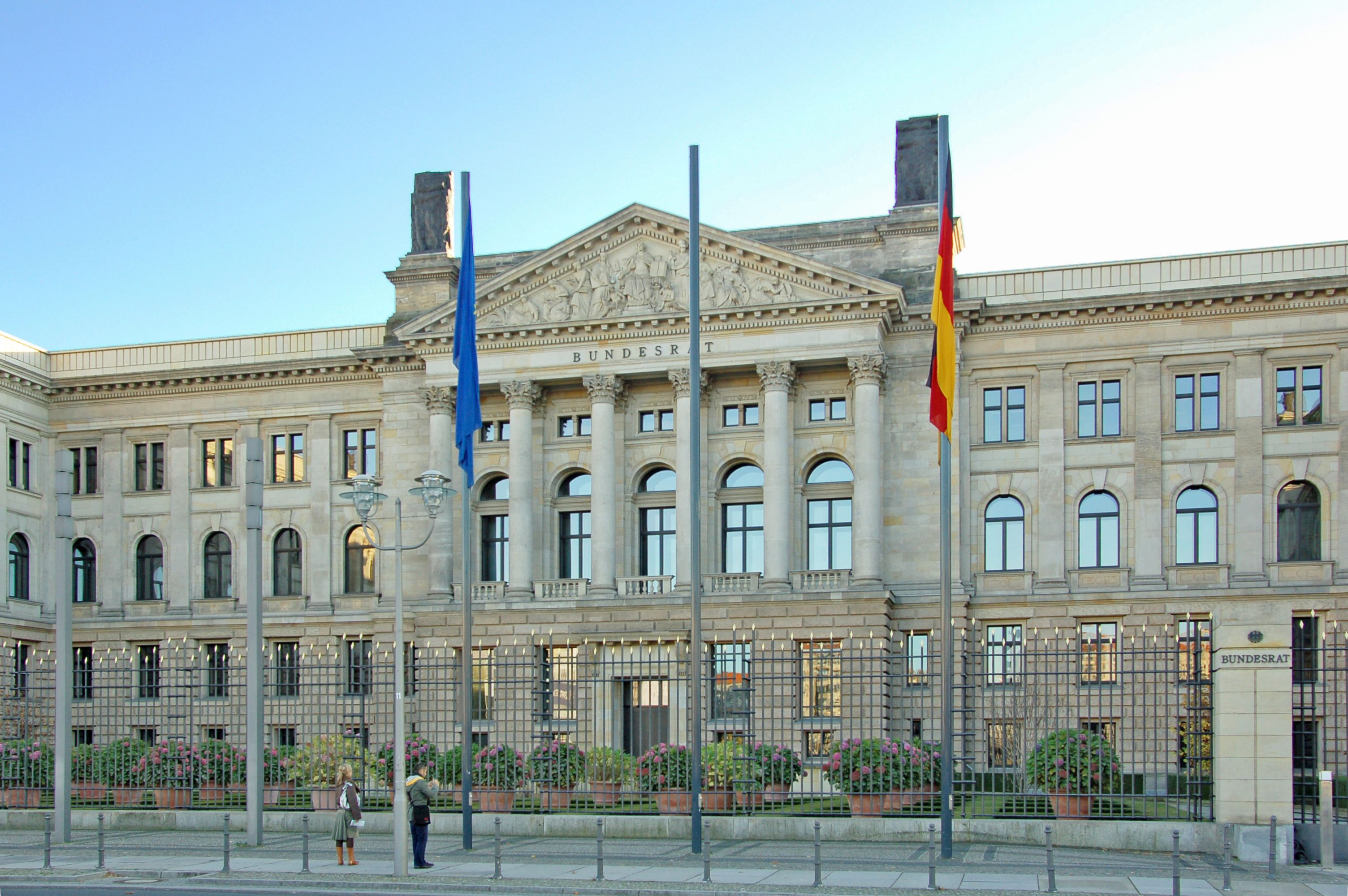
Bundesrat building

=== Federal legislation ===
The Bundestag (meaning Federal Diet) is Germany's federal parliament and the de facto lower house of the federal legislature, and the Bundesrat (Federal Council), which represents the states at the federal level, is the de facto upper house. The entirety of the Bundestag is elected in a single federal election, which is typically held every four years, unlike the Bundesrat, which is composed of the sixteen state governments and therefore prone to change in its composition frequently, as the various states hold elections at different times with little to no coordination. As a result, the federal governing coalition (which requires a majority in only the lower house, i.e. the Bundestag in order to be able to govern, like in most other parliamentary systems) rarely has a stable majority in the upper house, i.e. the Bundesrat, and is therefore required to compromise with opposition parties in order to pass legislation that requires the Bundesrat's approval.

The Bundestag is typically the dominant body in ordinary federal lawmaking, but the Bundesrat's explicit consent (an absolute majority of members voting in favour) is required for every approval law, i.e. bills that affect state finances or administrational duties in some way, which makes up roughly 40% of all federal legislation, otherwise the bill is effectively vetoed and this veto cannot be overridden by the Bundestag. The Bundesrat also has the ability to veto every other type of legislation, so-called objection laws, by an absolute majority and two-thirds majority of all members, though this veto can be overridden by an absolute majority of all members and a two-thirds majority of voting members representing at least of half of all members in the Bundestag, respectively.

A two-thirds majority of all members in the Bundestag and a two-thirds majority of all voting members (representing at least half of members) in the Bundesrat is required for any constitutional amendment.

=== Federal judiciary ===
In a rotating fashion, Federal Constitutional Court judges are elected by a two-thirds majority vote by the Bundestag and the Bundesrat. By a majority vote, judges of other federal courts (e.g. Federal Court of Justice) are elected simultaneously by both the federation and the states with each having half of the voting power.

=== President ===
The president of Germany, a largely symbolic position given Germany's parliamentary system but nonetheless the official head of state, is also elected by both the federal parliament and state legislatures coequally (see: Federal Convention (Germany)).

=== Composition of state representation ===
The makeup of the Bundesrat and therefore the representation of the states at the federal level is fundamentally different from the upper houses of some other federal systems, such as the Swiss Council of States or the United States Senate. In those countries, upper house legislators are elected separately and are therefore independent from their respective state governments. In contrast, the members of the Bundesrat are merely delegates of state governments and invariably vote and propose laws as instructed by their respective governments, meaning the states exert direct influence over federal politics.

== European Union ==
Since Germany is a member of the European Union, some of the powers the federal government constitutionally possesses are, in practice, exercised by EU institutions, namely by the European Parliament, the European Commission, the European Council, and the European Court of Justice. The EU policy areas, shared or exclusive, include, but are not limited to, monetary policy (Germany being a member of the Eurozone), environment, agriculture, foreign policy, internal market, customs union, and consumer protection. However, all of these powers were freely delegated to the EU by Germany (unlike in a federation where power is inherent and does not require delegation) and Germany remains sovereign and maintains the right to leave the union, therefore, the EU is not part of German federalism. Germany also maintains a large degree of control over EU policy through the European Council and its MEPs in the European Parliament.

== See also ==
- States of Germany
- Composition of the German state parliaments
- Politics of Germany
