= Hallein Salt Mine =

Salt mine in Austria

Coordinates: 47.667049°N 13.090339°E

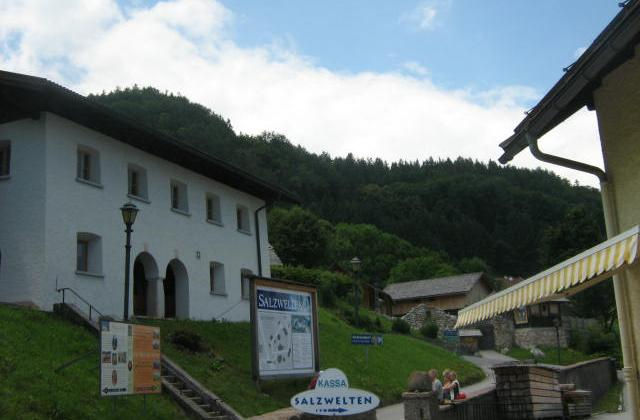
Entrance to Salt Mine

The Hallein Salt Mine, also known as Salzbergwerk Dürrnberg, is an underground salt mine located in the Dürrnberg plateau above Hallein, Austria. The mine has been worked for over 2600 years since the time of the Celtic tribes and earlier. It helped ensure nearby Salzburg would become a powerful trading community. Since World War I, it has served as a mining museum, known for its long wooden slides between levels.

== Description ==
There are several named tunnels in the mine, including the Obersteinberg opened in 1450, the Untersteinberg, the Jackobberg, the Rupertsberg, the Wolf Deitrich tunnel and the Dr. Nusko tunnels. They descend all of the way to Hallein.

Early mining was done by hand and extracted salt rock crystals as a solid. To improve efficiency, fresh water would be pumped into a cavern. After several weeks of absorbing salt from the walls, the water was pumped out to a processing plant in Hallein.

In 1829, the Bavarian–Austrian Salt Treaty was created, as the mine actually crosses under the border into Bavaria. The treaty stipulates that up to ninety Bavarian farmers are allowed to work in the mine.

== Scientific research ==
There has been scientific research which used ancient human feces found in the older tunnels to determine how resources were shared between cultures.

== Visiting ==
There is a 90-minute guided Salzwelten-tour which covers 1 kilometer. Visitors put on white coveralls to protect their clothes inside the mine. There is a 400 metres (1,300 ft) electric train ride into the mine which leads to two sets of 42 metres (138 ft) wooden slides. Visitors straddle two wooden rails and slide quickly down to the lower level of the mine. There is a boat trip across an underground lake before exiting the mine.

In 1969, there were 150,000 visitors to the mine. At that time, the tour covered 2.5 miles (4.0 km) and went down seven wooden slides.

== See also ==
- Dürrnberg
- Bavarian-Austrian Salt Treaty
