= Barmsteine =

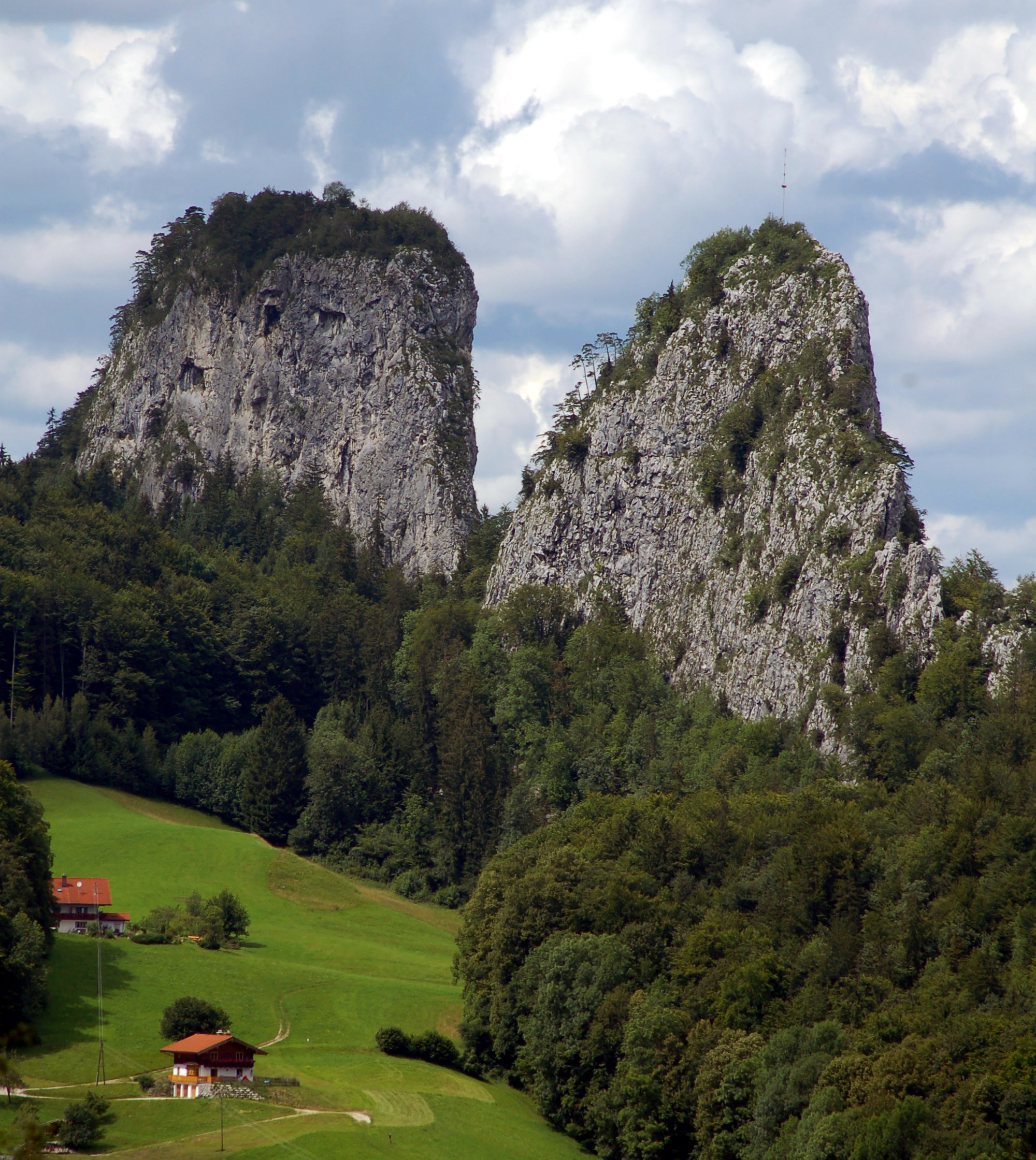
- Great (left) and Small Barmstein (840 m, right) seen from Dürrnberg.

Highest point
- Elevation: 851 m (2,792 ft)
- Coordinates: 47°41′12″N 13°04′19″E

Geography
- Location within Bavaria
- Location: Bavaria, Germany / Salzburg, Austria
- Parent range: Berchtesgaden Alps

Geology
- Mountain type: Barmstein limestone

The Barmsteine are two rock towers, 841 and 851 metres above sea level, in the northernmost part of the Hasel Mountains in the Bavarian Alps. They rise above the Austrian town of Hallein, and lie on the border between Salzburger Land in Austria and Berchtesgadener Land in Germany.

== Geology ==
Geologically, the pinnacles have given their name to the so-called Barmstein limestone (Barmsteinkalk), a turbidite sequence which is part of the Oberalm Formation in the Upper Jurassic rock layer.

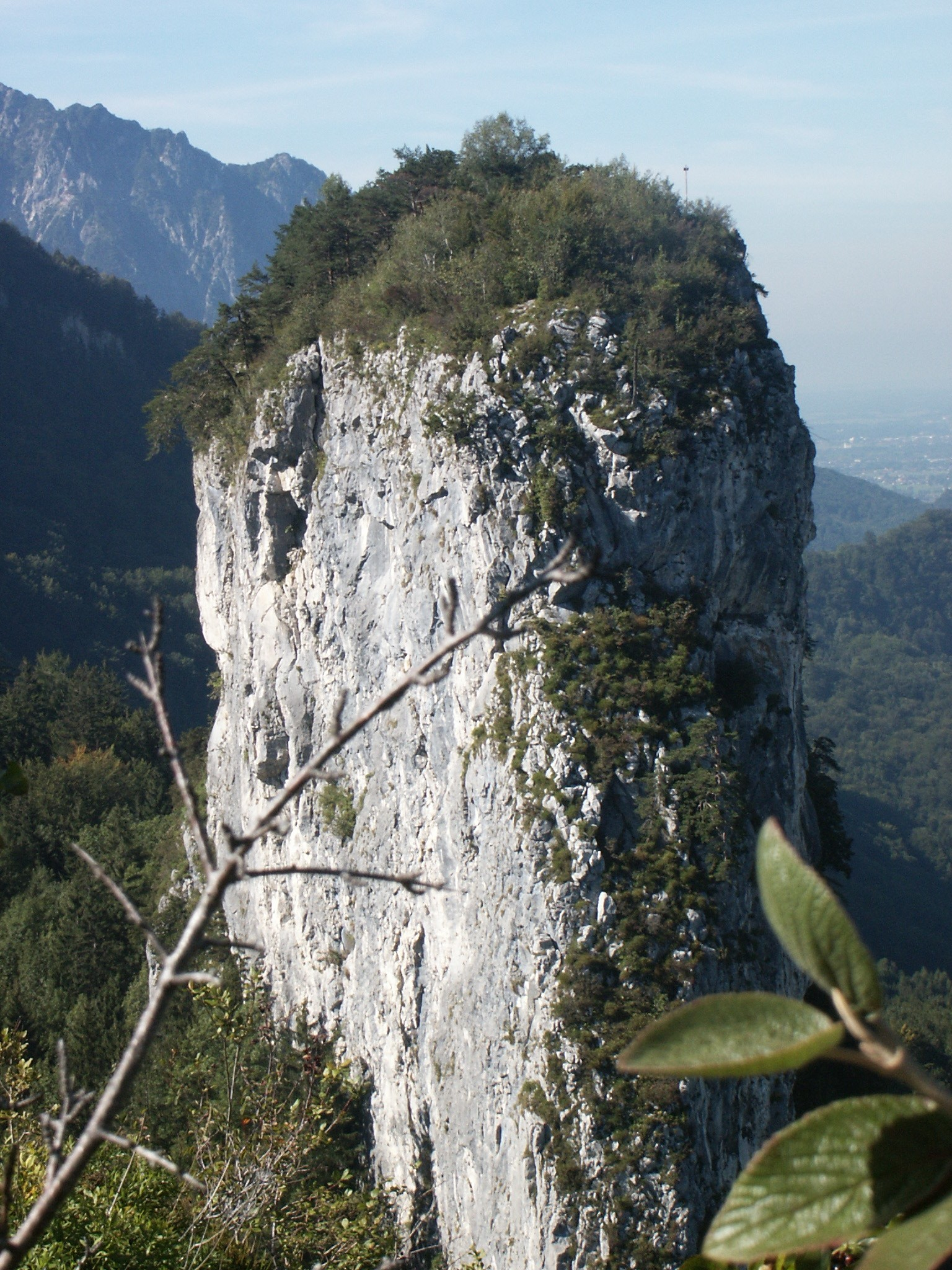
The Great Barmstein, right: Salzburg Land, left: Berchtesgaden Land

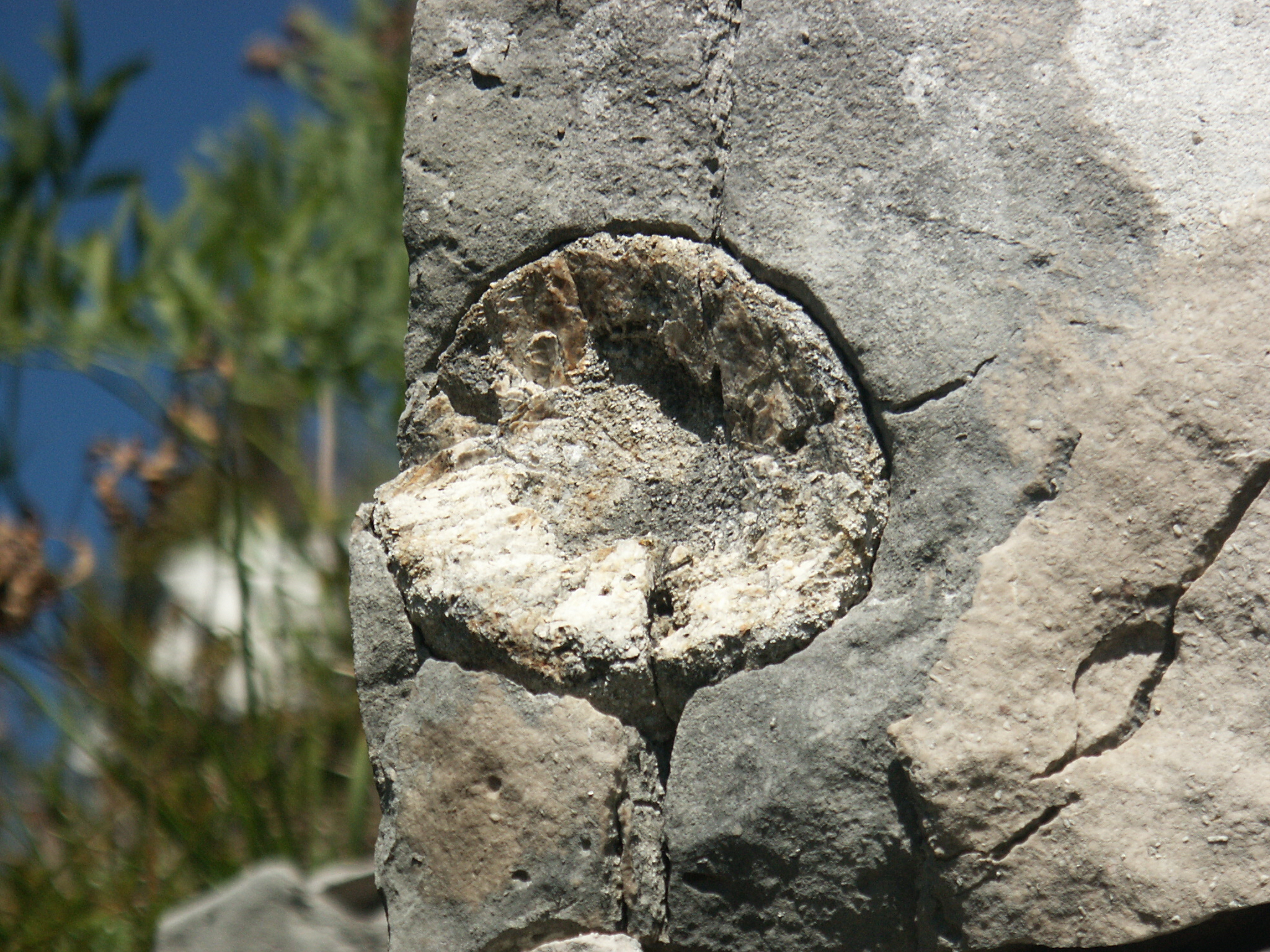
A rock insert on the Small Barmstein

== Climbing and walking ==
Both rock pinnacles are a popular destination, especially for climbers because they are lit by the sun until late in the evening and are easy to get to. The climbing grade of the Small Barmstein is II to III, the Great Barmstein is significantly harder. In addition to the two large pinnacles there are also the Katzenbarmsteine, on the southern arête of the Small Barmstein. Here there is also a boulder park. The Barmsteine may also be easily climbed using rock steps with railings and several places that are secured by cables. On the Small Barmstein this ascent (Note: .The traditional maypole erected on the Bavarian side is lifted up the rock face. – In: Zinnburg: Bad Dürrnberg, p. 40.) is on the south side. It should not be attempted by anyone suffering from vertigo. For walkers, the ruins of Thürndl Castle, just a little to the east, are also worth visiting.

In January 2008 the southern face of the Small Barmstein was put out of bounds to climbers by the owner, who built a fence here after numerous infringements of the climbing rules.

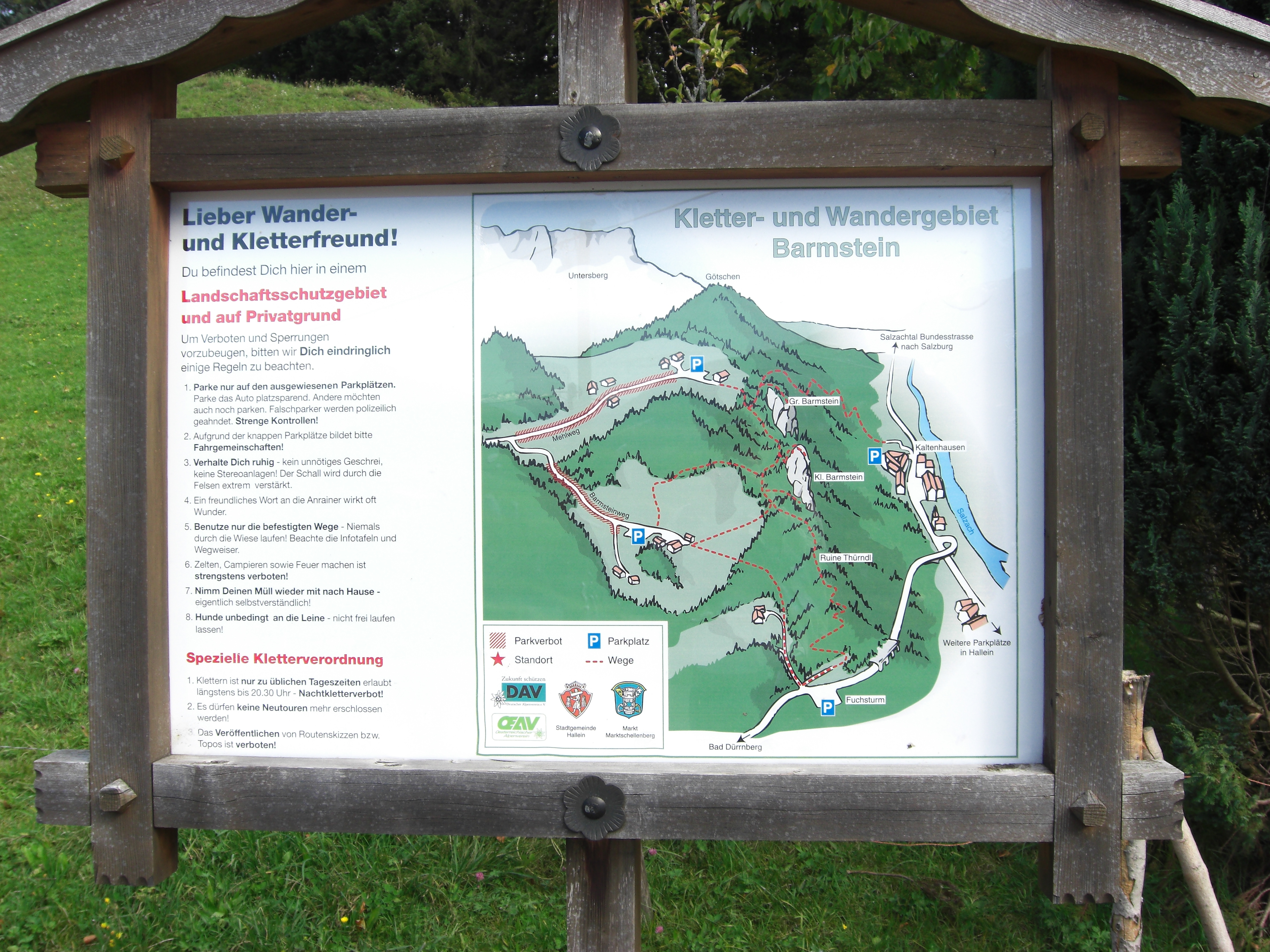
Notice board with climbing rules for the Barmstein

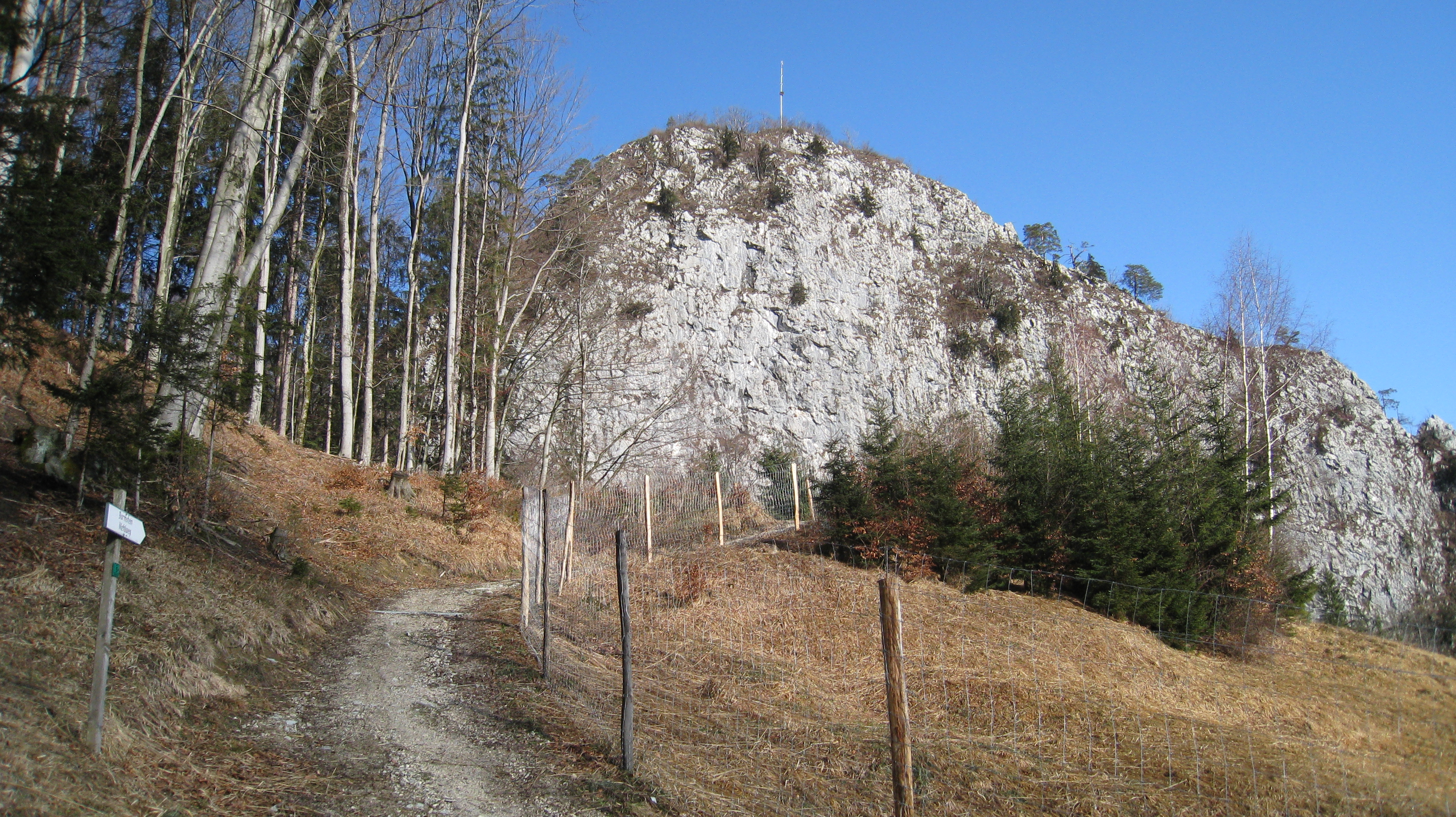
Fence placing the Small Barmstein out of bounds to climbers

== History ==
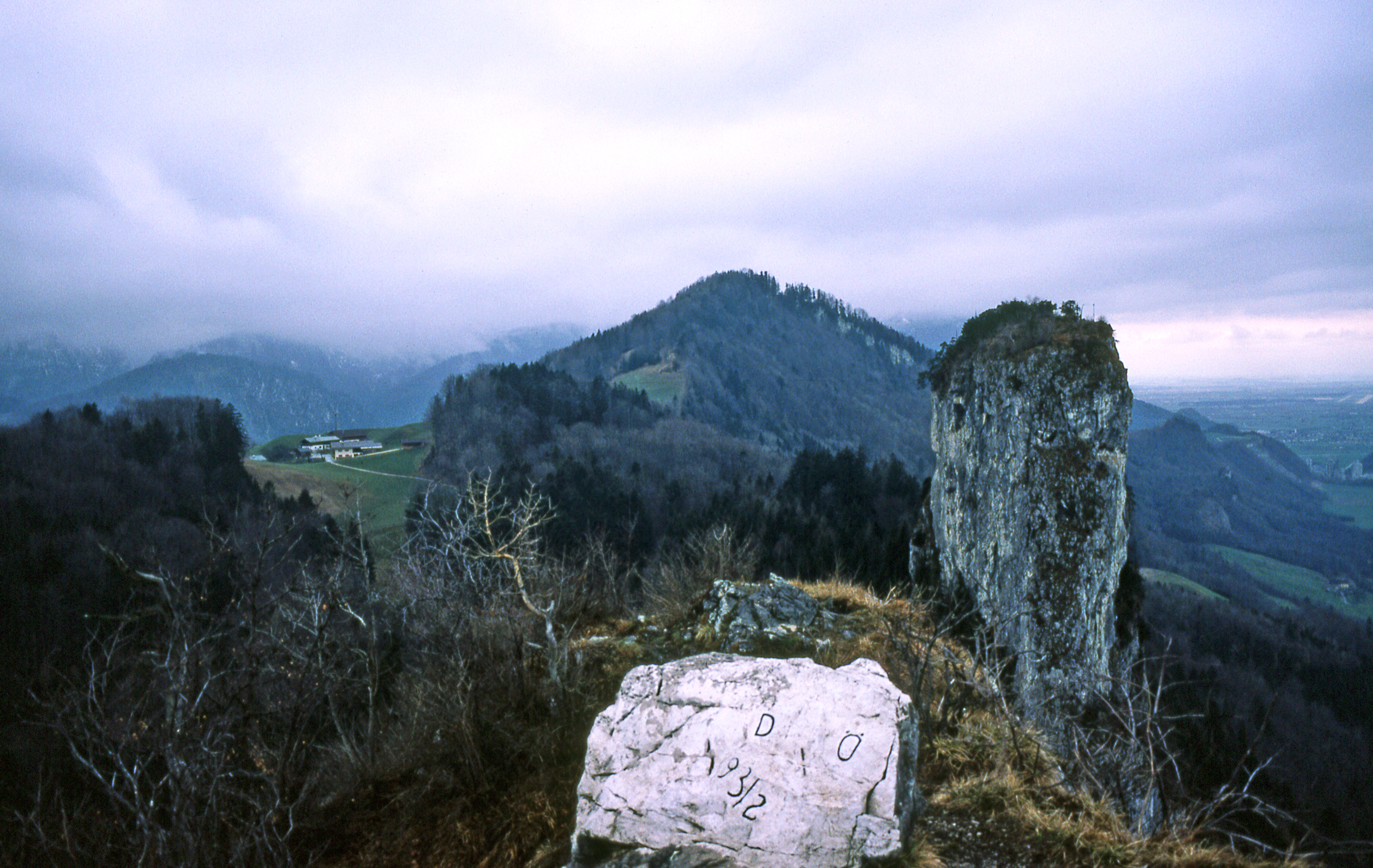
Small Barmstein, German-Austrian state border, border post no. 93/2 (1981) (Note: View of the Great Barmstein. – The house on the left-hand side of the photo is part of the Gnotschaft Mehlweg, Marktschellenberg.)

Galleries in the Barmsteine were used by the nearby brewery, Hofbräu Kaltenhausen, to store beer.

Even during the Nazi era the Barmsteine were visibly and invisibly used: in addition to the use of the hidden galleries as a site for the armaments industry, a large, white swastika was painted on the rocks so that it could be easily from the direction of Austria; this was even before the Anschluss of Austria to Germany. After the war it was removed and is no longer really visible today.

== Sources ==
- Zinnburg, Karl and Kurz, Franz (1980). Bad Dürrnberg. Kurverwaltung, Bad Dürrnberg.
- Plöchinger, Benno (1984) Zum Nachweis jurassisch-kretazischer Eingleitungen von Hallstätter Gesteinsmassen beiderseits des Salzach-Quertales (Salzburg). In: Geologische Vereinigung (Hrsg.): Geologische Rundschau. Vol 73. Springer, Berlin/Heidelberg, p. 293-304.
- Moosleitner, Gero (2004). Fossilien sammeln im Salzburger Land. Ein Führer zu klassischen und neuen Fundstellen. 1. Auflage. Edition Goldschneck, Wiebelsheim, ISBN 3-494-01374-8 (see p. 29 and 149 on the two rocks and Barmstein limestone).
