= Johann Baptist Wichtlhuber =

German-born 19th century Austrian clergyman

Johann Baptist Wichtlhuber (June 18, 1793 in Palling, Germany – April 14, 1872 in Hallein, Austria) was a dean and pastor in the city of Hallein as well as honorary citizen of this city.

== Life ==
He was accepted into the seminary of the Archdiocese of Salzburg in 1815 and ordained a priest on June 11, 1816. On September 10, 1819 he was hired as an assistant priest in St. Michael in Lungau. Since February 7, 1821, he worked as an assistant priest in Hallein, from 1847 he worked as a dean and pastor. On February 19, 1860, Wichtlhuber donated a flag with the city arms of Hallein to the civic guard.

== Honors ==
On June 2, 1851, Wichtlhuber was appointed to the clergy, and on June 8, 1866, to the honored capitular of Salzburg. The city of Hallein awarded him an honorary citizenship diploma.

On the occasion of the 50th jubilee of the priesthood on June 24, 1866, he was granted honorary citizenship of the city of Hallein on February 16, 1866 "for his services to the support and catering for poor children and the foundation of legacies for the infant custody and boys' school".

The Wichtlhuberstrasse (Wichtlhuber street) in Hallein was named after him.

== Writings ==
Geschichte des Ursprunges und der Bestimmung der drey goldenen Samstag-Nächte: nebst einigen Gebethen und Andachtsübungen zur würdigen und nützlichen Heiligung derselben, Duyle, Salzburg 1826
