= Hallein =

- Municipality
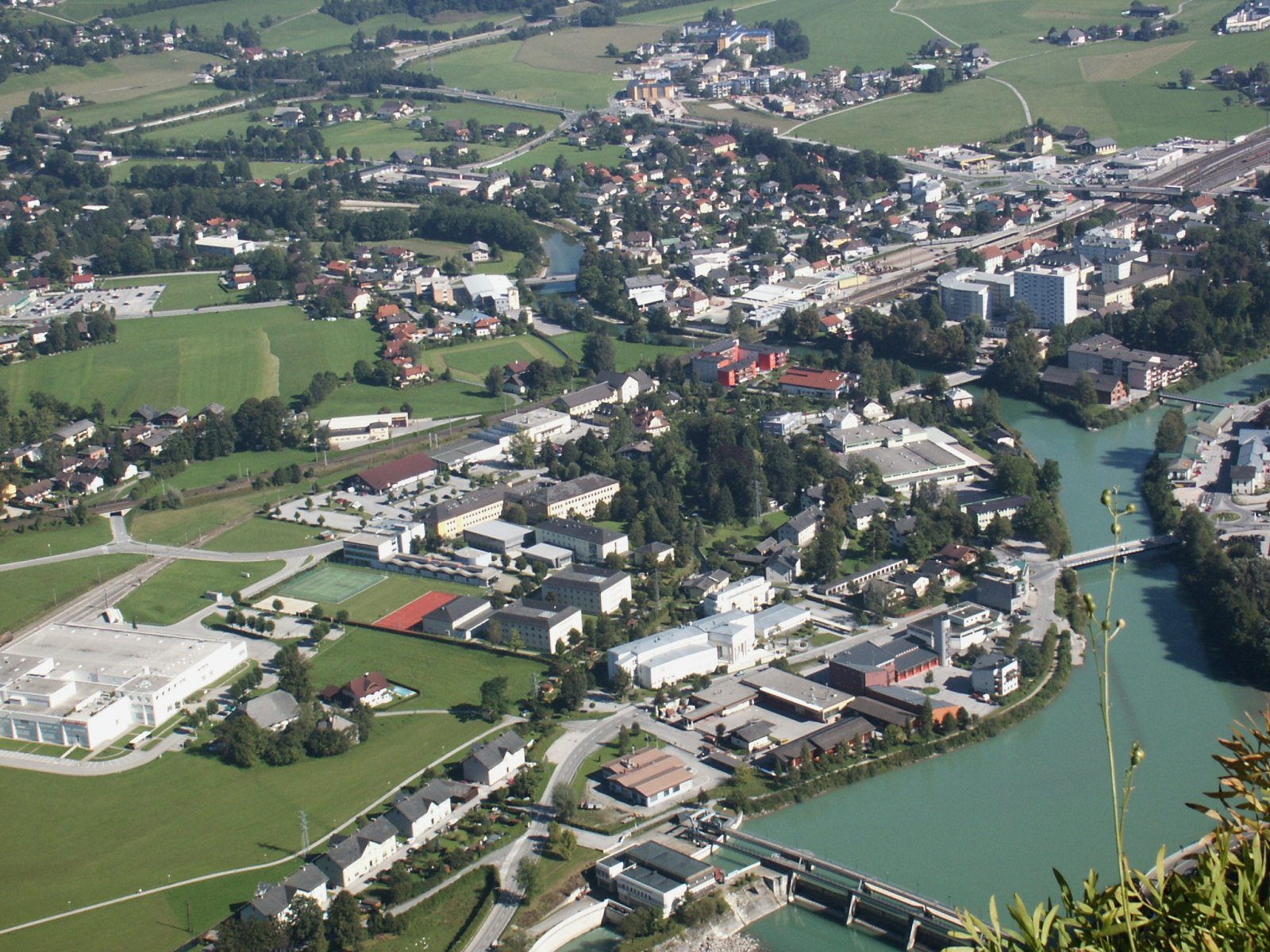

- Coat of arms

- Location within Salzburg State; Location within Austria Hallein (Austria)
- Coordinates: 47°40′59″N 13°05′49″E
- Country: Austria
- State: Salzburg
- District: Hallein

Government
  - Mayor: Alexander Stangassinger (SPÖ)

Area
  - Total: 26.98 km^{2} (10.42 sq mi)
- Elevation: 447 m (1,467 ft)

Population (2018-01-01)
  - Total: 21,150
  - Density: 783.9/km^{2} (2,030/sq mi)
- Time zone: UTC+1 (CET)
  - Summer (DST): UTC+2 (CEST)
- Postal code: 5400
- Area code: 06245
- Vehicle registration: HA
- Website: Official website

Hallein (German pronunciation: [ˈhalaɪ̯n]) is a historic town in the Austrian state of Salzburg. It is the capital of Hallein district.

== Geography ==
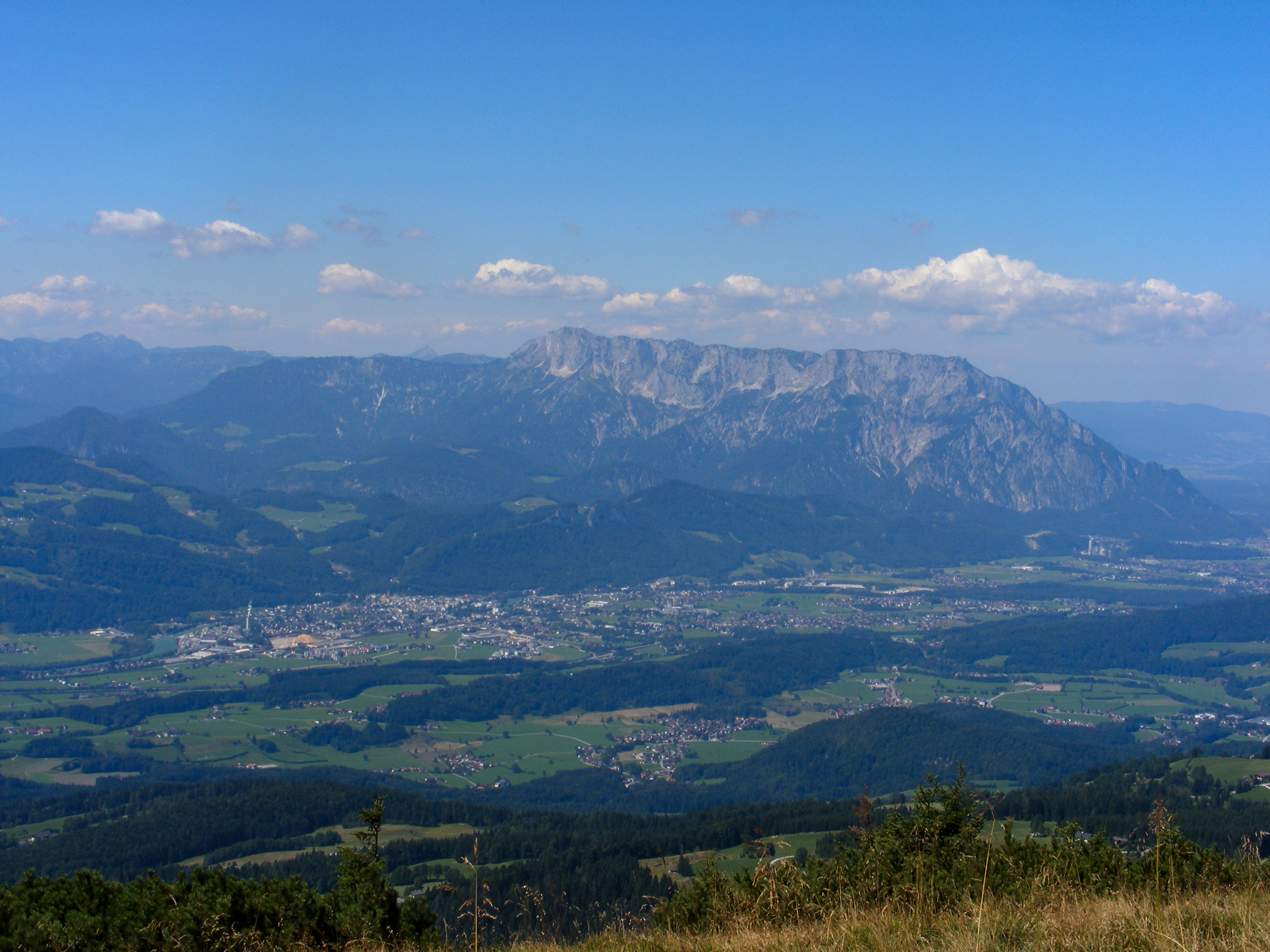
Salzach valley with Hallein, view to Untersberg massif

The town is located in the Tennengau region south of the City of Salzburg, stretching along the Salzach river in the shadow of the Untersberg massif, close to the border with Germany in the west. With a population of about 21,150, Hallein is the second largest town of the Salzburg state. The municipal area comprises the cadastral communities of Adnet II, Au, Burgfried, Dürrnberg, Gamp, Gries, Hallein proper, Oberalm II, and Taxach.

Hallein can be reached by suburban S-Bahn railway from the city of Salzburg. It has also access to the A 10 Tauern Autobahn (European route E55) from Salzburg to Villach.

== History ==
Long known for the Hallein Salt Mine in the Dürrnberg plateau, settling in the area have been traced 4000 years back. It was a Celtic community from 600 BCE until the Romans took over their Noricum kingdom in 15 BCE.

In the mid 8th century AD, Duke Tassilo III of Bavaria granted the estates to the Salzburg diocese; from 987 they were held by St Peter's Abbey. The extraction of salt became crucial for the economic wealth of the Archbishopric of Salzburg, competing with the salt production of Reichenhall in Bavaria.

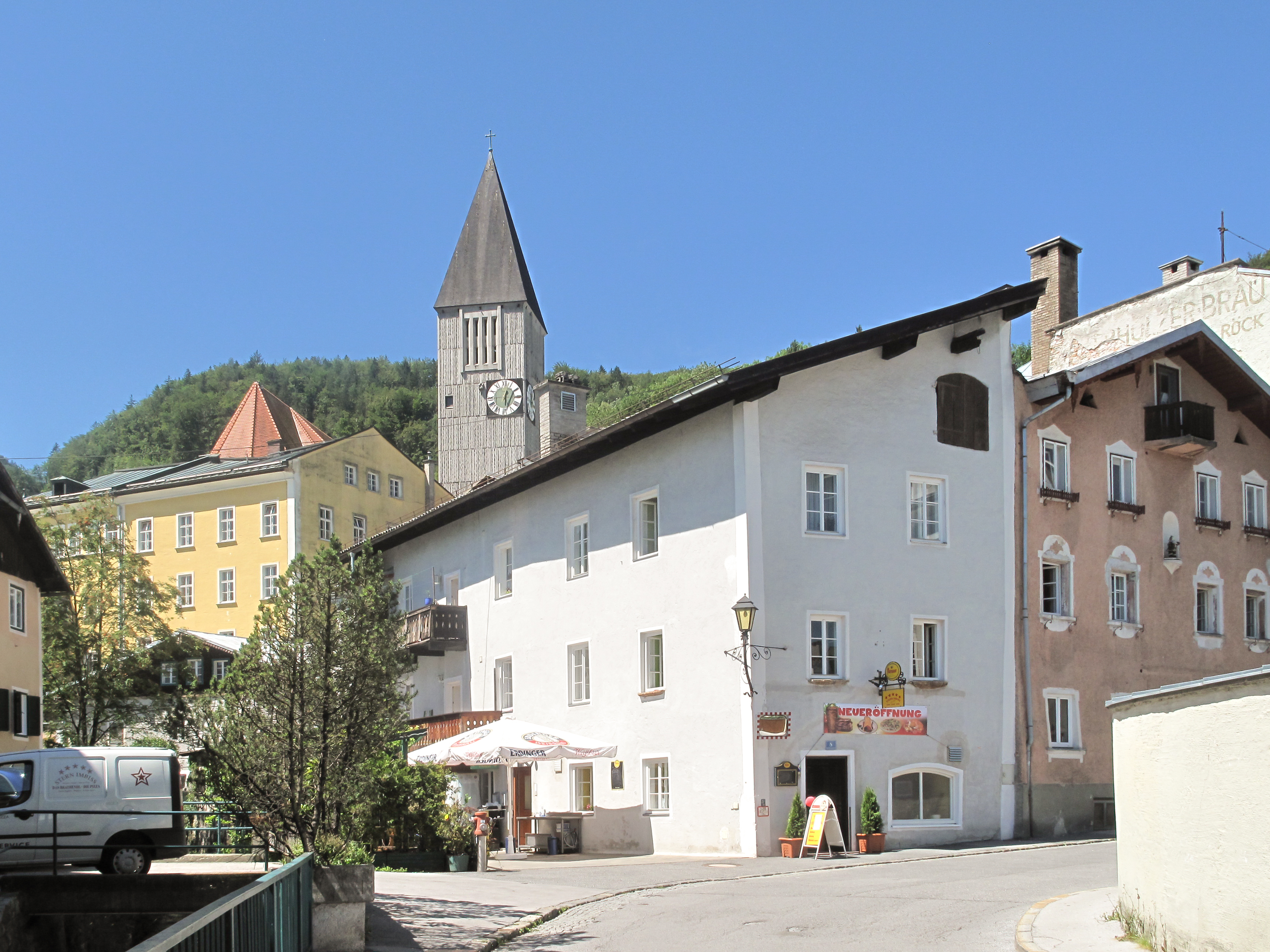
Street and church tower

Salt mining at the site was first mentioned in an 1198 deed. The name Hallein is documented since the early 13th century; it is one of many Hall-names in the south German language area that may have something to do with salt and for which Celtic, Germanic and other origins have been discussed.

From the 15th century onwards, beer brewing became common in Hallein. In 1489 Prince-Archbishop Leonhard von Keutschach in 1489 acquired a large brewery, whereafter the sale of Hofbräu Kaltenhausen beers became another main source of revenue for the Salzburg archbishopric. At the end of the 17th century, Prince-Archbishop Kuenburg had the Protestant miners expelled, after which several hundred of them emigrated to Walcheren and Zeelandic Flanders in the Dutch Republic. With the former prince-archbishopric, Hallein became part of the Austrian Empire by 1816. The Kaltenhausen brewery was purchased by Archduchess Maria Leopoldine of Austria-Este and became one of the largest Salzburg operations during the 19th century.

In World War II, Hallein was the site of a work camp annex to the Dachau concentration camp. After the war, it was the site of a permanent Displaced Persons camp (Beth Israel). In mid-1947, ORT opened a school in two of the barracks, teaching tailoring, dressmaking, electrical and radio technology, baking, beautician training, and upholstery to over 200 students. Later ORT also offered English language classes. In 1948, with the closure of other DP camps, Hallein became the Austrian collection point for Jewish emigrees to Canada and the United States. The inmates even established a football team named Hakoah Hallein, coached by Heinrich Schönfeld. The camp closed in 1954.

Largest groups of foreign residents
Nationality	Population (2026)
Bosnia and Herzegovina	1,060
Turkey	1,048
Germany	763
Croatia	358
Serbia	290
Romania	235
North Macedonia	225
Hungary	197
Bulgaria	189
Syria	185
Ukraine	103
Afghanistan	88
Slovenia	83
Italy	76
Poland	57
Russian Federation	52
Kosovo	48
Slovakia	31
Czech Republic	30
Iran	19
Iraq	7

== Culture ==
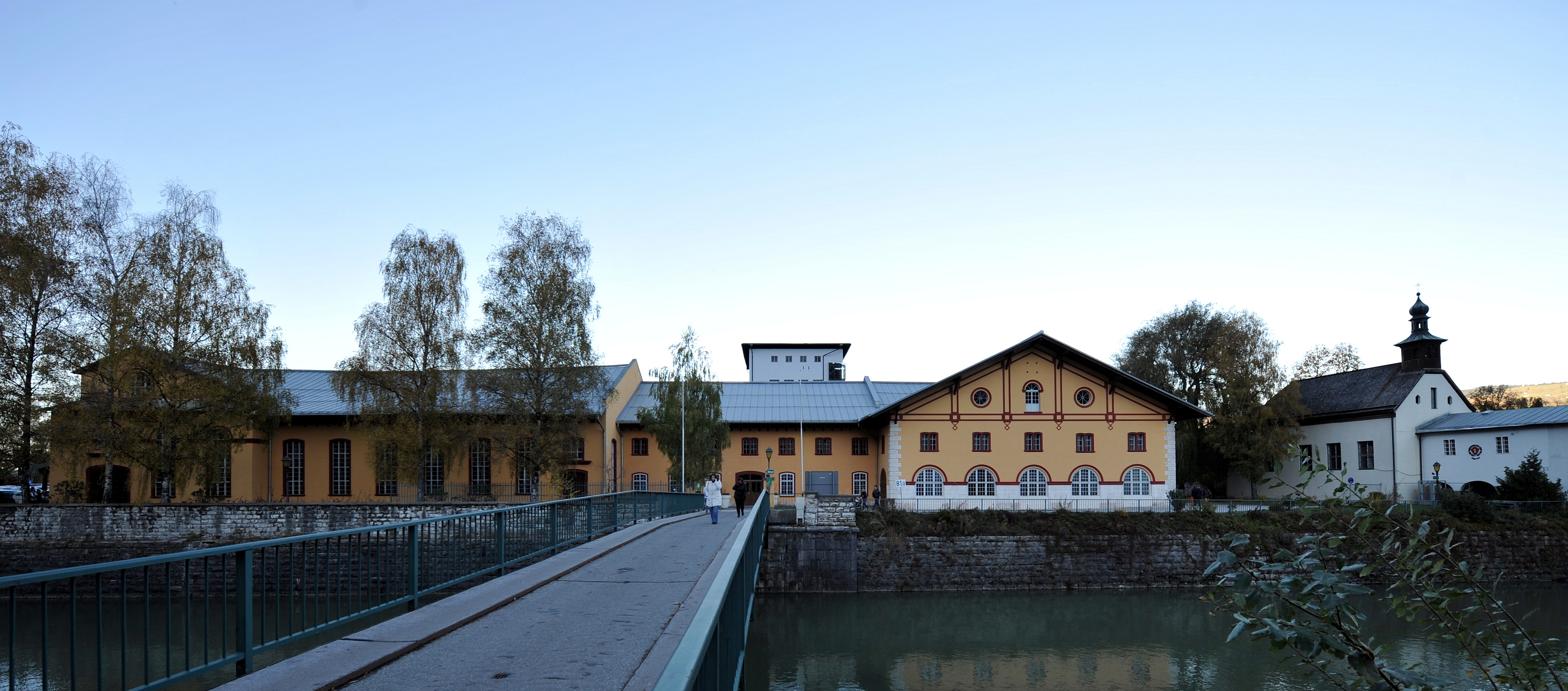
Old saltworks on Perner Island, today a venue of the Salzburg Festival

Hallein hosts two museums of historic and musical interest. The Keltenmuseum displays artifacts and narrative describing the early Hallstatt and La Tene Celtic cultures as well as the development of salt mining in the region through the Middle Ages and Renaissance. The Silent Night Museum features information relating to the composing of one of the best-known Christmas songs of the 19th century. It documents the life and times of composer Franz Xaver Gruber. The museum houses the guitar originally used by lyricist Joseph Mohr and several signed copies of the sheet music.

== Politics ==
Seats in the municipal assembly (Gemeinderat) as of 2019 elections:

- Social Democratic Party of Austria (SPÖ): 9
- Austrian People's Party (ÖVP): 9
- Freedom Party of Austria (FPÖ): 3
- The Greens: 3
- NEOS – The New Austria and Liberal Forum: 1

== Notable people ==
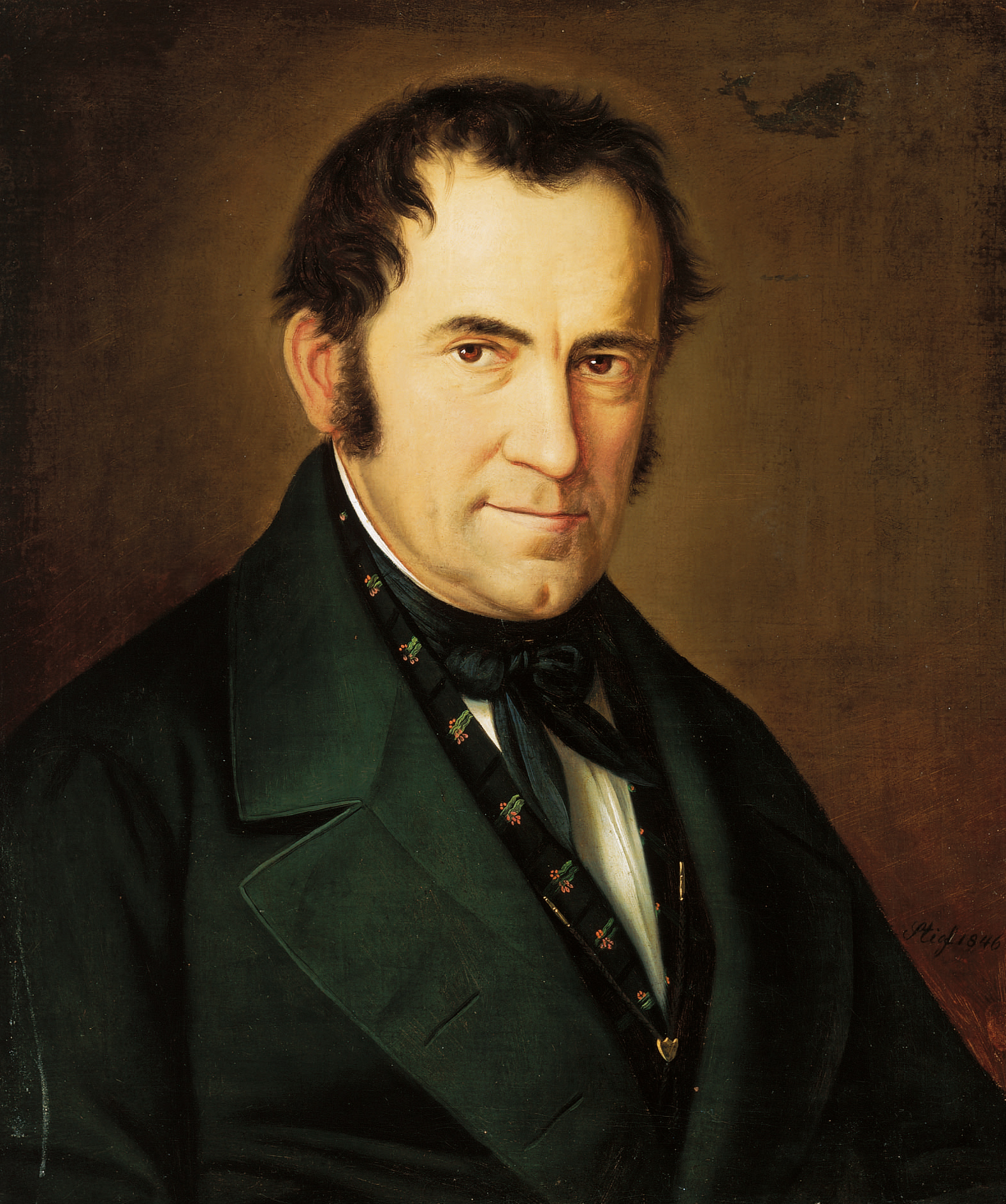
Franz Xaver Gruber, 1846

- Johann Georg Mohr, (DE Wiki) (1656-1726), Baroque sculptor, "Hall One Master"; died locally
- Franz Xaver Gruber (1787-1863), composer of Silent Night, Holy Night, lived locally
- Johann Baptist Wichtlhuber (1793–1872), Catholic priest and dean, known for caring for poor children in Hallein
- August Schenk (1815-1891), botanist and paleobotanist.
- Herbert Fux (1927-2007), actor and politician,
- Manfred Baumann, (DE Wiki) (born 1956), journalist, author, comedian and ORF editor

=== Sport ===
- Gerhard Breitenberger (born 1954), football player, played 253 games and 15 for Austria
- Thomas Stangassinger (born 1965), former skier, gold medallist at the 1994 Winter Olympics
- Judith Wiesner (born 1966), former tennis player
- Herbert Ilsanker (born 1967), former football player
- Michael Wildner (born 1970), former middle-distance runner
- Sanel Kuljić (born 1977), grew up in Hallein, football player, played over 290 games and 20 for Austria
- Stefan Ilsanker (born 1989), football player, played 387 games and 61 for Austria
- Marcel Hirscher (born 1989), former alpine skier, twice a gold medallist at the 2018 Winter Olympics
- Anna Veith (born 1989), alpine ski racer, gold medallist in Alpine skiing at the 2014 Winter Olympics

== See also ==
- Dürrnberg
- Bavarian-Austrian Salt Treaty
