= Bavarian–Austrian Salt Treaty =

1829 treaty between Bavaria and Austria

The Bavarian–Austrian Salt Treaty of 1829 (German: Konvention zwischen Bayern und Österreich über die beiderseitigen Salinenverhältnisse vom 18. März 1829, short Salinenkonvention) is the oldest European treaty still in effect. It was signed by the Kingdom of Bavaria (now the Free State of Bavaria) and the Austrian Empire (now the Republic of Austria). It gave the Austrians the right to mine in Bavaria in exchange for wood. An agreement to this effect had already existed for 600 years, and was formally regulated by a treaty from 1829. The treaty was revised on 25 March 1957.

== See also ==
- Hallein Salt Mine
