= Eissee =

- Lower Eissee; Upper Eissee
- Unterer Eissee (German); Oberer Eissee (German)
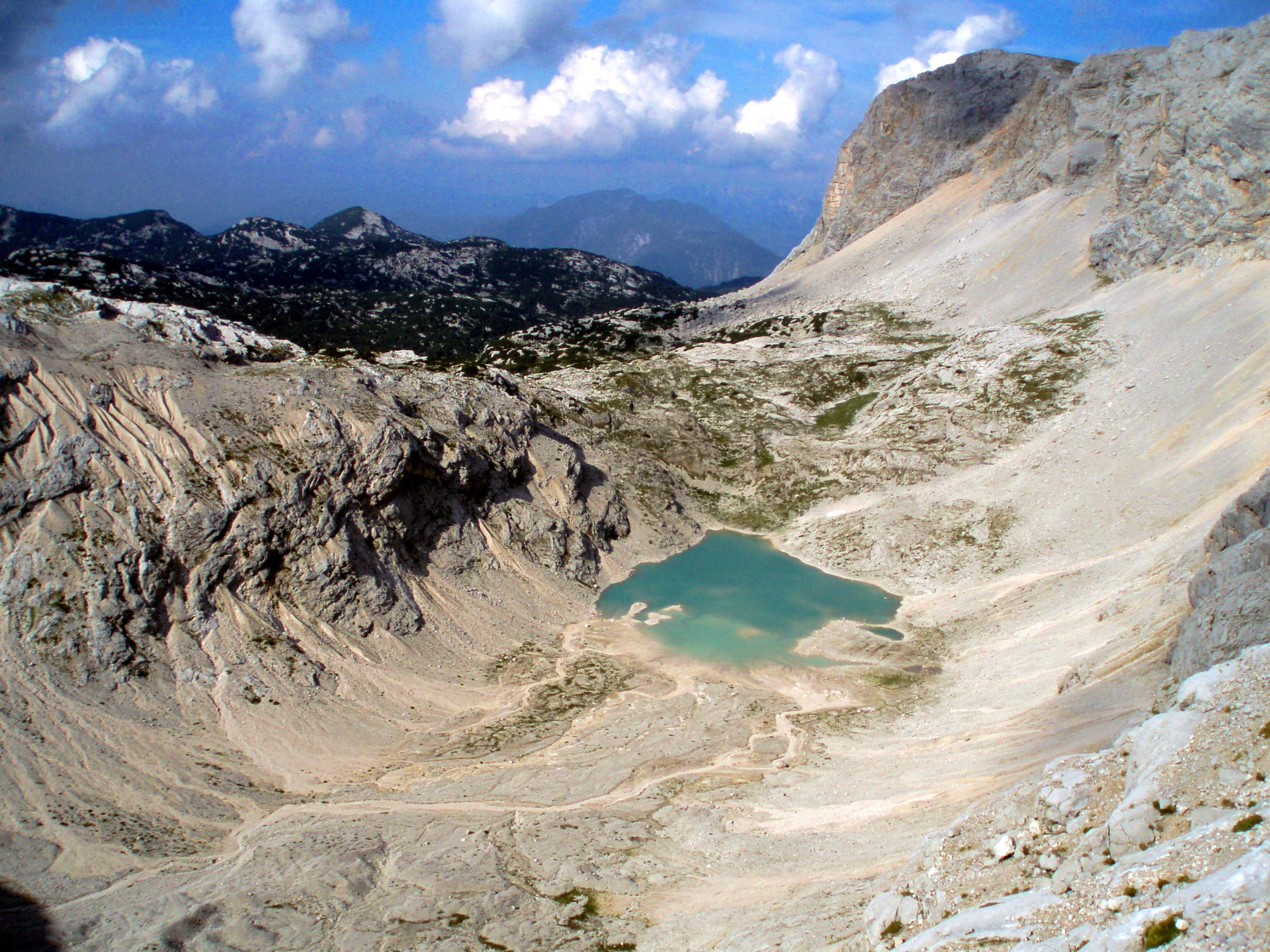
- View of the Lower Eissee. To the right rear is Taubenkogel

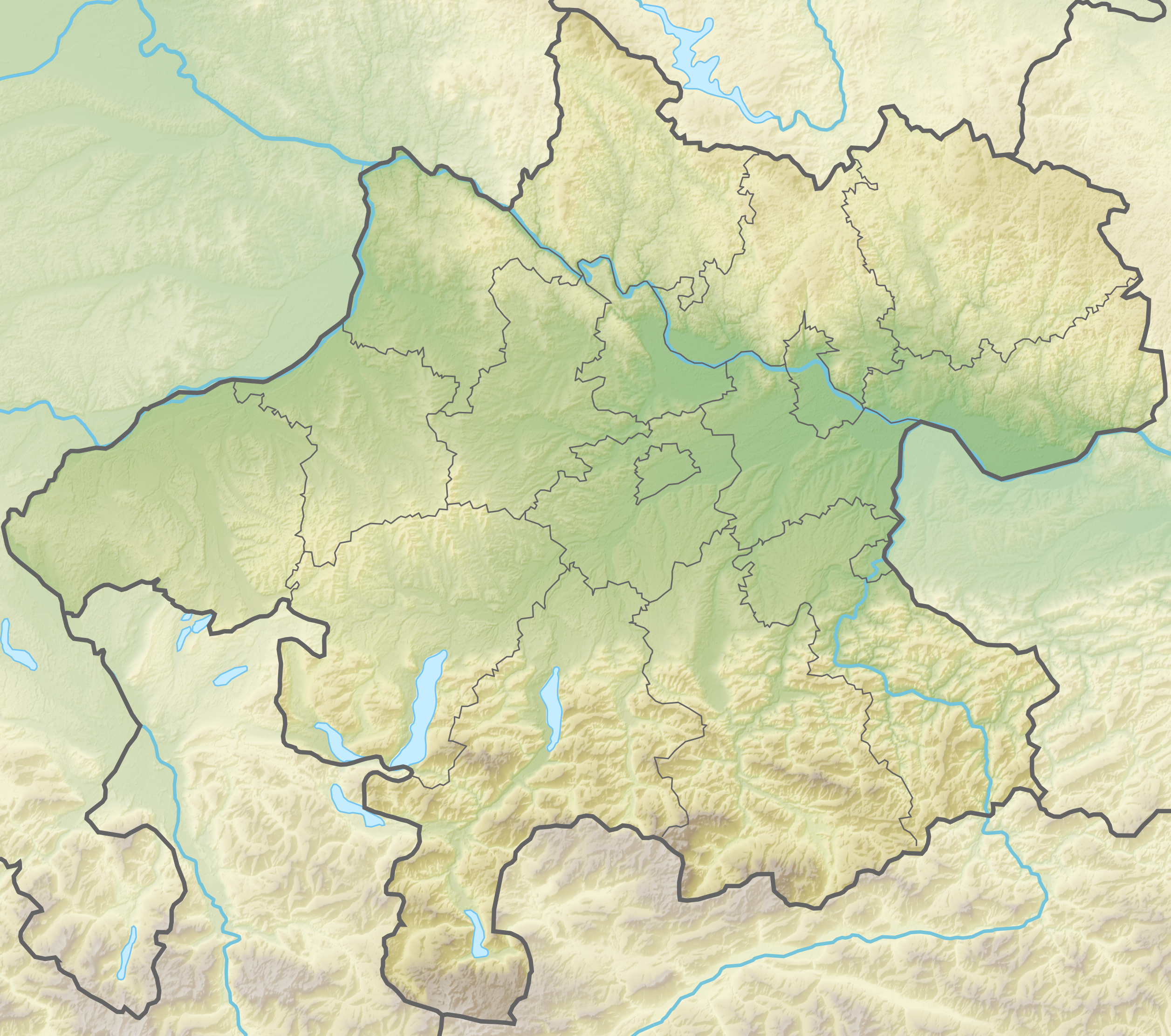
- Location within Upper Austria Location within Austria
- Location: Upper Austria
- Coordinates: 47°29′50″N 13°38′17″E
- Type: Lakes
- Part of: Dachstein Mountains
- Primary inflows: Ice melt
- Basin countries: Austria
- Max. length: Upper: 100 m (330 ft)
- Max. width: Upper: 50 m (160 ft)
- Max. depth: Upper: 10 m (33 ft)
- Surface elevation: Lower: 1,909 m (6,263 ft) Upper: 2,100 m (6,900 ft)
- Sections/sub-basins: 3

The Upper and Lower Eissee are two lakes in the Dachstein Mountains in the Austrian state of Upper Austria. They lie north of a 2,794 metres (9,167 ft) high mountain, the Gjaidstein, at an elevation of around 2,000 metres (6,600 ft).

== Lower Eissee ==
The Lower Eissee (German: Unterer Eissee) lies at 1,909 m (AA) in a shallow cirque, the Taubenkar. It was left behind by the melting of the Hallstätter Glacier that, until the middle of the 19th century, still extended as far as the doline of the upper Taubenkar. When the glacier retreated (today its snout lies at about 2,200 metres [7,200 ft]), the Lower Eissee was left behind in the basin, because the moraine gravel is lined with limestone silt. For a long time after it had been formed, roughly to the turn of the century, large fields of dead ice could be found on its shores, but today they have disappeared. The Lower Eissee has neither aboveground headwaters nor tailwaters.

== Upper Eissee ==
The Upper Eissee (Oberer Eissee) lies about 700 metres (2,300 ft) west of the Lower Eissee at a height of some 2,100 metres (6,900 ft) below the Simony Hut and the Dachstein Chapel. It was formed by the continued retreat of the glacier during the 20th century. In 1921 the ice had retreated so far that a small lake formed at its foot. This rapidly grew in size as a result of further melting until it measured about 100 by 50 metres (330 by 160 ft) and was up to 10 metres (33 ft) deep, but subsequently shrank again to only a fifth of this size due to the climate conditions. In 1951 it covered an area of 4 hectares (9.9 acres); at that time the glacier was still calving into the lake. Since then the ice has retreated well away from the lakeshore. The Upper Eissee has now split into three smaller lakes as a result of silting up.
