= Taubenkogel =

Mountain in Austria

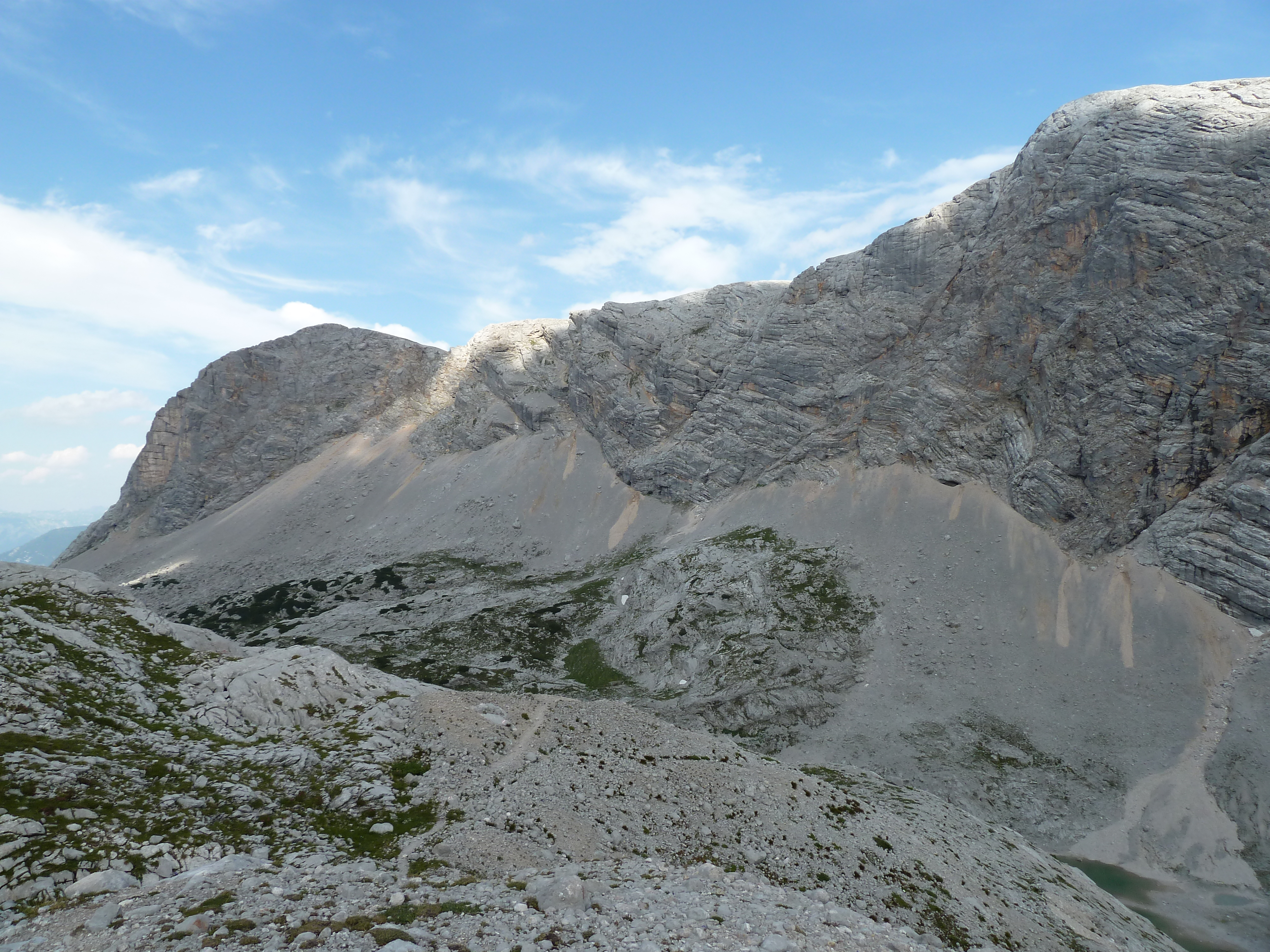
- View of the Taubenkogel

Highest point
- Elevation: 2,301 m (AA) (7,549 ft)
- Coordinates: 47°30′15″N 13°38′50″E

Geography
- Location within Austria
- Location: Upper Austria, Austria
- Parent range: Dachstein Mountains

Geology
- Mountain type: Limestone

Climbing
- Normal route: From the Gjaidalm

The Taubenkogel is a 2,301-metre (7,549 ft) high peak in the Dachstein Mountains of Upper Austria, northeast of the Hallstätter Glacier. It can be reached from the summit station of the Dachstein Cable Car on the Gjaidalm or from the Simony Hut.

In good weather, the Hoher Dachstein, the Gjaidstein, and the Hallstätter Glacier are visible from the summit.

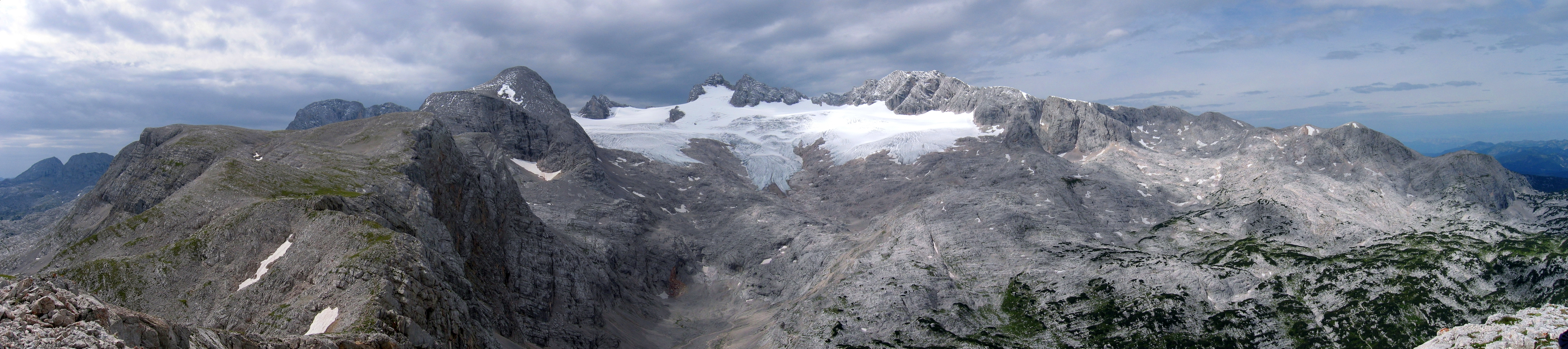
View from the Taubenkogel over the central peaks of the group
