= Simony Hut =

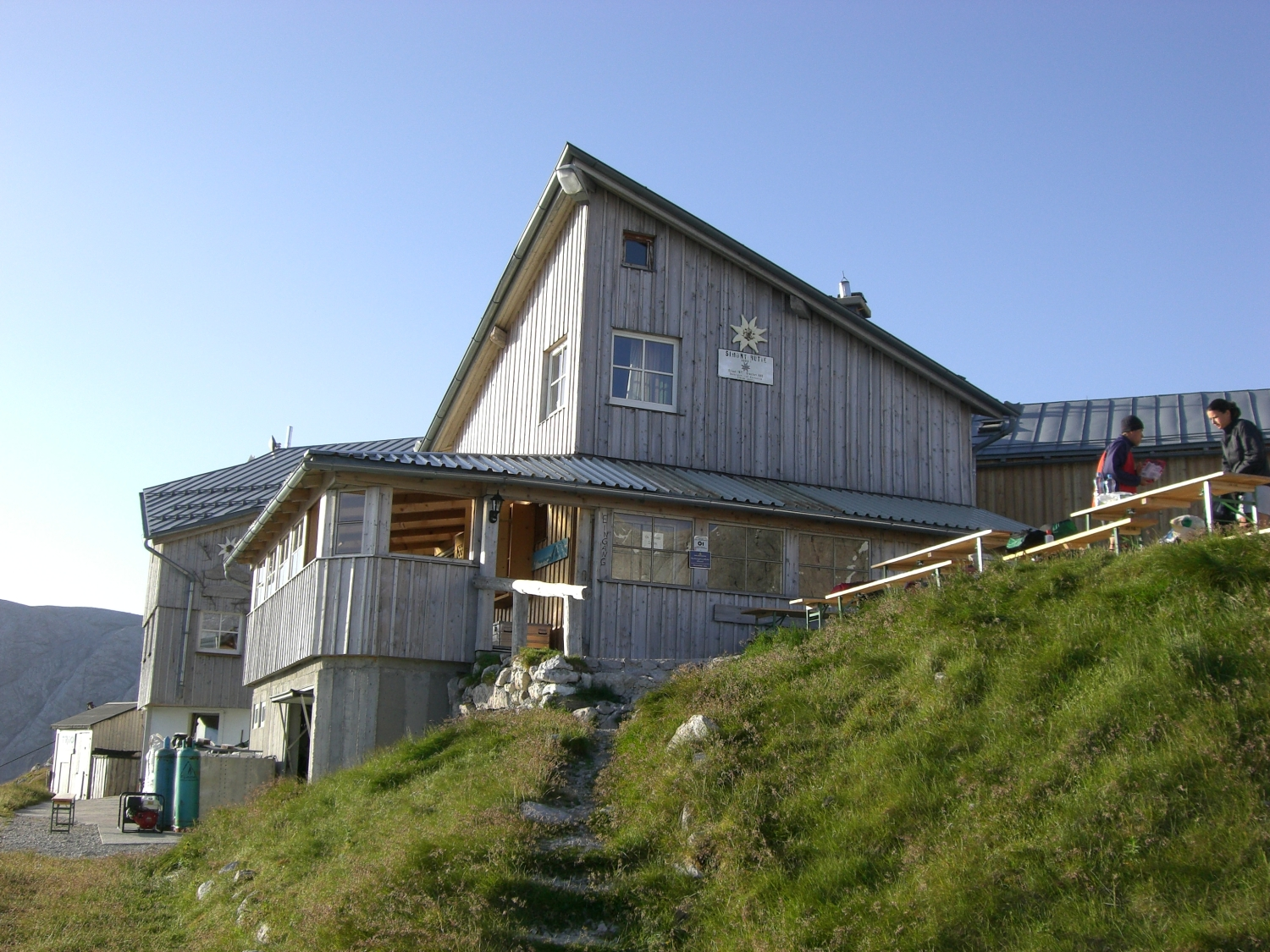
- Interactive map of the Simony Hut area

General information
- Location: foot of the Hoher Dachstein
- Coordinates: 47°30′2″N 13°37′25″E
- Elevation: 2,205 m (7,234 ft)
- Owner: Austrian branch of the ÖAV

Website
- www.simonyhuette.at

The Simony Hut (German: Simonyhütte) is an Alpine club hut belonging to the Austrian Alpine Club (OeAV) located at a height of 2,205 metres, just below the Hallstätter Glacier at the foot of the Hoher Dachstein in Austria. The hut, named after Friedrich Simony, the first person to ascend Hoher Dachstein, is situated high above Hallstatt in the northern part of the Dachstein Mountains. It is open year-round and, in winter, offers numerous options for ski tours and snowshoeing.

The Simony Hut is an important base for climbers because they are able to set out from here on long tours over the Dachsteins. There is also a mountaineering school where training courses are run for glacier or ice climbing. The Dachstein Chapel is nearby.

== History ==
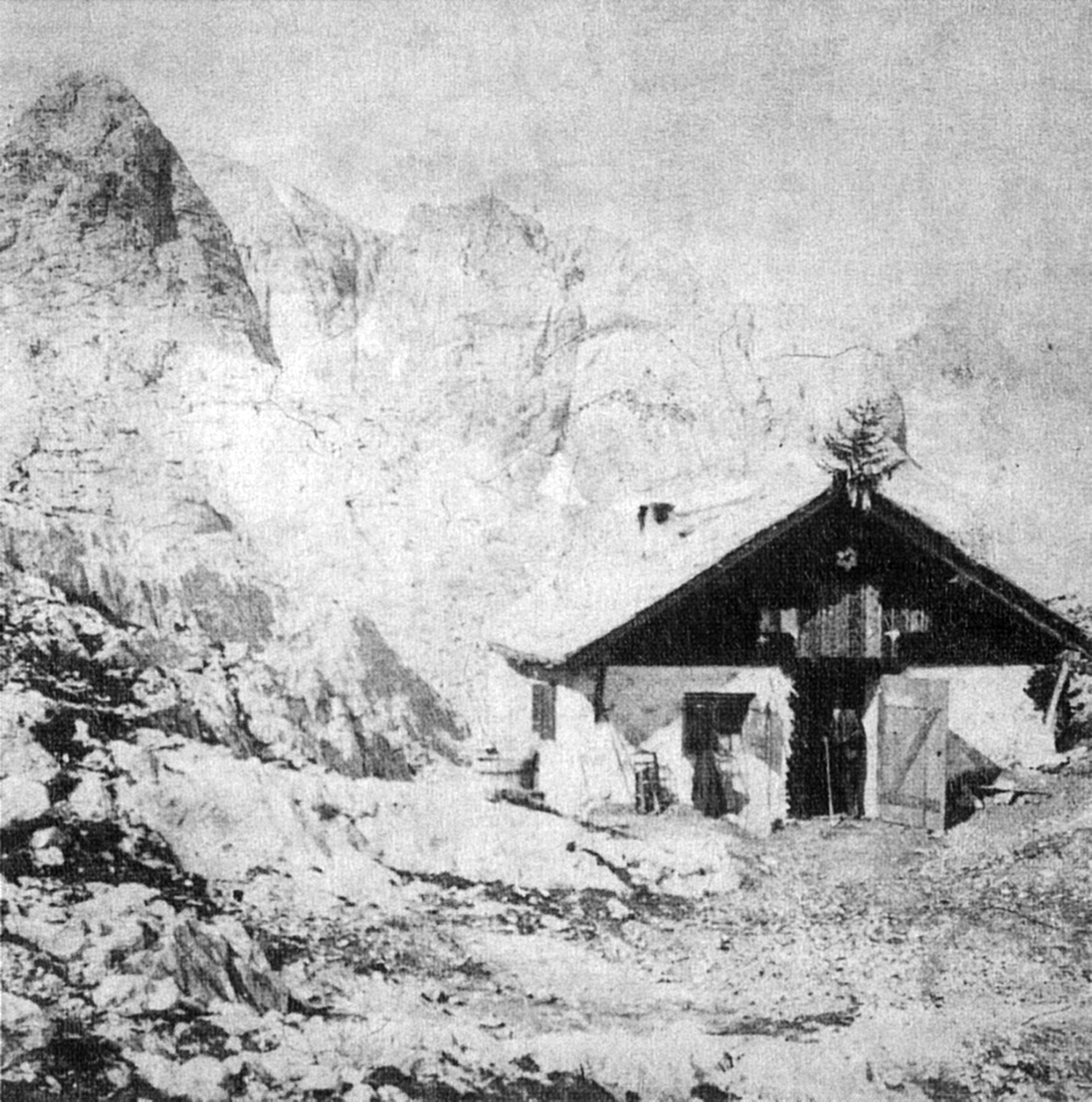
Photograph of the first hut (Friedrich Simony 1877).

In 1843 a stone rest and emergency shelter, known as "Hotel Simony", was opened just below the site of the present hut.

In 1876, Friedrich Simony selected the present location himself for construction of the first free-standing wooden building. The opening ceremony was held on 18 August 1877. Over the next decade, the hut became a popular destination for climbers. The structure was enlarged between 1891 and 1893 to compensate for the increasing numbers of visitors. Further work was carried out between 1922 and 1933, and the hut underwent a general restoration in 1953. No further alterations were made to the original structure after the last major renovations between 1961 and 1963, when a power supply was also added.

In 1977, the Simony Hut celebrated its centenary as a climbing and alpine training centre. In 1989 a biological treatment plant was opened to treat human waste (upgraded in 1998). A large modern annex was opened in July 1999.

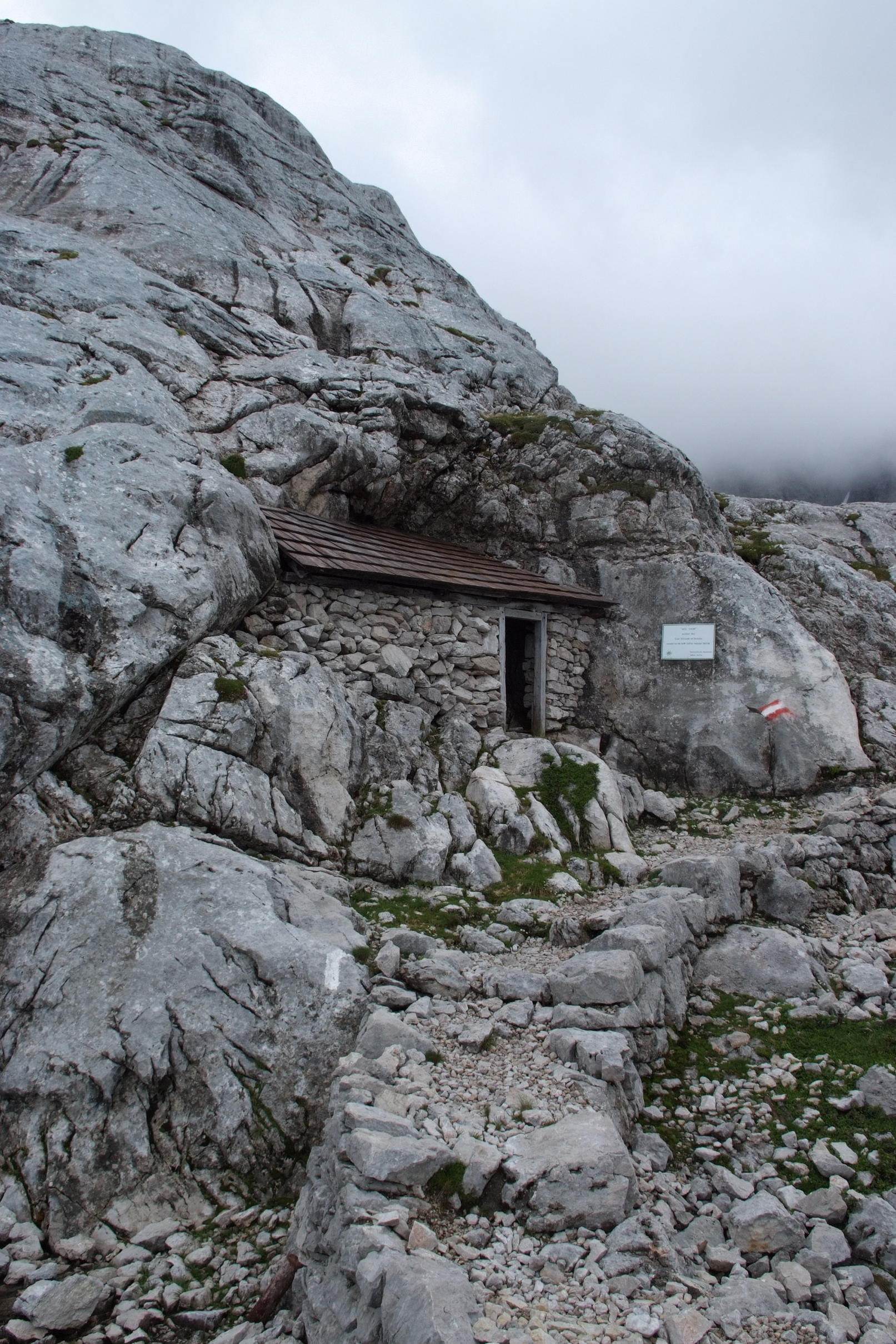
The "Hotel Simony" (July 2009).

As the Simony Hut lies near the Hallstätter Glacier, most routes require knowledge of glacier crossing with appropriate equipment. The only exceptions are the paths to the Wiesberg House and the Gjaidalm.

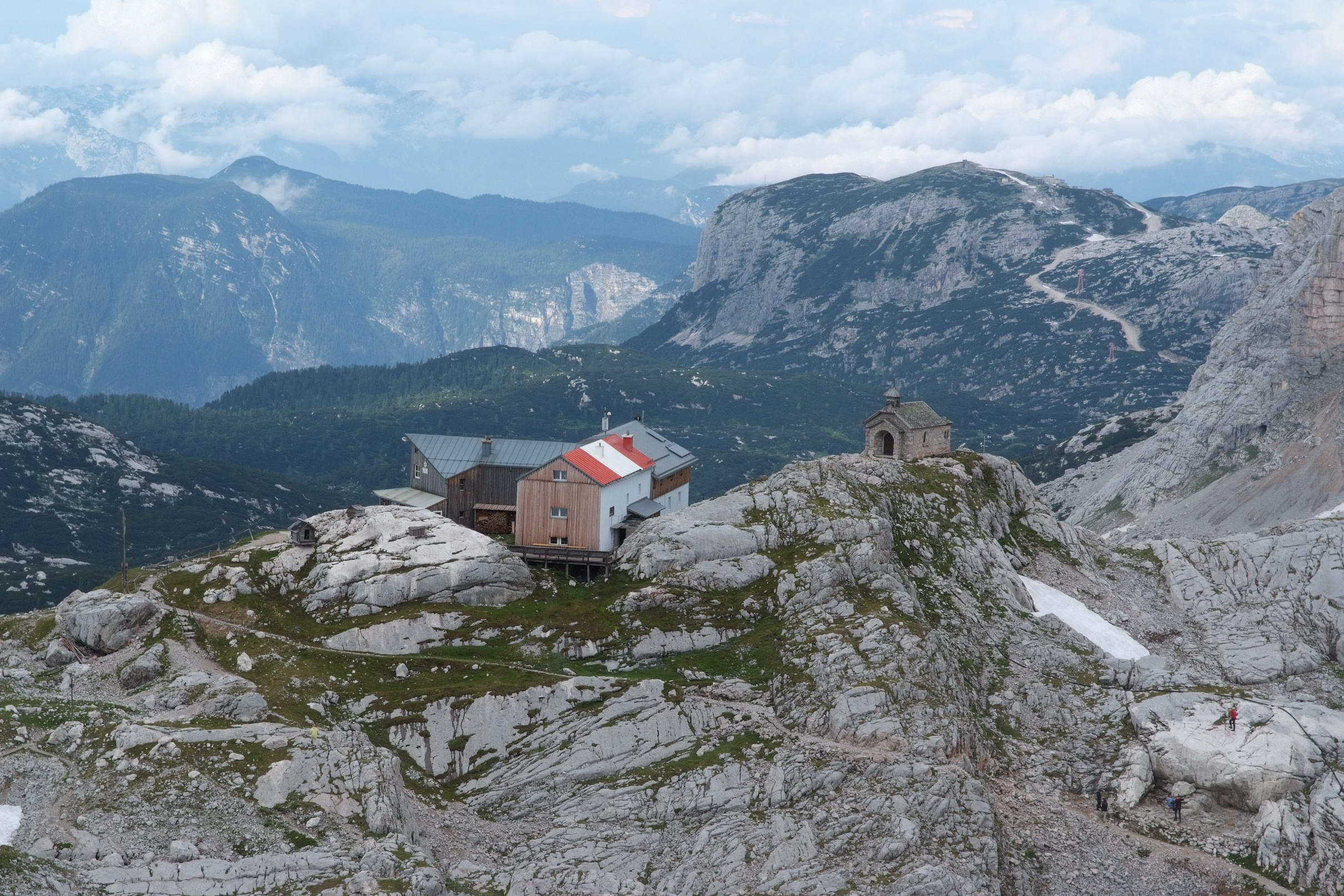
A view of the Simony Hut and the Dachstein Chapel (centre right) from the east.

== Approaches ==
- From Gjaidalm (1,750 m, Dachstein Cable Car from Obertraun) via the Hüttenweg path, medium difficulty, duration: 2 1/2 hours
- From Hunerkogel (2,690 m, Dachstein South Face Cable Car from Ramsau) via the Hallstätter Glacier, only for the experienced, with Klettersteig equipment, duration: 1 1/2 hours
- From Hallstatt (515 m) via the Wiesberg House, physically challenging, duration: 6 hours
- From Obertraun (540 m, valley station Dachstein Cable Car) via the Gjaidalm, physically challenging, duration: 6 hours

== Crossings ==
As the Simony Hut lies near the Hallstätter Glacier, most routes require knowledge of glacier crossing with appropriate equipment. The only exceptions are the paths to the Wiesberg House and the Gjaidalm.

- Wiesberg House (1,887 m) via Hochplateau, medium difficulty, duration: 1 hour
- Adamek Hut (2,196 m)
  - via Hohen Trog and Hoßwandscharte (wind gap), medium difficulty, duration: 4 1/2 hours
  - via Hallstätter Glacier, Steinerscharte (wind gap) and Gosau Glacier, duration: 3 1/2 hours
- Seethaler Hut (2,740 m) via the Hallstätter Glacier, duration: 2 1/2 hours
- Dachsteinsüdwand Hut (1,910 m) via Hallstätter Glacier and Hunerscharte (wind gap), duration: 4 1/2 hours
- Austria Hut (1,638 m) via Hallstätter Glacier, Austriascharte (wind gap) and Edelgrieß, duration: 5 hours
- Guttenberg House (2,146 m) via Hallstätter Glacier, Gjaidstein saddle and Gruberscharte (wind gap), duration: 6 hours
- Schilcher House (1,740 m) on the Gjaidalm, via the Hochplateau, medium difficulty, duration: 2 hours

== Ascents ==
- Hoher Dachstein (2,995 m) via Seethaler Hut, only for the experienced, UIAA grade I-II, safety features in places, duration: 3 1/2 hours
- Hoher Gjaidstein (2,794 m) via Eisseen, Gjaidkar and Notbiwak, only for the experienced, pathless in places, duration: 2 1/2 hours
- Hoher Ochsenkogel (2,520 m) via the Hohen Trog, medium difficulty, pathless in places, but signed, duration: 2 hours
- Schöberl (2,422 m) via the medium difficulty Klettersteig, only with equipment, duration: 45 minutes
- Taubenkogel (2,301 m), duration: c. 2 hours
- Other summits only climbable with Alpine experience and local knowledge because they are largely pathless: Hohes Kreuz (2,837 m), Niederer Dachstein (2,934 m), Eisstein (2,654 m)

== See also ==
- Laufen Hut, at the foot of the Fritzerkogel mountain in Salzburg, Austria.
