= Friedrich Simony =

Austrian geographer and Alpine researcher

Friedrich Simony (30 November 1813, Hrochowteinitz – 20 July 1896, Sankt Gallen) was an Austrian geographer and Alpine researcher.

Initially trained as a pharmacist, from 1836 he studied natural sciences at the University of Vienna by way of influence from botanist Joseph Franz von Jacquin. In 1848 he became a curator at the natural history museum in Klagenfurt, and during the following year, served as chief geologist at the Imperial Geological Institute in Vienna. In 1851, at the University of Vienna, he attained the first professorship for geography in Austria. In this role, he conducted research in the fields of glaciology, climatology, speleology, ecology, hydrology, phytogeography, etc.

From 1840 he performed geomorphological and glaciological research of the Dachstein Mountains. In September 1843 he was the first to spend the night at the summit of Hoher Dachstein (2995 m); in January 1847 he was first to achieve a winter ascent of the peak.

He is credited as being the first to undertake systematic meteorological studies of the eastern Alps, similar to the research Horace-Bénédict de Saussure performed in the western Alps years earlier. He was a pioneer in the field of limnology; in 1844 he conducted depth soundings of the Hallstätter See, results of which, were published decades later in Atlas der österreichischen Alpenseen ("Atlas of the Austrian Alpine lakes", edited by Albrecht Penck and Eduard Richter, 2 volumes, 1895–96). Throughout his career, he conducted extensive investigations on the depths and temperatures of all the lakes in Salzkammergut.

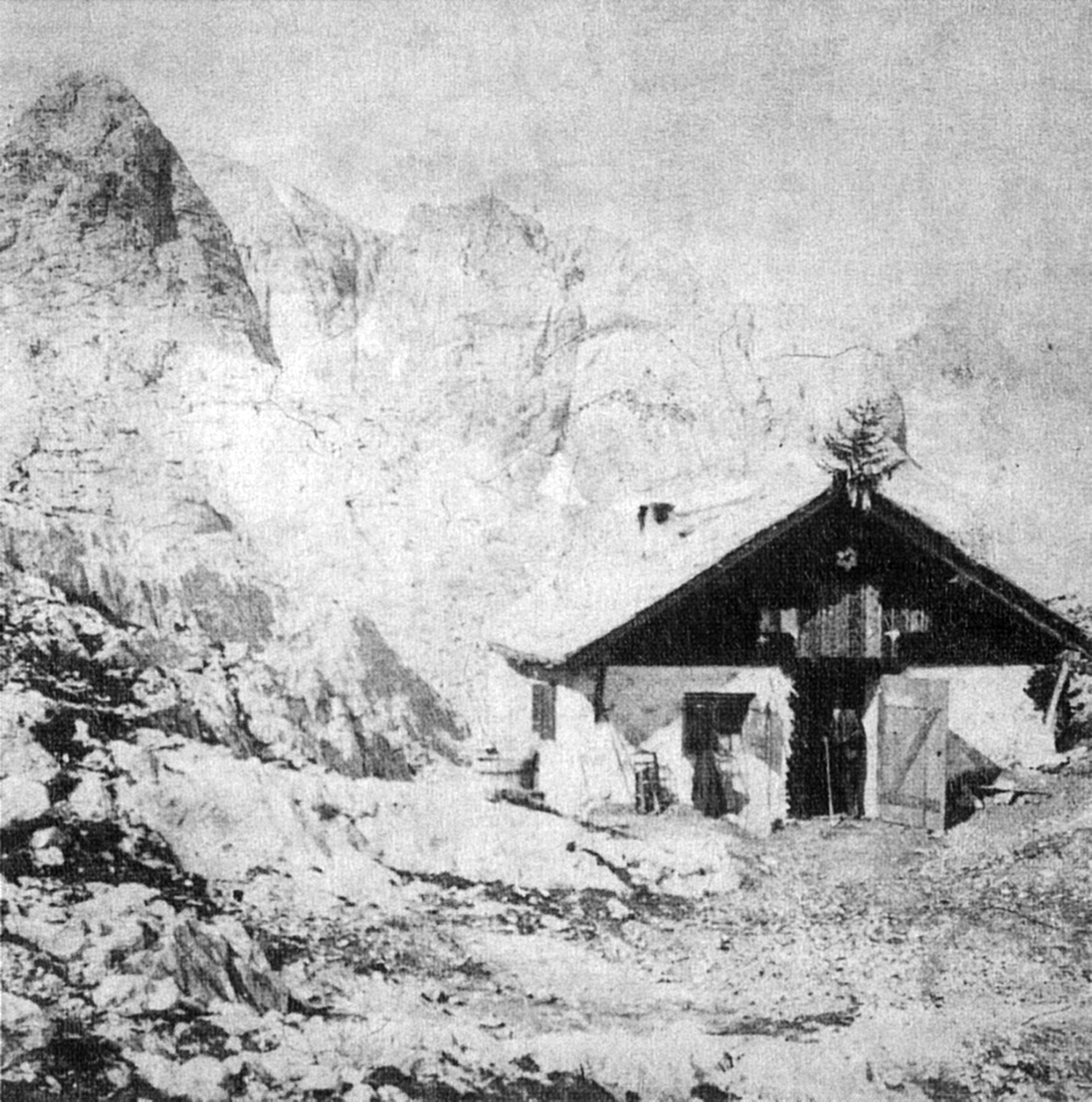
1877 photograph of the first Simony-Hütte.

In 1862 he was co-founder of the Austrian Alpine Club. Today, the organization owns a building known as the "Simony-Hütte" (Simony Hut, 2205 m). It is located near Hallstätter Glacier and is named after him. His name is also associated with several Alpine landmarks, such as: Simonykees (Simony Glacier), Simony-Scharte (Simony Notch), Simonyschneide (Simony Ridge) and Simonyspitzen (Simony Peaks).

== Selected works ==
- Die Seen des Salzkammergutes, 1850.
- Die Alterthümer vom Hallstätter Salzberg und dessen Umgehung, 1851.
- Physiognomischer Atlas der österreichischen Alpen, 1862.
- Die Gletscher des Dachsteingebirges, 1871.
- Das Dachsteingebeit: ein geographisches Charakterbild aus den österreichischen Nordalpen, 3 volumes, 1889–95).
