= 2019 TCR Hill Climb Touring Car Series =

Cancelled touring car competition

The 2019 TCR Hill Climb Touring Car Series was set to be the first season of the TCR Hill Climb Touring Car Series. The season would have begun on 4 May in Eschdorf, Luxembourg and ended on 22 September in Sankt Agatha, Austria. However, on 24 April 2019 it was announced by Auto Sport Switzerland that the TCR Hill Climb Touring Car Series Trophy will be postponed until 2020 due to lack of entries with only 2 confirmed drivers at the time of announcement.

== Teams and drivers ==
Team	Car	No.	Drivers	Rounds
(Serbia) LEIN Racing	CUPRA León TCR	TBA	(Serbia) Nikola Miljković	TBA
(North Macedonia) LPR Stefanovski Racing Team	Hyundai i30 N TCR	TBA	(North Macedonia) Igor Stefanovski	TBA

== Calendar and results ==
Six events were scheduled for the season.

Rnd.	Circuit/Location	Date
1	Eschdorf, Luxembourg	4–5 May
2	Verzegnis, Italy	1–2 June
3	Beaujolais, France	15–16 June
4	Hauenstein, Germany	27–28 July
5	Les Rangiers, Switzerland	17–18 August
6	Sankt Agatha, Austria	21–22 September
