= Laufen Hut =

Austrian mountain refuge

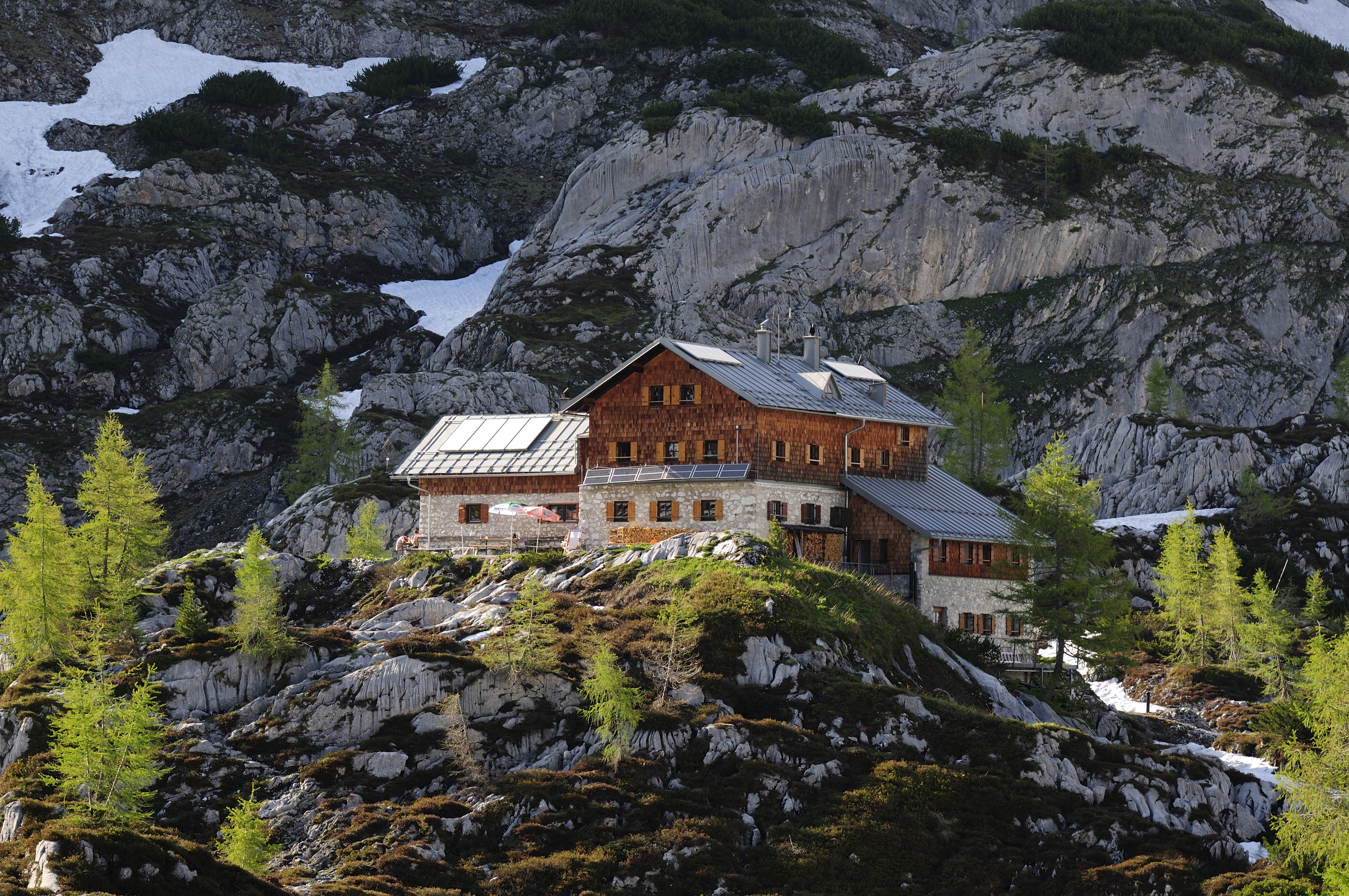
- Interactive map of the Laufen Hut area

General information
- Location: Lungötz, Tennengau, Land Salzburg
- Coordinates: 47°31′13.44″N 13°20′11.24″E
- Elevation: 1,726 m (5,663 ft)
- Year built: 1925
- Owner: German Alpine Club Alpine Section — Laufen

Website
- www.alpenverein-laufen.de/html/laufener_h_.html

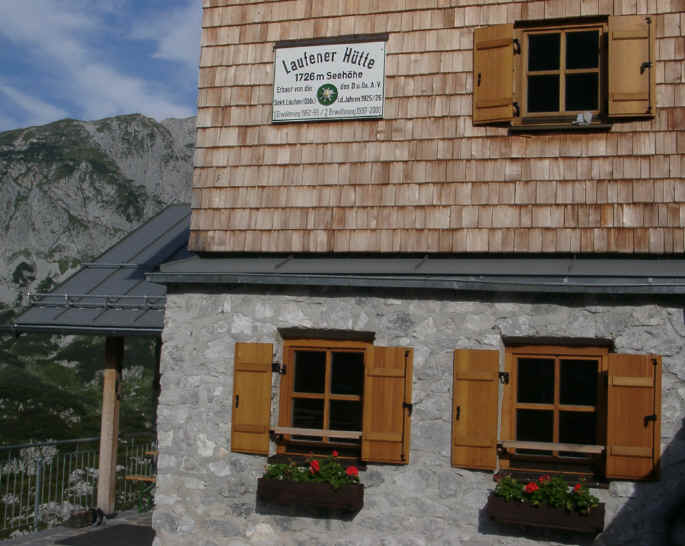
Entrance

The Laufen Hut (German: Laufener Hütte) is an Alpine club hut operated as a self-service facility that serves as a base for numerous climbing routes, circular routes and crossings, as well as hiking and skiing on the plateau of the Tennen Mountains Range. It sits at an elevation of 1,726 metres (5,663 ft) in the Tennen Mountains, at the foot of the Fritzerkogel mountain in the Austrian state of Salzburg. The Fritzerkogel, with an elevation of 2,360 metres (7,740 ft), is one of the higher peaks in the Tennen Mountains in the Northern Limestone Alps.

== History and facilities ==
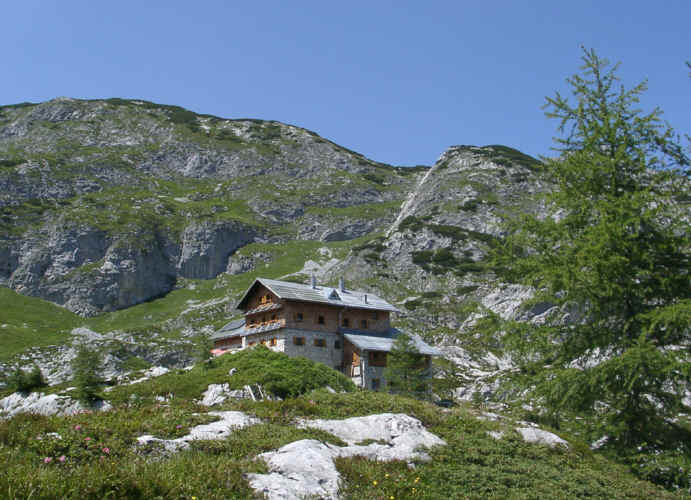
Hut in front of the Fritzerkogel

The hut is named after the nearby German town of Laufen (Salzach) and is managed by the German Alpine Club, though it is just across the border in Austria. The hut was built in 1925 and 1926 by the German Alpine Club and Austrian Alpine Club. The first expansion occurred between 1952–1955. Its present appearance dates from the years 1997–2000. In this period the hut was extensively renovated, extended and converted. In addition, the energy supply of the hut was improved to embrace the latest technology:

- Solar hot water system with an area of 10.8 square metres (116 sq ft) and a storage volume of 800 litres (850 US qt)
- Photovoltaic system with a total capacity 1760 W, voltage 24 V, 230 V inverter, rated capacity of 800 Ah
- Cogeneration plant that runs on vegetable oil, electric power 10 kVA, 21 kW thermal power, about 87% efficiency

In 2001 the Laufen Hut was awarded the environmental seal of approval of the Alpine Associations. There is a climbing garden nearby. Currently there are three sectors with 22 routes which range from the lower third to the lower 7th difficulty level of the International Mountaineering and Climbing Federation.

== Approaches ==
- From Abtenau (715 metres (2,346 ft)) along the Hüttenweg through the Wandalm, duration: 3½ hours.
- From the Karalm (1,000 metres (3,300 ft)) along the Hüttenweg through the Wandalm, duration: 2½ hours.
- From Spießhof, Sankt Martin-Lammertal, via Lungötz, (965 metres (3,166 ft)) along the Scharfer Steig, duration: 3½ hours.

== Crossings ==
There are many hiking and backpacking routes accessible from the Laufen Hut. Some of them are:

- Dr. Heinrich Hackel Hut (1,530 metres (5,020 ft)) via Tennkessel, Bleikogel and Tauernscharte, duration: 5 hours.
- Edelweiss Hut (Edelweißerhütte, 2,350 metres (7,710 ft)) via Tennkessel, Bleikogel and Wengerscharte, duration: 6 hours.
- Leopold Happisch Haus (1,925 metres (6,316 ft)) via Tennkessel, Bleikogel and Wengerscharte, duration: 7 hours.
- Gsengalm Hut (1,450 metres (4,760 ft)) via Tagweide and Firstsattel, duration: 3½ hours.
- Gwechenberg Hut (1,365 metres (4,478 ft)) via Tagweide and Firstsattel, duration: 3½ hours.

== Ascents ==
The summits that can be ascended from the Laufen Hut are:

- Tagweide (2,128 metres (6,982 ft)), medium, duration: 1½ hours.
- Hochkarfelderkopf (2,219 metres (7,280 ft)) along the Edelweißscharte, easy, duration: 2 hours.
- Hochkarfelderkopf (2,219 metres (7,280 ft)) via Tagweide, difficult, duration: 2½ hours.
- Edelweißkogel (2,030 metres (6,660 ft)) along the Edelweißscharte, easy, duration: 1 hours.
- Fritzerkogel (2,360 metres (7,740 ft))
  - along the Ostgrat, medium, duration: 2 hours.
  - through the Tennkessel, medium, duration: 2½ hours.
- Bleikogel (2,412 metres (7,913 ft)) through the Tennkessel and the west flank, duration: 3 hours.

== Gallery ==
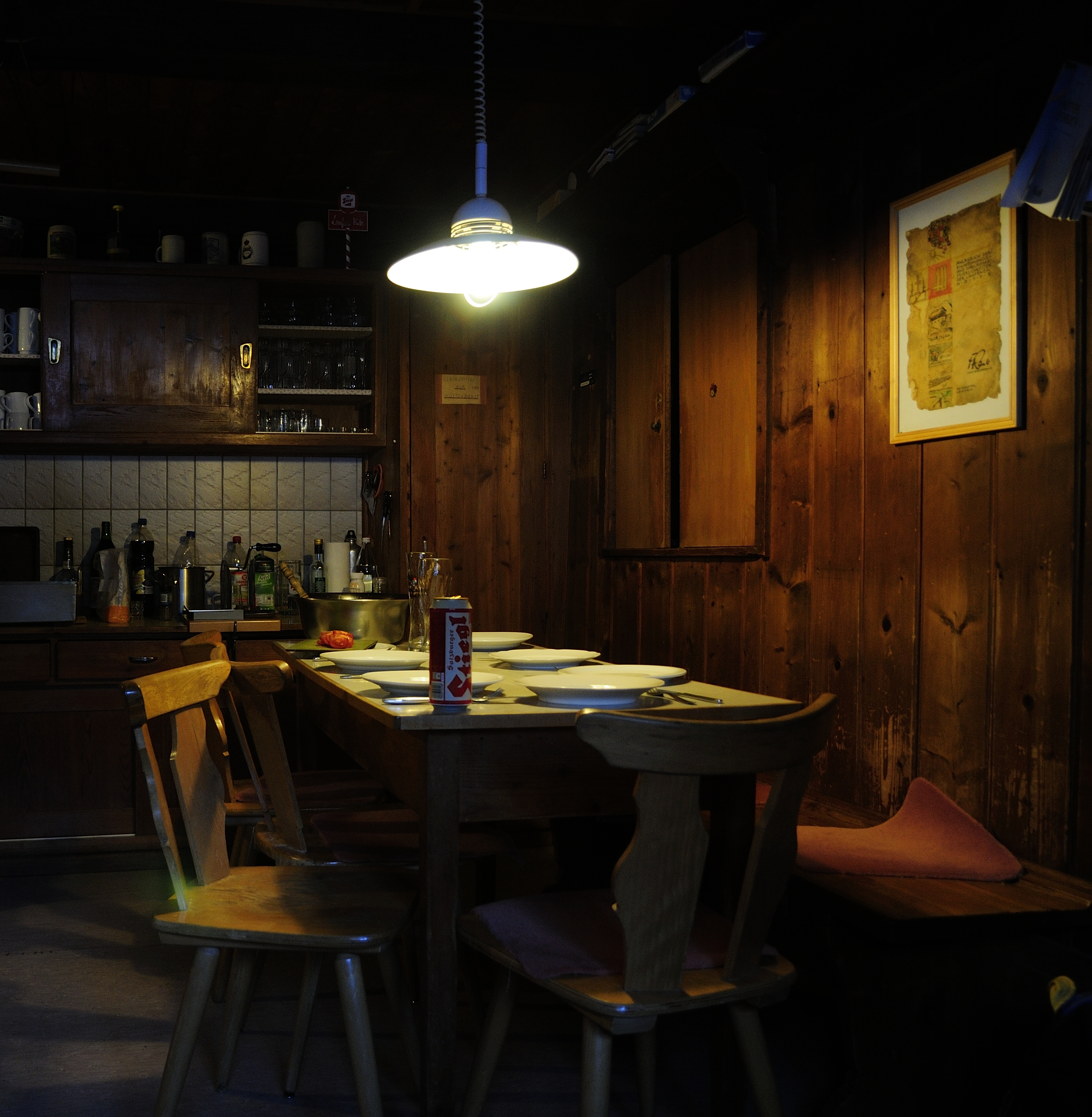
Kitchen

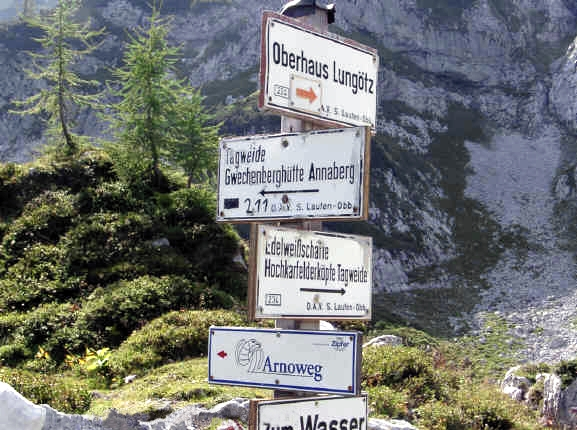
Signpost near the hut

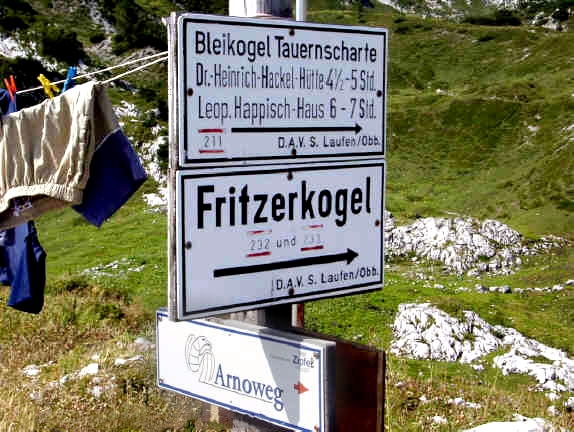
Signpost near the hut

== See also ==
- Simony Hut, at the foot of the Hoher Dachstein in Upper Austria.
