= Gjaidstein =

Hoher Gjaidstein
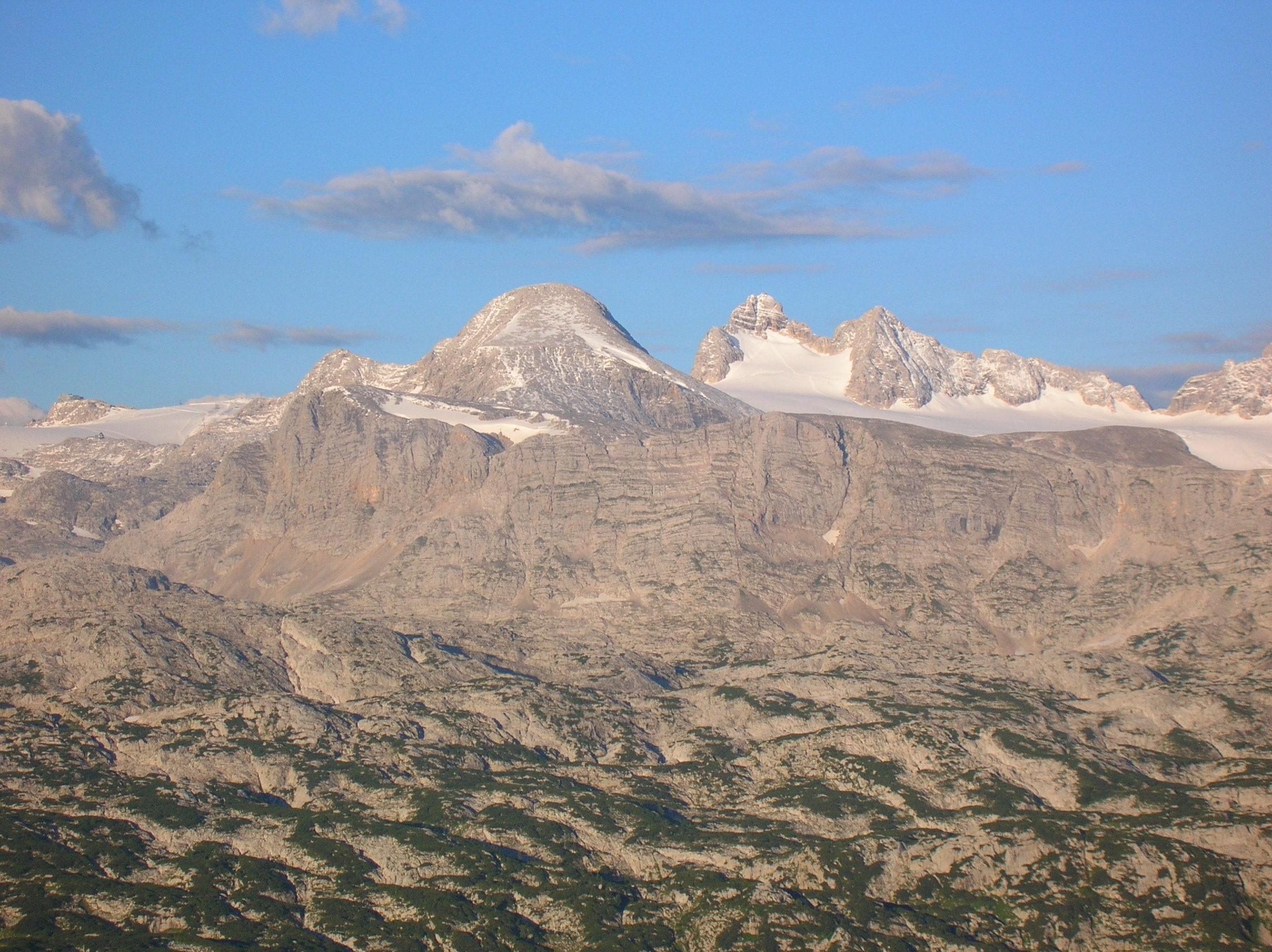
- The Gjaidstein and Hoher Dachstein

Highest point
- Elevation: 2,794 m (AA) (9,167 ft)
- Prominence: 167 m (548 ft)
- Coordinates: 47°28′54″N 13°37′56″E

Geography
- Location within Austria
- Location: Upper Austria, Austria
- Parent range: Dachstein Mountains

Geology
- Mountain type: Limestone

Climbing
- Normal route: SW arête from Gjaidstein saddle, grade I

The Hoher Gjaidstein is a 2,794 metres (9,167 ft) high mountain peak in the Dachstein Mountains in Upper Austria east and above the Hallstätter Glacier. It may be reached from the summit station of the Dachstein South Face Cable Car or from the Simony Hut each of which is an easy grade I climb. As well as the Hoher Gjaidstein (="High Gjaidstein") there is also the Niederen Gjaidstein ("Low Gjaidstein", 2,482 metres [8,143 ft]) and the Kleinen Gjaidstein ("Little Gjaidstein", 2,734 metres [8,970 ft]).

The mountain was climbed as early as 1823 by de Halley from the north from the Gjaid cirque (Gjaidkar). Whether the actual summit had been conquered earlier is not known.

== Sources ==
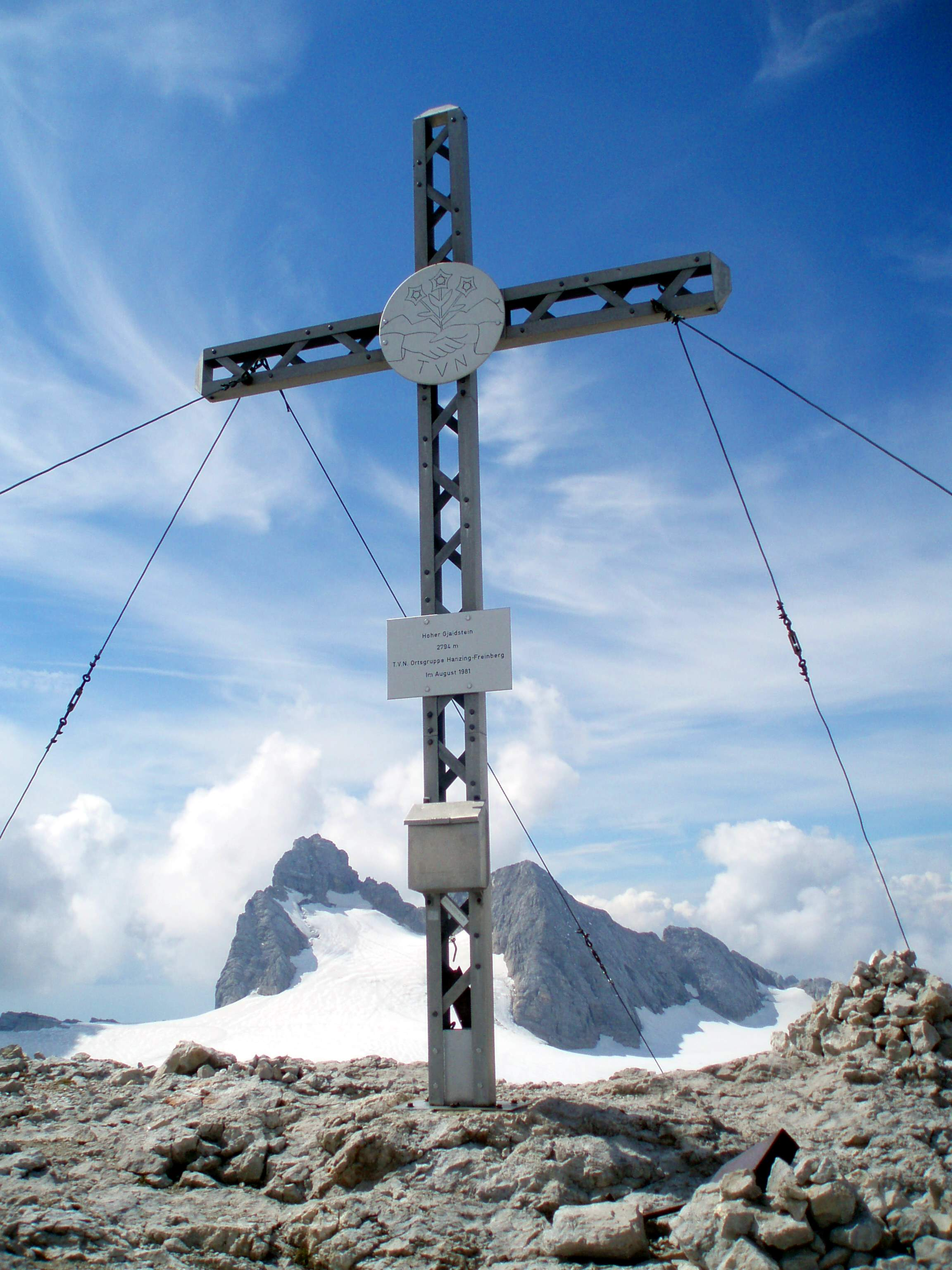
Summit cross of 1981

- Willi End: Alpenvereinsführer Dachsteingebirge Ost. Bergverlag Rudolf Rother, Munich 1980. ISBN 3-7633-1234-X. Randzahlen 1061 – 1079
