= Dachstein Chapel =

Chapel in Dachstein Mountains, Austria

Coordinates: 47°30′02″N 13°37′27″E

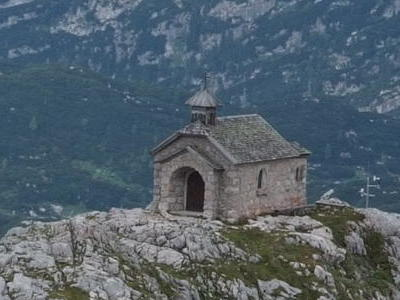
The Dachstein Chapel

The Dachstein Chapel (German: Dachsteinkapelle) is located immediately next to the Simony Hut in the Dachstein Mountains. It lies at a height of 2,206 metres (7,238 ft) and is the highest place of worship in the Northern Limestone Alps. It is located within the municipality area of Hallstatt in the district of Gmunden (Upper Austria) in Austria. It belongs to the Roman Catholic Diocese of Linz and is a cultural heritage monument.

== History ==
The Dachstein Chapel was built in 1913 by the master builder Matthäus Schlager (1870 - 1959) who also built some other, bigger churches in Austria like the Cathedral in Linz. The chapel was consecrated by the Bishop of Linz, Rudolph Hittmair on 1 September 1914. The interior was left unfinished because of the First World War, but was ultimately completed in 1994.

In 1925 a memorial plaque to the Bishop of Linz, Rudolph Hittmair, was unveiled in the chapel.

In 2013 and 2014 the 100 year anniversaries of the laying of the foundation stone and the consecration have been celebrated.

In 2015 there was a restoration of the roof covering, the interior plastering and the facade. The restoration has been paid by the federal state of Upper Austria, the Diocese of Linz, the National Monuments Office, the Roman Catholic parish of Hallstatt and private donors.
