= Eduard Richter =

Austrian geographer and glaciologist (1847–1905)

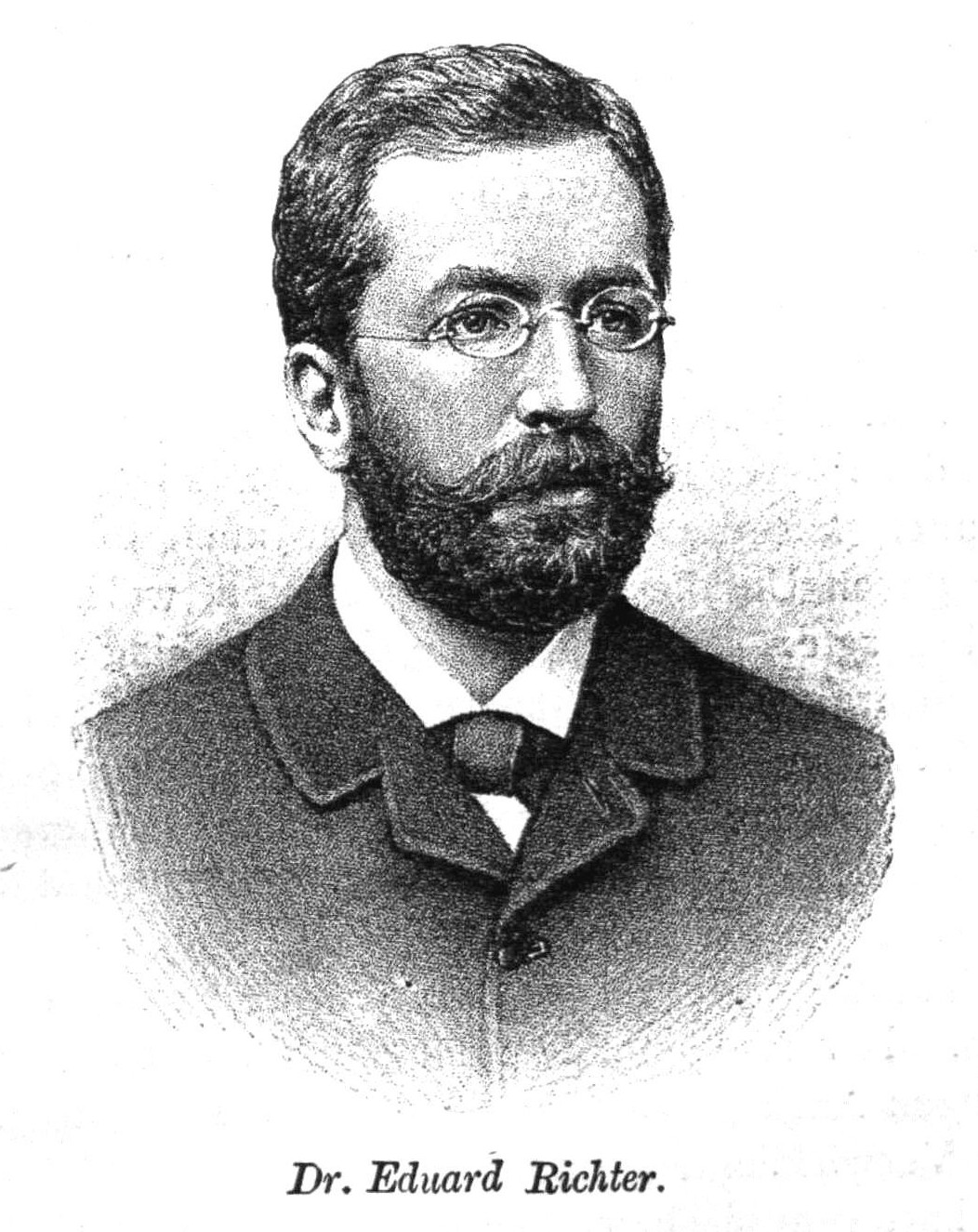
Eduard Richter

Eduard Richter (3 October 1847, Mannersdorf am Leithagebirge – 6 February 1905, Graz) was an Austrian geographer and glaciologist.

== Biography ==
He studied history and geography at the University of Vienna, where his instructors included Theodor von Sickel and Friedrich Simony. From 1871 to 1886 he was a gymnasium teacher in Salzburg, and in 1886 became a professor of geography at the University of Graz. In 1895 he traveled to Norway in order to conduct glaciological studies.

From 1883 to 1885 he served as central committee president of the "German and Austrian Alpine Club" (DÖAV), and in 1898-1900 was president of the International Glacier Commission. In August 1871, with Alpinist Johann Stüdl, he was the first to ascend to the summit of the Schlieferspitze (3289 m).

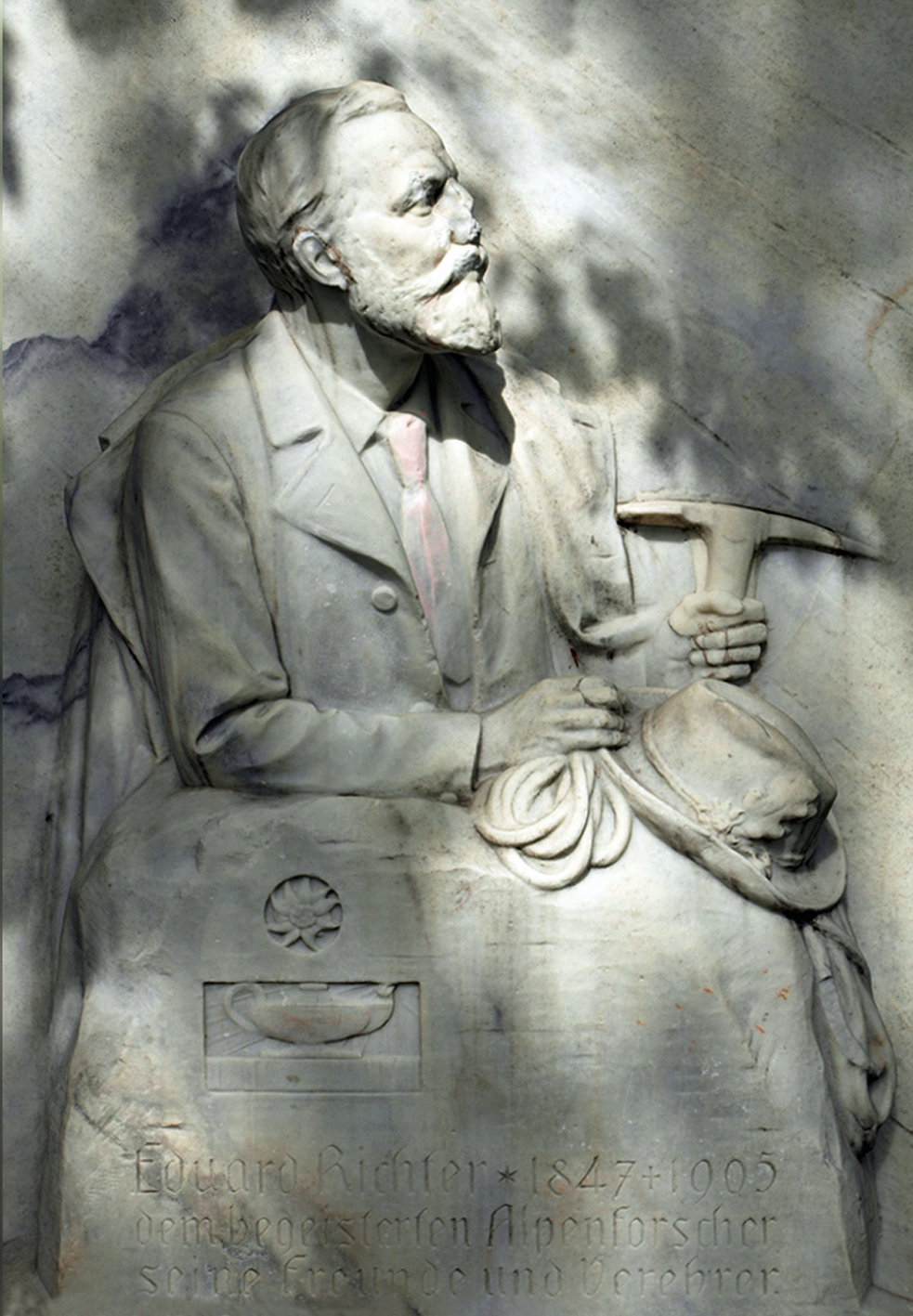
Monument of Richter on Richterhöhe in Salzburg

He is best remembered for his glaciological and limnological research of the eastern Alpine region. Among his numerous writings were an 1888 survey of 1012 glaciers found in the eastern Alps and a 1900 geomorphological study of the High Alps. With Albrecht Penck, he was editor of Atlas der Österreichischen Alpenseen (Atlas of the Austrian Alpine lakes, 1895).

== Selected works ==
- Der Krieg in Tirol im Jahre 1809, (1875) – The war in Tirol in 1809.
- Das Herzogthum Salzburg, 1881 – The Duchy of Salzburg.
- Die Gletscher der Ostalpen, 1888 – Glaciers of the eastern Alps.
- Die Erschliessung der Ostalpen, 1893-94 (editor) – The development of the eastern Alps.
- Seestudien. Erläuterungen zur zweiten Lieferung des Atlas der österreichischen Alpenseen, 1896 – Lake studies, notes to the second installment for the Atlas of the Austrian Alpine lakes.
- Geomorphologische Untersuchungen in den Hochalpen, 1900 – Geomorphological investigations of the High Alps.
- Historischer Atlas der österreichischen Alpenländer, 1906 (editor) – Historical atlas of the Austrian Alps.
