= Hallstätter Glacier =

Glacier in Austria

Hallstätter Gletscher
- Karleisfeld, Karl Icefield
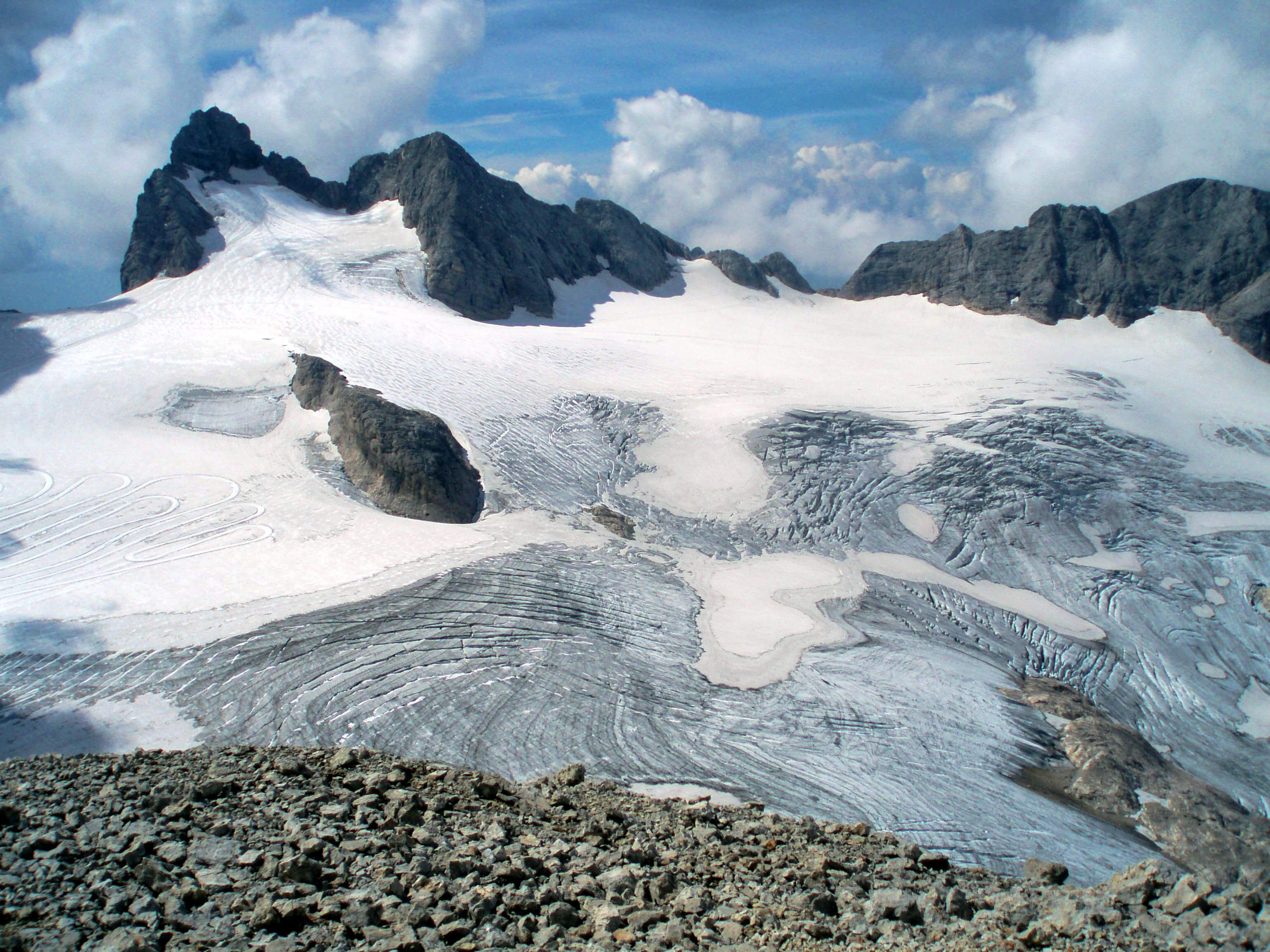
- The Hallstätter Glacier
- Interactive map of Hallstätter Gletscher
- Location: Austria
- Coordinates: 47°28′47″N 13°36′41″E

The Hallstätter Glacier (German: Hallstätter Gletscher) (formerly also called the Karleisfeld or Karl Icefield) is the largest glacier in the Dachstein Mountains. It lies immediately beneath the northern foot of the Dachstein itself and runs down to the Eissee lake below the Simony Hut at a height of 2,205 metres (7,234 ft). To the east the Hallstätter Glacier is bounded by the High Gjaidstein. Firmly sealed off at its western snout by the Schöberl, 2,426 metres (7,959 ft), it is bordered in the west by the eastern flank of the Hohes Kreuz ridge, running from south to north, which reaches a height of 2,837 metres (9,308 ft). In its upper third the glacier flows around a prominent landmark, the Eisstein. At its head in the south it is also bordered by the Hunerkogel and the Dirndln.

Other glaciers on the Dachstein are the Gosau Glacier to the west and the Schladminger Glacier to the east.

== Retreat of the glacier ==
The glacier is very sensitive to the climate, as can be seen with views from the Simonyhütte (within 25 years):

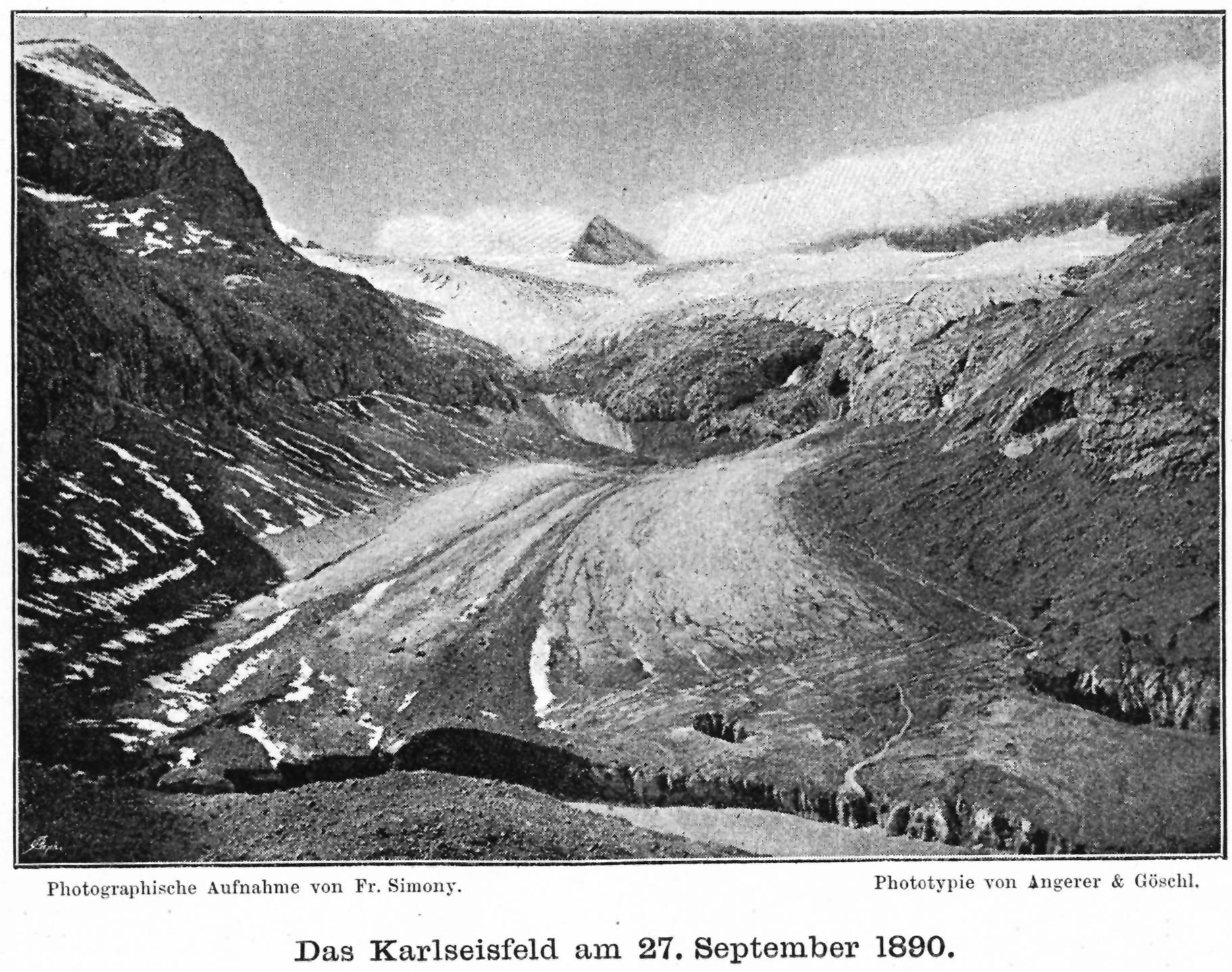
The glacier in 1890

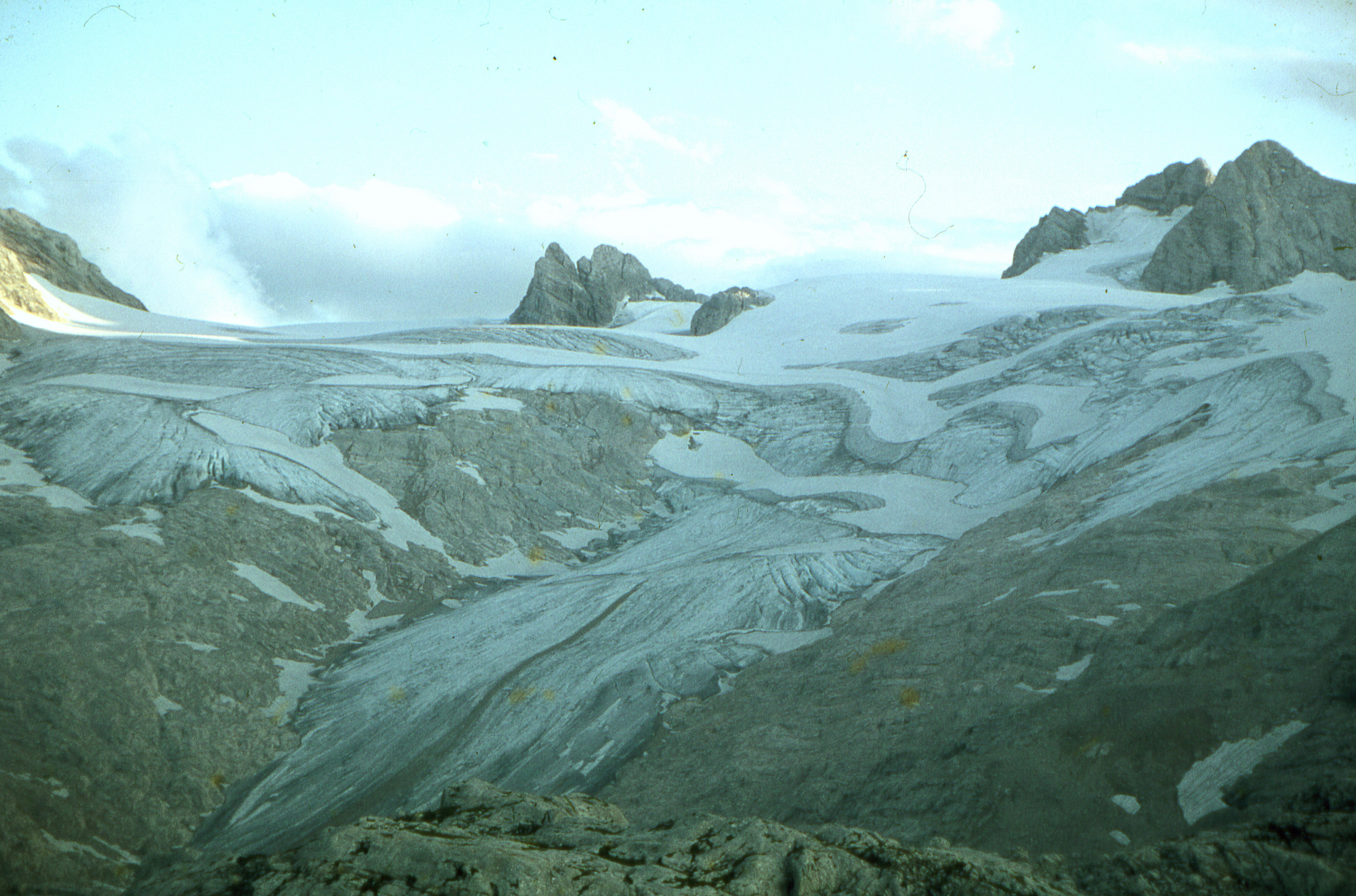
The glacier in 1967

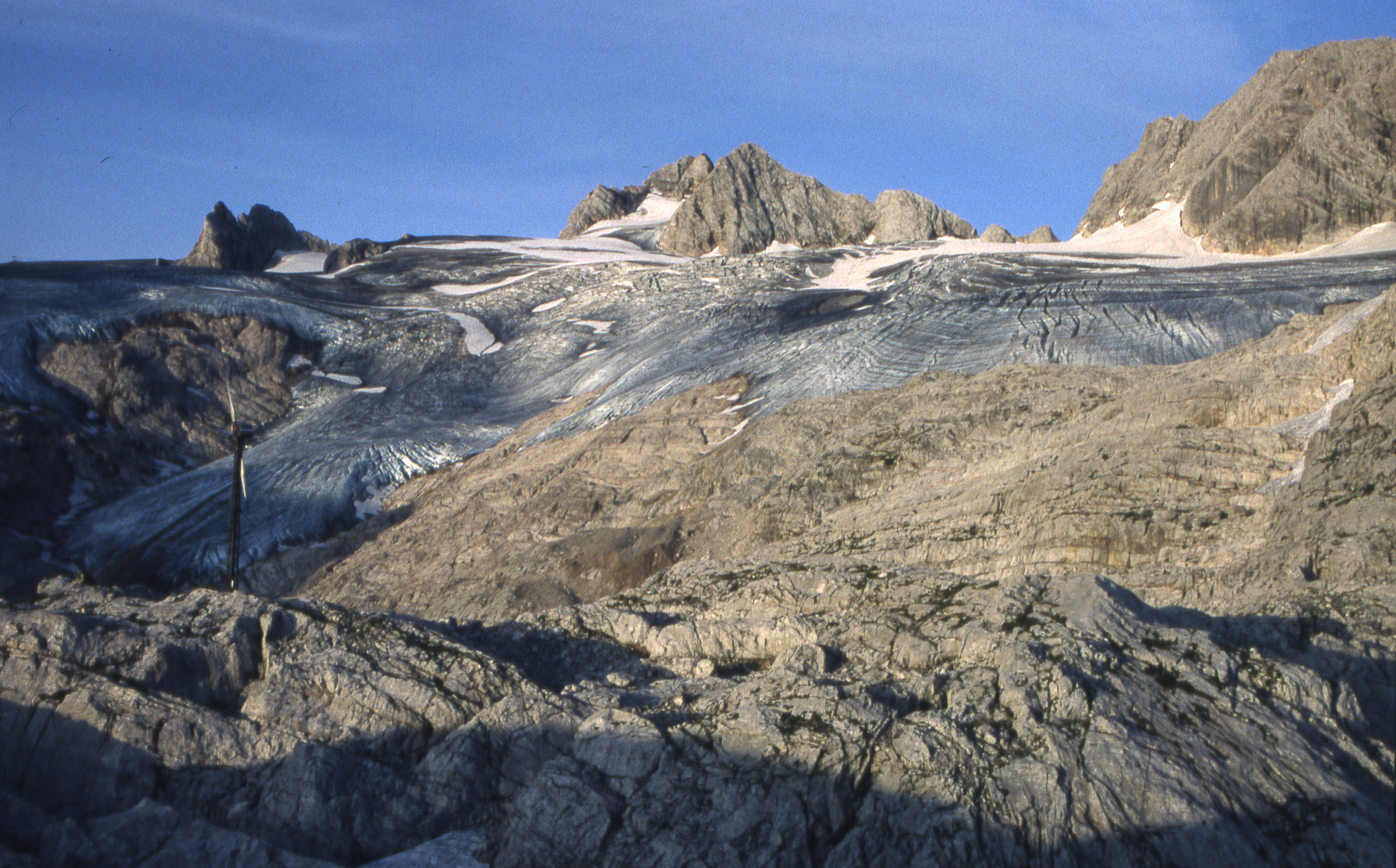
The glacier 25 years later in 1992

== Sources ==
- Roman Moser: Der Hallstätter Gletscher - heute der größte Gletscher der Nördlichen Kalkalpen. In: Oberösterreichische Heimatblätter 8(1954)1-2, S. 103 (Digitalisat)
- Herbert Weingartner: Lehrpfad Hallstätter Gletscher - Ein Begleiter durch die Gebirgslandschaft am Dachstein . Atelier Tintifax, Breitenfurt
