= Fritzerkogel =

Mountain in Austria

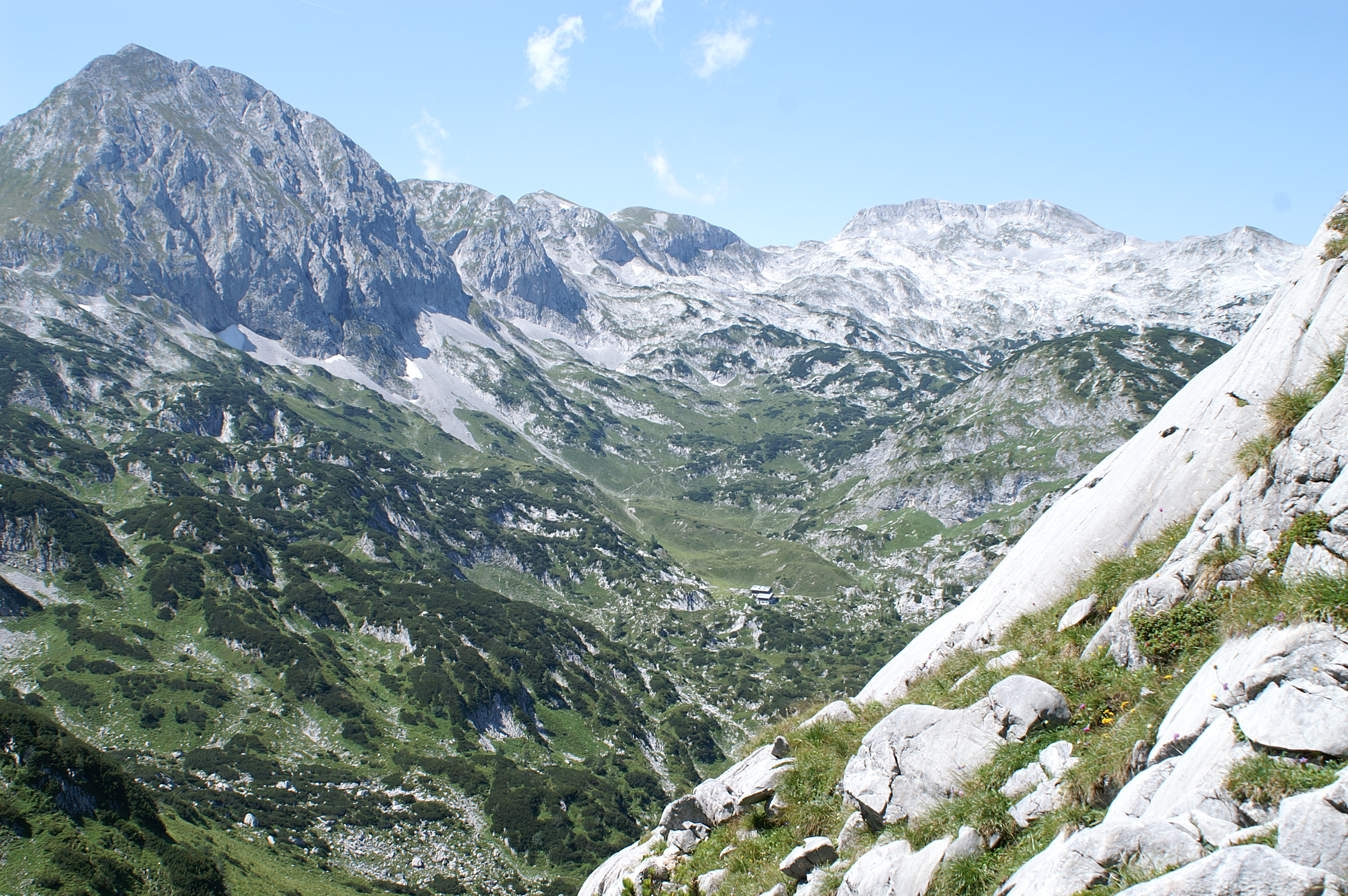
- Fritzerkogel, Tennengebirge, on left, with Laufen Hut in centre

Highest point
- Elevation: 2,360 m (7,740 ft)AT
- Coordinates: 47°30′35″N 13°19′46″E

Geography
- Location within Austria
- Location: Salzburg, Austria
- Parent range: Tennengebirge, Alps

Geology
- Mountain type(s): Ramsau Dolomite, Dachstein Limestone

Climbing
- Easiest route: Abtenau – Wandalm – Laufen Hut – Ostflanke – Fritzerkogel

The Fritzerkogel is a mountain in the Tennengebirge (Tennen Mountain Range) in the northern Limestone Alps, Austria. With its elevation of 2,360 metres (7,740 ft), is one of the higher peaks in the mountain range. Seen from the north it stands out as a relatively isolated, broad summit block, whose mighty rock faces and steep, rugged, rocky flanks (Schrofen) fall away on all sides. Its 1,200-metre-high (3,900 ft) south cliff face is impressive and makes it a striking two-thousander.

== General ==
The Fritzerkogel rises in the eastern part of the Tennen mountains high above the valley of the Lammer between Abtenau and Anne-Lungötz, directly opposite the Gosau ridge, the Bischofsmütze and the Dachstein mountains. Further to the west is the actual karst plateau of the Tennen mountains, behind the Bleikogel mountain. As a solitary peak, the Fritzerkogel offers a good view in all directions. It is therefore climbed frequently. Tours to the summit depart from the Laufen Hut of the German Alpine Club.

The peak Kleiner Fritzerkogel ("Little Fritzerkogel") lies slightly west of the Fritzerkogel, elevation (2,207 metres (7,241 ft)), 47°30′37″N 13°18′56″E, which is why Fritzerkogel is sometimes called Großer Fritzerkogel ("Great Fritzerkogel").

== Routes ==
The Fritzerkogel is one of the most popular mountains in the Tennengebirge, however climbing it is not straightforward. Prerequisites are sure-footedness, a head for heights, good physical fitness, and alpine experience. Unexpected hazards such as fog, leading to disorientation, and sudden storms have given the region a feared reputation amongst climbers.

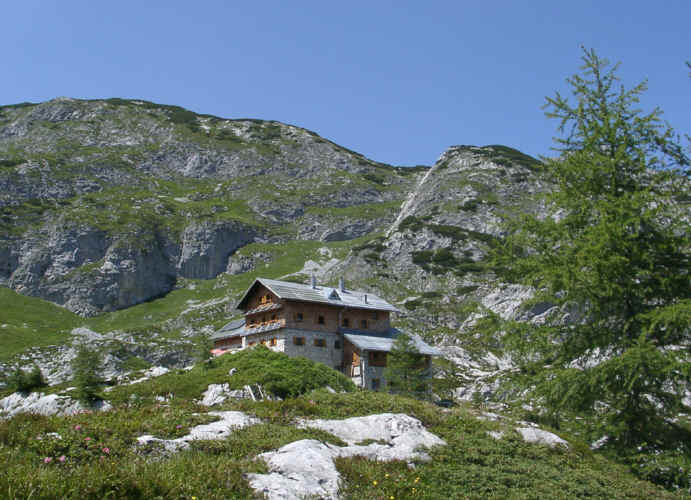
Laufen Hut at the foot of Fritzerkogel

The typical ascent to the Laufen Hut begins in Abtenau. From the hut, there are two routes:

- via the east face, duration: 2 hours, change in elevation: 650 metres (2,130 ft)

This steep climb is the normal route and runs from the Laufen Hut, initially southwards across grass- and fir-covered slopes as well as several corries, to a shoulder. Turning right, the path crosses the very steep eastern flank, which is quite exposed, over schrofen terrain to the summit with its summit cross. The path is signed throughout; its grade is I, according to the UIAA.

- via the west face, duration: 2.5 hours, change in elevation: 650 metres (2,130 ft)

This route is not as difficult, but longer, running initially westwards from the Laufen Hut to the Tennkessel, then turning left after 15 minutes, the path straight ahead leading to the Bleikogel. It continues up a fairly steep climb through a rock-filled cirque (Geröllkar) and the so-called Eiskeller (ice-house) to a col west of the summit. The final ascent to the summit is rather easy, passing grassy slopes to reach the summit cross. Signed throughout, this route is graded "unschwierig" (not difficult). The route is a ski touring route in winter.
