= Sankt Agatha =

- Municipality
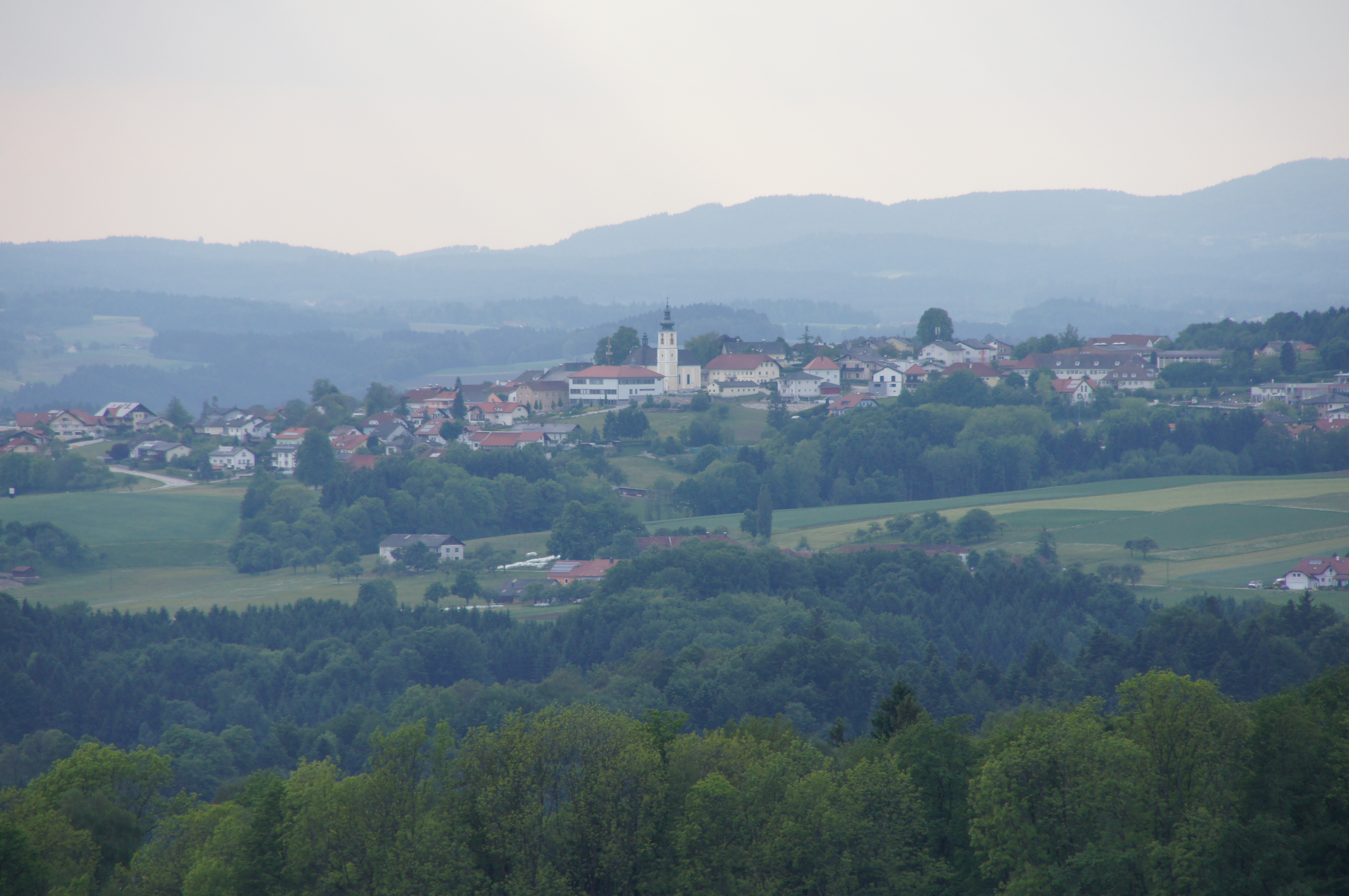

- Coat of arms

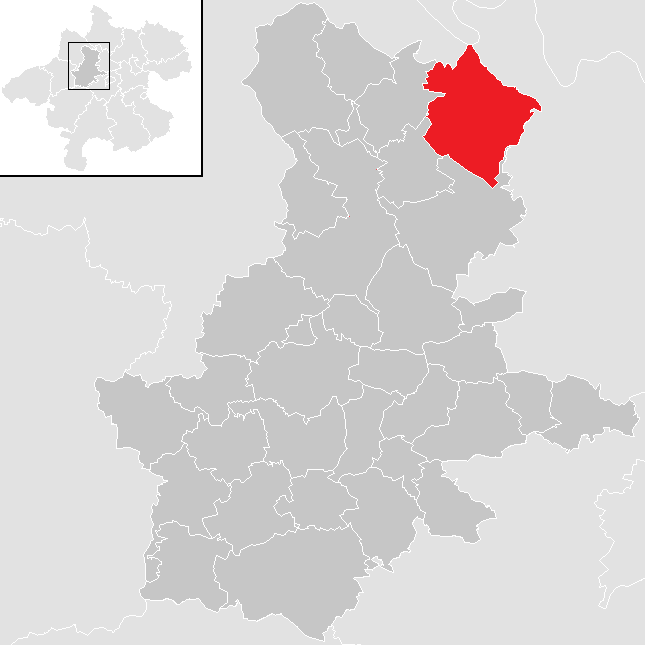
- Location in the district

- Location within Austria
- Coordinates: 48°23′10″N 13°52′44″E
- Country: Austria
- State: Upper Austria
- District: Grieskirchen

Government
  - Mayor: Franz Weissenböck (ÖVP)

Area
  - Total: 31.78 km^{2} (12.27 sq mi)
- Elevation: 603 m (1,978 ft)

Population (2018-01-01)
  - Total: 2,116
  - Density: 66.58/km^{2} (172.4/sq mi)
- Time zone: UTC+1 (CET)
  - Summer (DST): UTC+2 (CEST)
- Postal code: 4084
- Area code: 07277
- Vehicle registration: GR
- Website: www.st-agatha.at

Sankt Agatha is a municipality in the district of Grieskirchen in the Austrian state of Upper Austria.

== Geography ==
Sankt Agatha lies in the Hausruckviertel. About 30 percent of the municipality is forest, and 65 percent is farmland.
