= Hoher Dachstein =

Mountain in Austria

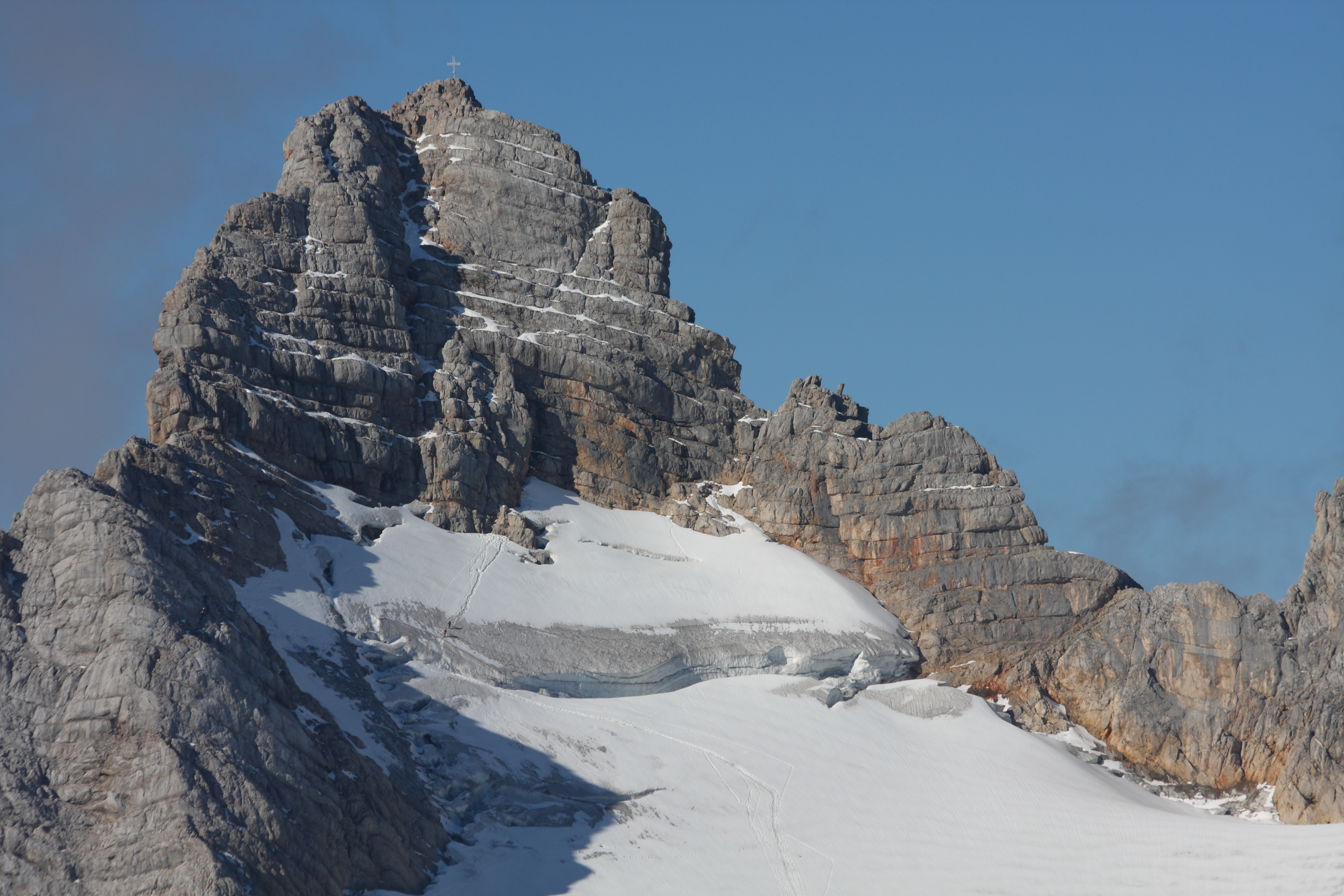
- Hoher Dachstein summit

Highest point
- Elevation: 2,995 m (9,826 ft)
- Prominence: 2,136 m (7,008 ft); Ranked 8th in the Alps
- Listing: Ultra
- Coordinates: 47°28′31″N 13°36′23″E

Naming
- English translation: high roof stone
- Language of name: German
- Pronunciation: German: [ˈhoːɐ̯ ˈdaxʃtaɪn]

Geography
- Location within Austria
- Location: Upper Austria / Styria, Austria
- Parent range: Northern Limestone Alps

Geology
- Rock age: Triassic
- Mountain type: Limestone

Climbing
- First ascent: 1834 Peter Karl Thurwieser, Adam und Peter Gappmayr (Gosau side)

UNESCO World Heritage Site
- Part of: Hallstatt-Dachstein / Salzkammergut Cultural Landscape
- Criteria: Cultural: (iii)(iv)
- Reference: 806
- Inscription: 1997 (21st Session)

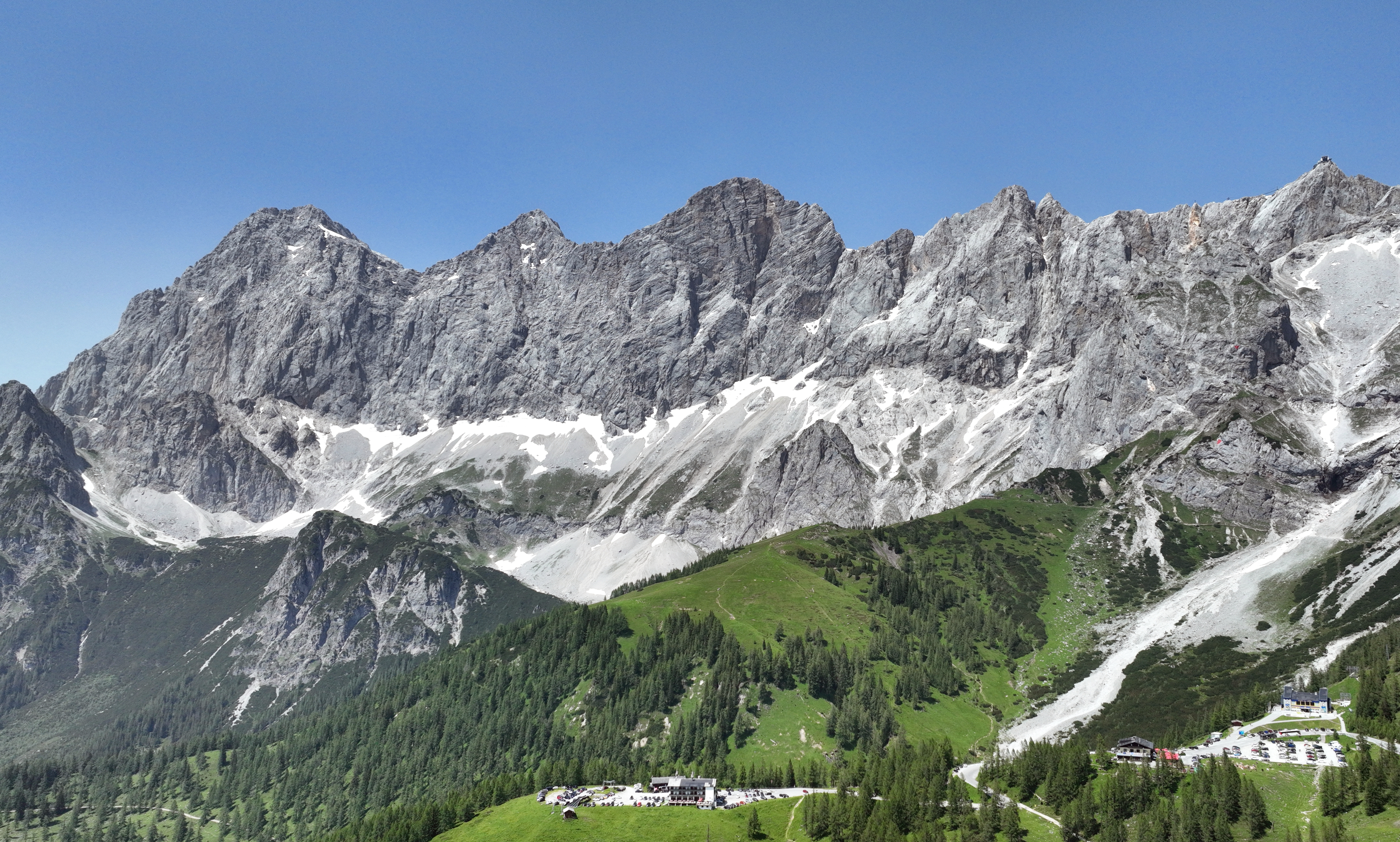
South face with the Hoher Dachstein in the middle of the picture

Hoher Dachstein (German: [ˈhoːɐ̯ ˈdaxʃtaɪn]) is a strongly karstic mountain in central Austria and the second-highest mountain in the Northern Limestone Alps. It is situated at the border of Upper Austria and Styria, and is the highest point in each of those states. Parts of the massif also lie in the state of Salzburg, leading to the mountain being referred to as the Drei-Länder-Berg ("three-state mountain").

The Dachstein massif covers an area of around 600 square kilometres (230 sq mi) with dozens of peaks above 2,500 m, the highest of which are in the southern and southwestern areas. The main summit of the Hoher Dachstein is at an elevation of 2,995 metres (9,826 ft). Seen from the north, the Dachstein massif is dominated by glaciers with rocky summits rising beyond them. By contrast, to the south, the mountain drops almost vertically to the valley floor.

== Geology ==
The geology of the Dachstein massif is dominated by the Dachstein-Kalk Formation ("Dachstein limestone"), dating from Triassic times. In common with other karstic areas, the Dachstein is permeated by a rich cave system, including some of the largest caves in Austria, such as the Mammuthhöhle and the Hirlatzhöhle. Another significant tourist destination is the Eisriesenhöhle. The Dachstein is famous for its fossils, including megalodonts; the Linzer Weg leads over many such fossils, which are referred to as Kuhtritte ("cattle footprints").

Glaciers are uncommon in the Northern Limestone Alps, and those on the Dachstein — the Hallstätter Gletscher ("Hallstatt glacier"), the Großer Gosaugletscher ("great Gosau glacier") and the Schladminger Gletscher ("Schladming glacier") — are the largest, as well as being the northernmost and the easternmost in the whole of the Alps. Several smaller ice-fields also exist, such as the Kleine Gosaugletscher ("lesser Gosau glacier") and the Schneelochgletscher ("snow-hole glacier"). The glaciers are retreating rapidly, and may disappear entirely within 80 years. The Hallstatt glacier withdrew by 20 m in the year 2003 alone. By 2018, it is estimated that the glacier has retreated more than 1 km since 1908.

== Climbing ==
The summit was first reached on July 18, 1834, by Peter Karl Thurwieser, guided by the brothers Adam and Peter Gappmayr, via the Gosau glacier, after an earlier attempt by Erzherzog Karl via the Hallstätter glacier had failed. A wooden cross was erected at the summit during this ascent. The question of the first successful ascent has been a matter of controversial discussion even in contemporary newspaper articles. Two potential summit successes occurred in 1819 and 1823 by Jakob Buchsteiner, the latter of which is today thought to be the first ascent of neighbouring Torstein. The first person to reach the summit in winter was Friedrich Simony, on 14 January 1847. The sheer southern face was first climbed on 22 September 1909 by the brothers Irg and Franz Steiner.

Being the highest point of two different Bundesländer, the summit is a popular goal in both summer and winter. In fine weather as many as 100 climbers may be attempting the ascent, leading to congestion at key sections of the climb.

On 15 April 1954, during the Easter holiday 13 people from Heilbronn went missing in what is now known as the Dachstein hiking disaster.

== See also ==
- Limestone Alps
- List of mountains of the Alps
- List of European ultra prominent peaks
- List of World Heritage Sites in Austria
