= Dachstein Mountains =

Mountain range in Austria

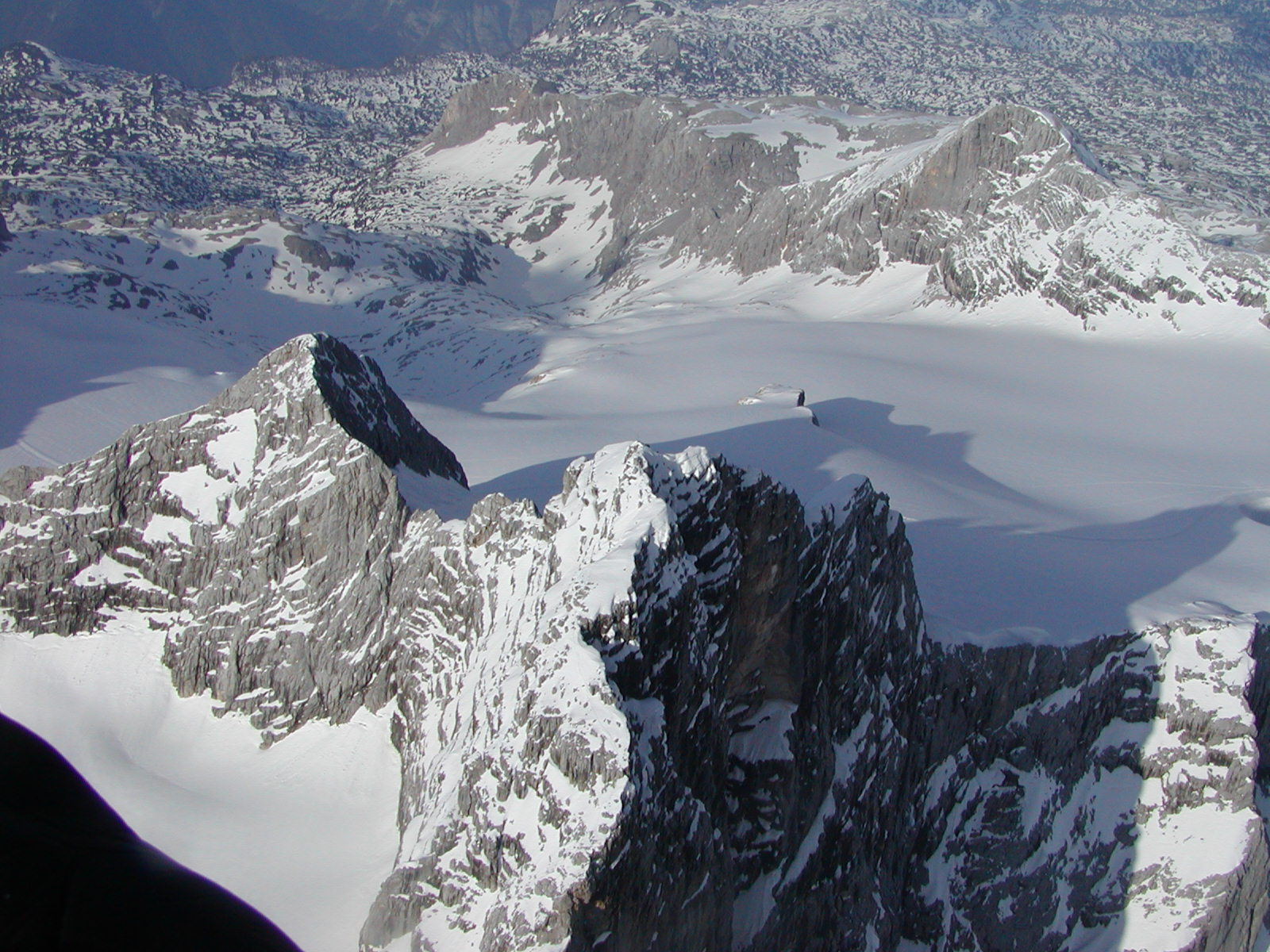
- Aerial shot of the Dachstein from ca. 3,600m. Left: the Lower Dachstein: Rear: the Gjaidstein

Highest point
- Peak: Hoher Dachstein
- Elevation: 2,995 m above sea level (AA)

Dimensions
- Length: 50 km (31 mi)

Geography
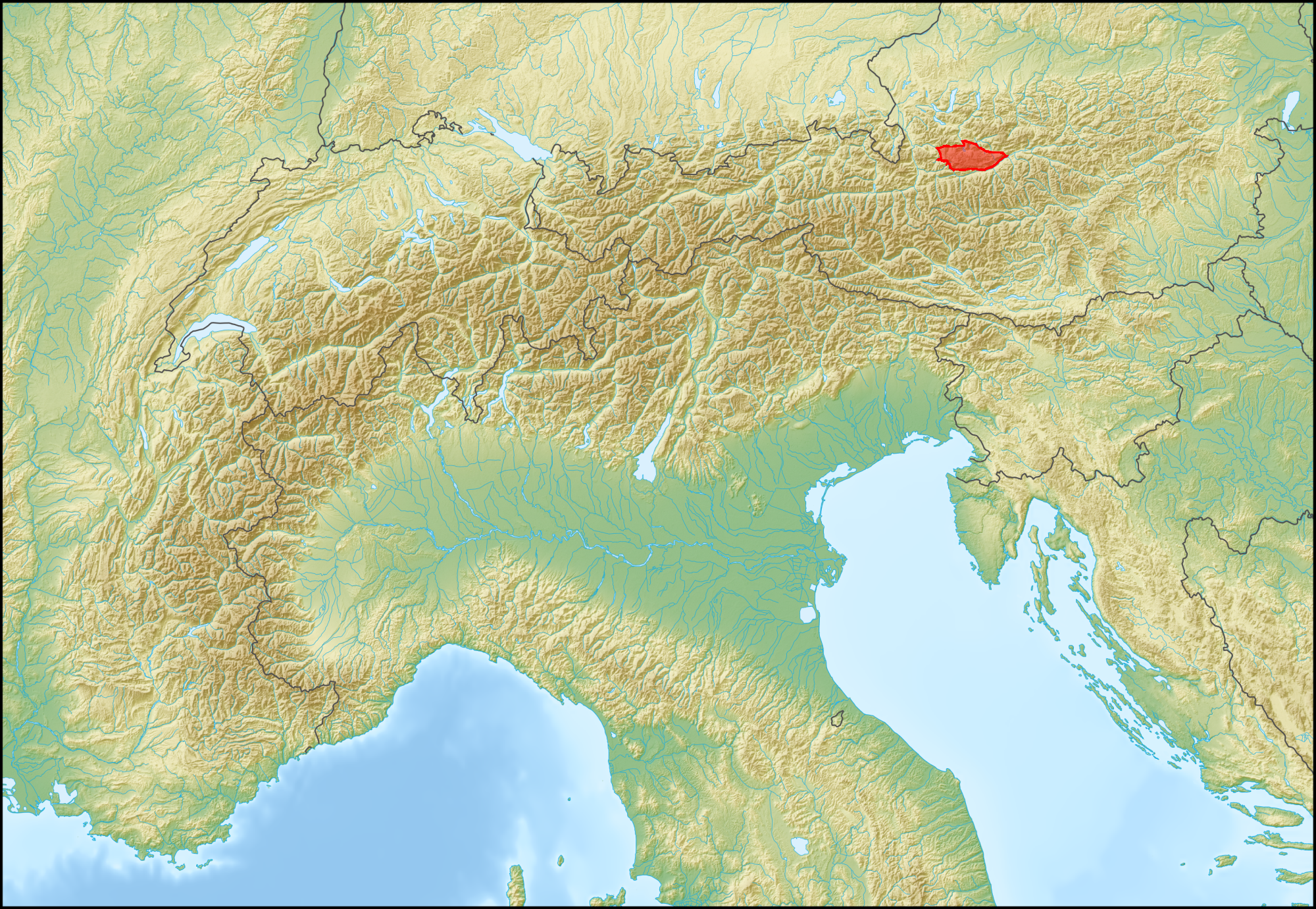
- Dachstein Mountains (in red) within the Alps. The borders of the range according to Alpine Club classification of the Eastern Alps
- Country: Austria
- States: Upper Austria, Styria and Salzburg
- Range coordinates: 47°31′N 13°40′E
- Parent range: Northern Limestone Alps

The Dachstein Mountains (German: Dachsteingebirge) are a mountain range in the Northern Limestone Alps.

The term is used by the Austrian Alpine Club in its classification of the Eastern Alps as one of the 24 sub-ranges of the Northern Limestone Alps (AVE No. 14).

The Dachstein range includes:

- The Dachstein Massif proper with its highest peak, the Hoher Dachstein (2,995 m (AA))
- Grimming (2,351 m above sea level (AA)) in the east to the upper Styrian Enns valley
- Sarstein (1,975 m above sea level (AA)) in the north at the other bank of the River Traun

== Extent ==
The Dachstein Mountains are bordered as follows:

- to the northeast by the Totes Gebirge, which is separated by the line from Sankt Agatha on the Hallstättersee – Pötschenhöhe – Bad Aussee – Kainischtraun – Bad Mitterndorf – Klachau – Grimmingbach to the River Enns
- to the south by the Rottenmanner und Wölzer Tauern and the Niedere Tauern, which are separated by the River Enns, roughly from Untergrimming to its confluence with the Weißenbach near Haus im Ennstal
- to the southwest by the Roßbrand in the Salzburg Slate Mountains along the line from Weißenbach – Ramsaubach – Schildlehenbach – Kalte Mandling – Warme Mandling – Marcheggsattel – Fritzbach – Linbach – Neubach to Lungötz in the Lammer valley
- to the west the Lammer valley forms the boundary of the mountains with the Tennengebirge
- to the northwest the Salzkammergut Mountains are separated by a line from Rußbach – Gschütt Pass – Gosaubach – Hallstätter See to Sankt Agatha

== Divisions ==
The two individual peaks of Grimming and Sarstein were counted as part of the Dachstein range because both have been broken off the Dachstein limestone block, even though they are quite separate from a hydrographic and orographic perspective. This classification appeared as early as 1924 in the Moriggl Division of the Alps.

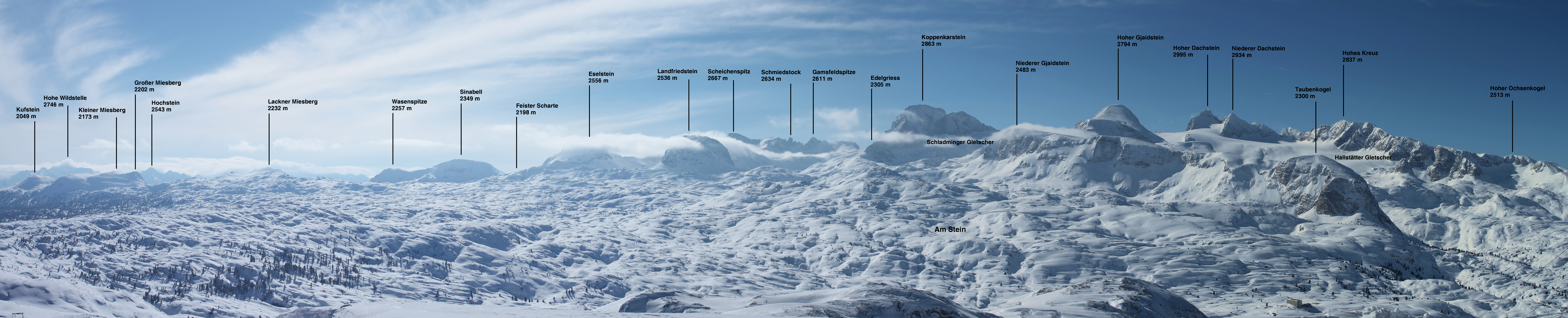
Panoramic view of the Dachstein with description of main peaks

== Climate ==
Climate data for Krippenstein
Month	Jan	Feb	Mar	Apr	May	Jun	Jul	Aug	Sep	Oct	Nov	Dec	Year
Record high °C (°F)	13.5 (56.3)	12.2 (54.0)	12.2 (54.0)	14.2 (57.6)	18.7 (65.7)	24.1 (75.4)	26.0 (78.8)	25.3 (77.5)	24.0 (75.2)	18.5 (65.3)	14.5 (58.1)	11.6 (52.9)	26.0 (78.8)
Mean daily maximum °C (°F)	−2.0 (28.4)	−2.6 (27.3)	−0.8 (30.6)	1.7 (35.1)	6.8 (44.2)	9.7 (49.5)	12.2 (54.0)	12.7 (54.9)	9.4 (48.9)	6.4 (43.5)	1.0 (33.8)	−1.0 (30.2)	4.5 (40.0)
Daily mean °C (°F)	−5.4 (22.3)	−6.1 (21.0)	−4.4 (24.1)	−1.9 (28.6)	3.3 (37.9)	5.9 (42.6)	8.4 (47.1)	8.9 (48.0)	5.7 (42.3)	2.8 (37.0)	−2.4 (27.7)	−4.3 (24.3)	0.9 (33.6)
Mean daily minimum °C (°F)	−8.2 (17.2)	−8.8 (16.2)	−6.9 (19.6)	−4.4 (24.1)	0.6 (33.1)	3.1 (37.6)	5.5 (41.9)	6.0 (42.8)	3.0 (37.4)	0.2 (32.4)	−5.1 (22.8)	−7.0 (19.4)	−1.8 (28.7)
Record low °C (°F)	−28.5 (−19.3)	−24.0 (−11.2)	−25.2 (−13.4)	−16.0 (3.2)	−11.0 (12.2)	−5.8 (21.6)	−3.2 (26.2)	−7.0 (19.4)	−7.2 (19.0)	−15.0 (5.0)	−20.0 (−4.0)	−24.0 (−11.2)	−28.5 (−19.3)
Average precipitation mm (inches)	112.5 (4.43)	110.1 (4.33)	160.3 (6.31)	132.7 (5.22)	140.4 (5.53)	219.3 (8.63)	257.8 (10.15)	211.3 (8.32)	155.7 (6.13)	104.1 (4.10)	124.9 (4.92)	123.7 (4.87)	1,852.8 (72.94)
Average snowfall cm (inches)	124.5 (49.0)	142.8 (56.2)	224.1 (88.2)	109.2 (43.0)	41.1 (16.2)	16.6 (6.5)	3.1 (1.2)	6.9 (2.7)	23.9 (9.4)	39.3 (15.5)	101.7 (40.0)	138.6 (54.6)	971.8 (382.5)
Average precipitation days (≥ 1 mm)	12.0	12.1	14.5	13.1	13.3	18.1	17.5	15.4	12.8	10.4	12.6	12.9	164.7
Average snowy days (≥ 1 cm)	31.0	28.3	31.0	30.0	28.0	12.4	2.5	1.5	5.9	11.9	24.8	30.7	238
Average relative humidity (%) (at 0700)	68.9	74.3	77.9	81.4	77.1	80.6	78.8	76.2	77.3	68.6	72.0	70.7	75.3
Mean monthly sunshine hours	114.3	125.7	143.6	145.4	204.7	173.2	193.4	205.2	168.4	166.2	102.9	98.5	1,841.5
Percentage possible sunshine	43.3	44.0	39.1	37.0	46.2	38.4	42.1	48.2	45.4	50.6	39.0	39.2	42.7
Source: zamg.ac.at
