= Silent Mouse =

1988 British film by Robin Crichton

Silent Mouse is a British 1988 television film directed and produced by Robin Crichton.

== Plot ==
In 1818, Oberndorf bei Salzburg, Austria, the church organ fails on Christmas Eve. The assistant priest Joseph Mohr and the church organist Franz Gruber writes the Christmas carol "Silent Night" which they and the church choir later perform at church accompanied by Mohr playing the guitar.

== Cast ==
- Richard Blane - Felix Gruber
- John Cairney - Father Ambrosius
- Gregor Fisher - Franz Gruber
- Phil McCall - Patter Nostler
- Bill McCue - Karl Maraycher
- Jack McKenzie - Joseph Mohr
- John Moore - King's Choirmaster
- Lynn Redgrave - Narrator
- Mary Riggans - Felix Gruber (voice)
- Zdenka Sajfertová - Mrs. Gruber

== Production ==
The film was produced by Edinburgh Film and Video productions for Channel 4 in association with PBS and Czechoslovak Television. It was filmed in Austria and Slovakia.

== Release ==
The film premiered on 25 December 1988 in the United Kingdom and in 1990 in the USA.

== See also ==
- The Legend of Silent Night (1968)
- Silent Night, Holy Night (1976)
