= The Legend of Silent Night =

- Directed by: Daniel Mann
- Starring: see below
- Narrated by: Kirk Douglas
- Country of origin: United States
- Original language: English

Production
- Running time: ca 2:00:00

Original release
- Network: ABC
- Release: December 25, 1968

The Legend of Silent Night is a 1968 American television film directed by Daniel Mann and starring James Mason, Kirk Douglas and John Leyton. The film premiered on ABC on December 25, 1968.

== Plot ==
In 1810, Pastor Josef Mohr writes a poem that he later shows to his friend, the local church organist Franz Gruber. Gruber composes music to the lyrics he was given, resulting in the classical Christmas carol "Silent Night".

== Cast ==
- James Mason as Franz Gruber
- Kirk Douglas as Narrator
- John Leyton as Pastor Joseph Mohr
- Claudia Butenuth as Gretchen
- Manfred Seipold as Ernst

== Production ==
The Legend of Silent Night was filmed in Salzburg and Vienna, Austria.

== See also ==
- Silent Night, Holy Night (1976)
- Silent Mouse (1988)
