= Silent Night Chapel =

Roman Catholic chapel in Oberndorf bei Salzburg, Austria

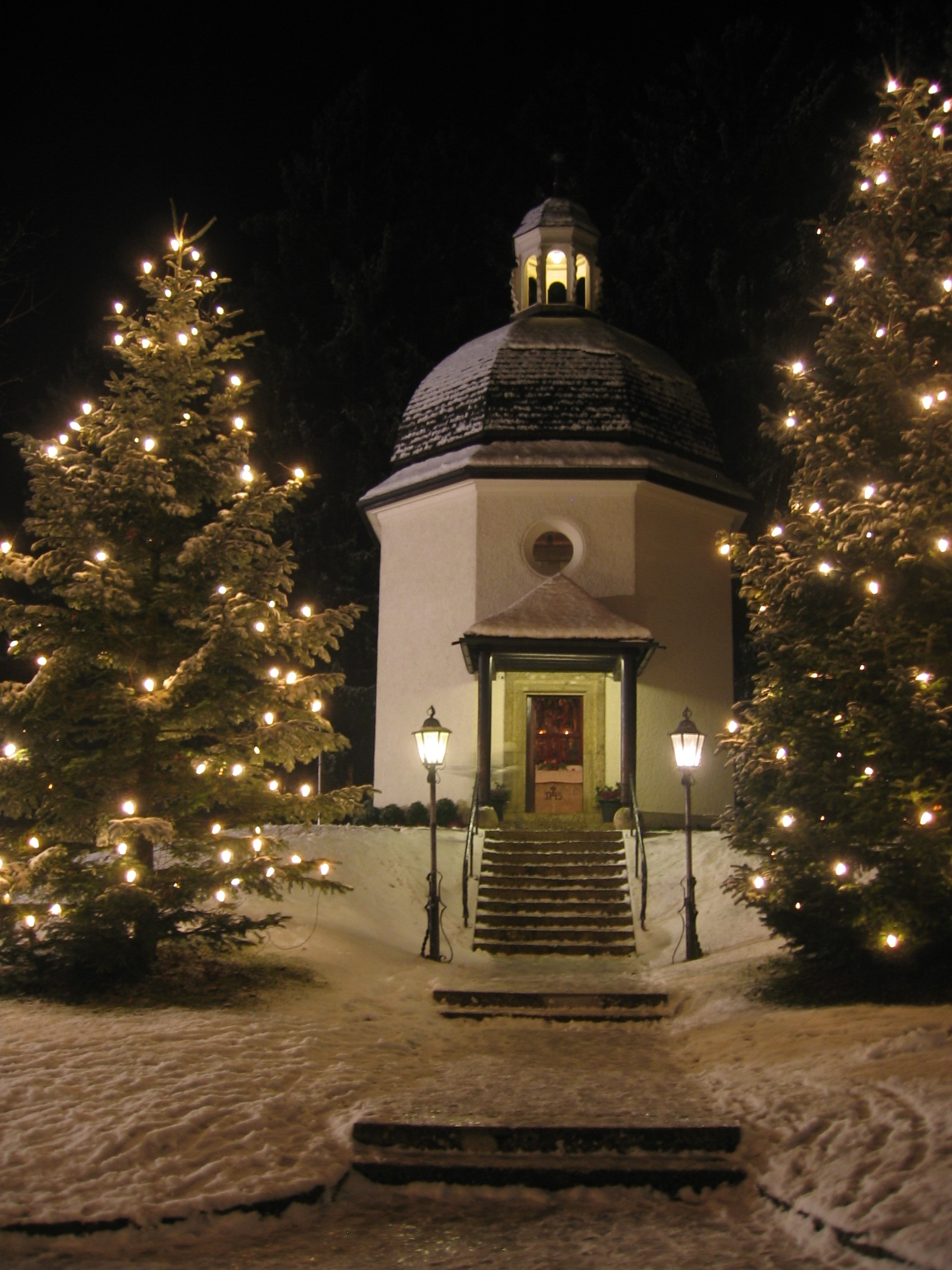

Religion
- Affiliation: Roman Catholic

Location
- Location: Oberndorf bei Salzburg, Austria
- Interactive map of Silent Night Chapel
- Coordinates: 47°56′44″N 12°56′11″E

Architecture
- Groundbreaking: 1924
- Completed: 1937

Website
- www.stillenacht.info

The Silent Night Chapel (German: Stille-Nacht-Kapelle) is located in the town of Oberndorf bei Salzburg in the Austrian province of Salzburg, and is a monument to the Christmas carol "Silent Night", its lyricist Joseph Mohr, and its composer Franz Xaver Gruber. The chapel stands on the site of the former Nikolauskirche, where on 24 December 1818, the Christmas carol was performed for the first time.

== History ==
The Catholic Nikolauskirche was damaged several times in the 1890s by flooding of the Salzach river, especially by the 1899 flood that severely impacted the Altach district and destroyed a large part of the town. This led to the decision that the whole of Oberndorf, including the parish church of St. Nicholas, would need to be rebuilt about 800 meters (0.5 mile) upstream.

Due to the high cost of repairs and the continued risk of flooding, the damaged St. Nicholas Church was not repaired. Instead, it was replaced in 1906 with a church in the new town center. In 1913 the old parish church was demolished and only a debris cone marked the location where the now-famous Christmas song was first performed.

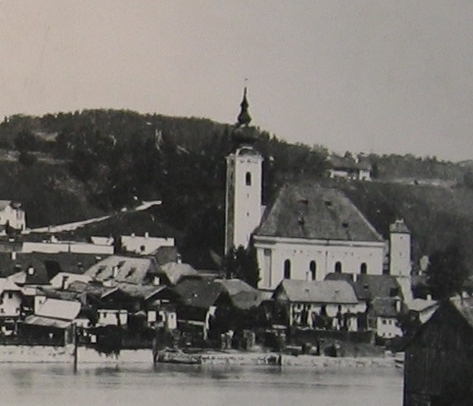
Old St. Nicholas Church

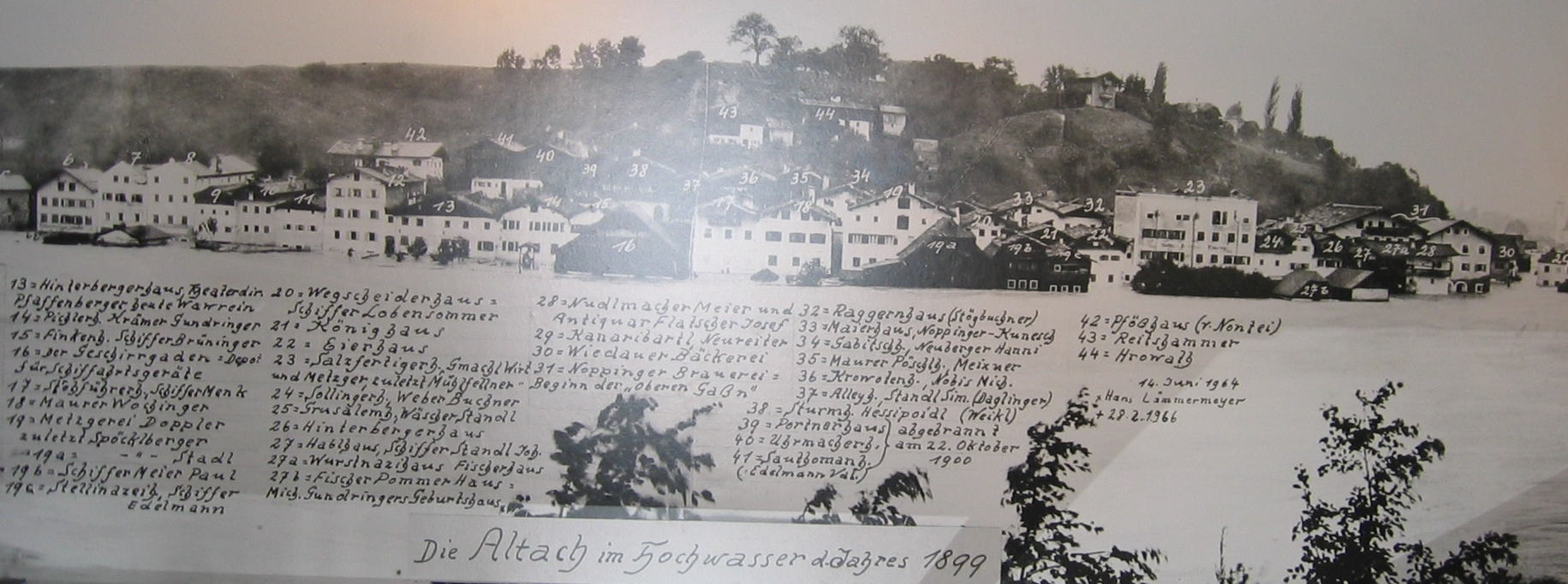
Flood of 1899

The 100th anniversary of the song in December 1918 fell at a difficult time immediately after World War I. Still, many of the citizens of Oberndorf wanted to honor the message of peace created by Mohr and Gruber. Begun in 1924, construction of a memorial chapel proceeded slowly under the difficult political and economic conditions of the First Austrian Republic. The chapel was eventually completed on 15 August 1937, the Feast of the Assumption. The Memorial Chapel ultimately became the visible symbol of the song "Silent Night".

Every year, especially at Christmas, thousands of people from around the world visit the Memorial Chapel and adjacent Museum. At 5:00 p.m. every 24 December, a solemn memorial mass is held at the church and guests thrill to the experience of hearing the famous carol sung in their many languages. Since 2002, this celebration has been transmitted by means of the local webcam on the Internet.

== Design ==
The chapel is an octagon in form with a bell helmet and a lantern, and the portal has a hipped roof canopy. The arched windows were created in 1935 by the Tyrolean Stained Glass. The high altar with a relief of the Nativity is by the sculptor Hermann Hutter, from 1915. The predella (altar base) relief of The Adoration of the Magi, The Crucifixion, The Flight into Egypt is by the sculptor Max Domenig, from 1936.

== Replicas ==
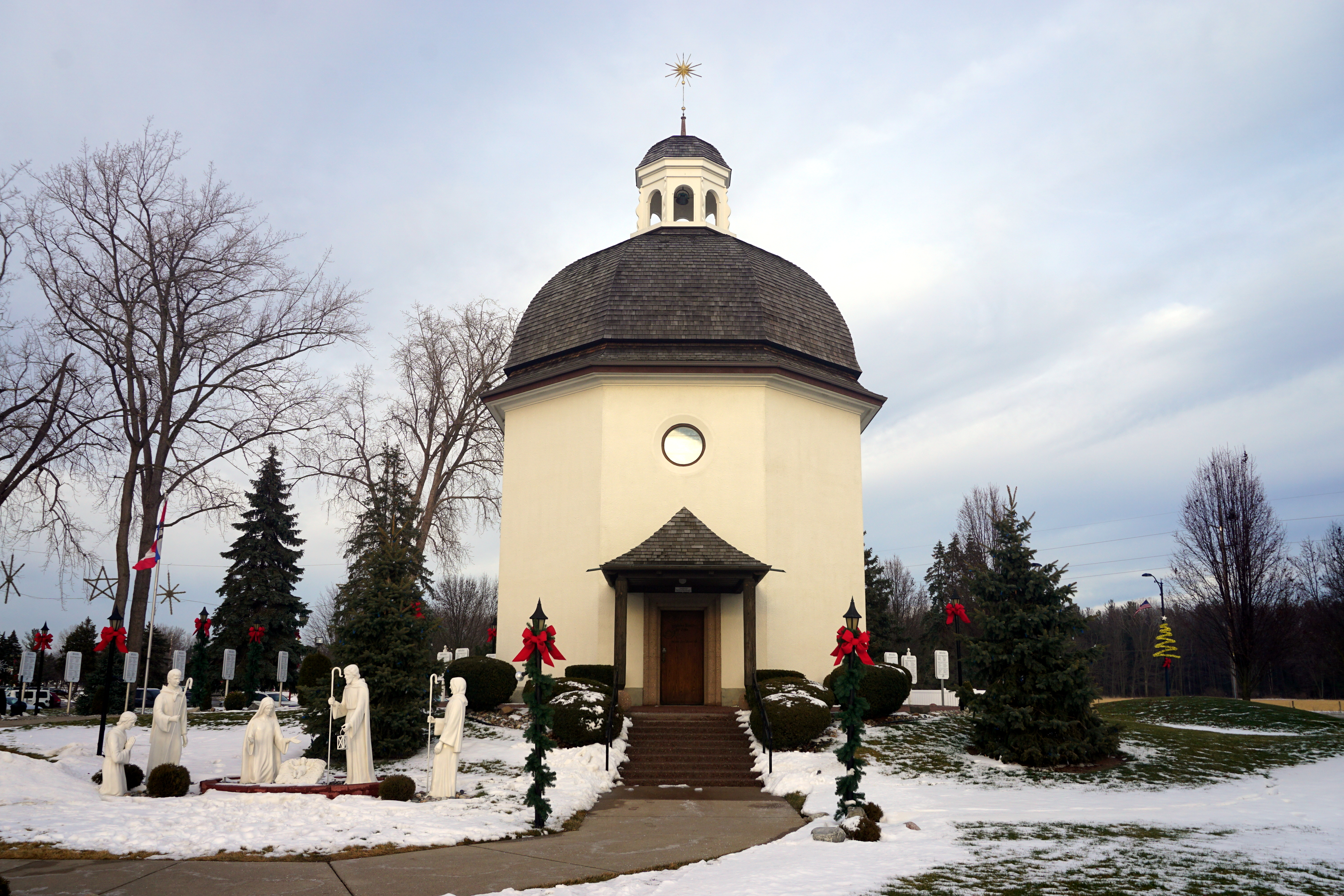
Silent Night Memorial Chapel in Frankenmuth, Michigan, a 1:1 scale recreation of the Silent Night Chapel

Replica models of the Silent Night Chapel exist in the Mini Mundus leisure park at Klagenfurt in Carinthia (1:25 scale) and the model park Mönichkirchen in Lower Austria. Furthermore, there is a 1:1 scale replica in Frankenmuth in the U.S. state of Michigan.
