= Claudia Butenuth =

German film and television actress

- Born: 20 September 1946; Göttingen, Germany
- Died: 1 September 2016 (aged 69)
- Occupation: Actress
- Years active: 1966-1995

Claudia Butenuth (20 September 1946 - September 1, 2016) was a German film and television actress.

== Filmography ==
Year	Title	Role	Notes
1968	Die goldene Pille	Bärbel	
1968	Im Schloß der blutigen Begierde	Marion von Kassell / Katharina Saxon	
1968	The Legend of Silent Night	Gretchen	TV movie
1971	The Last Valley	Helga	
1971	Wenn mein Schätzchen auf die Pauke haut	Hanni	
1971	Office Girls	Frau Dietz	
1972	Willi Manages The Whole Thing	Agnes	
1972	What Have You Done to Solange?	Brenda Pilchard	
1972	Trouble with Trixie	Holzapfel	
1975	Die Stadt im Tal	Edith	TV movie
1976	The Clown	Monika	
1976	Je t'aime moi non plus	Un cliente	
1976	I Want to Live	Eva Vrzal	
1978	Rhinegold	Reisende Mutter	
1978	Brass Target	Hilde	
1980	The American Success Company	Herman's secretary	
1982	Der Tod in der Waschstraße	Frau Randecker	
1984	Reserl am Hofe	Fürstin	
1988	Sommer	Ärztin	

== Bibliography ==
- Sweeney, Kevin. James Mason: A Bio-bibliography. Greenwood Publishing Group, 1999.
