= Hochburg-Ach =

- Municipality
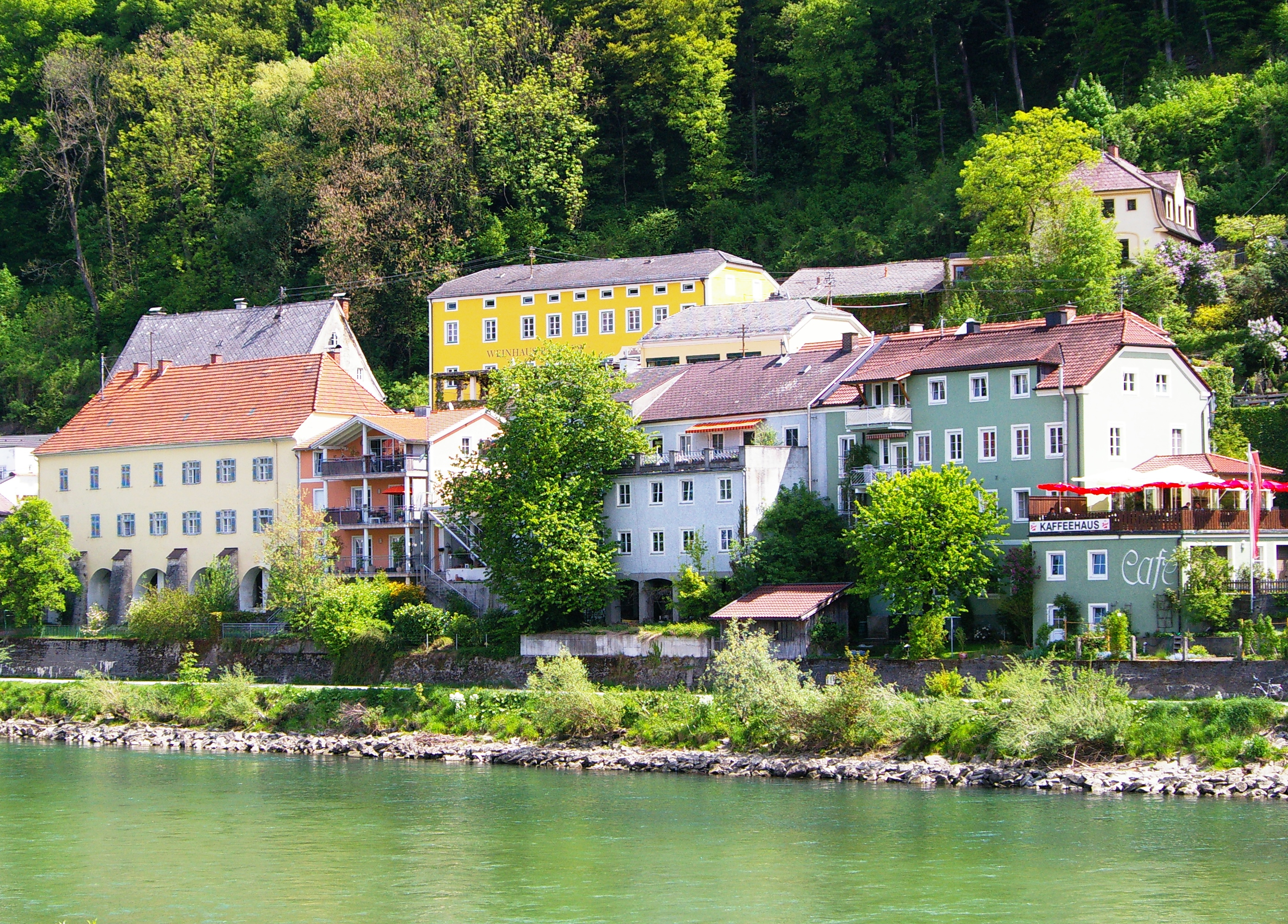
- Ach an der Salzach seen from Burghausen

- Coat of arms

- Location within Austria
- Coordinates: 48°07′50″N 12°52′40″E
- Country: Austria
- State: Upper Austria
- District: Braunau am Inn

Government
  - Mayor: Johann Reschenhofer (ÖVP)

Area
  - Total: 40.12 km^{2} (15.49 sq mi)
- Elevation: 462 m (1,516 ft)

Population (2018-01-01)
  - Total: 3,236
  - Density: 80.66/km^{2} (208.9/sq mi)
- Time zone: UTC+1 (CET)
  - Summer (DST): UTC+2 (CEST)
- Postal code: 5122
- Area code: 07727
- Vehicle registration: BR
- Website: www.hochburg-ach.at

Hochburg-Ach is a municipality in the district of Braunau am Inn in the Austrian state of Upper Austria.

== Geography ==
Hochburg-Ach lies in the Innviertel on the Germany border, directly opposite the Bavarian town of Burghausen. It lies east of the Salzach. About 42 percent of the municipality is forest and 52 percent farmland.

== Notable people ==
- Franz Xaver Gruber (1787–1863), primary school teacher, church organist and composer was born here.
