= Florian Wenninger =

Austrian historian

Florian Wenninger (born 5 July 1978, in Oberndorf bei Salzburg) is an Austrian historian, dedicating himself mainly to the history of totalitarian regimes in the 20th century.

After graduating from high school in 1998, Wenninger performed fourteen months of alternative civilian service at the Israeli Holocaust memorial Yad Vashem. He then studied political science and history and continued to volunteer with the Austrian Holocaust Memorial Service called Gedenkdienst, of which he was chairman from 2006 to 2010. After completing his diploma thesis under the supervision of Emmerich Tálos, for whom he also worked as a student assistant at the Institute of Political Science, Wenninger joined the Institute of Contemporary History at the University of Vienna in 2008. There, he subsequently worked as a University assistant (prae-doc) with Oliver Rathkolb until 2013. From 2013 to 2015, Wenninger coordinated a research project on political repression under Austrofascism and also taught at a Viennese secondary school. From 2015, he worked as a University assistant (post-doc) at the Institute of Contemporary History before becoming head of the Institut für Historische Sozialforschung (Institute for Historical Social Research), a non-university research institution in Vienna, in 2019. This was followed by research stays at Carnegie Mellon University in Pittsburgh and UC Berkeley in 2015 and 2016, and he was a Botstiber Visiting Professor at UC Berkeley in 2025. Wenninger is still associated with the Institute of Contemporary History at the University of Vienna as a Senior Research Fellow and also teaches there. In addition to contemporary Austrian history, his academic work focuses in particular on historical identities, the history of the labor movement as well as police and violence research. From 2011 to 2013, Wenninger was a member of a historical commission dealing with Viennese street names. He is the editor of several books, has published numerous essays and acts as a reviewer on various occasions. He is a member of the editorial board of the journal zeitgeschichte. In 2021, together with the historian Oliver Kühschelm, he founded the history education project wasbishergeschah. He regularly takes a stand in public debates on the subject of contemporary history. As a “staunch republican”, Wenninger advocated, among other things, a more critical approach to Austrofascism and a more rigid interpretation of the Adelsaufhebungsgesetzes (Law on the Abolition of Nobility). As part of a World Café on the referendum on compulsory military service in Austria in 2013, he advocated the retention of compulsory military service.

== Publications ==
As editor of books:

- Weltenwende? Der politische Umbruch 1918/19 und die Frage nach dem Wesen der "Österreichischen Revolution". [= Zeitgeschichte, Vol. 48, Issue 4, 2021]
- with Birgit Nemec: Geschichtspolitik im öffentlichen Raum. Zur Benennung und Umbenennung von Straßen im internationalen Vergleich. [= Zeitgeschichte, Vol. 46, Issue 1, 2019]
- with Jürgen Pfeffer: Sabotage und Psychologische Kriegsführung. Ein Handbuch. Czernin, Wien 2018.
- with Jutta Fuchshuber: "Ich bin also nun ein anderer". Die jüdische Bevölkerung der Wieden 1938-1945. Trotzdem, Wien 2017.
- with Lucile Dreidemy et al.: Bananen, Cola, Zeitgeschichte. Oliver Rathkolb und das Lange 20. Jahrhundert [= Festschrift aus Anlass des 60. Geburtstags von Oliver Rathkolb], 2 Vol. Böhlau, Wien / Köln / Weimar 2015.
- with Peter Autengruber, Birgit Nemec, Oliver Rathkolb: Umstrittene Wiener Straßennamen. Ein kritisches Lesebuch. Pichler, Wien / Graz / Klagenfurt 2014.
- with Lucile Dreidemy: Das Dollfuß/Schuschnigg-Regime 1933–1938. Vermessung eines Forschungsfeldes. Böhlau, Wien-Köln-Weimar 2013.
- with Peter Pirker: Wehrmachtsjustiz. Kontext – Praxis – Nachwirkungen. Verlag Braumüller, Wien 2011.
- with Paul Dvorak and Katharina Kuffner: Geschichte macht Herrschaft. Zur Politik mit dem Vergangenen. Verlag Braumüller, Wien 2007.

Major articles in books and magazines:

- "Sie glauben, mit unseren Toten ihre Weinberge düngen zu können!" – Ignaz Seipel in der Wahrnehmung der österreichischen Sozialdemokratie. In: Michaela Sohn-Kronthaler, Markus Zimmermann (ed.): Ignaz Seipel (1876-1932) im Spannungsfeld von Kirche, Partei und Politik. Wien 2024, pp. 279–302.
- Das weite Feld der Polizeiforschung. Eine methodologische Reflexion in Anlehnung an die Kolloquien zur Polizeigeschichte als sozial- und kulturwissenschaftliches Forum. In: Barbara Stelzl-Marx, Andreas Kranebitter, Gregor Holzinger (Hrsg.): Exekutive der Gewalt. Die österreichische Polizei und der Nationalsozialismus. Wien 2024, pp. 695–703.
- Zur Genese des Arbeitsverfassungsgesetzes 1973. Ein historischer Rückblick aus Anlass des 50. Jahrestages der Beschlussfassung im Nationalrat. In: Rudolf Mosler (Hrsg.): 50 Jahre Arbeitsverfassungsgesetz. Wien 2024, pp. 19–31.
- On the Role and Patterns of Female (Protest) Action in the February Uprising of 1934. In: Frank Jacob, Jowan A. Mohammed (Ed.): Gender and Protest. On the Historical and Contemporary Interrelation of two Social Phenomena. Berlin / Boston 2023, pp. 149–179.
- "Eine krankhafte Erscheinung […] im Programm der sonst so tüchtigen und vortrefflichen Christlichsozialen Partei." Antisemitismus im Politischen Katholizismus vom Fin de Siècle bis zum Austrofaschismus. In: Linda Erker, Michael Rosecker (Hrsg.): Antisemitische und rechte Netzwerke in der Zwischenkriegszeit. Zur Bedeutung informeller Machtstrukturen für die politische Radikalisierung in Österreich. Wien 2023, pp. 75–103.
- "… für die Welle der Erneuerung kein besserer Sammelbegriff". Die österreichische Diktatur 1933-1938 und das Faschismus-Paradigma. In: Carlo Moos (Hrsg.): (K)ein Austrofaschismus? Studien zum Herrschaftssystem 1933-1938. Wien 2021, pp. 71–90.
- "… eine Bonzenpartei, in der die Söhne Judas das große Wort führen". Hypothesen zu den Ursachen der katholischen Abneigung gegen die österreichische Sozialdemokratie vor 1933. In: Franz Gmainer-Pranzl, Martin Jäggle, Anna Wall-Strasser (Hrsg.): Katholische Kirche und Sozialdemokratie in Österreich. Ein (selbst-)kritischer Blick auf Geschichte und Gegenwart. Wien 2021, pp. 35–74.
- Austrofaschismus. In: Marcus Gräser, Dirk Rupnow (Hrsg.): Österreichische Zeitgeschichte – Zeitgeschichte in Österreich. Eine Standortbestimmung in Zeiten des Umbruchs. Wien 2021, pp. 67–107.
- with Hendrik Wagenaar: Deliberative Policy Analysis, Interconnectedness and Institutional Design: Lessons from "Red Vienna". In: Policy Studies. Vol. 41, Issue 4, 2020, pp. 411–437.
- "Ein Brückenkopf des Deutschtums in Südost?" Die Schwarze Reichswehr in Österreich 1919–1922. In: Adrian Hänni, Daniel Rickenbacher, Thomas Schmutz (Hrsg.): Über Grenzen hinweg. Transnationale politische Gewalt im 20. Jahrhundert. Frankfurt 2020, pp. 91–123.
- "The Duty to Express Value Judgments". Charles Adams Gulick, Interwar Austria and the Question of Political Neutrality as a Scholarly Virtue. In: Contemporary Austrian Studies. Vol. 28, 2019, pp. 241–279.
- Widmung und Umwidmung öffentlicher Räume. Eine Analyse des Spektrums der Debatten in österreichischen Gemeinden. In: Zeitgeschichte. 46. Jahrgang, Heft 1, 2019, pp. 111–139.
- "... für das ganze christliche Volk eine Frage auf Leben und Tod." Anmerkungen zu Wesen und Bedeutung des christlichsozialen Antisemitismus bis 1934. In: Gertrude Enderle-Burcel, Ilse Reiter-Zatloukal (Hrsg.): Antisemitismus in Österreich 1933–1938, Wien 2018, pp. 195–235.
- Genosse ex negativo? Hypothesen zum Verhältnis von Karl Kraus und der österreichischen Sozialdemokratie. In: Katharina Prager (Hrsg.): Geist versus Zeitgeist: Karl Kraus in der Ersten Republik. Wien 2018, pp. 60–79.
- Der Faschist als Alien. Eine Reflexion der drei-Lager-Theorie am Beispiel der österreichischen Heimwehren. In: Werner Anzenberger, Heimo Halbrainer (Hrsg.): Unrecht im Sinne des Rechtsstaates. Die Steiermark im Austrofaschismus. Graz 2014, pp. 47–67.
- Austrian Missions – Das Problem der politischen Äquidistanz der Forschung am Beispiel Austrofaschismus. In: Ilse Reiter, Christiane Rothländer, Pia Schölnberger (Hrsg.): Österreich 1933-1938. Interdisziplinäre Bestandsaufnahmen und Perspektiven. Wien 2012, pp. 257–272.
- Geschichte zwischen "Aufarbeitung" und Vermittlung. Überlegungen anhand eines Exempels, In: Bundesjugendvertrung (Hg.) 2010: Geraubte Kindheit. Kinder und Jugendliche im Nationalsozialismus, Wien, pp. 197–212.
- Die Wohnung des Rottenführers D. Über Opferfokus und Täterabsenz in der zeitgeschichtlichen Vermittlungsarbeit. In: Hilmar, Till (Hg.) 2010: Ort, Subjekt, Verbrechen. Koordinaten historisch-politischer Bildungsarbeit zum Nationalsozialismus, Wien, pp. 54–74.
- Projektarbeit und externe Kooperationen in der historisch-politischen Bildungsarbeit mit Jugendlichen. Ein Werkstattbericht des Vereins Gedenkdienst, In: Jahrbuch 2010, Dokumentationsarchiv des österreichischen Widerstandes, pp. 66–88.
- Aus Zeitgeschichte wird Geschichte. Zu Möglichkeiten und Grenzen der Arbeit mit Jugendlichen in der KZ-Gedenkstätte Mauthausen. In: Bauer, Christa/Baumgartner, Andreas/Mernyi, Willi (Hg.) 2009: Nichts als alte Mauern. Sinn und Möglichkeiten von KZ-Gedenkstättenbesuchen und Dokumentation eines erfolgreichen Modellprojektes, vol. 1, pp. 15–26.
- Zwischen Verantwortung, Schuld und Sühne. Der österreichische Gedenkdienst und die deutsche Aktion Sühnezeichen als Formen nichtstaatlicher Geschichtspolitik. In: Austriaca, December 2009, No. 69, pp. 87–112.
- Der Bürgerkrieg in den Köpfen. Die Deutungsmuster der sozialdemokratischen Führung nach der Niederlage im Februar 1934. In: Juridikum 01/2009, pp. 44–47.
- Februarerinnerung. Der österreichische Bürgerkrieg im historischen Gedächtnis der Zweiten Republik. In: Kienesberger, Klaus et alii (Hg.): unSICHTBAR. Widerständiges im Salzkammergut, Wien, pp. 68–81.
- Die Rettung des Vaterlandes oder vom Wesen der "Reinen Demokratie". In: Betrifft Widerstand, Nr. 87, Juni 2008, pp. 4–10.
- Nachbarliche Raubzüge – die "Arisierungen" im 15. Bezirk. In: Kofler, Michael/ Pühringer, Judith/Traska, Georg 2008: Das Dreieck meiner Kindheit. Eine jüdische Vorstadtgemeinde in Wien, Wien, pp. 148–169.
