= Silent Night =

1818 Christmas carol

Stille Nacht Silent Night
- Christmas carol
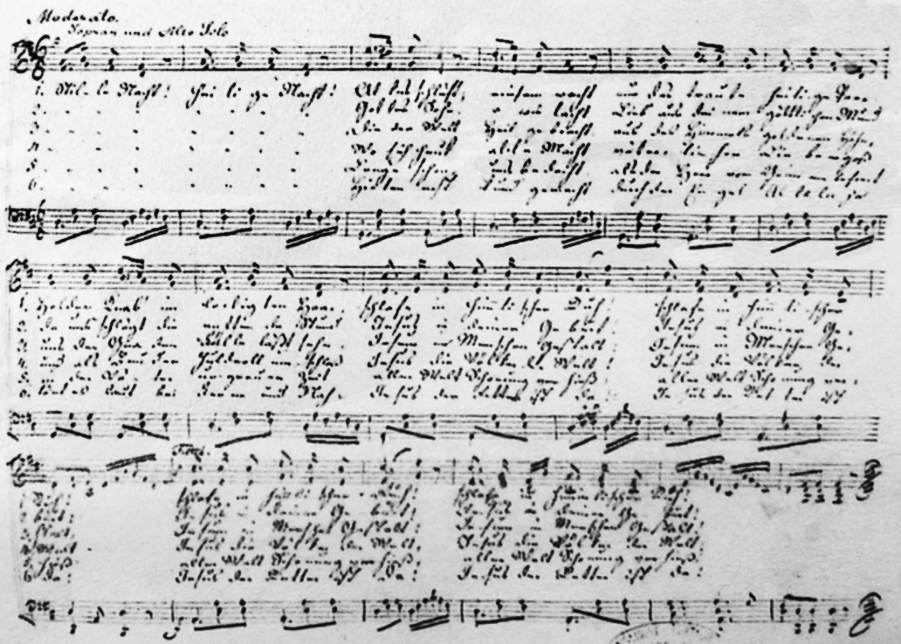
- Autograph (c. 1860) of the carol by Franz Gruber
- Native name: Stille Nacht, heilige Nacht
- Full title: Silent Night, Holy Night
- Text: Joseph Mohr
- Language: German
- Melody: Franz Xaver Gruber
- Performed: 24 December 1818
- Published: 1833

"Silent Night" (German: "Stille Nacht, heilige Nacht") is a popular Christmas carol, composed in 1818 by Franz Xaver Gruber to lyrics by Joseph Mohr in Oberndorf bei Salzburg, Austria. It was declared an intangible cultural heritage by UNESCO in 2011. The song was first recorded in 1905 and has remained a popular success, appearing in films and multiple successful recordings, as well as being quoted in other musical compositions. It is one of the most recorded Christmas songs, with more than 137,000 known recordings.

== Creation ==
Father Joseph Mohr, a young Catholic priest, had come to Oberndorf in 1817. In the aftermath of the Napoleonic Wars, he had written the poem "Stille Nacht" in 1816 at Mariapfarr, the home town of his father in the Salzburg Lungau region, where Joseph had worked as an assistant priest.

The melody was composed by Franz Xaver Gruber, schoolmaster and organist in the nearby village of Arnsdorf, now part of Lamprechtshausen. On Christmas Eve, 1818, Mohr brought the words to Gruber and asked him to compose a melody and guitar accompaniment for that night's mass, after river flooding had possibly damaged the church organ. The church was eventually destroyed by repeated flooding and replaced with the Silent-Night-Chapel.

"Stille Nacht" was first performed on Christmas Eve, 1818, at the Nikolauskirche, the parish church of Oberndorf, a village in the Austrian Empire on the Salzach river in present-day Austria.

== Subsequent history ==
According to Gruber, Karl Mauracher, an organ builder who serviced the instrument at the Oberndorf church, was enamoured of the song, and took the composition home with him to the Zillertal. From there, two travelling families of folk singers, the Strassers and the Rainers, included the tune in their shows. The Rainers were already singing it around Christmas 1819, and they once performed it for an audience that included Franz I of Austria and Alexander I of Russia, as well as making the first performance of the song in the U.S., in New York City in 1839. By the 1840s the song was well known in Lower Saxony and was reported to be a favourite of Frederick William IV of Prussia. During this period, the melody changed slightly to become the version that is commonly played today.

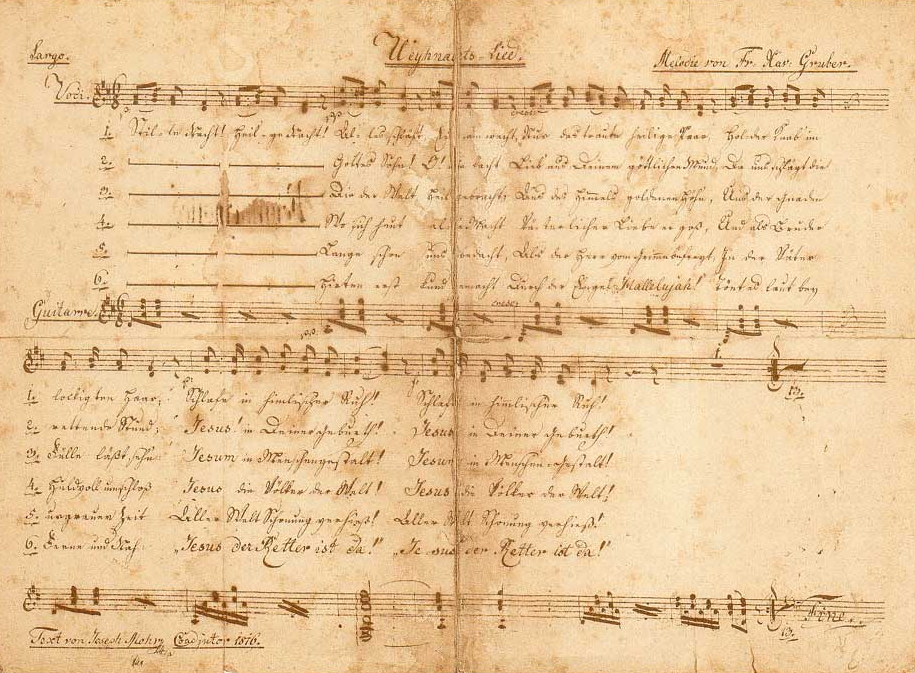
Mohr's autograph, 1820/1825

In 1995, a manuscript was discovered in Mohr's handwriting and dated by researchers as c. 1820. It revealed that Mohr wrote the words in 1816 when he was assigned to a pilgrim church in Mariapfarr, Austria, and shows that the music was composed by Gruber in 1818. This is the earliest manuscript that exists and the only one in Mohr's handwriting. Prior to this, it was long attributed to more famous Austrian composers including Haydn, Mozart and Schubert.

Original melody

The first edition was published by Friese in 1833 in a collection of Four Genuine Tyrolean Songs, with the following musical text:

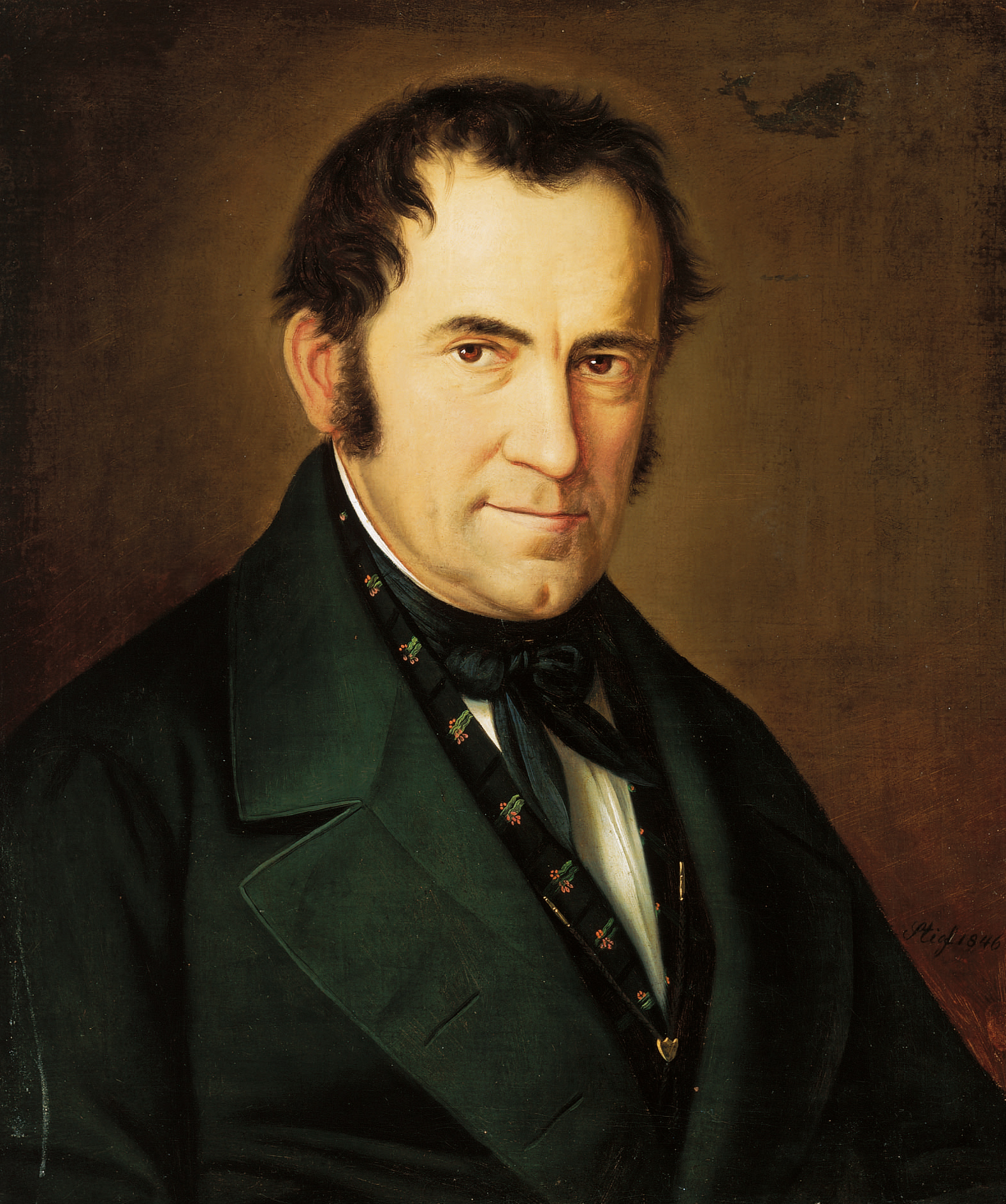
Franz Xaver Gruber, painted by Sebastian Stief (1846)

The contemporary version, as in the choral example below, is:

== Translations ==
In 1859, the Episcopal priest John Freeman Young, then serving at Trinity Church, New York City, wrote and published the English translation that is most frequently sung today, translated from three of Mohr's original six verses. The version of the melody that is generally used today is a slow, meditative lullaby or pastorale, differing slightly (particularly in the final strain) from Gruber's original, which was a "moderato" tune in 6/8 time and siciliana rhythm. Today, the lyrics and melody are in the public domain, although newer translations usually are not.

In 1998, the Silent Night Museum in Salzburg commissioned a new English translation by Bettina Klein of Mohr's German lyrics. For the most part, Klein preserves both Young's translation and the interpretive decisions that inform his word-choices. Yet Klein also attempts occasionally to restore Mohr's original phrasing, changing, for instance, Young's "Holy infant, so tender and mild" to Mohr's "Holy infant with curly hair" (Holder Knab' im lockigten Haar). However, she continues to interpret Mohr's traute heilige Paar as referring to Mary and the baby, whereas Mohr's use of the word traute can mean "espoused," thus suggesting perhaps that the "holy pair" represents Mary and Joseph watching (picking up Mohr's wacht) over the curly-haired infant/boy.

The carol has been translated into about 300 languages.

== Lyrics ==
"Silent Night"
Choral version performed by the United States Army Chorus

"Stille Nacht, heilige Nacht"
Solo performed by Ernestine Schumann-Heink

"Silent Night"
Instrumental version played on piano by Kevin MacLeod in 2000

German lyrics

Stille Nacht, heilige Nacht,
Alles schläft; einsam wacht
Nur das traute hochheilige Paar.
Holder Knabe im lockigen Haar,
Schlaf in himmlischer Ruh!
Schlaf in himmlischer Ruh!

Stille Nacht, heilige Nacht,
Hirten erst kundgemacht
Durch der Engel Halleluja,
Tönt es laut von fern und nah:
Christ, der Retter ist da!
Christ, der Retter ist da!

Stille Nacht, heilige Nacht,
Gottes Sohn, o wie lacht
Lieb' aus deinem göttlichen Mund,
Da uns schlägt die rettende Stund'.
Christ, in deiner Geburt!
Christ, in deiner Geburt!

Young's English lyrics

Silent night! Holy night!
All is calm, all is bright
Round yon virgin mother and child!
Holy infant, so tender and mild,
Sleep in heavenly peace!
Sleep in heavenly peace!

Silent night! Holy night!
Shepherds quake at the sight!
Glories stream from heaven afar,
Heavenly hosts sing Alleluia!
Christ the Saviour is born!
Christ the Saviour is born!

Silent night! Holy night!
Son of God, love's pure light
Radiant beams from thy holy face
With the dawn of redeeming grace,
Jesus, Lord, at thy birth!
Jesus, Lord, at thy birth!

In the second stanza, some English versions read "shepherds quail" rather than "shepherds quake."

A common fourth verse or alternative third verse is:

Silent night, holy night,
wondrous star, lend thy light;
with the angels let us sing,
Alleluia to our King;
Christ the Saviour is born,
Christ the Saviour is born!

== Musical settings ==
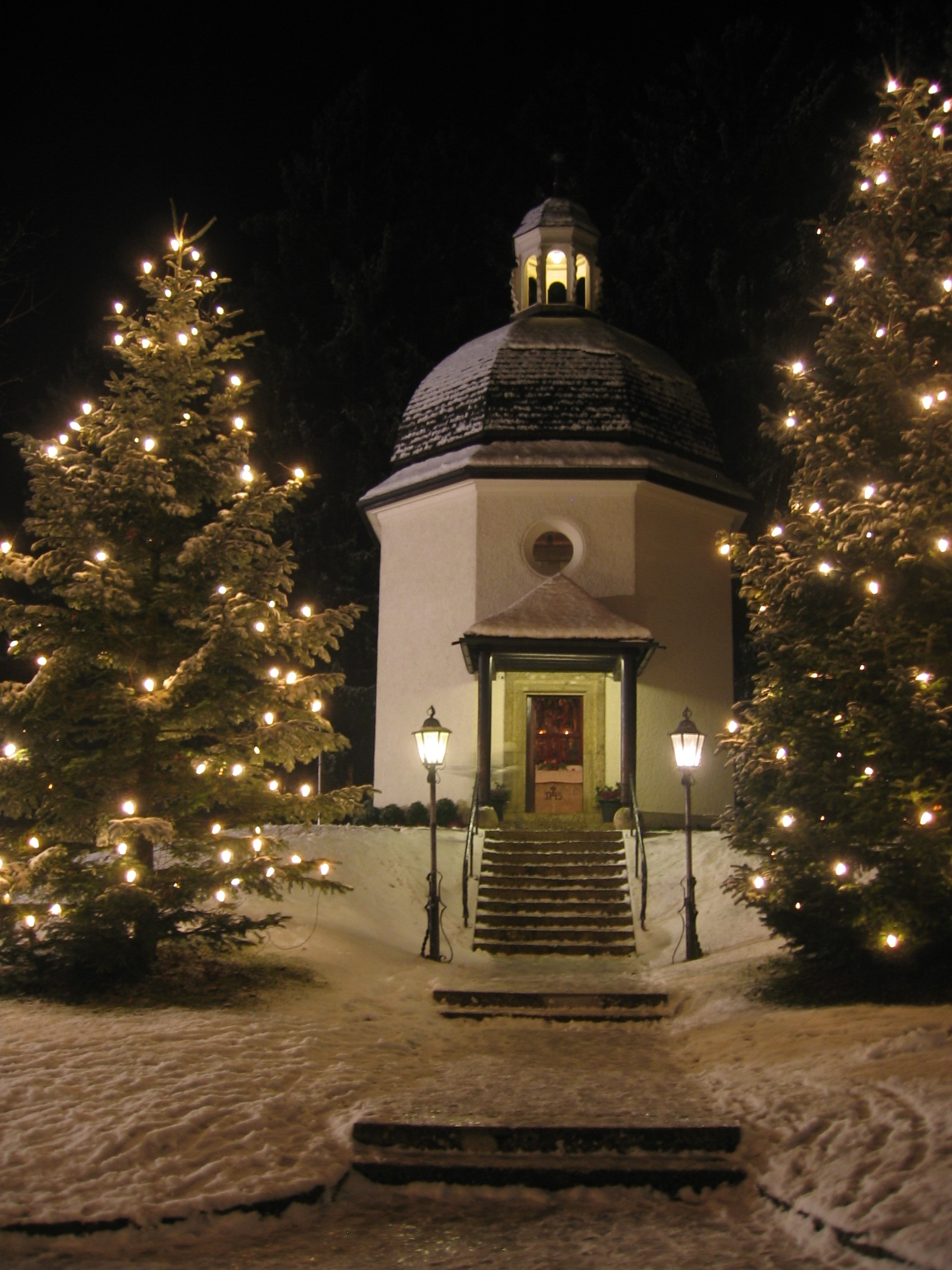
Silent-Night-Chapel in Oberndorf on the site where the song was first performed.

The carol was arranged by various composers, such as Carl Reinecke, Gustav Schreck, Eusebius Mandyczewski, Malcolm Sargent, David Willcocks, Charles Mackerras, Philip Ledger, John Rutter, Stephen Cleobury, Jacob de Haan and Taylor Scott Davis.

Max Reger quotes the tune in the Christmas section of his organ pieces Sieben Stücke, Op. 145.

Alfred Schnittke composed an arrangement of "Stille Nacht" for violin and piano in 1978, as a holiday greeting for violinist Gidon Kremer. Due to its dissonant and nightmarish character, the miniature caused a scandal in Austria.

== In film ==
Several theatrical and television films depict how the song was ostensibly written. Most of them report the organ breaking down at the church in Oberndorf, which appeared in a fictional story published in the U.S. in the 1930s.

- The Legend of Silent Night (1968) TV film directed by Daniel Mann
- Silent Night, Holy Night (1976) animated short film by Hanna-Barbera.
- Silent Mouse (1988) television special directed and produced by Robin Crichton and narrated by Lynn Redgrave.
- Buster & Chauncey's Silent Night (1998) direct-to-video animated feature
- Silent Night (2012) directed by Christian Vuissa
- The First Silent Night (2014), documentary narrated by Simon Callow
- Stille Nacht – ein Lied für die Welt (2018), music documentary created and directed by Hannes M. Schalle, narrated by Peter Simonischek. An English version, Silent Night – A Song for the World (2020), narrated by Hugh Bonneville, was released two years later.

== On record charts ==
Various recordings of "Silent Night" have reached the record charts in various countries. These include:

- 1969–1979: Percy Sledge No. 10 on the Dutch Charts
- 1972–1973: Tom Tomson No. 21 on the Belgium Ultratop Flanders chart and No. 10 on its Wallonia chart
- 1975–1976: The Cats No. 10 on the Dutch Charts
- 1987: Argentine post-punk band Sumo cover version is one of the most popular Christmas songs on Spotify Argentina 2025
- 1991–1992: Sinéad O'Connor No. 71 on the Dutch Charts
- 1993: Enya No. 48 on the Australian Charts with an Irish language version of the song.
- 2007–2008: Josh Groban No. 5 on the Norwegian Charts and No. 19 on the U.S. Billboard Adult Contemporary Chart
- 2008: Glasvegas No. 42 on the Swedish Charts
- 2009: Mariah Carey No. 67 on the U.S. Billboard Digital Song Sales Chart
- 2010: Rene Kirby and Ryne Sandberg in American version of Silent Night (sung by Living Voices)
- 2011: The Temptations No. 27 on the U.S. Billboard Holiday 100 chart.
- 2013–2014: Elvis Presley No. 120 on the French Charts
- 2013–2014: Nat King Cole No. 125 on the French Charts
- 2017: The Temptations No. 11 on the Swedish Heatseeker (Sverigetopplistan) charts

== See also ==
- List of Christmas carols
