= Oberndorf bei Salzburg =

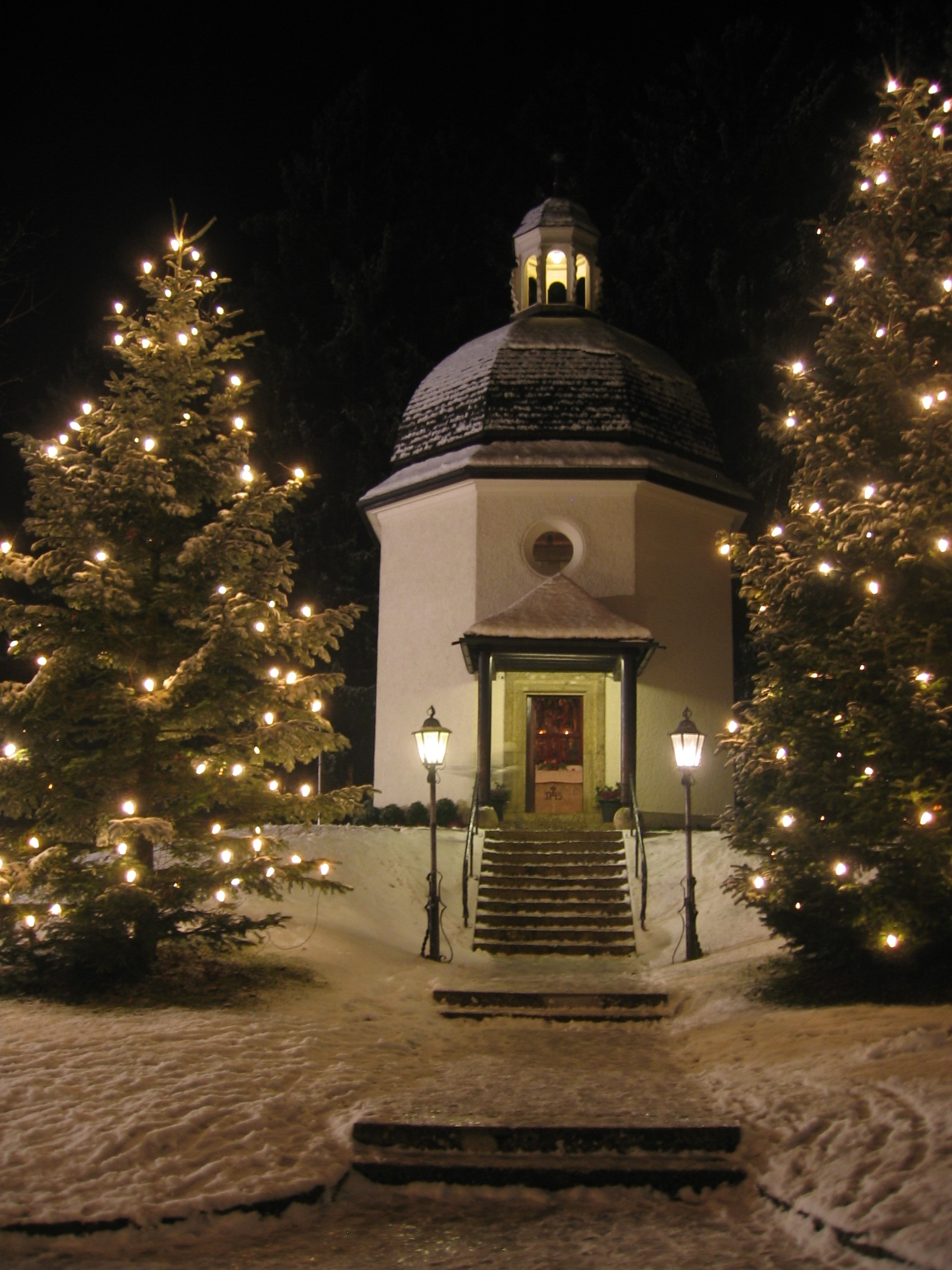
- Silent-Night-Chapel

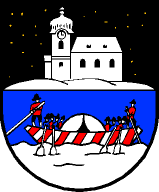
- Coat of arms

- Location within Austria
- Coordinates: 47°56′30″N 12°56′30″E
- Country: Austria
- State: Salzburg
- District: Salzburg-Umgebung

Government
  - Mayor: Georg Djundja (SPÖ)

Area
  - Total: 4.55 km^{2} (1.76 sq mi)
- Elevation: 401 m (1,316 ft)

Population (2018-01-01)
  - Total: 5,815
  - Density: 1,280/km^{2} (3,310/sq mi)
- Time zone: UTC+1 (CET)
  - Summer (DST): UTC+2 (CEST)
- Postal code: 5110
- Area code: 06272
- Vehicle registration: SL
- Website: https://www.oberndorf.salzburg.at/

Oberndorf bei Salzburg (Austrian German pronunciation: [ˈoːbɐndɔrf baɪ ˈsaltsbʊrɡ], lit. 'Oberndorf near Salzburg'; Central Bavarian: Owerndorf ba Såizburg) is a small city in the Austrian state of Salzburg, about 17 km (11 mi) north of the City of Salzburg. It is situated on the river Salzach in the Flachgau district. Town privileges were granted on 30 April 2001.

== History ==
The town across the Salzach is Laufen in Bavaria. The town was split in two in the wake of the Napoleonic Wars when the former Principality of the Salzburg Archbishops was divided in 1816 following the Congress of Vienna into a part taken by the Kingdom of Bavaria and a part taken by the Austrian Empire.

=== Silent Night ===
Oberndorf is famous worldwide as the birthplace of the carol Silent Night (German: Stille Nacht), which was first performed at Nikolauskirche, then the parish church, by the schoolmaster Franz Xaver Gruber and the young priest Joseph Mohr on Christmas Eve 1818, from where it spread out to the world. As in the 1890s several floods of the Salzach River destroyed large parts of Oberndorf, the church was finally demolished and a memorial chapel erected on its site in 1937. A full-scale replica of the memorial chapel, built in 1992, can be found in Frankenmuth, Michigan.

== Transport ==
Oberndorf can be reached from Salzburg by S-Bahn rapid transit railway and the B 156 Lamprechtshausener Straße federal highway running from Salzburg toward Braunau am Inn.

== Personalities ==
- Leopold Kohr (1909–1994), economist, was born in Oberndorf
- Benita Ferrero-Waldner (born 1948), diplomat
- Florian Wenninger (born 1978), historian
- Dominik Kraihamer (born 1989), racing driver
- René Marić (born 1992), football manager

== See also ==
- Salzburg
- Salzburgerland
