= Nikolauskirche, Oberndorf =

Former parish church in Austria

Nikolauskirche
- Schifferkirche St. Nikola
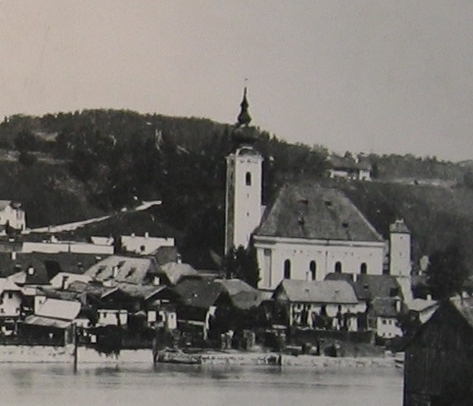
- The parish church on a historic photograph
- Nikolauskirche
- 47°56′44″N 12°56′11″E
- Location: Oberndorf bei Salzburg, Austria
- Denomination: Roman Catholic

History
- Dedication: Saint Nicholas
- Consecrated: 1798

Architecture
- Style: Baroque
- Years built: 1770–1775
- Closed: 1903
- Demolished: 1913

Administration
- Diocese: Salzburg

The Nikolauskirche was a Catholic parish church in Oberndorf bei Salzburg, Austria, dedicated to Saint Nicholas, the patron saint of boatmen. The Christmas carol "Stille Nacht" ("Silent Night") was first performed in the church in 1818.

A first church in the area, at Altach, was mentioned in the 12th century. It was known as the Schifferkirche St. Nikola or simply St. Nikola. After it burned down in 1757, it was rebuilt in Baroque style and became the parish church of Oberndorf. After repeated flooding by the Salzach, it was demolished in 1910 and replaced by a new church when the whole settlement was relocated higher above the river.

== History ==
=== First church, 12th century ===
A first church in the area from the 12th century was dedicated to Saint Nicholas, the patron saint of boatmen, in Altach, the oldest part of the present Oberndorf, a place for trading salt and other goods transported by boats on the Salzach. The church, affiliated to the parish of Stiftskirche Laufen, was managed by the boatmen. It was known as the Schifferkirche St. Nikola or simply St. Nikola. The building was damaged by flooding in the 1650s, requiring a restoration which was begun in 1661.

=== Rebuilt church ===
On 1 April 1757 Altach was severely hit by fire, including the church, with only the tower remaining. It was rebuilt from 1770 to 1775, with a new hall in Baroque style and a house that also served as a residence for the custodian and a school. The church was consecrated on 28 October 1798 by Sigmund Christoph Zeil-Trauchburg, then the prince-bishop of the Diocese of Chiemsee. The restoration was financed by income from the trading boats. The building, which was used as a boatmen's church until 1816. It was later used as a pastoral centre and from 1850 as the Oberndorf parish church.

=== Parish church ===
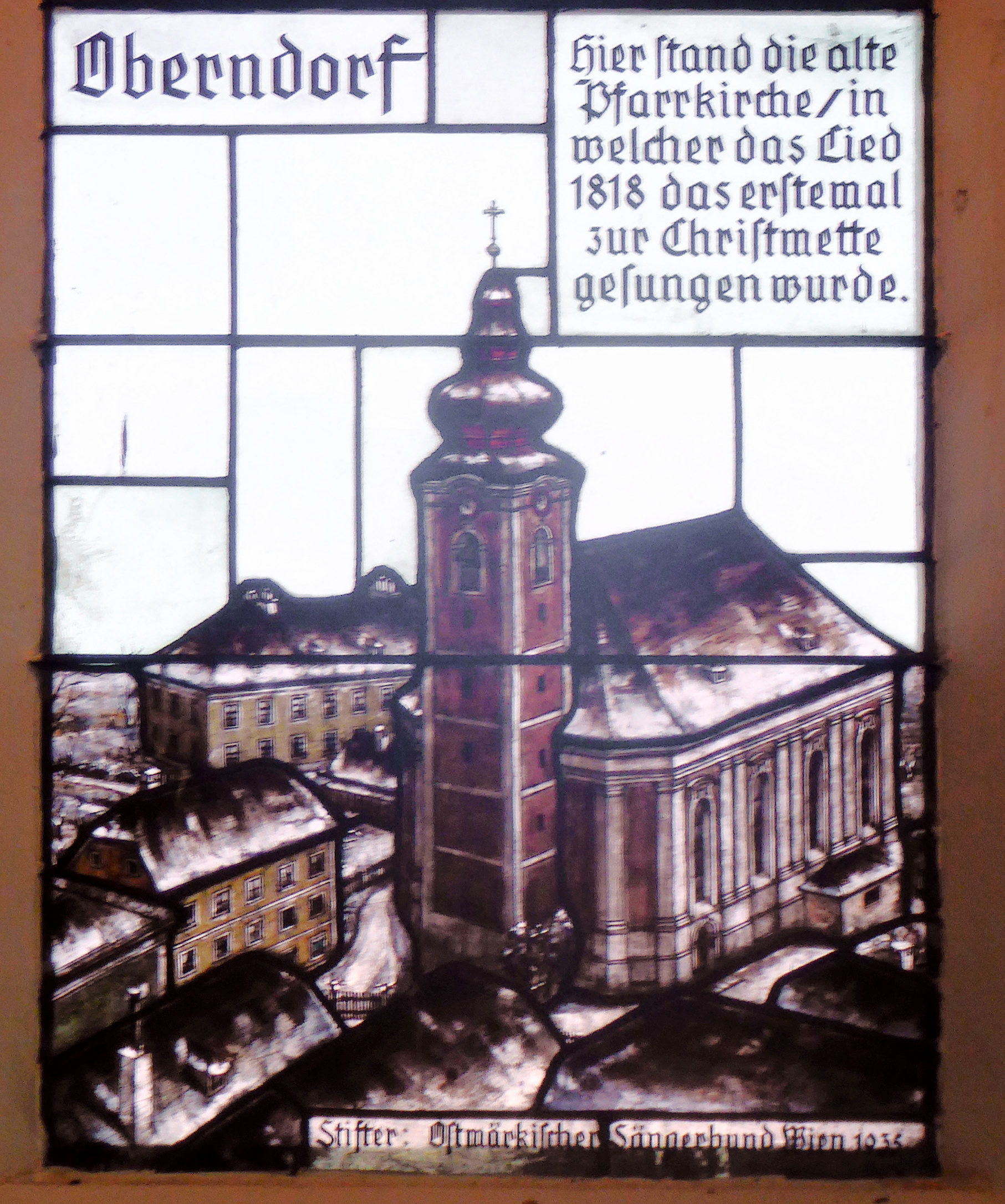
The Nikolauskirche on a stained-glass window of the Silent Night Chapel

From 1816 when the border between the Austrian Empire and Bavaria was changed, the Nikolauskirche became the parish church of the Austrian Oberndorf. The Christmas carol "Stille Nacht" ("Silent Night") was first performed in the church in 1818.

The first parish priest was Johann Nepomuk Waibl in 1850. The church had to be closed due to flooding in 1852, while the foundation was strengthened by metal. In 1894 the organ balcony was transformed to seating for the congregation, and the organ moved to a new upper organ loft.

Floodings in 1897 and especially 1899 damaged the church severely, and it was closed on 23 November 1903. It was decided to relocate the complete settlement to a different location higher above the river. From 1906 to 1910, a new church was built.

=== Demolition ===
The demolition of the Nikolauskirche was decided in 1906. The commission for monuments (Zentralkommission für Denkmalpflege) tried to preserve at least the tower dating back to the first church, but it was rejected due to the costs, as was the concept to preserve at least a chapel. Demolition was completed in 1913. Ultimately, a new memorial chapel, the Silent Night Chapel, was built. It began in 1924 on top of the rubble of the former church and only completed in 1936 due to the economic restrictions after World War I; it was consecrated in 1937.
