= Silent Night, Holy Night (film) =

1975 Australian-American TV series or program

- Written by: Gene Thompson
- Voices of: Kevin Golsby; Richard Meikle; James Condon; Barbara Frawley
- Music by: Pat Aulton; Hoyt Curtin; Joseph Barbera; William Hanna
- Countries of origin: Australia; United States
- Original language: English

Production
- Executive producer: Milton Salzburg
- Producers: William Hanna; Joseph Barbera
- Editors: Peter Addison; Peter Jennings
- Running time: 30 minutes
- Production companies: Hanna-Barbera Productions; Hanna-Barbera Australia

Original release
- Network: Syndication
- Release: December 1975 in American syndication

Silent Night, Holy Night is a 1975 animated television special produced by Hanna-Barbera and written by Gene Thompson. The special aired for the first time in several major markets in December 1975, including Boston (WSBK-38) and Philadelphia (WKBS-48).

== Plot ==
During a choir practice two days before Christmas, village organist Franz Gruber is worried to hear unusual sounds from the church organ and suspects the bellows. One of Gruber's sons discovers mice in the pipes of the organ and the mice have chewed up parts of the organ. Without it, the church choir cannot perform the rehearsed Bach piece because the music was written to be performed with an organ.

Accompanied by both his sons, Gruber travels to Salzburg, hoping to buy spare parts and then mend the organ when returning to the village. The party is caught in a snow storm and the spare part is lost on the way home, but pastor Joseph Mohr is simply thankful they are unharmed.

Pastor Mohr (with a little help from the bell-ringer Otto) writes the lyrics for a song and the next morning he brings it to Gruber, asking him to compose a melody for the lyrics. With some inspiration from his wife, Gruber sets music to Mohr's words. At church, Gruber and Mohr present "Silent Night" performed a cappella by the choir.

== Cast ==
- Kevin Golsby
- Richard Meikle
- James Condon
- Brett Way
- Barbara Frawley
- Boris Janjic Jr.
- John Meillon Jr.

== Soundtrack ==
"Silent Night" with music by Franz Xaver Gruber to lyrics by Joseph Mohr.
