= Franz Xaver Gruber =

Austrian composer (1787–1863)

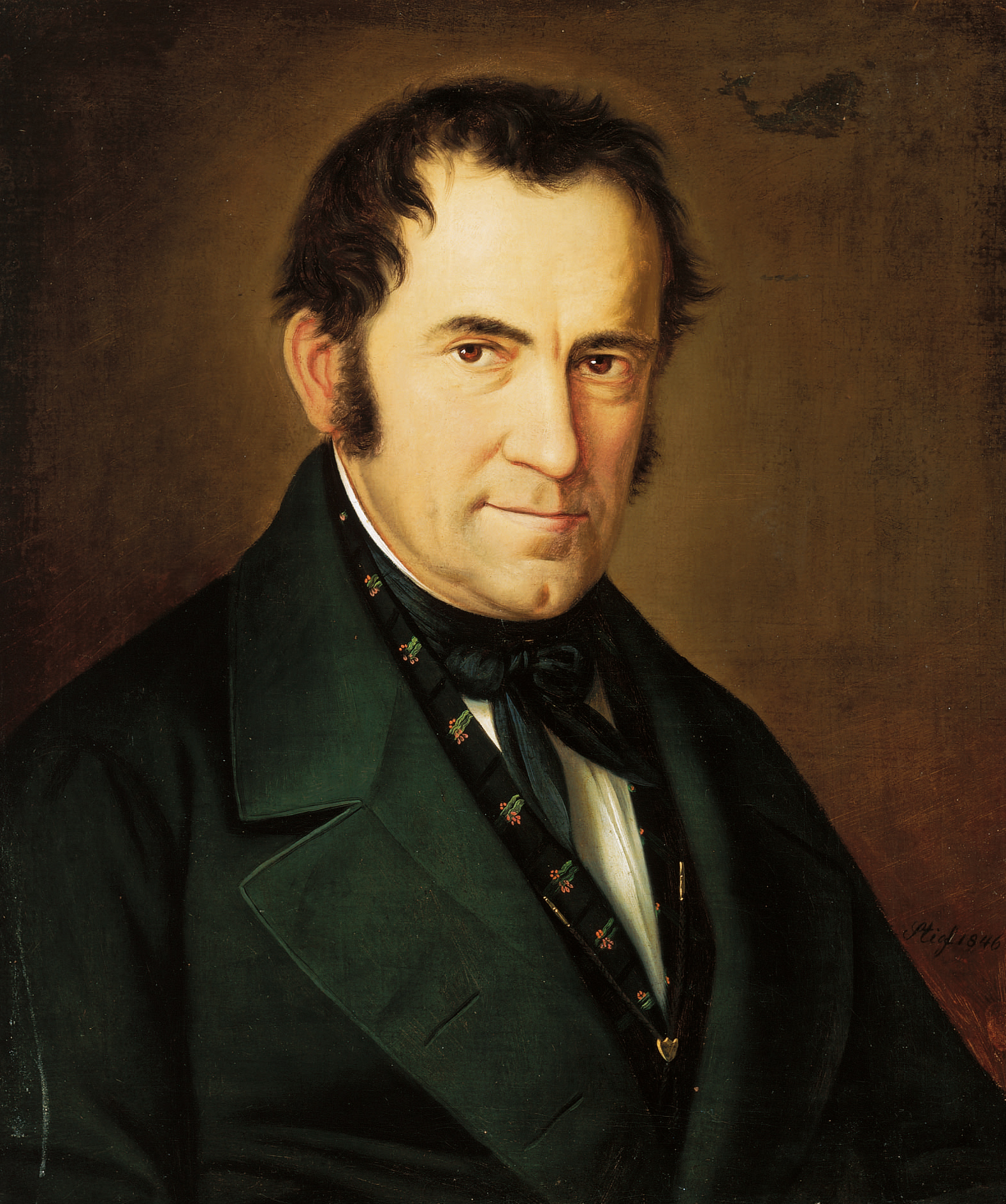
- Portrait by Sebastian Stief (Hallein,1846), Silent Night Museum, Hallein
- Born: 25 November 1787; Hochburg-Ach, Upper Austria, Archduchy of Austria, Holy Roman Empire
- Died: 7 June 1863 (aged 75); Hallein, Duchy of Salzburg, Austrian Empire
- Occupations: Teacher; church organist; composer
- Works: Stille Nacht (Silent Night)

Franz Xaver Gruber (25 November 1787 – 7 June 1863) was an Austrian primary school teacher, church organist and composer in the village of Arnsdorf, who is best known for composing the music to "Stille Nacht" ("Silent Night").

== Life ==
Gruber was born on 25 November 1787 in the village of Hochburg-Ach, Upper Austria, the son of linen weavers, Josef and Maria Gruber. His given name was recorded in the baptismal record as "Conrad Xavier," but this was later changed to "Franz Xaver". The Hochburger schoolteacher Andreas Peterlechner gave him music lessons.

Gruber worked as a weaver until the age of 18, then trained to become a schoolteacher. He completed his music education studying with the church organist of Burghausen, Georg Hartdobler. In 1807, Gruber became a schoolteacher in Arnsdorf. He also became the church caretaker and organist.

In 1808, he married a widow, Maria Elisabeth Fischinger Engelsberger. They had two children, both of whom died young. After the death of his first wife in 1825, Gruber married a former student, Maria Breitfuss. They had ten children, four of whom survived to adulthood.

In 1829, Gruber moved to Berndorf, and in later years to Hallein, Salzburg, where he was named choir director, singer and organist.

Maria Gruber died in childbirth in 1841. The following year he married Katherine Wimmer.

== "Silent Night" ==
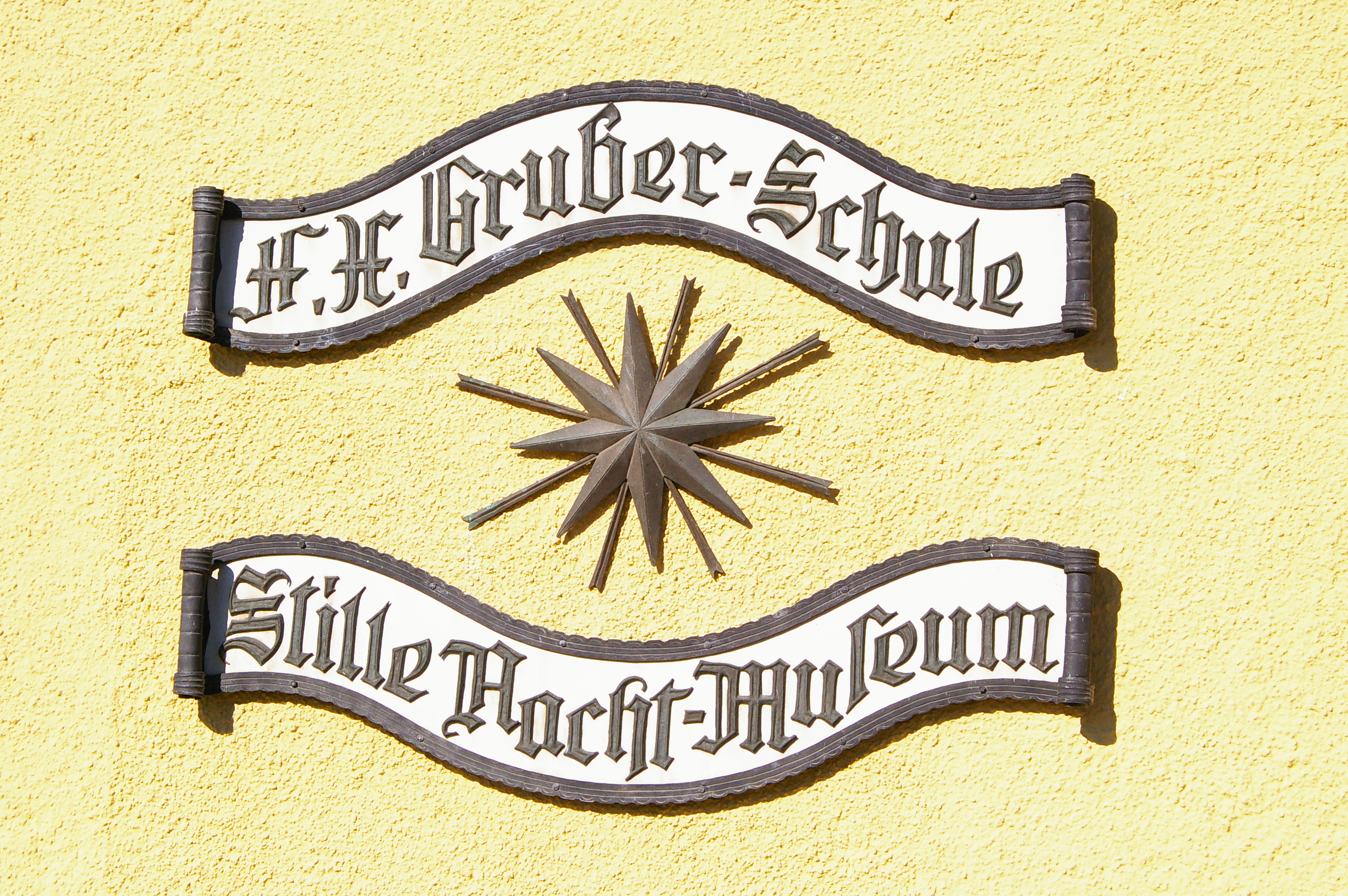
Gruber taught at the primary school in Arnsdorf

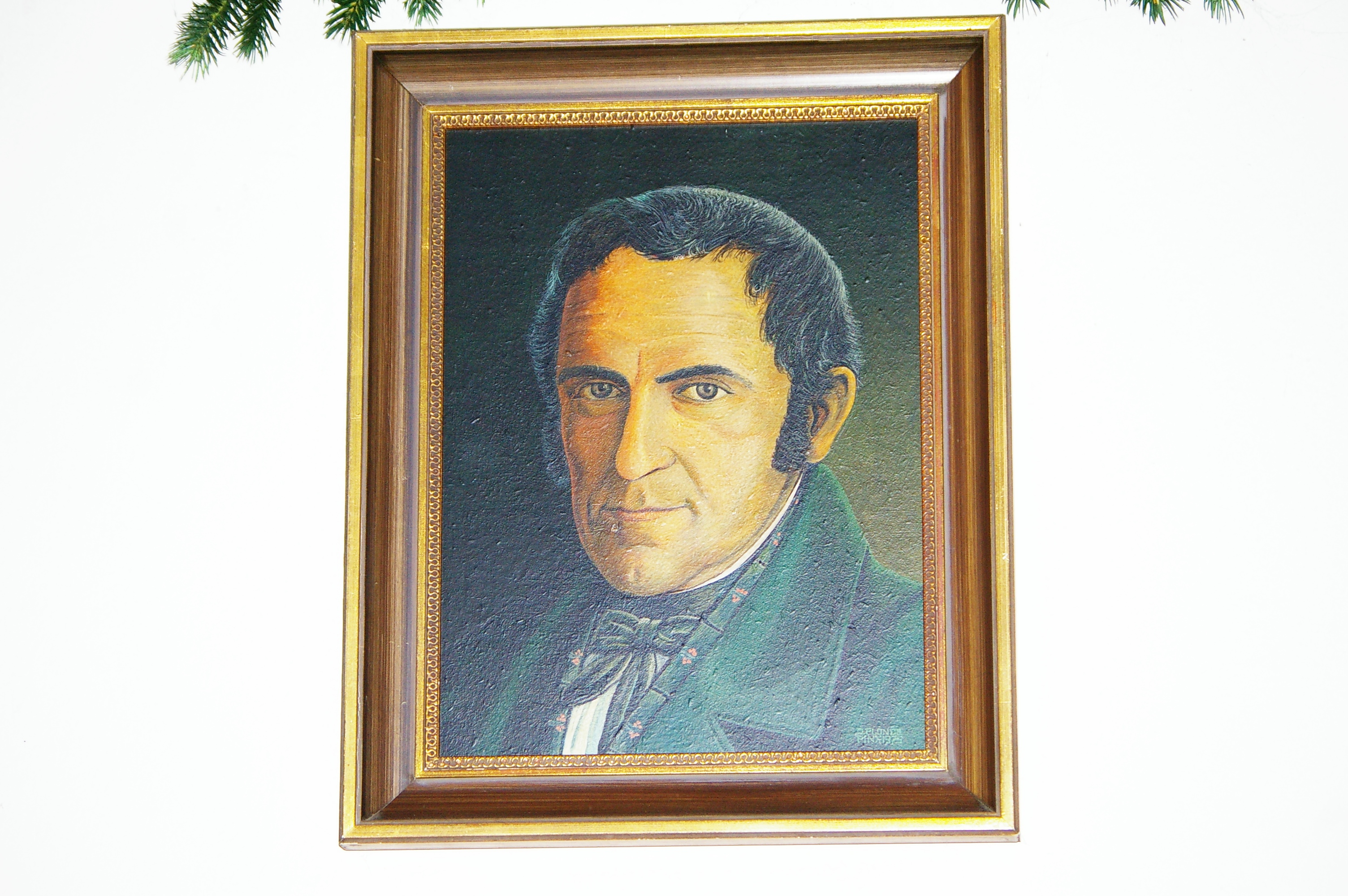
Portrait in the Silent Night Chapel in Oberndorf bei Salzburg

Silent Night
Choral version by United States Army Chorus

In 1816 he took on the additional responsibilities of organist and choirmaster at the Nikolauskirche in the neighboring village of Oberndorf.

Together with Joseph Mohr, a Catholic priest who wrote the original German lyrics, Gruber composed the music for the Christmas carol Silent Night. On Christmas Eve of 1818, Mohr, an assistant priest at the Nikolauskirche, showed Gruber a six-stanza poem he had written in 1816. He asked Gruber to set the poem to music. The organ was in fine condition but a yearly tradition of sharing a new carol continued. The two men sang Stille Nacht for the first time at Christmas Mass in St Nicholas Church while Mohr played guitar and the choir repeated the last two lines of each verse. For a long time, many thought that Silent Night was written by Haydn, Mozart or Schubert.

In later years, Gruber composed additional arrangements of the carol for organ and for organ with orchestra, as well as scores of other carols and masses, many of which are still in print and sung today in Austrian churches.

== Family ==
Gruber was the son of Joseph Gruber (1761–1821) and Anna Gruber (1766–1825). He was married three times: first to Elizabeth Tischinger (1781–1825), then to Maria Breitfuss (1806–1841) and finally to Katharina Wimmer (1842–1873). He had two sons with his second wife: Felix (1823–1868) and Franz (1827–1917).

== See also ==
- List of Austrians in music
