= List of Cirsium species =

The following species in the flowering plant genus Cirsium, the plume thistles, are accepted by Plants of the World Online. A 2022 molecular study reassigned many species to other genera, but Cirsium remains a speciose genus. Already as a result of the genetic study Ackerfield et al. 2020, Cirsium and Carduus were determined to be polyphyletic in their current circumscriptions, suggesting to either "consolidate all taxa into one large genus (Carduus or Cirsium)," or "recognize each major clade as a genus (Carduus, Cirsium, Eriolepis, Notobasis, Picnomon, Silybum, and Tyrimnus)". Bureš et al. 2023 examined ploidy, genome length, morphological similarity and other lines of evidence, reaching a similar conclusion; whereas the former study referred to a broader range of genera by the term "Carduus–Cirsium group", the latter was published on the heels of the separation of Lophiolepis and Epitrachys from Cirsium, so the focused shifted to their surprising result of Carduus and Tirymnus being nested within Cirsium. Since further genetic evidence is needed to resolve the intergeneric relationships of the Carduinae, this list will be restricted to species in the current genus Cirsium.

== North American section ==
- Cirsium acantholepis Petr.
- Cirsium acrolepis (Petr.) G.B.Ownbey
- Cirsium altissimum (L.) Spreng.
- Cirsium anartiolepis Petr.
- Cirsium andersonii Petr.
- Cirsium andrewsii Jeps.
- Cirsium arctorhaphis G.L.Nesom
- Cirsium arizonicum (A.Gray) Petr.
- Cirsium barnebyi S.L.Welsh & Neese
- Cirsium bicentenariale Rzed.
- Cirsium bocoynense G.L.Nesom
- Cirsium brevifolium Nutt.
- Cirsium brevistylum Cronquist
- Cirsium calcareum (M.E.Jones) Wooton & Standl.
- Cirsium canescens Nutt.
- Cirsium carolinianum (Walter) Fernald & B.G.Schub.
- Cirsium ciliolatum (L.F.Hend.) J.T.Howell
- Cirsium clavatum (M.E.Jones) Petr.
- Cirsium coahuilense Ownbey & Pinkava
- Cirsium conspicuum Sch.Bip.
- Cirsium crassicaule Jeps.
- Cirsium cymosum (Greene) J.T.Howell
- Cirsium discolor (Muhl. ex Willd.) Spreng.
- Cirsium douglasii DC.
- Cirsium drummondii Torr. & A.Gray
- Cirsium eatonii B.L.Rob.
- Cirsium edule Nutt.
- Cirsium ehrenbergii Sch.Bip.
- Cirsium engelmannii Rydb.
- Cirsium flodmanii Arthur
- Cirsium foliosum DC.
- Cirsium fontinale Jeps.
- Cirsium grahamii A.Gray
- Cirsium helenioides (L.) Hill
- Cirsium hookerianum Nutt.
- Cirsium horridulum Michx.
- Cirsium hydrophilum Jeps.
- Cirsium inamoenum (Greene) D.J.Keil
- Cirsium joannae S.L.Welsh, N.D.Atwood & L.C.Higgins
- Cirsium jorullense Spreng.
- Cirsium lappoides Sch.Bip.
- Cirsium lecontei Torr. & A.Gray
- Cirsium longistylum R.J.Moore & Frankton
- Cirsium mexicanum DC.
- Cirsium mohavense (Greene) Petr.
- Cirsium muticum Michx.
- Cirsium nuttallii DC.
- Cirsium neomexicanum A.Gray
- Cirsium ochrocentrum A.Gray
- Cirsium parryi Petr.
- Cirsium occidentale (Nutt.) Jeps.
- Cirsium ownbeyi S.L.Welsh
- Cirsium perplexans Petr.
- Cirsium pitcheri Torr. & A.Gray
- Cirsium praeteriens J.F.Macbr.
- Cirsium pringlei Petr.
- Cirsium pulcherrimum (Rydb.) K.Schum.
- Cirsium pumilum Spreng.
- Cirsium quercetorum (A.Gray) Jeps.
- Cirsium remotifolium DC.
- Cirsium repandum Michx.
- Cirsium rhaphilepis Petr.
- Cirsium rhothophilum S.F.Blake
- Cirsium rydbergii Petr.
- Cirsium scariosum Nutt.
- Cirsium subcoriaceum (Less.) Sch.Bip.
- Cirsium texanum Buckley
- Cirsium tracyi Petr.
- Cirsium turneri Warnock
- Cirsium undulatum Spreng.
- Cirsium velatum (S.Watson) Petr.
- Cirsium vinaceum Wooton & Standl.
- Cirsium virginianum Michx.
- Cirsium wheeleri Petr.
- Cirsium wrightii A.Gray

== Section Cephalonoplos (Neck.) DC. ==
- Cirsium arvense (L.) Scop.

== Section Cirsium ==
=== Subsection Acaulia Petrak ===
- Cirsium acaule (L.) Scop.
- Cirsium brevipapposum Tschern.
- Cirsium esculentum (Siev.) C.A.Mey.
- Cirsium rhizocephalum C.A.Mey.

=== Subsection Cirsium ===
==== Series Cirsium × Lophiolepis Bureš ====
- ×Cirsium vulgare (Savi) Ten. (pro sp.)

==== Series Creticum ====
- Cirsium creticum (Lam.) d'Urv.
- Cirsium tymphaeum Hausskn.

==== Series Heterophylla Kharadze ====
- Cirsium dealbatum M.Bieb.
- Cirsium erisithales Scop.
- Cirsium heterophyllum (L.) Hill

==== Series sine nomine ====
- Cirsium × erucagineum (Lam.) DC.
- Cirsium × hybridum W.D.J.Koch ex DC.
- Cirsium monspessulanum (L.) Hill.
- Cirsium oleraceum (L.) Scop.
- Cirsium palustre (L.) Scop.
- Cirsium rivulare (Jacq.) All.
- Cirsium × subalpinum Gaudin

=== Subsection Echenais (Cass.) Petrak (pro sect.) ===
- Cirsium alberti Regel & Schmalh.
- Cirsium badakhschanicum Kharadze
- Cirsium echinus (M.Bieb.) Hand.-Mazz.
- Cirsium × glabrifolium (C.Winkl.) Petr.
- Cirsium × kozlovskyi Petr.
- Cirsium obvallatum M.Bieb.
- Cirsium sairamense O.Fedtsch. & B.Fedtsch.
- Cirsium semenowii Regel
- Cirsium sieversii (Fisch. & C.A.Mey.) Petr.
- Cirsium simplex C.A.Mey.

=== Subsection Orthocentrum (Cass.) Kharadze ===
==== Series Cana Kharadze ====
- Cirsium canum (L.) All.
- Cirsium hypoleucum DC.
- Cirsium pannonicum (L.f.) Link

==== incertae sedis ====
- Cirsium alatum (S.G.Gmel.) Bobrov
- Cirsium albowianum Sommier & Levier
- Cirsium × aschersonii Čelak.
- Cirsium elbrusense Sommier & Levier
- Cirsium elodes M.Bieb.
- Cirsium greimleri Bureš
- Cirsium hygrophilum Boiss.
- Cirsium libanoticum DC.
- Cirsium × linkianum M.Loehr
- Cirsium oblongifolium K.Koch
- Cirsium pseudopersonata Boiss. & Balansa
- Cirsium pubigerum (Desf.) DC.
- Cirsium × reichardtii Juratzka
- Cirsium rhabdotolepis Petr.
- Cirsium subinerme Fisch. & C.A.Mey.
- Cirsium svaneticum Sommier & Levier
- Cirsium sychnosanthum Petr.
- Cirsium uliginosum (M.Bieb.) Fisch.
- Cirsium waldsteinii Rouy
- Cirsium × suspiciosum Beck

=== Subsection Sinocirsium Kitam. ===
==== Series Japonica Kitam. ====
- Cirsium japonicum DC.
- Cirsium kamtschaticum Ledeb. ex DC.
- Cirsium maackii Maxim.
- Cirsium nipponicum Makino
- Cirsium pectinellum A.Gray

==== Series Schantarensia Kitam. ====
- Cirsium schantarense Trautv. & C.A.Mey.

=== Subsection Spanioptilon (Less.) Kitam. ===
==== Series Asiatica Kharadze ====
- Cirsium komarovii Schischk.
- Cirsium serratuloides (L.) Hill

==== Series Vlassoviana Kharadze ====
- Cirsium vlassovianum Fisch. ex DC.

=== incertae sedis ===
- Cirsium × affine Tausch
- Cirsium × ambiguum All.
- Cirsium × ausserdorferi Hausm. ex Treuinf.
- Cirsium × bifrons Arv.-Touv.
- Cirsium × bourgaeanum Willk.
- Cirsium × braun-blanquetianum Lawalrée
- Cirsium × candolleanum Nägeli
- Cirsium dissectum (L.) Hill
- Cirsium × dominii M.Schulze
- Cirsium filipendulum Lange
- Cirsium × forsteri (Sm.) Loudon
- Cirsium × kornhuberi Heimerl
- Cirsium × muellneri Beck
- Cirsium × murrianum Khek
- Cirsium × praealpinum Beck
- Cirsium × purpureum All.
- Cirsium × semidecurrens DC.
- Cirsium × siegertii Sch.Bip. ex Reichardt
- Cirsium × silesiacum Sch.Bip.
- Cirsium × sudae E.Michálk. & Bureš
- Cirsium tuberosum (L.) All.
- Cirsium × tataricum (L.) DC.
- Cirsium × vivantii L.Villar, Segarra, J.López, Pérez-Coll. & Catalán
- Cirsium × wankelii Reichardt
- Cirsium × wettsteinii Petr.
- Cirsium × wiedermannii Khek
- Cirsium × woronowii Petr.

== Section Pseudo-eriolepis (Nakai) Kitam. ==
- Cirsium pendulum Fisch. ex DC.

== incertae sedis ==
- Cirsium aidzuense Nakai ex Kitam.
- Cirsium akimontanum Kadota
- Cirsium akimotoi Kadota & Mas.Saito
- Cirsium × alpestre Nägeli
- Cirsium alpicola Nakai
- Cirsium alpis-lunae Brilli-Catt. & L.Gubellini
- Cirsium alsophilum (Pollini) Soldano
- Cirsium amplexifolium (Nakai) Kitam.
- Cirsium aomorense Nakai
- Cirsium apoense Nakai
- Cirsium appendiculatum Griseb.
- Cirsium argyracanthum DC.
- Cirsium arisanense Kitam.
- Cirsium ashinokuraense Kadota
- Cirsium ashiuense Shun.Yokoy. & T.Shimizu
- Cirsium austrohidakaense Kadota
- Cirsium ayasii H.Duman & Dirmenci
- Cirsium babanum Koidz.
- Cirsium bertolonii Spreng.
- Cirsium × bipontinum F.W.Schultz
- Cirsium bitchuense Nakai
- Cirsium boninense Koidz.
- Cirsium borealinipponense Kitam.
- Cirsium × boulayi E.G.Camus
- Cirsium brachycephalum Juratzka
- Cirsium bracteiferum C.Shih
- Cirsium × breunium Goller & Huter
- Cirsium brevicaule A.Gray
- Cirsium × breviscapum Eichenf.
- Cirsium buchwaldii O.Hoffm.
- Cirsium buergeri Miq.
- Cirsium candelabrum Griseb.
- Cirsium canoasense G.L.Nesom
- Cirsium carniolicum Scop.
- Cirsium × celakovskyanum K.Knaf
- Cirsium centaureae (Rydb.) K.Schum.
- Cirsium cernuum Lag.
- Cirsium charkeviczii Barkalov
- Cirsium × chatenieri Legrand ex H.J.Coste
- Cirsium chellyense R.J.Moore & Frankton
- Cirsium chikabumiense Kadota
- Cirsium chikushiense Koidz.
- Cirsium chilaishanense S.S.Ying
- Cirsium chinense Gardner & Champ.
- Cirsium chionanthum G.L.Nesom & García-Mor.
- Cirsium chokaiense Kitam.
- Cirsium chrysacanthum (Ball) Jahand.
- Cirsium cilicicum P.H.Davis & Parris
- Cirsium coloradense (Rydb.) Cockerell ex Daniels
- Cirsium confertissimum Nakai
- Cirsium congdonii R.J.Moore & Frankton
- Cirsium congestissimum Kitam.
- Cirsium × connexum Kitam.
- Cirsium consociatum S.F.Blake
- Cirsium × csepeliense Borbás
- Cirsium culebraense Ackerf.
- Cirsium dasyphyllum G.L.Nesom
- Cirsium dender Friis
- Cirsium dipsacolepis Matsum.
- Cirsium domonii Kadota
- Cirsium ducellieri Maire
- Cirsium durangense (Greenm.) G.B.Ownbey
- Cirsium dyris Jahand. & Maire
- Cirsium eliasianum Kit Tan & Sorger
- Cirsium englerianum O.Hoffm.
- Cirsium eorythros G.L.Nesom
- Cirsium epiroticum Petr.
- Cirsium eriophoroides (Hook.f.) Petr.
- Cirsium × erisithaliforme Preissm.
- Cirsium excelsius Petr.
- Cirsium × fabium Porta ex Kern.
- Cirsium falconeri (Hook.f.) Petr.
- Cirsium fanjingshanense C.Shih
- Cirsium fargesii (Franch.) Diels
- Cirsium faucium Petr.
- Cirsium fauriei Nakai
- Cirsium ferum Kitam.
- Cirsium flavisquamatum Kitam.
- Cirsium forrestii (Diels) H.Lév.
- Cirsium × freyerianum W.D.J.Koch
- Cirsium funagataense Kadota
- Cirsium funkiae Ackerf.
- Cirsium furusei Kitam.
- Cirsium fuscotrichum C.C.Chang
- Cirsium gaditanum Talavera & Valdés
- Cirsium ganjuense Kitam.
- Cirsium glaberrimum (Petr.) Petr.
- Cirsium glabrum DC.
- Cirsium × grandiflorum Kitt.
- Cirsium grandirosuliferum Kadota
- Cirsium gratiosum Kitam.
- Cirsium grayanum Nakai
- Cirsium griffithii Boiss.
- Cirsium griseum (Rydb.) K.Schum.
- Cirsium × grossheimii Petr.
- Cirsium gyojanum Kitam.
- Cirsium hachijoense Nakai
- Cirsium hachimantaiense Kadota
- Cirsium hagurosanense Kadota
- Cirsium handelii Petr.
- Cirsium happoense Kadota
- Cirsium harrisonii (S.L.Welsh) Ackerf. & D.J.Keil
- Cirsium hasunumae Kadota
- Cirsium × heerianum Nägeli
- Cirsium heiianum Koidz.
- Cirsium henryi (Franch.) Diels
- Cirsium hesperium (Eastw.) Rydb.
- Cirsium heterotrichum Pančić
- Cirsium × heuseri Uechtr.
- Cirsium hida-paludosum Kadota & Nagase
- Cirsium hidakamontanum Kadota
- Cirsium homolepis Nakai
- Cirsium horiianum Kadota
- Cirsium hupingshanicum Z.C.Jin & Y.S.Chen
- Cirsium hygropodum G.L.Nesom
- Cirsium × iburiense Kitam.
- Cirsium imbricatum Petr.
- Cirsium inundatum Makino
- Cirsium ishizuchiense (Kitam.) Kadota
- Cirsium × ispolatovii Iljin ex Tzvelev
- Cirsium ito-kojianum Kadota
- Cirsium jaliscoense G.L.Nesom
- Cirsium × juratzkae Reichardt ex Heimerl
- Cirsium kagamontanum Nakai
- Cirsium kasaianum Kadota
- Cirsium katoanum Kadota
- Cirsium kenji-horieanum Kadota
- Cirsium kirishimense Kadota & Mas.Saito
- Cirsium × kirschlegeri Sch.Bip.
- Cirsium kisoense (T.Yamaz. & K.Asano) Kadota
- Cirsium kubikialpicola Kadota
- Cirsium kujuense Kadota
- Cirsium latifolium Lowe
- Cirsium leducii H.Lév.
- Cirsium leo Nakai & Kitag.
- Cirsium leucopsis DC.
- Cirsium lineare (Thunb.) Sch.Bip.
- Cirsium × lojkae Sommier & Levier
- Cirsium lomatolepis Petr.
- Cirsium longepedunculatum Kitam.
- Cirsium lucens Kitam.
- Cirsium luzoniense Merr.
- Cirsium magofukui Kitam.
- Cirsium mairei Halácsy
- Cirsium maritimum Makino
- Cirsium markaguntense (S.L.Welsh) Ackerf. & D.J.Keil
- Cirsium × martini L.C.Lamb.
- Cirsium maruyamanum Kitam.
- Cirsium masami-saitoanum Kadota
- Cirsium matsumurae Nakai
- Cirsium × mazanderanicum Petr.
- Cirsium × meratii P.Fourn.
- Cirsium michiliense G.L.Nesom
- Cirsium microspicatum Nakai
- Cirsium mimbresense G.L.Nesom
- Cirsium × mirabile Kitam.
- Cirsium × misawaense Nakai ex Kitam.
- Cirsium mollissimum G.L.Nesom
- Cirsium monocephalum H.Lév.
- Cirsium × moravicum Petr.
- Cirsium muliense C.Shih
- Cirsium muramatsui Kadota
- Cirsium myokoense Kadota
- Cirsium nagatoense Kadota
- Cirsium nagisoense Kadota
- Cirsium nambuense Nakai
- Cirsium nanhutashanense S.S.Ying
- Cirsium nasuense Kadota
- Cirsium × nevadense Willk.
- Cirsium nigriceps Standl. & Steyerm.
- Cirsium nippoense Kadota
- Cirsium nivale (Kunth) F.Dietr.
- Cirsium norikurense Nakai
- Cirsium × norrisii C.Bicknell
- Cirsium notorhaphis G.L.Nesom
- Cirsium novoleonense G.L.Nesom & García-Mor.
- Cirsium occidentalinipponense Kadota
- Cirsium × ochroleucum All.
- Cirsium ohminense Kadota
- Cirsium × okamotoi Kitam.
- Cirsium oligophyllum Matsum.
- Cirsium opacum (Kitam.) Kadota
- Cirsium orizabense Klatt
- Cirsium otayae Kitam.
- Cirsium pablillo G.L.Nesom
- Cirsium pascuarense (Kunth) Spreng.
- Cirsium × patens Kitam.
- Cirsium peckii L.F.Hend.
- Cirsium periacanthaceum C.Shih
- Cirsium × perplexissimum Kitam.
- Cirsium phulchokiense Kitam.
- Cirsium × pilosum Kitam.
- Cirsium pinetorum Greenm.
- Cirsium pitouchaoense S.S.Ying
- Cirsium × prativagum Petr.
- Cirsium × przybylzkii Eichenfeld
- Cirsium pseudocreticum (P.H.Davis & Parris) Yıldız, Dirmenci & Arabacı
- Cirsium pseudosuffultum Kadota
- Cirsium × pskemense Lazkov
- Cirsium pulchellum Wooton & Standl.
- Cirsium purpuratum Matsum.
- Cirsium pyrenaicum (Jacq.) All.
- Cirsium racemiforme Y.Ling & C.Shih
- Cirsium radians Benth.
- Cirsium rassulovii B.A.Sharipova
- Cirsium reglense Sch.Bip. ex Klatt
- Cirsium × reichenbachianum M.Loehr
- Cirsium rengehydrophilum Kadota
- Cirsium rhinoceros Nakai
- Cirsium × rigens Wallr.
- Cirsium roseolum Gorl.
- Cirsium rosulatum Talavera & Valdés
- Cirsium rupinarum G.L.Nesom
- Cirsium × sabaudum M.Loehr
- Cirsium scapanolepis Petr.
- Cirsium schimperi (Vatke) C.Jeffrey
- Cirsium × scopolii E. Khek. ex Leuter et Zeitler
- Cirsium scopulorum (Greene) Cockerell
- Cirsium senjoense Kitam.
- Cirsium × sennenii Rouy
- Cirsium setidens (Dunn) Nakai
- Cirsium shansiense Petr.
- Cirsium shidokimontanum Kadota
- Cirsium shihianum Greuter
- Cirsium shimae Kadota
- Cirsium shinanense Shimizu
- Cirsium sichuanense Z.C.Jin & Y.S.Chen
- Cirsium sidi-guinii Pau & Font Quer
- Cirsium sieboldii Miq.
- Cirsium skutchii S.F.Blake
- Cirsium × soroksarense Wagner
- Cirsium souliei (Franch.) Mattf. ex Rehder & Kobuski
- Cirsium spicatum Matsum.
- Cirsium spinosissimum (L.) Scop.
- Cirsium spinosum Kitam.
- Cirsium spinuliferum (Kitam.) Kadota
- Cirsium × stiriacum Fritsch
- Cirsium stojanovii Kuzmanov
- Cirsium straminispinum C.Jeffrey
- Cirsium × stroblii Hayek
- Cirsium × subspinuligerum Peterm.
- Cirsium subuliforme G.B.Ownbey
- Cirsium suffultum Matsum.
- Cirsium × sugimotoi Kitam.
- Cirsium suzukaense Kitam.
- Cirsium suzukii Kitam.
- Cirsium swaticum Petr.
- Cirsium taiwanense Y.H.Tseng & Chih Y.Chang
- Cirsium takahashii Kadota
- Cirsium taliense (Jeffrey) H.Lév.
- Cirsium tamastoloniferum Kadota
- Cirsium tancitaroense G.L.Nesom
- Cirsium tanegashimense Kitam. ex Kadota
- Cirsium tashiroi Kitam.
- Cirsium tatakaense Y.H.Tseng, Y.H.Tseng, Chih Y.Chang & C.Y.Chang
- Cirsium tenue Kitam.
- Cirsium tenuipedunculatum Kadota
- Cirsium tenuisquamatum Kitam.
- Cirsium tepehuanense G.L.Nesom
- Cirsium teshioense Kadota
- Cirsium tianmushanicum C.Shih
- Cirsium tioganum (Congdon) Petr.
- Cirsium togaense Kadota
- Cirsium tolucanum Petr.
- Cirsium townsendii (Petr.) G.L.Nesom
- Cirsium toyoshimae Koidz.
- Cirsium trachylomum S.F.Blake
- Cirsium uetsuense Kitam.
- Cirsium ugoense Nakai
- Cirsium umezawanum Kadota
- Cirsium unzenense Kadota & Mas.Saito
- Cirsium uzenense Kadota
- Cirsium valdespinulosum (Sennen) Sennen
- Cirsium valentinum Porta
- Cirsium vergelense G.L.Nesom
- Cirsium vernonioides C.Shih
- Cirsium verum Kadota
- Cirsium viperinum (D.J.Keil) Ackerf. & D.J.Keil
- Cirsium viridifolium (Hand.-Mazz.) C.Shih
- Cirsium wakasugianum Kadota
- Cirsium wallichii DC.
- Cirsium welwitschii Coss.
- Cirsium × winklerianum Čelak.
- Cirsium × woodwardii (H.C.Watson) Nyman
- Cirsium yachiyotakashimae Kadota
- Cirsium yakusimense Masam.
- Cirsium yamauchii Kadota
- Cirsium yatsu-alpicola Kadota & Y.Amano
- Cirsium yezoalpinum H.Koidz. ex Kadota & S.Umezawa
- Cirsium yezoense (Maxim.) Makino
- Cirsium yoshidae Kadota
- Cirsium yuki-uenoanum Kadota
- Cirsium yuzawae Kadota
- Cirsium zamoranense Rzed.
- Cirsium zawoense Kadota
