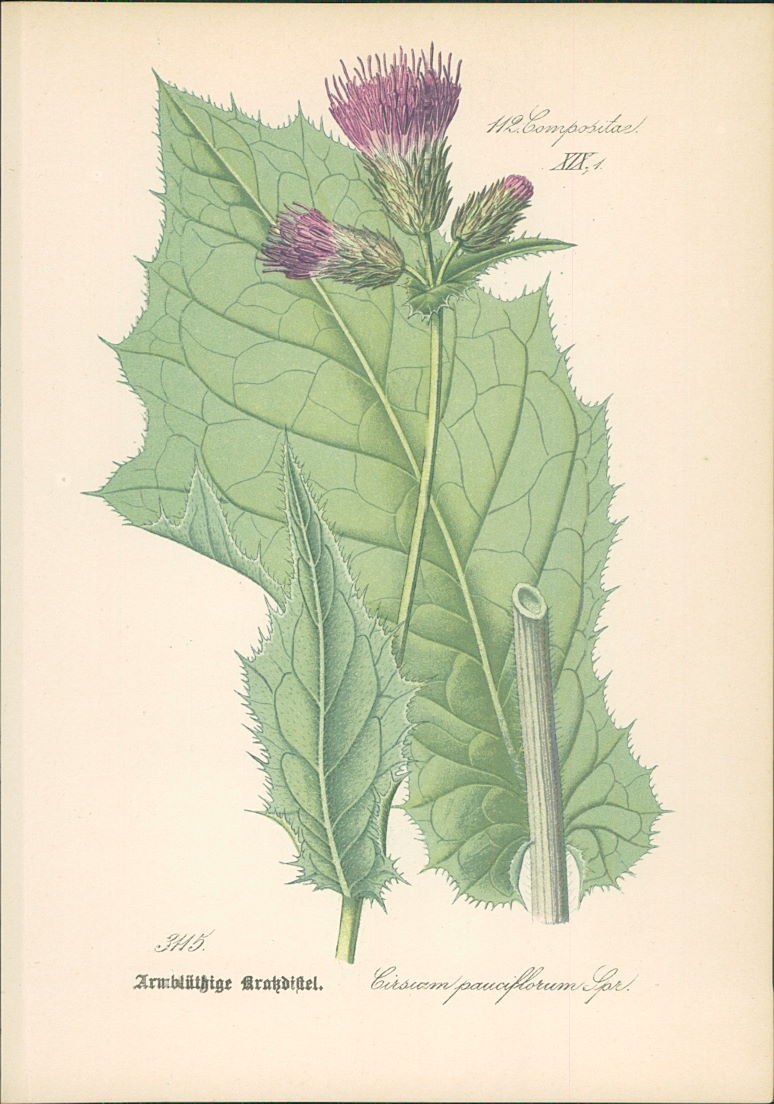
- 1895 illustration by Johann Gottfried Hallier

Scientific classification
- Kingdom: Plantae
- Clade: Tracheophytes
- Clade: Angiosperms
- Clade: Eudicots
- Clade: Asterids
- Order: Asterales
- Family: Asteraceae
- Genus: Cirsium
- Species: C. greimleri

Binomial name
- Cirsium greimleri Bureš
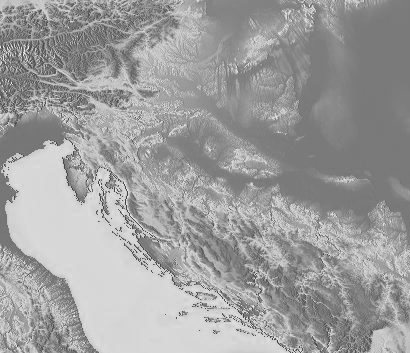
- Range of C. greimleri (precise locations only, missing only the unpublished new records from the 2024 paper)

= Cirsium greimleri =

Species of thistle

Cirsium greimleri, Greimler-Kratzdistel lit. 'Greimler's thistle', is a perennial species of flowering plant in the family Asteraceae. It was described as a separate species from Cirsium waldsteinii in 2018, from which it can be distinguished visually by its shallower lobes and deeper flower colour. Additionally, its leaves are unusually broad for the genus. It is one of a minority of species discovered through karyological analysis. It is a tall herbaceous plant with nodding purple flowers growing in high montane to subalpine habitats on exposed acidic slopes. It is native to Eastern Europe, but with an unusual geographic distribution. It is found only in the Eastern Alps and Dinaric Alps. It hybridises readily, to the extent that there is concern about genetic erosion for most populations.

== Description ==
=== Stems ===
Cirsium greimleri is a perennial species. Plants grow from oblique, cylindrical rhizomes to heights between 110 and 180 centimetres, (Note: minimum 70 cm, maximum 210 cm) with the exception of a rare form that only grows to 30 cm, and occasional sterile basal rosettes. Growth is erect but nodding below the capitula. Stems are shallowly ribbed. They are simple or have few branches. Their colour is green or reddish green but finely haired (pilose), or almost smooth (subglabrous) at the base, whitish green and sparsely webbed (arachnoid) in the middle, and white and densely arachnoid below the capitula.

=== Leaves ===
Leaves grow all along the stem. Ground level (basal) leaves are 11.5 to 23.3 cm (Note: minimum 8.2 cm, maximum 26.8 cm) wide and 1.2 to 2.1 cm (Note: minimum 1.0 cm, maximum 2.4 cm) longer than wide in mature specimens. Their morphology ranges from egg-shaped (ovate) to circular (orbicular) to triangular (deltate), especially in younger leaves. Stalk (peduncular) leaves are lobed (amplexicaul), often eared (auriculate). Their shallow feathered (pinnate) lobes are doubly toothed (serrate) to pinnatipartite, with weak yellowish to brownish-purple spinules up to 2 millimetres situated at the margins, subglabrous, to scattered hairy (pubescent), above and densely webbed-woolly (arachnoid-lanate) below. All leaves are soft and herbaceous.

==== Micromorphology ====
Stomatal guard cells are about 16.5 micrometres (Note: minimum12.3 μm, maximum 23.4 μm) long and 9.2 μm (Note: minimum 6.1 cm, maximum 18.4 cm) wide.

=== Flowers ===
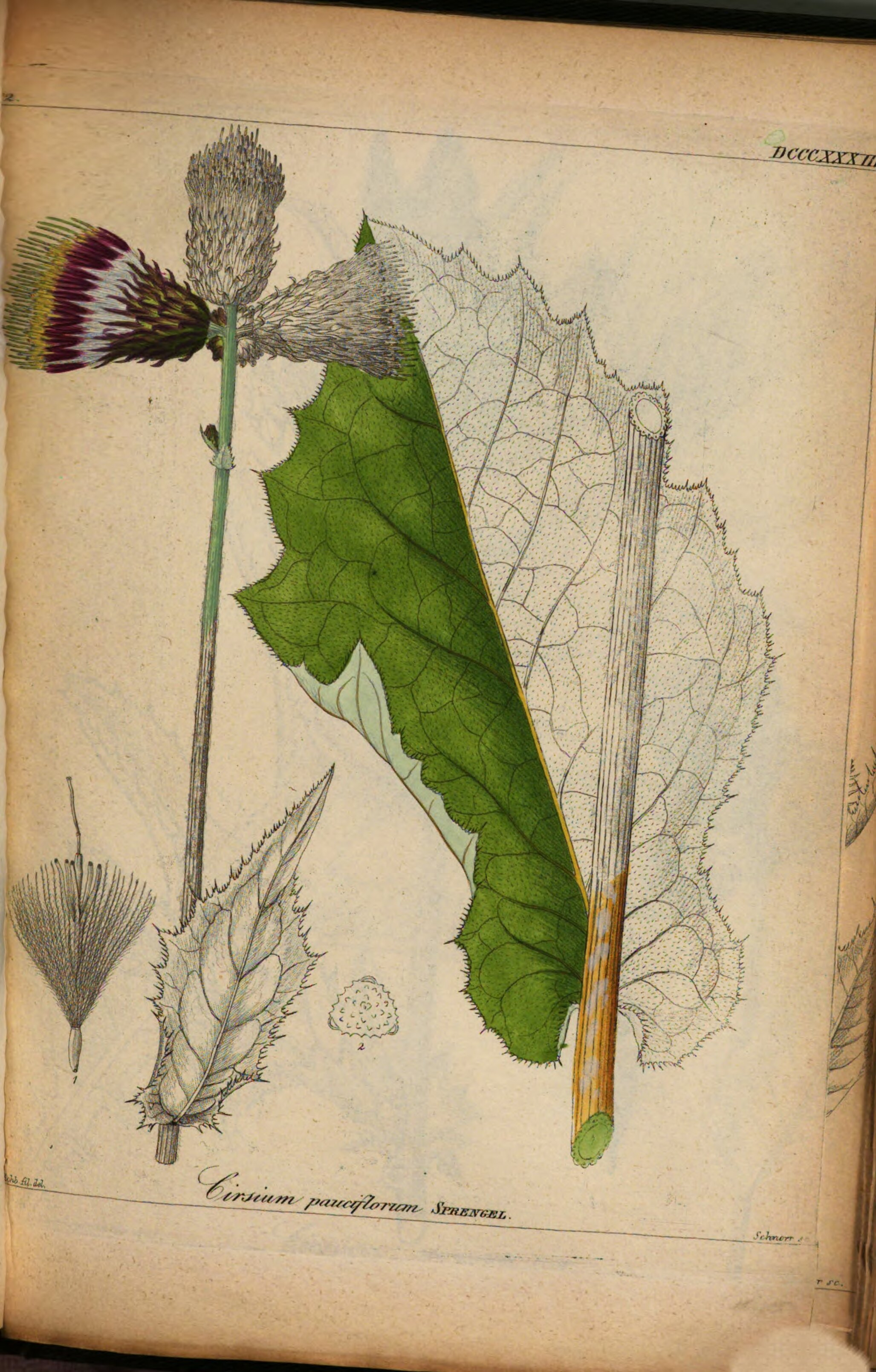
1853 illustration by Carl Schnorr

The flowers of C. greimleri are grouped in flower heads (capitula), with each head containing between 1 and 8 individual flowers. (Note: maximum 12) These flower heads can be solitary or arranged in clusters (corymbosely) at the top of the stem, sometimes appearing on 1 to 5 (Note: maximum 10) side branches (lateral pedicels). The protective casing around the flowers (the involucre) measures 12.9 to 21.0 mm (Note: 11.6 mm, maximum 21.7 mm) in length during flowering. Phyllaries are arranged in 6 to 7 rows. (Note: minimum 5, maximum 9) bracts flare out from the bud, with distinct vittae. The outer bracts having a visible spine, while the inner ones do not. Involucres are purplish brown to purplish black. (Note: Colour values are given in the Methuen system: greyish violet, deep violet, dark violet, dark purple, dark magenta, purplish black, purplish brown, dark ruby, brownish purple, deep crimson, ruby, greyish ochre, ochre.) The flower heads abound with nectar. The pollen is coarsely spined.

Petals are is 17.3 to 21.0 mm (Note: minimum 14.8 mm, maximum 23.0 mm) long in hermaphrodites, and 15.1 to 18 mm (Note: minimum 13.9 mm, maximum 19.2 mm) in females. At full flowering (anthesis), corollae average deep violet, but can be greyish violet or even ruby. During fading, corollae average dark purple, but can be lighter, dark magenta, or even dark ruby or dark violet. They ultimately fade to whitish, as does the brownish-purple (in hermaphrodites) or ochre synantherium. The style is always whitish except for the ruby shortly bi-lobed stigma, which fades to deep crimson or brownish-purple.

=== Fruit ===
Strongly wind-dispersed (anemochorous), its fruits contain oblong, compressed, asymmetric greyish ochre achenes, 16 to 19 mm (Note: minimum 15.0 mm, maximum 20.0 mm) in hermaphrodites, 14.5 to 18.0 mm (Note: minimum 13.5 mm, maximum 18.5 mm) in females. They are attached to either 4 or 5 mm (Note: minimum 3, maximum 6) pappi. The pappus is whitish and feathery or strawlike. The average dry weight of 1000 seeds (Note: TKW (thousand-kernel weight)) is 0.4 g.

=== Chromosomes ===
C. greimleri is a diploid species with sporophytic chromosome number 2n=2x=34, without variation. Its somatic nuclear DNA size is about 1929 Mega base pairs. (Note: minimum 1827 Mbp, maximum 2125 Mbp)

=== Similar species ===
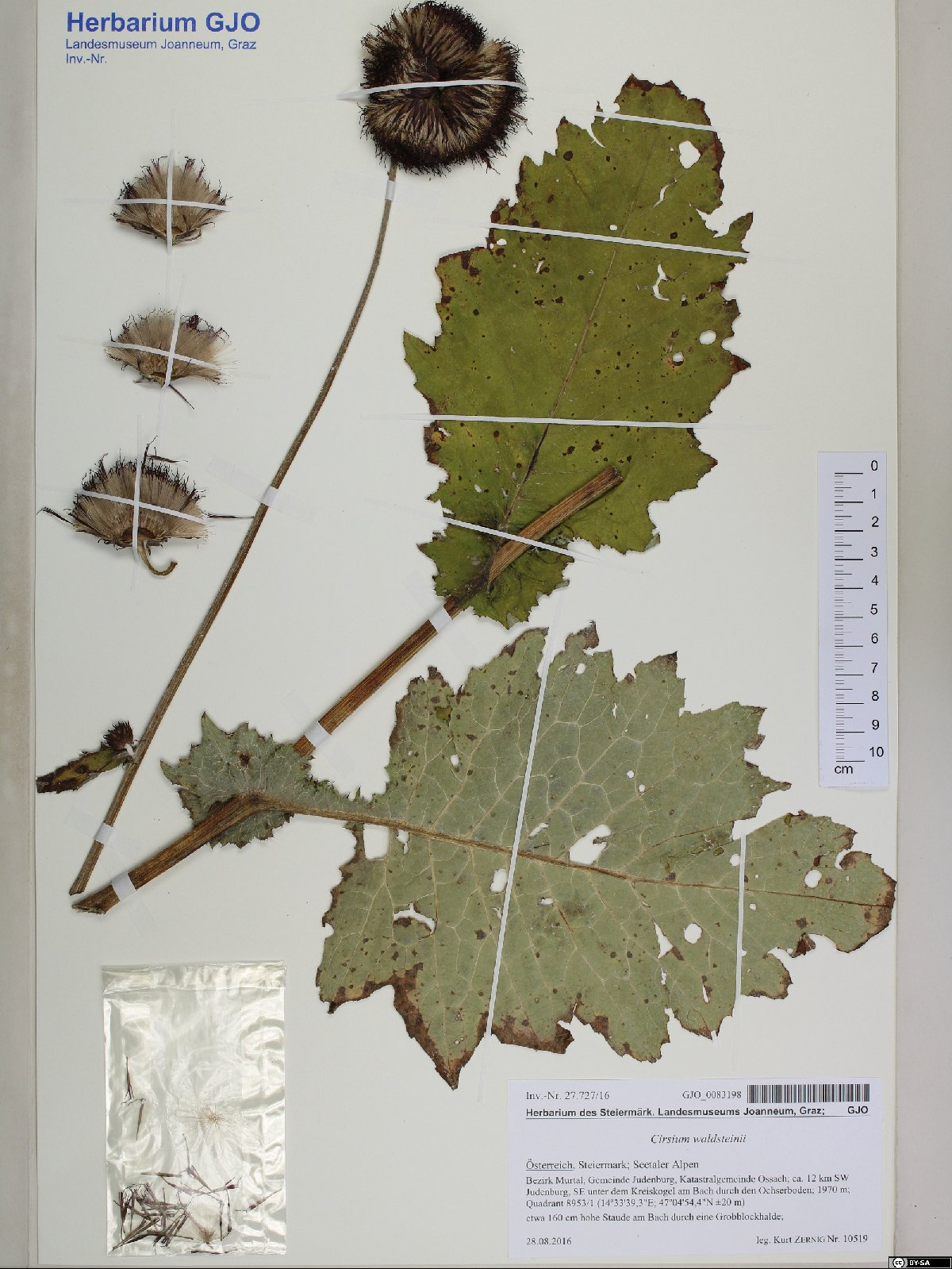
Representative specimen of C. greimleri

C. waldsteinii Rouy is genetically close and almost identical in appearance. In the field, the main distinguishing traits are lobe depth and flower colour. Although their basal leaves are roughly equal in width, the cauline leaves of C. waldsteinii are significantly wider, though the significantly deeper lobes of the latter may create the appearance of narrowness. The apparent broadness of C. greimleri leaves is distinctive within the genus. The corollae of C. waldsteinii are lighter in colour at any given stage, with little overlap in hue after opening (though both can be greyish violet at full bloom). Any comparison must be made between flowers of roughly equal stage. The green colour of its stems below the capitula are slightly visible, unlike the completely covered C. greimleri.

C. hypoleucum DC.. Its nodding flowers are sometimes ruby red like those of C. greimleri, which is rare for the genus. The leaves of C. hypoleucum, sometimes resembling C. waldsteinii more than C. greimleri, are white-tomentose beneath, in contrast to the greyish-arachnoid leaves of C. greimleri. The involucral bracts of C. greimleri gradually become longer inward. The involucres of C. hypoleucum differ markedly in colour from those of C. greimleri, and the involucres themselves are narrower. The idumentum of subcapitular stem is sparser.

C. carniolicum Scop.. Very similar to C. greimleri in vegetative stage, but with yellow to white flowers (Note: Pinkish in the Pyrenean subspecies C. carniolicum subsp. rufescens.) with tougher phyllaries and spiny sepals, visible green colour through the pilosity of the subcapitular stem, and more distinctive spines on upper cauline leaves with subglabrous undersides. C. alpis-lunae Brilli-Catt. & L.Gubellini is a C. carniolum like species with spiny phyllaries and longer, stiffer leaf spines but no overlap with C. greimleri.

A number of species of the Caucasus can be difficult to distinguish from the species: C. oblongifolium K.Koch (longer, oblong leaves, glabrous leaf undersides), C. pseudopersonata Boiss. & Balansa ex Boiss. (lighter flower colour, thinner subcapitular idumentum, glabrous leaf undersides), C. sychnosanthum Petr. (glabrous leaf undersides), C. uliginosum (M.Bieb.) Fisch.

A number of species have a similar flower colour but little resemblance otherwise: C. rivulare var. 'Atropurpureum' (Jacq.) All., C. borealinipponense Kitam., C. hachimantaiense Kadota, C. hidakamontanum Kadota, C. shimae Kadota, C. chokaiense Kitam., C. douglasii DC., C. occidentale (Nutt.) Jepson. Such a flower colour can result from hybrids between yellow-flowered C. eristhales and purple-flowered species (such as C. alsophilum, C. palustre, C. pannonicum, C. rivulare). Hybridisation between the ancestor of C. greimleri and a yellow-flowered species like C. eristhales or C. carniolicum may be the reason the former has a different flower colour from C. waldsteinii.

The unusually wide leaves of C. greimleri are even rarer in the genus. Apart from C. carniolicum, their width is approached only by Madeira endemic C. latifolium Lowe, with which there is little risk of confusion otherwise.

== Taxonomy ==
=== Etymology ===
The species is named after botanist Josef Greimler, whose chromosome count spurred the study that separated it from C. waldsteinii.

=== Phylogeny ===
Internally, C. greimleri populations are more genetically distinct from one another than C. waldsteinii populations, whose intrapopulation diversity, however, is higher than C. greimleri. The high interpopulation diversity could have more to do with interspecific hybridisation, but it could also be solely the result of two effects of tetraploidy: one which slows genetic drift, and another which homogenises migrating populations more effectively, such as during recolonisation following the Last Glacial Period. The low intrapopulation diversity of C. greimleri could be thanks to differences in the severity of glaciation between the Alps and the Carpathians.

Externally, a close relationship between C. greimleri, C. waldsteinii, and C. hypoleucum is suspected on morphological grounds. The relationship between C. greimleri and C. waldsteinii has already been confirmed genetically, although an allopolyploid origin of C. waldsteinii is strongly suggested. The relationship between C. greimleri and C. waldsteinii is so close that the intraspecific differences between females and hermaphrodites are higher than the interspecific differences.

C. waldsteinii was grouped with C. eristhales over C. greimleri in a 2023 paper, but the phylogeny was based on genome size, GC-content, achene length, and guard cell length, rather than genetics.

=== Taxonomic history ===
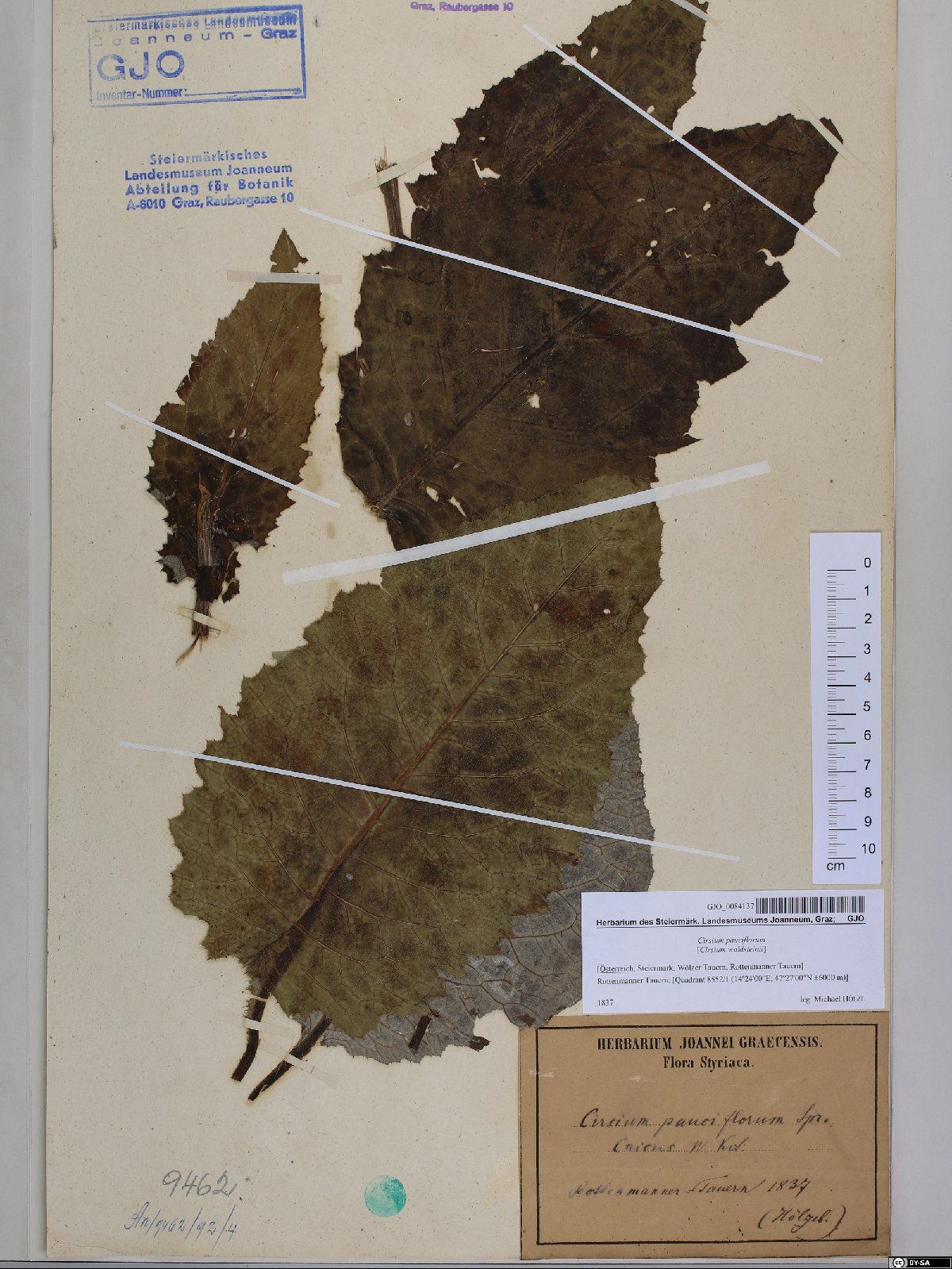
Precovery specimen collected by Michael Hölzl in 1837

Its holotype BRNU 658042 was collected by Petr Bureš at 1739 m from 47.271972°N 14.406250°E in the Rottenmann and Wölz Tauern on 15 September 2015. C. greimleri had been considered part of C. waldsteinii until 2018. In 2018, following the discovery that Alpine-Dinaric populations of "C. waldsteinii" were invariably diploid, whereas Carpathian populations were invariably tetraploid, the Alpine-Dinaric and Carpathian populations were split into two species. This decision was corroborated by physical and genetic evidence of separation.

All records before 2018 were published under other names, but the earliest published report of proleptic C. greimleri can be considered that of Host 1831, collected at Bürgersee near Judenburg and classified as Cnicus pauciflorus Kit.. Unpublished, the first record of what is now considered C. greimleri may have been a Tyrolian record in an 1807 catalogue by Johann Christoph Schleicher, but this is dubious.

It was first published within its present genus as Cirsium pauciflorum Spreng. by Anton Eleutherius Sauter following its discovery in Rottenmanner Tauern. In 1905, C. pauciflorum was recognised to be a younger homonym of C. pauciflorum Lam., which is now designated Carduus defloratus. Because of this, they assigned it a new name, C. waldsteinii.

The form that only grows to 30 cm was identified in 1902 and designated C. greimleri f. depressum by Eugen Johan Khek, The form with branches was designated C. greimleri var. ramosum by Khek after he identified it in 1906.

== Distribution and habitat ==
=== Distribution ===
It is found in the Eastern and Dinaric Alps. A partial but detailed map is designated Obr. 32b in Vavrinec 2020, which also provides distribution maps for its hybrids. A complete map was published in 2018, which includes flora-based ranges in the Dinarides, from which few precise coordinates exist yet, although many new ones were published in 2024. The precise ranges it has been found on include the Ennstal Alps, Rottenmann and Wölz Tauern, Seckau Tauern, Seetal Alps, Saualpe, Koralpe, Karawanks, Kamnik–Savinja Alps, Pohorje, Julian Alps, Snežnik, Srnetica, Klekovača, Cincar, Vranica, Bjelašnica, Visočica, Treskavica, Zelengora, Jahorina, Komovi, Golija, and Kopaonik.

On its own, its distribution is similar to that of Cardamine waldsteinii, and somewhat similar to those of Achillea clusiana, Moehringia ciliata, and Vicia oroboides. When taken together with C. waldsteinii, its circum-Pannonian distribution is similar to that of Crocus vernus agg., which also exhibits geographic differences in ploidy. Or to the acidophile species Hieracium transylvanicum. With less overlap, to Centaurea uniflora agg. or Pilosella alpicola. Including the Pontic and Caucasus, to Koeleria eriostachya. Including part of the Apennines, to Aposeris foetida.

=== Habitat ===
It is a subalpine and high montane species, found from 800 to 2000 m. It grows on moist downwind slopes and on roadsides in valleys with running water in the more montane part of its range, but also in more open scree forests in the more subalpine part of its range.

C. greimleri has an extremely low shade tolerance, (Note: Ellenberg Value L = 9.) 5 for temperature, (Note: Ellenberg Value T = 5.) requiring a continental climate (Note: Ellenberg Value K = 9.) with moderate soil moisture, (Note: Ellenberg Value F = 5.) It has no halotolerance. (Note: Ellenberg Value S = 0.) The overlapping, or coterminous Cirsium species with the greatest ecological similarity is C. arvense, followed by C. heterophyllum and C. spinosissimum. The species is calcifuge, requiring moderately acidic soil pH, (Note: Ellenberg Value R = 5.) but does sometimes grow on calcareous substrates, so long as it is very richly fertile soil. (Note: Ellenberg Value N = 8.)

== Ecology ==
=== Reproduction ===
Flowering is from late June to late July, to early August at sites of higher shade or altitude.

Plants are gynodioecious, some hermaphrodite and others female (rudimental synantheria, without developed pollen), in addition to sterile individuals that do not progress beyond rosette stage. Hermaphrodite flowers can be distinguished visually by the protrusion of their synantherium from the corolla, by colour of their synantherium, by the pollen pushed out by an elongating style at full anthesis (female synantheria lack pollen). Hermaphrodite synantheria are longer, at 6.7 to 9.3 mm, (Note: minimum 6.3 mm, maximum 9.4 mm) compared to female synantheria, at 4.3 to 5.7 (Note: minimum 4.2 mm, maximum 6.5 mm) mm. The same applies to styles, 20 to 25 mm (Note: minimum 18.3 mm, maximum 25.7 mm) in hermaphrodites, and 18.0 to 22.4 mm (Note: minimum 16.5 mm, maximum 23.3 mm) in females. Although both hermaphrodite and female stigmas can be straight, only female stigmas can be twisted, and usually are.

The smaller size of female achenes relative to hermaphrodite achenes in this species is unusual. Usually the reverse is the case, which has been explained as a compensation for the genetic disadvantage of females relative to hermaphrodites, and as a result of the absence of inbreeding depression. Suggested explanations for the aberrance of C. greimleri and C. waldsteinii include larger achene count, higher germanation rates, and lower infestation with achene predators like the Tephritidae and Curculionidae.

=== Hybridisation ===
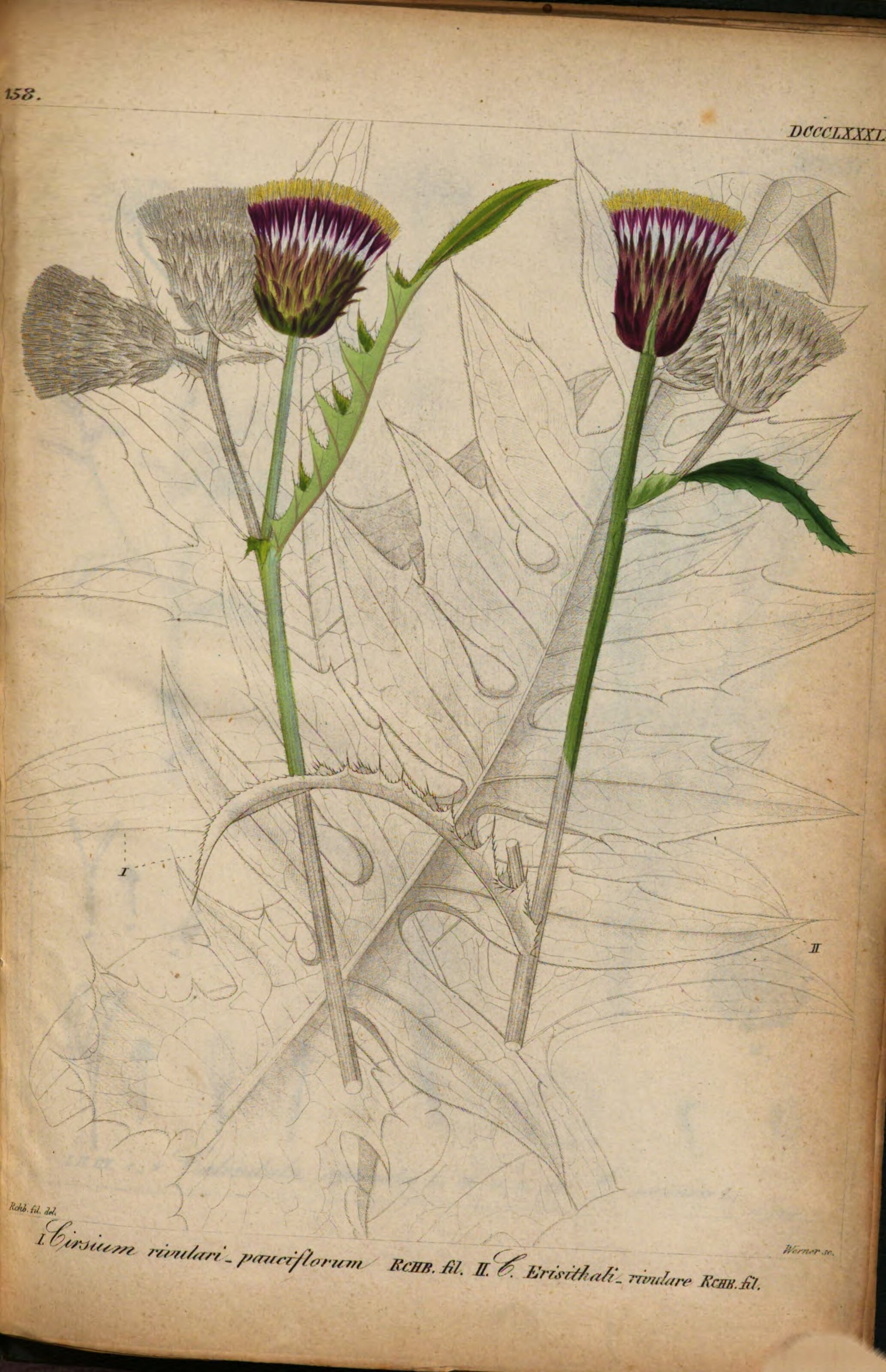
Illustration of Cirsium × stiriacum (left) by Werner published 1853

The following hybrids have been reported:

- C. × juratzkae Reichardt ex Heimerl = C. greimleri × C. heterophyllum.
- C. × przybylskii Eichenfeld = C. greimleri × C. oleraceum.
- C. × reichardtii Juratzka = C. greimleri × C. palustre.
- C. × stiriacum Fritsch = C. greimleri × C. rivulare.
- C. × stroblii Hayek = C. greimleri × C. spinosissimum.
- C. × sudae Michálková & Bureš = C. carniolicum × C. greimleri Melzer.
- C. × scopolii E. Khek. ex Leuter et Zeitler = C. erisithales × C. greimleri.

Of the Cirsium species native to the northern part of its range, the greatest geographic overlap is with C. palustre, C. arvense, C. vulgare, and C. oleraceum. There is high overlap with C. eristhales and C. heterophyllum. There is moderate overlap with C. rivulare. There is low overlap with C. spinosissimum and C. carniolicum. There is very little overlap with, C. pannonicum, C. acaule, and no overlap with C. alsophilum, C. brachycephalum, C. canum. Though the lack of overlap with C. alsophilum, also a mountainous species with a presence in the Alps and Dinarides, is not certain at least for the Dinaric portion of its range.

Despite high range overlap, C. greimleri does not hybridise with C. arvense, which may be due to intersectional incompatibility.

=== Associations ===
C. greimleri grows in forests dominated by Acer pseudoplatanus, Alnus incana, Betula pendula, Corylus avellana, Fagus sylvatica, Larix decidua, Picea abies, Pinus cembra, and Sorbus aucuparia.

It is often found in association with other subalpine tall forbs, such as Adenostyles alliariae, Athyrium filix-femina, Calluna vulgaris, Cerastium lanatum, Chaerophyllum hirsutum, Chamaenerion angustifolium, Cicerbita alpina, Doronicum austriacum, Dryopteris filix-mas, Erigeron glabratus, Gentiana asclepiadea, Hieracium laevigatum, Hieracium lachenalii, Hieracium sylvaticum, Lactuca muralis, Peucedanum ostruthium, Phyteuma spicatum, Pleurospermum austriacum, Polypodium vulgare, Prenanthes purpurea, Senecio nemorensis agg., Senecio ovatus, Struthiopteris spicant, Telekia speciosa, Vaccinium myrtillus, Valeriana tripteris, Veratrum lobelianum, and Veronica urticifolia.

Among the shorter species it associates with are Aremonia agrimonoides, Artemisia umbelliformis, Cardamine enneaphyllos, Cardamine trifolia, Cerastium lanatum, Lamium orvala, Omphalodes verna, Sanicula epipactis, and Vicia oroboides.

It forms part of the Pinion mugo type of Krummholz vegetation in the Dinarics. It is sometimes an element of the Scabioso hladnikianae-Grafietum golakae Čarni association. It is a rare element of the Calamagrostion arundinaceae association, the Huperzio-Alnetum viridis Mulgedio-Aconitetea Hadac & Klika ex Klika (1948) subassociation, and the Polysticho-lonchitis-fagetum rhododendrotosum hirsuti Boštjan & Rakaj subassociation. It is also found in the associations EU 6170 Adenostylion, Cirsio cani-Filipenduletum ulmariae, Caricion davallianae, and Veronico-Calitrichetum.

== Conservation ==
It readily forms hybrids, with the highest degree of promiscuity in its genus among the Cirsium species of the Pannonian Basin, leaving it vulnerable to genetic erosion through local imbalances in pollen production, leading to unidirectional geneflow, for which reason it is regarded as an endangered species. Most populations consist of only a few to several hundreds of individuals, and only the Koralpe and Seetaler Alpen have known populations with over a thousand. Within its genus, an erosion risk is not unique to C. greimleri, applying also to C. alsophilum, C. bertolonii, and C. carniolicum.

A collection of seeds (Note: Catalogued as AT-0-GZU-14 141.) for the Millennium Seed Bank was made in 2014.

== See also ==
- List of Cirsium species
