= Cirsium × stroblii =

Scientific classification
- Kingdom: Plantae
- Clade: Tracheophytes
- Clade: Angiosperms
- Clade: Eudicots
- Clade: Asterids
- Order: Asterales
- Family: Asteraceae
- Genus: Cirsium
- Species: C. × stroblii

Binomial name
- Cirsium × stroblii Hayek

Hybrid of thistle

Cirsium × stroblii (Cirsium greimleri × spinosissimum) is a hybrid between C. greimleri and C. spinosissimum.

3 herbarium specimens as of 2020.

== Distribution ==
It is found only in the Rottenmann and Wölz Tauern, although the range overlap extends to nearby ranges.

== Description ==
There are few specimens, but it is close in appearance to C. heterophyllum × spinosissimum, differing in having broader leaves with short lobes, without tomentose undersides.

The description of von Halácsy:

Stem erect, simple until the inflorescence, especially in the upper part sparsely arachnoid, not winged. The leaves on the upper page are covered with scattered appressed hairs; on the lower leaves they are sparsely arachnoid-woolly, somewhat grayish; the lower leaves are ovate in circumference, with length twice their width, suddenly narrowed into a shorter petiole, deeply pinnately lobed with 6-7 broadly rhomboid pinnately lobed lobes, with sharp lobes emerging into a thin spine and thinly acuminate teeth; the middle and upper leaves are similar, the latter somewhat narrower and the auriculate-amplexicaul base sessile. The three or four heads are subsessile at the apex of the stem, the leaves are ovate-lanceolate, deeply acuminate-toothed or bidentate, the lower heads of which exceed about half; suffulta 2 cm long. Scales are anthode ovate-lanceolate, subpuberulous purple at the apex, the lower ones attenuated into a long spiny subpalatal tip, the upper attenuated spine unarmed. Flowers citrous, purple-suffused. It differs from C. greimleri in the stem up to the leaf inflorescence, simple, with narrower leaves less tomentose and pinnatized beneath, erect heads, supported by leaves; from C. spinosissimum with wider leaves, less strong spines, denser pubescence, from both flower colors. It hardly differs from the highly polymorphic hybrid C. × juratzkae in its wider leaves, not tomentose underneathm and its broad, short lobed leaf blades.

— Heinrich Gustav Reichenbach, Versammlung (1907)

== History ==
Identified by August von Hayek in the summer of 1906 from a specimen collected on the slopes of a ravine that feeds the Großer Bösenstein lake by Gabriel Strobl in 1867.

== See also ==
- List of Cirsium species
