= Melancholy thistle =

Melancholy thistle is a common name for several plants and may refer to:

- Cirsium helenioides
- Cirsium heterophyllum
