= Cirsium lanceolatum =

Cirsium lanceolatum may refer to:

- Cirsium lanceolatum (L.) Scop., a synonym of Cirsium vulgare subsp. vulgare, also known as spear thistle or common thistle
- Cirsium lanceolatum Hill, a synonym of Cirsium dissectum (L.) Hill, also known as meadow thistle
