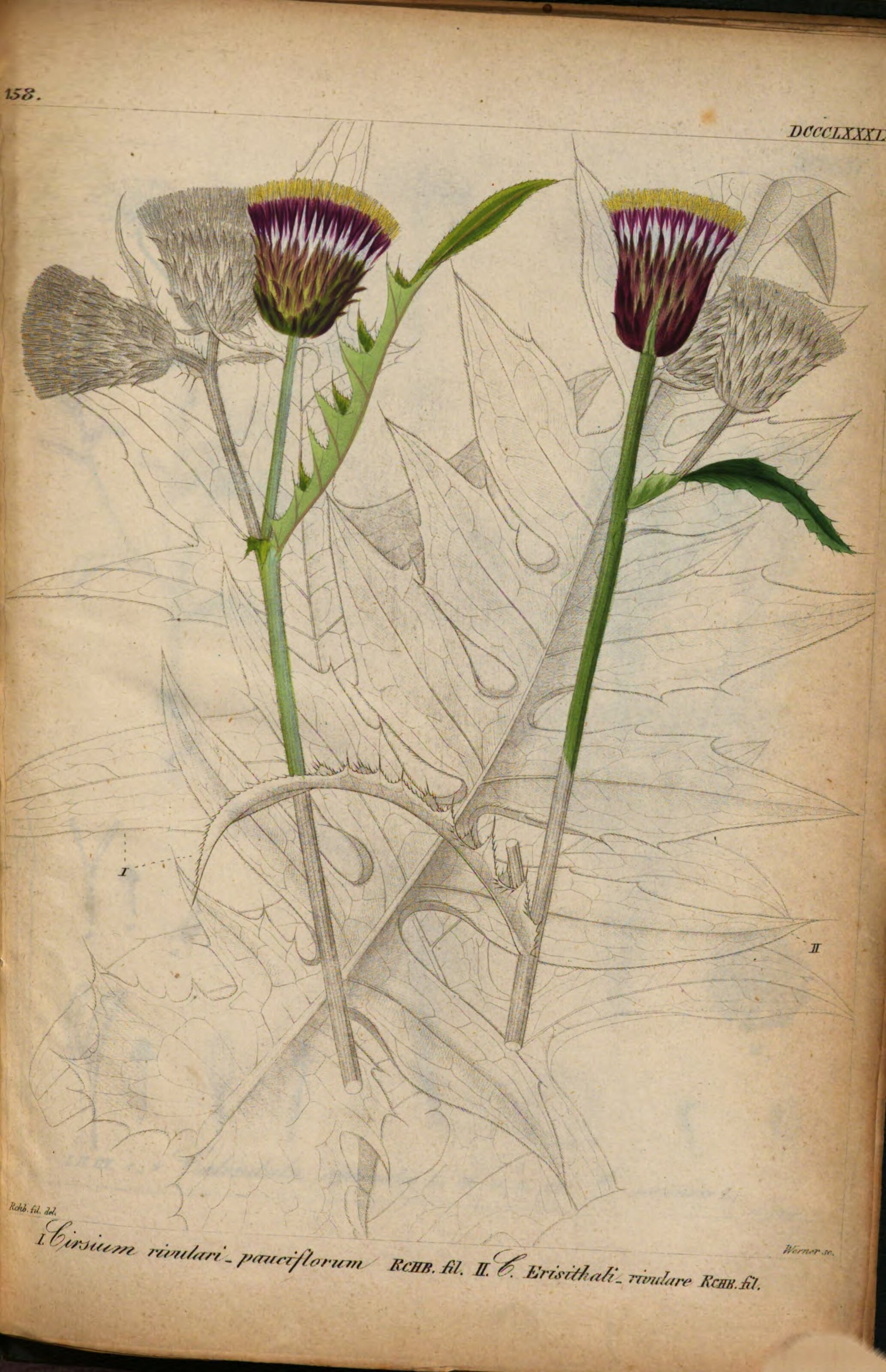
- Illustration of Cirsium × stiriacum (left) by Werner published 1853

Scientific classification
- Kingdom: Plantae
- Clade: Tracheophytes
- Clade: Angiosperms
- Clade: Eudicots
- Clade: Asterids
- Order: Asterales
- Family: Asteraceae
- Genus: Cirsium
- Species: C. × stiriacum

Binomial name
- Cirsium × stiriacum Fritsch

= Cirsium × stiriacum =

Hybrid of thistle

Cirsium × stiriacum (Cirsium greimleri × rivulare) is a hybrid between C. greimleri and C. rivulare.

It is a rare hybrid, known from only 4 herbarium specimens as of 2020.

== Distribution ==
It is found only in the Lavanttal Alps and Karawanks.

== Description ==
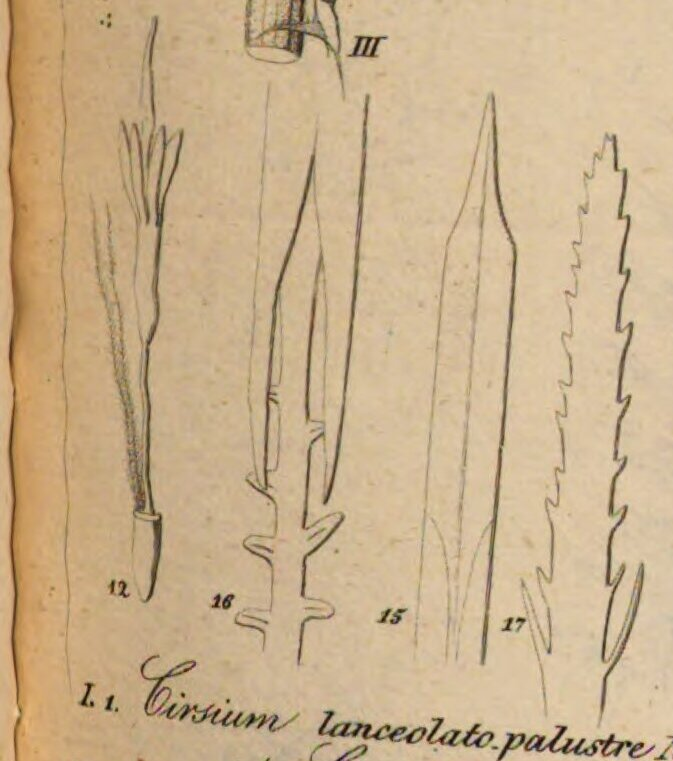
Illustration of Cirsium × stiriacum parts by Werner published 1853.

The type specimen was more similar to C. greimleri than to C. rivulare, but bore pinnately divided leaves, too thinly webbed on the underside for pure C. greimleri.

The description of Reichenbach:

Stems furrowed, slightly hairy; branched at the top, fairly hairless there; head-bearing branches evenly arranged; heads sometimes almost sessile; leaves encircling the stem, sinuously pinnate, sections triangular, here and there coarsely toothed or serrated; surface of the leaves sparse, veins somewhat more glandular-hairy; heads elongated, supporting linear, narrow, intact leaves; bracts lanceolate, dagger-pointed, protruding from the tip to the middle, sticky keeled, ciliate at the edge, protruding at the tip; flower border equal in length to the tube; truncated at the tip; somewhat lobed. Heads large. Flowers dark purple.

— Heinrich Gustav Reichenbach, Deutschlands Flora (1853)

== Taxonomy ==
Identified on 29 June 1903 by Karl Fritsch in the Lassnitz valley. Although earlier authors believed it had been found by Tommasini on Snežnik, that record was doubted by subsequent authors.

== See also ==
- List of Cirsium species
