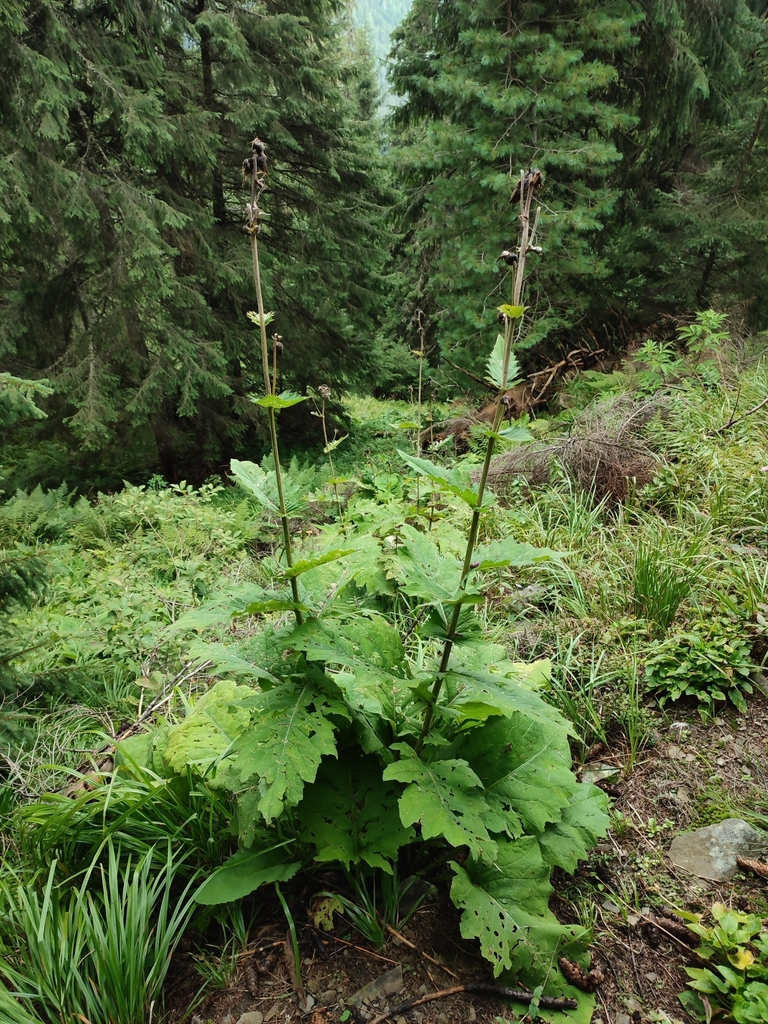

Scientific classification
- Kingdom: Plantae
- Clade: Embryophytes
- Clade: Tracheophytes
- Clade: Spermatophytes
- Clade: Angiosperms
- Clade: Eudicots
- Clade: Asterids
- Order: Asterales
- Family: Asteraceae
- Genus: Cirsium
- Species: C. waldsteinii

Binomial name
- Cirsium waldsteinii Ruoy
- Range of C. waldsteinii (precise locations only). A more complete map was published in 2018.

Synonyms
- Synonymy: Cirsium pauciflorum (Waldst. & Kit.) Sprengel non Lam.; Cnicus pauciflorus Waldst. & Kit.

= Cirsium waldsteinii =

Species of thistle

Cirsium waldsteinii, the Waldstein's thistle or East Carpathian thistle, is a species of flowering plant belonging to the family Asteraceae. It is closely related to C. greimleri, which was recently split from it. It is a tall herbaceous plant with nodding purple flowers growing in high montane to subalpine habitats on exposed acidic slopes. It is native to Eastern Europe, and specifically the Carpathians. As a tetraploid species, it does not hybridise readily.

== Distribution ==
It is found in the East and South Carpathians. A complete map was published in 2018.

== Description ==
Taproots thick with many branching rootlets.

Plants grow to a height of 50-150[-200] cm. Stems are simple or have few branches. Up to 6 pedicels. Growth is erect but nodding below the capitula. Leaves grow all along the stem.

Basal leaves are [8.1-]9.0-26.1[-28.7] cm wide and [1.3-]1.4-2.2[-2.8] cm longer than wide in mature specimens. Their morphology ranges from ovate, to orbicular, to deltate especially in younger leaves. Peduncular leaves amplexicaul, often auriculate. Their pinnate lobes are doubly serrate, with weak spinules up to 2 mm situated at the edges, pubescent above and arachnoid-lanate below.

Flowers are capitula, each with 3-8 flowers. Involucre (Note: In sensu Asteraceae.) dimensions are [15-]17-23 × 15-22 mm at flowering. Individual bracts flare out from the bud, with distinct vittae, the outer and inner bracts being distinguished by the presence and absence, respectively, of a visible spine. Involucres are greenish purple to brownish purple.

Corolla length is [14.5-]15.3-21.9[-23.1] mm. At full anthesis, corollae average greyish violet, but can be purple to greyish violet or darker (the latter overlapping with C. greimleri). During fading, corollae average deep magenta or greyish violet, but can also be lighter to darker shades of greyish magenta. All colour values are given in the Methuen system.

Strongly anemochorous, its fruits contain [3.8-]4.2-5.3[-5.8] cm. achenes attached to [14.0-]14.3-19.8[-20.4] mm pappi.

=== Micromorphology ===
Stomatal guard cells are [16.6-]20.9[-27.9] μm long and [5.0-]8.9[-15.3]μm wide.

=== Lookalikes ===
No close lookalikes are coterminous, but a number of species can be difficult to distinguish from it:

- Cirsium greimleri is genetically close and almost identical in appearance. In the field, the main distinguishing traits are lobe depth and flower colour. Although their basal leaves are roughly equal in width, the cauline leaves of C. waldsteinii are significantly wider, though the significantly deeper lobes of the latter may create the appearance of narrowness. The corollae of C. waldsteinii are lighter in colour at any given stage, with little overlap in hue after opening (though both can be greyish violet at full bloom). This comparison must be made between flowers of roughly equal stage. Its stems below the capitula are completely covered, whereas those of C. waldsteinii show some green.
- Cirsium hypoleucum. The leaves of C. hypoleucum, sometimes resembling C. greimleri more than C. waldsteinii, are white-tomentose beneath, in contrast to the greyish-arachnoid leaves of C. waldsteinii. The involucral bracts of C. waldsteinii gradually become longer inward. The involucres of C. hypoleucum differ markedly in colour from those of C. waldsteinii, and the involucres themselves are narrower. The idumentum of subcapitular stem is sparser.
- Cirsium oblongifolium. It has longer, more oblong leaves. Even the undersides of the leaves are glabrous. Glabrous undersides are also characteristic of the similar-looking species Cirsium pseudopersonata and Cirsium sychnosanthum.
- Cirsium uliginosum.

== Life cycle ==
Perennial.

=== Reproduction ===
Flowering is from mid June to mid July, to late July or even September at sites of higher shade or altitude.

Plants are gynodioecious.

The smaller size of female achenes relative to hermaphrodite achenes in this species is unusual. Usually the reverse is the case, which has been explained as a compensation for the genetic disadvantage of females relative to hermaphrodites, and as a result of the absence of inbreeding depression. Suggested explanations for the aberrance in C. greimleri and C. waldsteinii include larger achene count, higher germanation rates, and lower infestation with achene predators like the Tephritidae and Curculionidae.

=== Hybridisation ===
C. waldsteinii is a tetraploid species with sporophytic chromosome number 2n=4x=68, without variation. Its somatic nuclear DNA size is [3534-]3682[-3932] Mbp.

As a tetraploid in a diploid dominated genus, it does not hybridise readily, similar to C. vulgare. But it has not achieved full reproductive isolation.

The following hybrids have been reported:

- C. eristhales × waldsteinii Bureš (a few herb. specimens from Făgăraș Mountains and Călimani Mountains)
- C. palustre × waldsteinii Nyár. (1 herb. specimen from the Lopushanka River valley near Yasinia, 1 report from Hoverla)
- C. rivulare × waldsteinii Schur

== Habitat ==
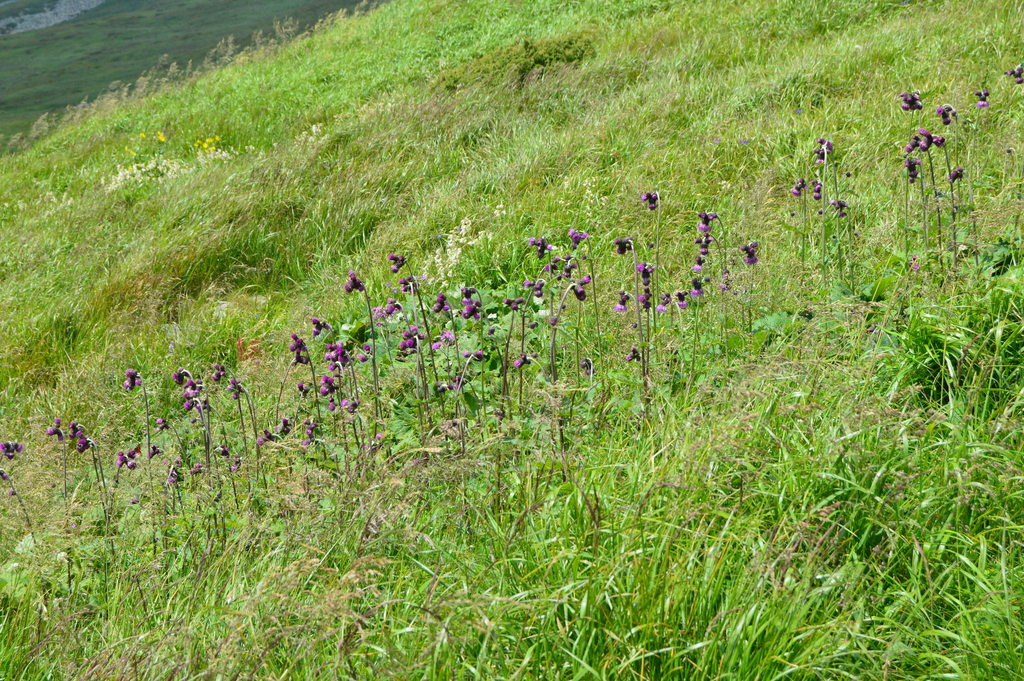
On a grassy slope in the Carpathians

It is a subalpine species.

Prefers damp and shady places. It is a calcifuge species.

Grows on forest meadows, clearings, and edges. But also above the treeline, among scrubs and on talus.

== Taxonomy ==
Internally, C. waldsteinii populations are less genetically distinct from one another than C. greimleri populations, whose intrapopulation diversity however is lower than C. greimleri. The low interpopulation diversity could have more to do with interspecific hybridisation, but it could also be solely the result of two effects of tetraploidy: one which slows genetic drift, and another which homogenises migrating populations more effectively such as during recolonisation following the Last Glacial Period. The high intrapopulation diversity of C. waldsteinii could be thanks to differences in the severity of glaciation between the Alps and the Carpathians.

Externally, C. waldsteinii was grouped with C. eristhales over C. greimleri in a 2023 paper, but the phylogeny was based on genome size, GC content, achene length, and guard cell length, rather than genetics.

=== Taxonomic history ===
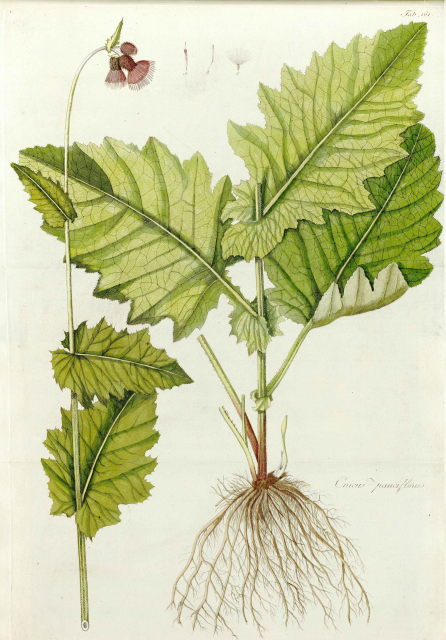
Illustration in Waldstein and Kitaibel 1803

Its holotype, kept at the Herbarium Kitaibelianum on sheet XXVIII, No. 123, was collected by Pál Kitaibel near Pietrosul Rodnei in the Rodna Mountains on 6 August 1796.

C. waldsteinii was first described as Cnicus pauciflorus by Kitaibel and von Waldstein, swiftly accepted by Willdenow.

C. greimleri was considered part of C. waldsteinii until 2018.

Early descriptions:

- Nyman, Carl Fredrik (1878–1882). "C. pauciflorum". Conspectus florae Europaeae, seu enumeratio methodica plantarum phanerogamarum europae indigenarum, indicatio distributionis geographicae singularum. Vol. 2. p. 408. "C. pauciflorum Spr. — Carn. Croat. Hung. Banat. Transs. Galic. Bucov. Serb. Bosn. Herceg.(r.). Etiam Cephal. m. Oenos sec. Rchb. f. Sec. cl. Naegeli hybr. est (C. Eristhali heterophyllum). — C. helenioides Bmg. * C. ambiguum K. (non All.) Cnicus ambigus Schleich. cat. 1807. Tyrol. etc."
- Sprengel, Philipp Carl (1826). "Cirsium pauciflorum". Systema vegetabilium. Vol. 3 (16th ed.). pp. 375–376. "C. foliis amplis ovatis angulato-denttis ciliato-ſerratis ſcabris, inferioribus petiolatis baſi auriculatis, ſuperioribus amplexiculibus, pedunculis elongatis 3floris, ſquamis anthodii glutinoſi patulis. Hungaria."
- Persoon, Christiaan Hendrik (1805). "Carduus". Synopsis plantarum, seu Enchiridium botanicum, complectens enumerationem systematicam specierum hucusque cognitarum. Vol. 2. pp. 384–390. "Carduus pauciflorus, fol. amplexicaulibus ovatis sublyratis ciliato-serratis scabris, radicalibus lyratis, flor. glomeratis, squamis calycinis lanceolatis interiorib. patulis. ... Hab. in montib. Hungariae, sylvis arenosis. Pedunc. terminalis subbiflorus. Fol. maxima. Flor. purpurei. ♂"
- Willdenow, Carl Ludwig (1803). "Cnicus pauciflorus". Caroli a Linné species plantarum exhibentes plantas rite cognitas, ad genera relatas, cum differentiis specificis, nominibus trivialibus, synonymis selectis, locis natalibus secundum systema sexuale digestas. Vol. 3, 3 (5th ed.). p. 1677.
- Kitaibel, Pál; von Waldstein, Franz de Paula Adam Norbert Wenzel Ludwig Valentin (1803). "Cnicus pauciflorus". Descriptiones et icones plantarum rariorum Hungariae. Vol. 2. pp. 175–176.

== Ecology ==
Associated with low density spruce forests.

== See also ==
- List of Cirsium species
