= Cirsium × scopolii =

Scientific classification
- Kingdom: Plantae
- Clade: Tracheophytes
- Clade: Angiosperms
- Clade: Eudicots
- Clade: Asterids
- Order: Asterales
- Family: Asteraceae
- Genus: Cirsium
- Species: C. × scopolii

Binomial name
- Cirsium × scopolii E. Khek. ex Leuter et Zeitler

Hybrid of thistle

Cirsium × scopolii (Cirsium erisithales × greimleri) is a hybrid between C. erisithales and C. greimleri. It is known from 48 herbarium specimens as of 2020.

== Distribution ==
It is found almost throughout the range of C. greimleri.

== Description ==
Traits are thoroughly mixed.

The description of Fritsch:

The first thing that strikes you about this plant is that the involucral scales are very sticky, which is also known to be the case with one of the parent species, C. eristhales (L.) Scop. The corolla is 18 mm long, of which 7-8 mm are on the cylindrical part of the tube. It is whitish in colour: only the tips are tinged with pink and light purple at the tip. The tips are very unequal, the shortest 4 mm, the longest 7 mm long. The style is 23 mm long; its lower part is white, only slightly tinged with pink immediately before the fork; the 4 mm long style branches are light purple. The pollen is well developed, despite the hybridity of the plant being beyond doubt, and is covered with short, broad spines, similar to that of C. arvense (L.) Scop. according to the illustration by H. Müller.

— Karl Fritsch, Blütenbiologische Untersuchungen verschiedener Pflanzen der Flora von Steiermark (1905)

== History ==
First identified on 13 July 1845 by Tommasini or more likely one of his collectors on Snežnik. But its first written mention dates to 1856. The first binary name published, C. × scopolii Sch.Bip. ex Nyman (1879), is a nomen nudum, which also applies to C. × scopolianum Sch.Bip. ex Focke (1881), making the first currently valid name that published by Khek in 1908, whose investigation was sparked by recent publications.

== See also ==
- List of Cirsium species
