= Cirsium × juratzkae =

Scientific classification
- Kingdom: Plantae
- Clade: Tracheophytes
- Clade: Angiosperms
- Clade: Eudicots
- Clade: Asterids
- Order: Asterales
- Family: Asteraceae
- Genus: Cirsium
- Species: C. × juratzkae

Binomial name
- Cirsium × juratzkae Reichardt ex Heimerl

Hybrid of thistle

Cirsium × juratzkae (Cirsium greimleri × heterophyllum) is a hybrid between C. greimleri and C. heterophyllum.

It is known from 58 herbarium specimens as of 2020.

== Distribution ==
It is found in the Rottenmann and Wölz Tauern, Schladming Tauern, Seckau Tauern, and Lavanttal Alps.

== Description ==
Although the growth is more similar to C. heterophyllum and the flowers more similar to C. greimleri, the leaves of the hybrids are intermediate between both parents, with significant variation. But two forms are known.

The description of Reichardt:

Its growth is generally similar to that of C. heterophyllum The leaves are intermediate in shape between those of the two parent plants, are densely covered with arachnid webs on the underside (but not snow-white and felted like C. heterophyllum) and have the double toothing of C. greimleri. The heads are supported by linear bracts and are found either singly or in groups of two or three at the tip of the individual branches; they are nodding like C. greimleri and are completely identical in shape and size to this species. The corollas are also similar in size to the last-mentioned species. ... Its characteristics are as follows: The stem is 4-5' high, furrowed and especially in its upper part arachnid-webbed, below it is sparsely leafy, above it is almost naked, multiply branched; the branches are 6-10" long, densely arachnid-webbed. The leaves are of various shapes; the basal ones are 1' long, oblong, stalked, with a 7-8" long blade that gradually tapers into the 4-5" long petiole and a blunt tip; the lower stem leaves are oblong, 5-6" long, sessile, with the round ears of the narrowed base enclosing the stem; the upper leaves are lanceolate, sessile, with the heart-shaped base enclosing the stem and gradually merging into the linear, 5-6" long bracts that support the individual heads. All leaves are pinnately veined, unevenly doubly toothed and spiny-ciliated on the edge; scattered hairs on the upper side, densely white and cobwebbed on the underside between the clearly protruding veins. The heads are supported by linear bracts, single at the tip of the branches, two or three at the end of the main axis and then 6-8" long stalked, all nodding, roundish, on average 8''' in diameter. The scales of the involucre are brownish red, compressed, defenseless, not ciliated on the edge; the outer ones are lanceolate, 2 1/3''' long, 1''' wide, the inner ones linear, 7''' long, 1''' wide. The flowers dark purple-red, (female) 9''' long ((l. and f. 6'")/(t. 3'")), in two specimens among the original parents in the Gotsgraben near Kallwang. This plant has the habit of C. heterophyllum All, particularly because of the almost bare stem in the upper part. The leaves are exactly halfway between the two original parents in shape and veining; from C. greimleri they have in particular the striking width, the leaf blade which narrows towards the base on the lower stem leaves, which encloses the stem with its two round lobes and finally the double, irregular serration on the edge. From C. heterophyllum in contrast, the basal leaves in particular have an elongated shape, a blade that narrows into the petiole and, above all, a dense white covering on the underside. The heads are almost identical to C. pauciflorum in terms of the bracts that support them, their nodding, their crowded position, their size and their shape. The same relationship is also evident in the dimensions of the corollas, which are only 1 1/3''' longer than those of C. pauciflorum Spreng., and are very reminiscent of this species.

— Heinrich Wilhelm Reichardt, Beitrag zur Kenntniss der Cirsien Steiermarks (1861)

== History ==
It was named after Jakob Juratzka. It was described as one of the most "stately and beautiful" hybrids by Heinrich Wilhelm Reichardt, who identified it in 1861 near Bretstein and near Breitenau am Hochlantsch, both at 1400 m.

== See also ==
- List of Cirsium species
