= Cirsium × sudae =

Scientific classification
- Kingdom: Plantae
- Clade: Tracheophytes
- Clade: Angiosperms
- Clade: Eudicots
- Clade: Asterids
- Order: Asterales
- Family: Asteraceae
- Genus: Cirsium
- Species: C. × sudae

Binomial name
- Cirsium × sudae Michálková & Bureš

Hybrid species of plant

Cirsium × sudae (Cirsium carniolicum × greimleri) is a hybrid between C. carniolicum and C. greimleri.

Possibly endemic to the Karawanks, the only range it has been found in so far and almost the only range where the two species overlap.

It is known from 1 herbarium specimen as of 2020.

== See also ==
- List of Cirsium species
