= Cirsium × reichardtii =

Scientific classification
- Kingdom: Plantae
- Clade: Tracheophytes
- Clade: Angiosperms
- Clade: Eudicots
- Clade: Asterids
- Order: Asterales
- Family: Asteraceae
- Genus: Cirsium
- Species: C. × reichardtii

Binomial name
- Cirsium × reichardtii Juratzka

Hybrid of thistle

Cirsium × reichardtii (Cirsium greimleri × palustre) is a hybrid between C. greimleri and C. palustre.

It is known from 38 herbarium specimens as of 2020.

== Distribution ==
It is found in the Rottenmann and Wölz Tauern, Schladming Tauern, Seckau Tauern, Lavanttal Alps, and Karawanks.

== Description ==
The flowers tend to appear close to C. greimleri, but there is variation between individuals closer to C. greimleri and individuals closer to C. palustre.

The description of Juratzka:

Rhizome unnotable. Stem protruding only in the upper part; lower part denser above more distantly leafy slightly arachnoid with articulated hairs (C. palustre), sparsely branched above, with sub-elongated arachnoid branches (common peduncles). Oblong leaves (lower to 7 lines long and 4 lines wide) rounded-eared, lower to the length of a line, running sinuate-pinnatisect spinose-ciliate, with the lower fins equaling part of the blade in length, with 2-3 subsuperior lobes, oblong-triangular anterior lobes, sparsely hairy above (as in C. palustre), densely cano-arachnoid below; ribs with scattered soft articulated hairs. Capitula on peduncles in pairs and in threes, pedicels 1-3 lines long white-tomentose indentations with filioloque suffulta. Involucres brownish-purple scales appressed to a viscous carina, the margin a little arachnoid obsolete spiny, violet-purple flowers (male) 7 1/2 lines (limb c. throat 4 1/2 lines, tube 3 lines) long.

— Jakob Juratzka, Cirsium Reichardtii (1859)

== History ==
First identified September 1858 by Heinrich Wilhelm Reichardt near Eisenkappel-Vellach on the road to Belska Kočna. and described by Juratzka in 1859.

== See also ==
- List of Cirsium species
