= Cirsium × przybylzkii =

Scientific classification
- Kingdom: Plantae
- Clade: Tracheophytes
- Clade: Angiosperms
- Clade: Eudicots
- Clade: Asterids
- Order: Asterales
- Family: Asteraceae
- Genus: Cirsium
- Species: C. × przybylzkii

Binomial name
- Cirsium × przybylzkii Eichenfeld

Hybrid of thistle

Cirsium × przybylzkii (Cirsium greimleri × oleraceum) is a hybrid between Cirsium greimleri and Cirsium oleraceum.

It is known from 16 herbarium specimens as of 2020.

== Distribution ==
It is found in the Rottenmann and Wölz Tauern, Schladming Tauern, Seckau Tauern, Lavanttal Alps, and Karawanks.

== Description ==
Cirsium greimleri dominates flower traits, albeit with intermediate colour. C. oleraceum and C. greimleri alternately dominate leaf traits, sometimes with intermediate traits such as a C. oleraceum like form with C. greimleri indumentum.

The description of von Eichenfeld:

Stem and foliage arachnoid above, with short arachnoid peduncles; with amplexicaul leaves beneath arachnoid ovate oblong, below petiolate, upper sessile, pinnatifid or pinnatisect, ovate pinnae horizontal or facing forward, 5-6 clustered, cylindrical, bractate leaves; anthodial scales slightly purple, linear-lanceolate, tapering into a short spine, open at the tip; corolla from ochre-white purple rim longer than the tube.

— Michael Ritter von Eichenfeld, Cirsium Przybylskii (nov. hybr.) (1887)

== History ==
Identified by pharmacist B. Przybylski on 20 July 1885, after whom Michael Ritter von Eichenfeld named it.

== See also ==
- List of Cirsium species
