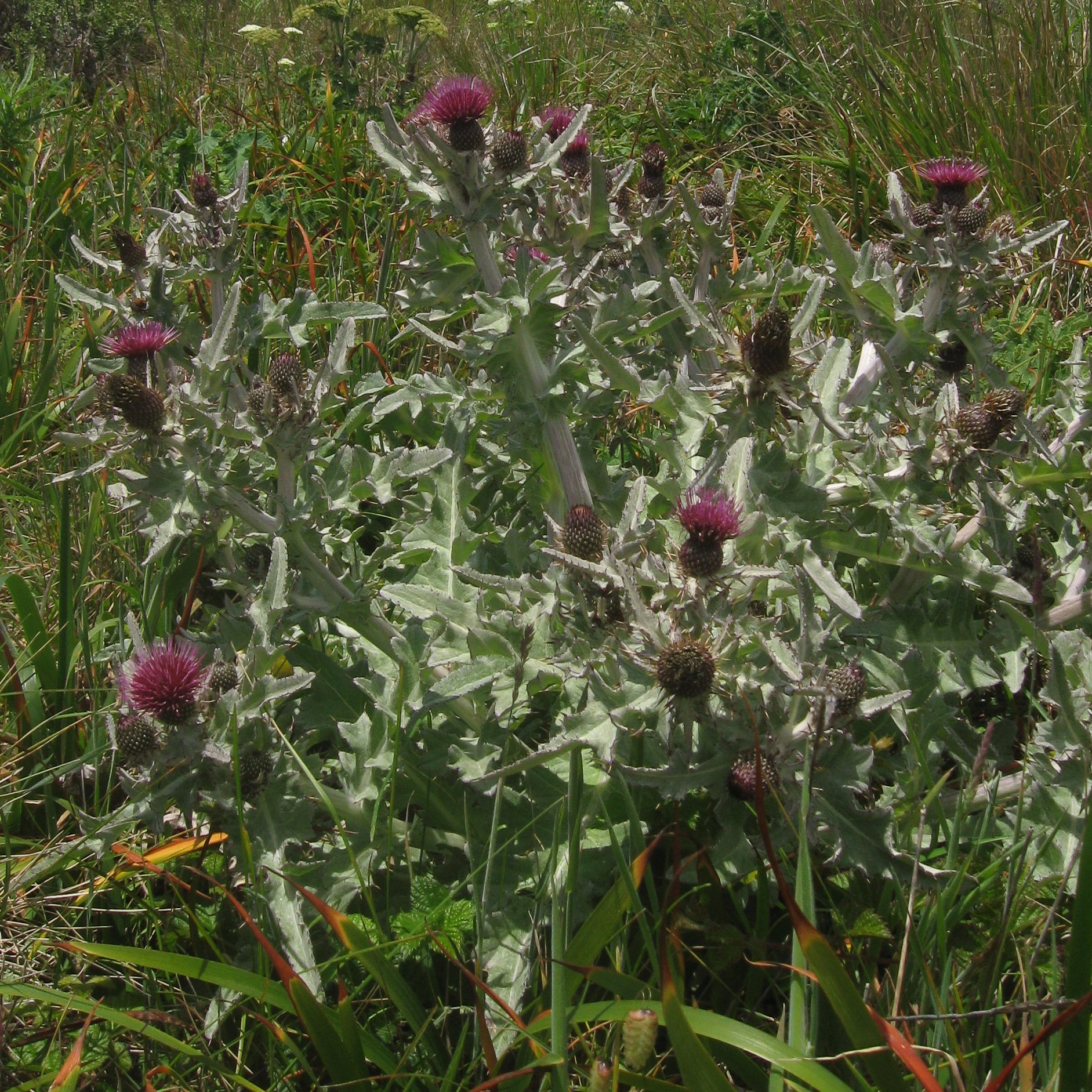

Scientific classification
- Kingdom: Plantae
- Clade: Tracheophytes
- Clade: Angiosperms
- Clade: Eudicots
- Clade: Asterids
- Order: Asterales
- Family: Asteraceae
- Genus: Cirsium
- Species: C. douglasii

Binomial name
- Cirsium douglasii DC.

Synonyms
- Synonymy: Carduus undulatus var. douglasii (DC.) Greene; Cirsium breweri var. glutinosum Petr.; Cirsium breweri var. wrangelii Petr.; Cirsium breweri subsp. wrangelii Petr.; Carduus breweri (A.Gray) Greene, syn of var. breweri; Cirsium breweri (A.Gray) Jeps., syn of var. breweri; Cirsium breweri var. canescens Petr., syn of var. breweri; Cirsium breweri var. lanosissimum Petr., syn of var. breweri; Cirsium douglasii var. canescens (Petr.) J.T.Howell, syn of var. breweri; Cnicus breweri A.Gray, syn of var. breweri

= Cirsium douglasii =

Species of thistle

Cirsium douglasii is a species of thistle known by the common names Douglas' thistle and California swamp thistle.

It is native to the central coast and northern California ranges, foothills, and plateaus, and adjacent parts of southern Oregon and northwest Nevada. It grows in wet places in a number of types of habitat.

== Description ==
This native thistle, Cirsium douglasii, is a biennial or short-lived perennial herb growing up to 2.5 metres (8.2 ft) tall, with a branching woolly stem. The longest gray-tomentose leaves, located about the base of the plant, are up to 1 metre (3.3 ft) long. They are sometimes lobed or toothed and are borne on a spiny petiole.

The inflorescence is a cluster of several flower heads surrounded by small leaves. Each flower head is up to 3 centimetres (1.2 in) long and lined with purple-tipped spiny phyllaries. The head contains purple or white flowers. The fruit is a dark-colored achene 2–4.5 millimetres (0.079–0.177 in) long/diameter with a pappus which may reach 2 centimetres (0.79 in) in length.

Varieties

- Cirsium douglasii var. breweri (A.Gray) D.J.Keil & C.E.Turner - California, Oregon, Nevada
- Cirsium douglasii var. douglasii - California
