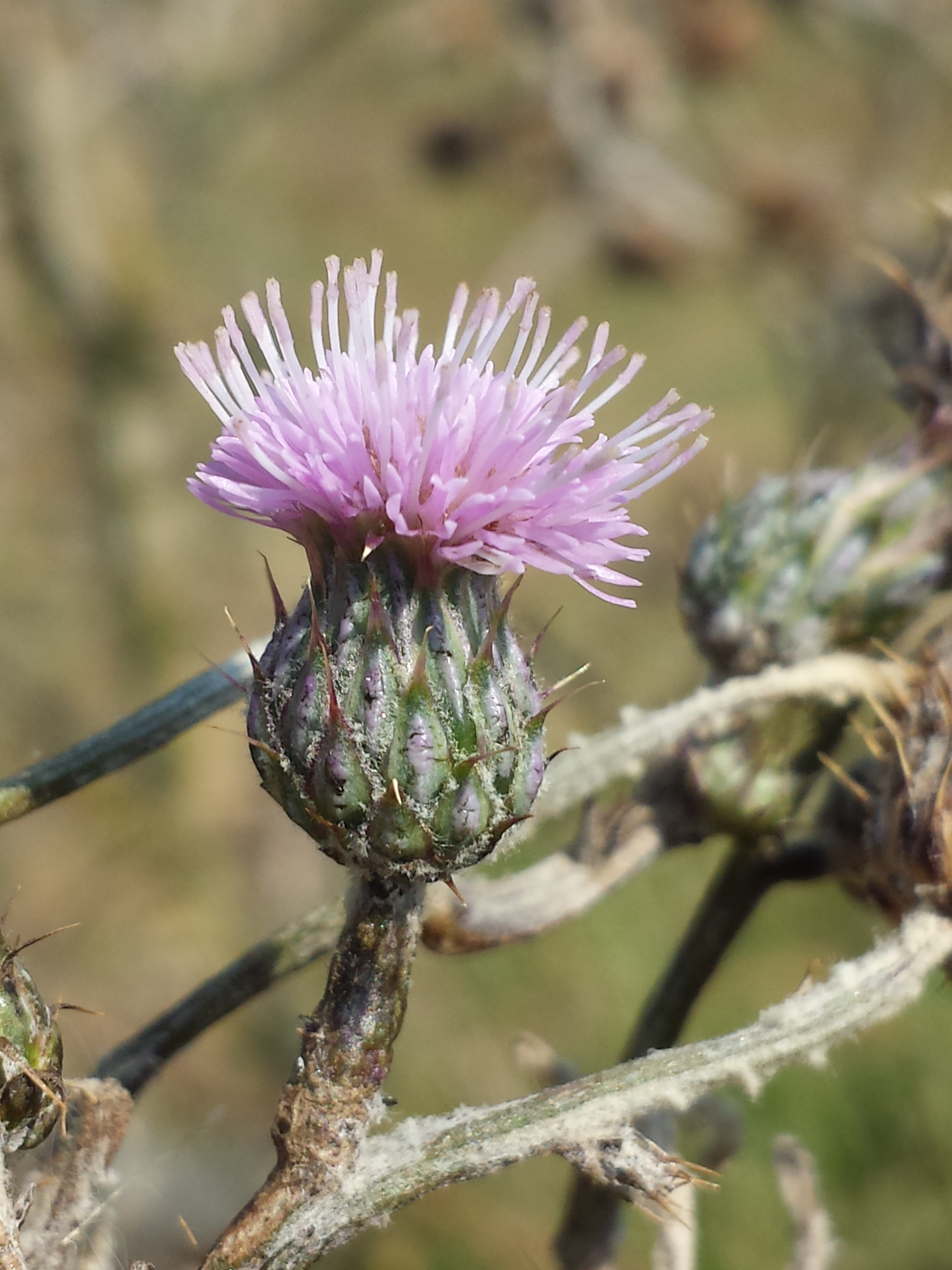

Scientific classification
- Kingdom: Plantae
- Clade: Tracheophytes
- Clade: Angiosperms
- Clade: Eudicots
- Clade: Asterids
- Order: Asterales
- Family: Asteraceae
- Genus: Cirsium
- Species: C. brachycephalum

Binomial name
- Cirsium brachycephalum Juratzka

= Cirsium brachycephalum =

Species of thistle

Cirsium brachycephalum is a species of flowering plant belonging to the family Asteraceae.

Its native range is Eastern Central and Southeastern Europe.
