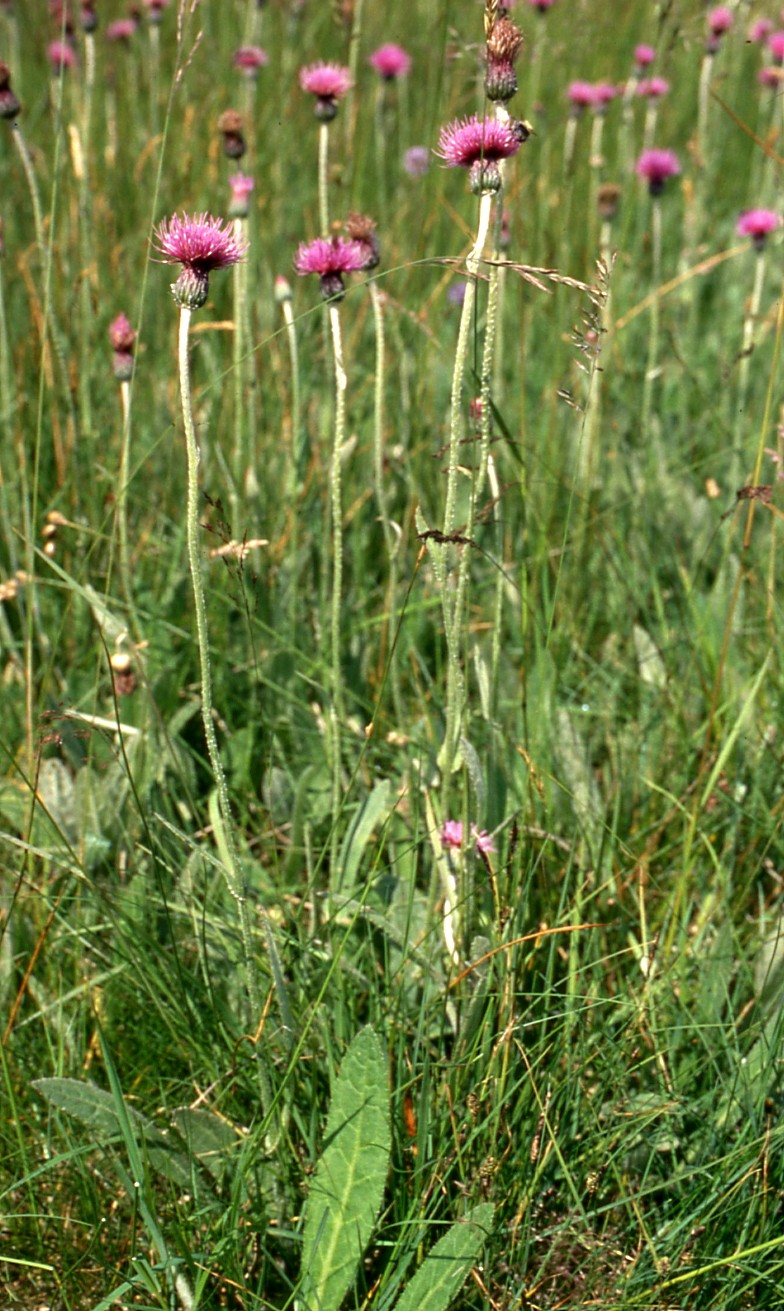

Scientific classification
- Kingdom: Plantae
- Clade: Tracheophytes
- Clade: Angiosperms
- Clade: Eudicots
- Clade: Asterids
- Order: Asterales
- Family: Asteraceae
- Genus: Cirsium
- Species: C. dissectum

Binomial name
- Cirsium dissectum (L.) Hill (1768)

Synonyms
- Synonymy: Carduus anglicus Lam. (1785); Carduus cirsium Mill. (1768); Carduus dissectus L. (1753); Carduus pratensis Huds. (1778); Carduus semipinnatus Desf. ex Steud. (1821); Carduus tuberosus Vill. (1788), nom. illeg.; Cirsium anglicum (Lam.) DC. (1805); Cirsium britannicum Scop. (1769); Cirsium bulbosum subsp. anglicum (Lam.) Bonnier & Layens (1894); Cirsium lanceolatum Hill (1769); Cirsium pratense Druce (1917); Cirsium spurium Delastre (1842); Cirsium tuberosum subsp. anglicum (Lam.) Braun-Blanq.; Cirsium tuberosum subsp. anglicum P.Fourn. (1940); Cirsium tuberosum proles anglicum (Lam.) Rouy (1905); Cnicus anglicus (Lam.) C.C.Gmel. (1808); Cnicus britannicus Druce (1906); Cnicus dentatus Willd. (1803); Cnicus dissectus (L.) Willd. 1665 (1803); Cnicus pratensis (Huds.) Willd. (1803); Cnicus spurius Hoffm. (1804)

= Cirsium dissectum =

Species of thistle

Cirsium dissectum, also known as meadow thistle, is an erect perennial herb. It is found in Great Britain, Ireland, France, the Netherlands, Germany, Italy, Spain, Hungary, Norway, etc. It is found in fens and less acidic peat bogs i.e. it prefers damp boggy areas.

== Description ==
Cirsium dissectum grows 15 to 50 cm tall. It resembles a more slender version of Cirsium heterophyllum in having a grooved cottony stem and lanceolate shaped leaves, that have prickles and not spines. However the leaves are narrower (under 3 cm), less hairy underneath, and hairy on top.

The flower heads are 2 to 3 cm long, the florets being dark red/purple, flowering from June until August.

The plant has runners.

== Similar species ==
Cirsium tuberosum or tuberous thistle, has tuberous roots rather than runners, and the leaves are twice pinnated. It is found in calcareous grasslands but very rare. It has been recorded in Britain in the counties of Cambridgeshire, Glamorgan, and Wiltshire.

It flowers from June until July.
