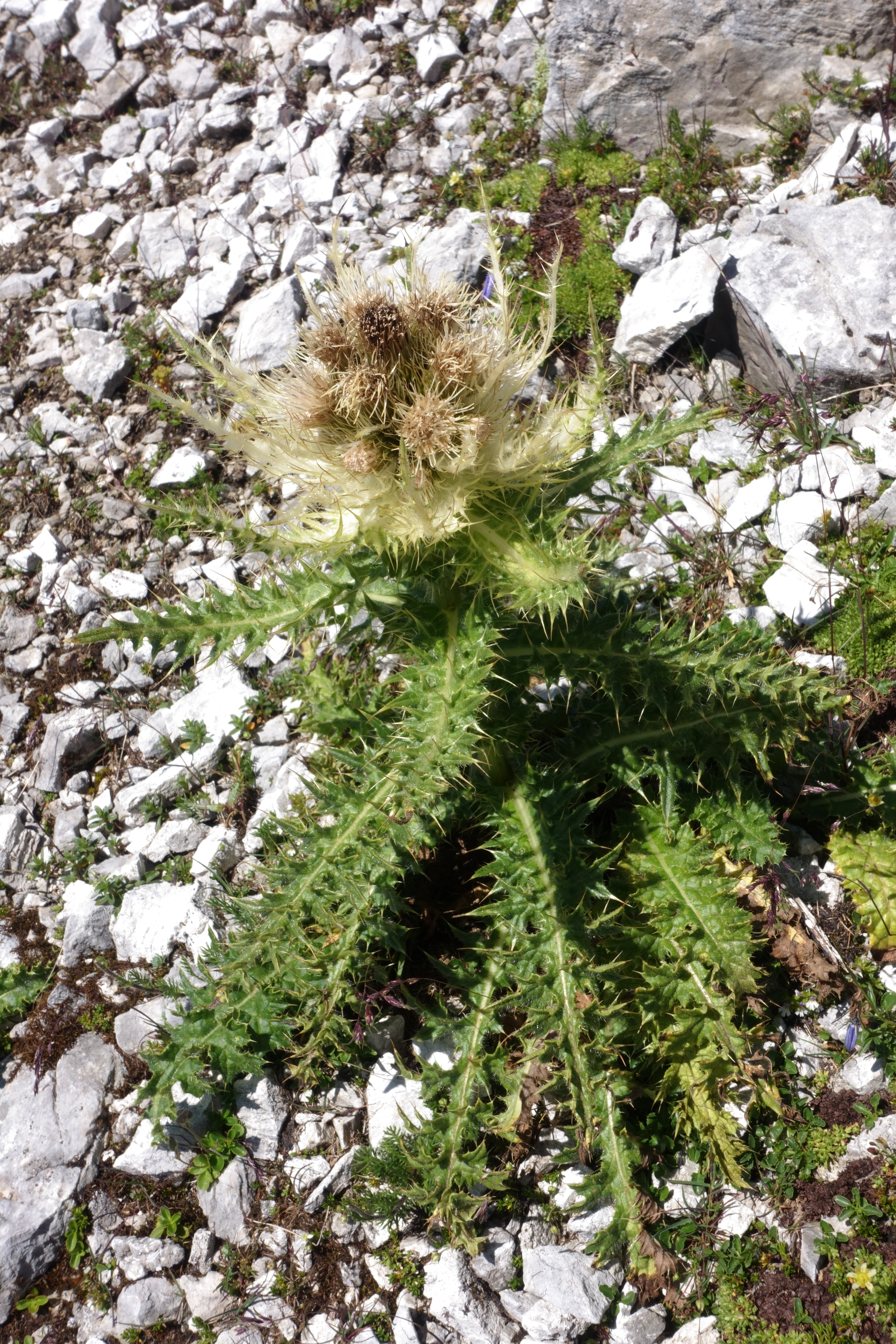

Scientific classification
- Kingdom: Plantae
- Clade: Embryophytes
- Clade: Tracheophytes
- Clade: Angiosperms
- Clade: Eudicots
- Clade: Asterids
- Order: Asterales
- Family: Asteraceae
- Genus: Cirsium
- Species: C. spinosissimum

Binomial name
- Cirsium spinosissimum (L.) Scop. 1769

Synonyms
- Synonymy: Carduus comosus Lam.; Carduus spinosissimus Vill.; Carthamus involucratus Lam.; Cirsium caput-medusae Schur ex Nyman; Cirsium cervini W.D.J.Koch; Cirsium controversum DC.; Cirsium hallerianum Gaudin; Cirsium purpureum All.; Cirsium spitzelii Sch.Bip. ex Nyman; Cnicus purpureus Bertol.; Cnicus spinosissimus L.

= Cirsium spinosissimum =

Species of thistle

Cirsium spinosissimum, common name spiniest thistle, is a European species of thistle which grows in dry rocky areas. It is found in France, Italy, Germany, Switzerland, Austria, and the Balkans.

The plant is between 20 and 80 cm (8 and 31.5 in) tall. Leaves, stems, and the sides of the flower head bear long, sharp spines, hence the name of the plant. Flower heads contain numerous disc florets but no ray florets, the florets off-white sometimes with a purple tinge.
