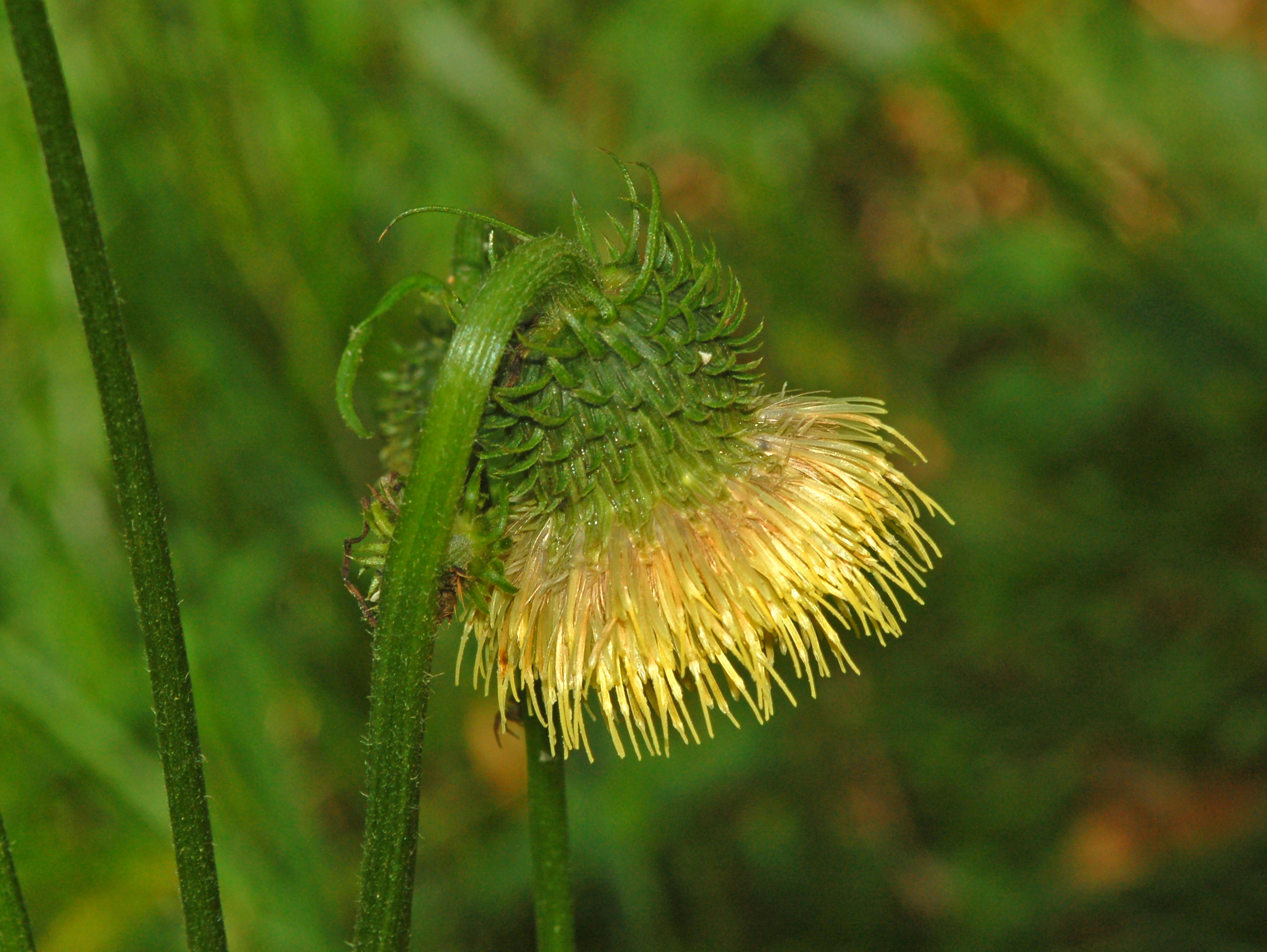
- Flowerhead of Cirsium erisithales
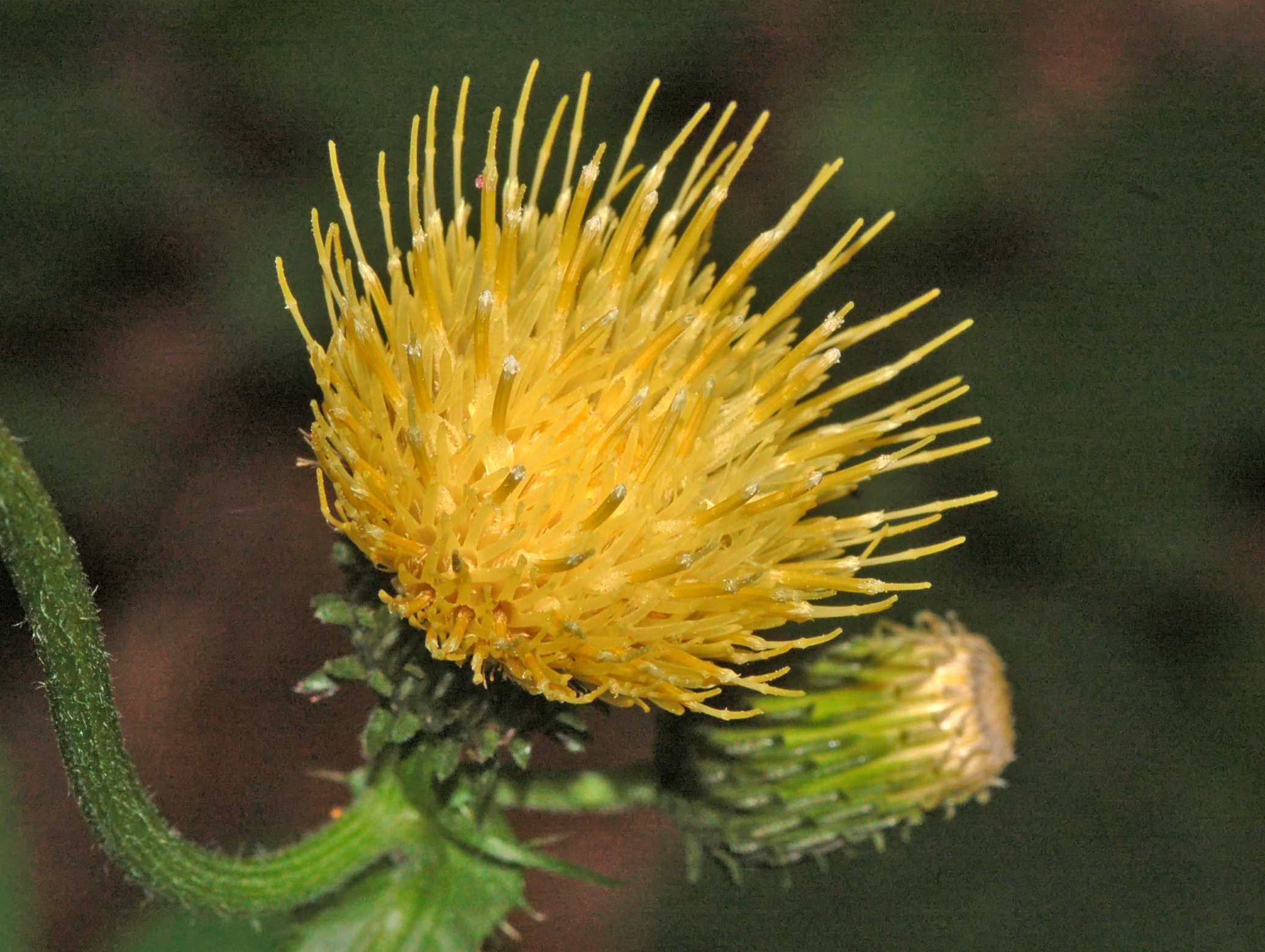
- Close-up on a flowerhead

Scientific classification
- Kingdom: Plantae
- Clade: Tracheophytes
- Clade: Angiosperms
- Clade: Eudicots
- Clade: Asterids
- Order: Asterales
- Family: Asteraceae
- Genus: Cirsium
- Species: C. erisithales

Binomial name
- Cirsium erisithales (Jacq.) Scop.

Synonyms
- Carduus erisithales Jacq.; Carduus hybridus Steud.; Cirsium glutinosum Lam. (1779); Cirsium ochroleucum DC. in Lam. & DC. (1805); Cirsium scopolianum Sch.Bip. ex Nyman; Cnicus divaricatus Kit. ex Jáv. (1926); Cnicus ochroleucus (All.) Schleich.

= Cirsium erisithales =

Species of thistle

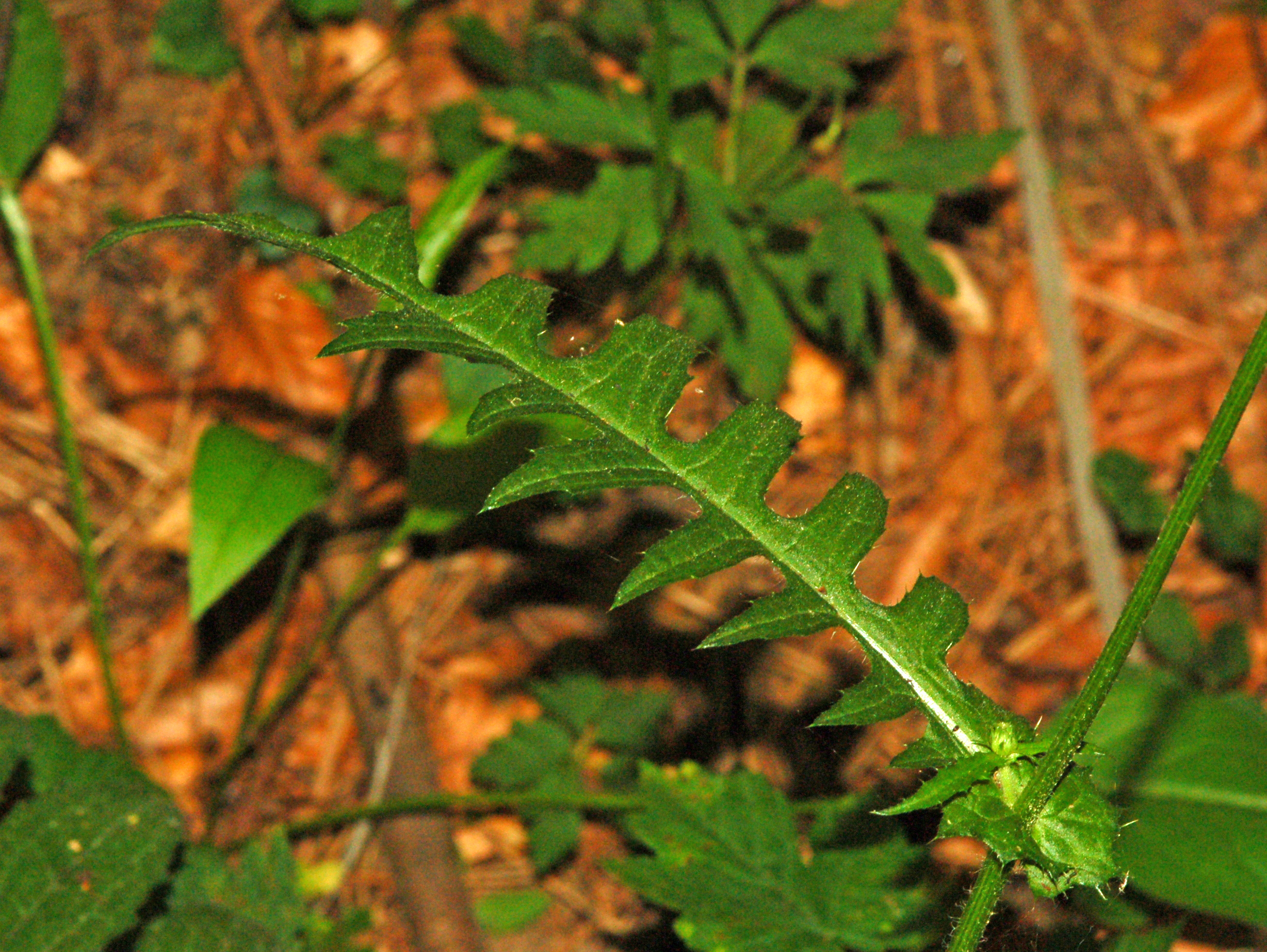
Leaf of Cirsium erisithales

Cirsium erisithales, the yellow thistle or yellow melancholy thistle, is a perennial herbaceous plant in the tribe Cardueae within the family Asteraceae.

== Description ==
Cirsium erisithales can reach a height of 50–150 centimetres (20–59 in). The stems are erect, almost hairless. This plant has just a few leaves, with tooth-shaped lobes. Flower heads are lemon yellow, solitary or in groups (up to 5), with a diameter of 25–30 millimetres (0.98–1.18 in).

== Distribution ==
This species is widespread in southern and eastern Europe, though nowhere very common. It is present in the mountains of France, Italy, Switzerland, Austria, Poland, Ukraine, the Balkans, Greece, southern Russia, etc.

== Habitat ==
Cirsium erisithales grows in fresh wood (beech), rocky slopes, meadows and waters edge. It prefers calcareous or volcanic soils, at an elevation of 400–2,000 metres (1,300–6,600 ft) above sea level.
