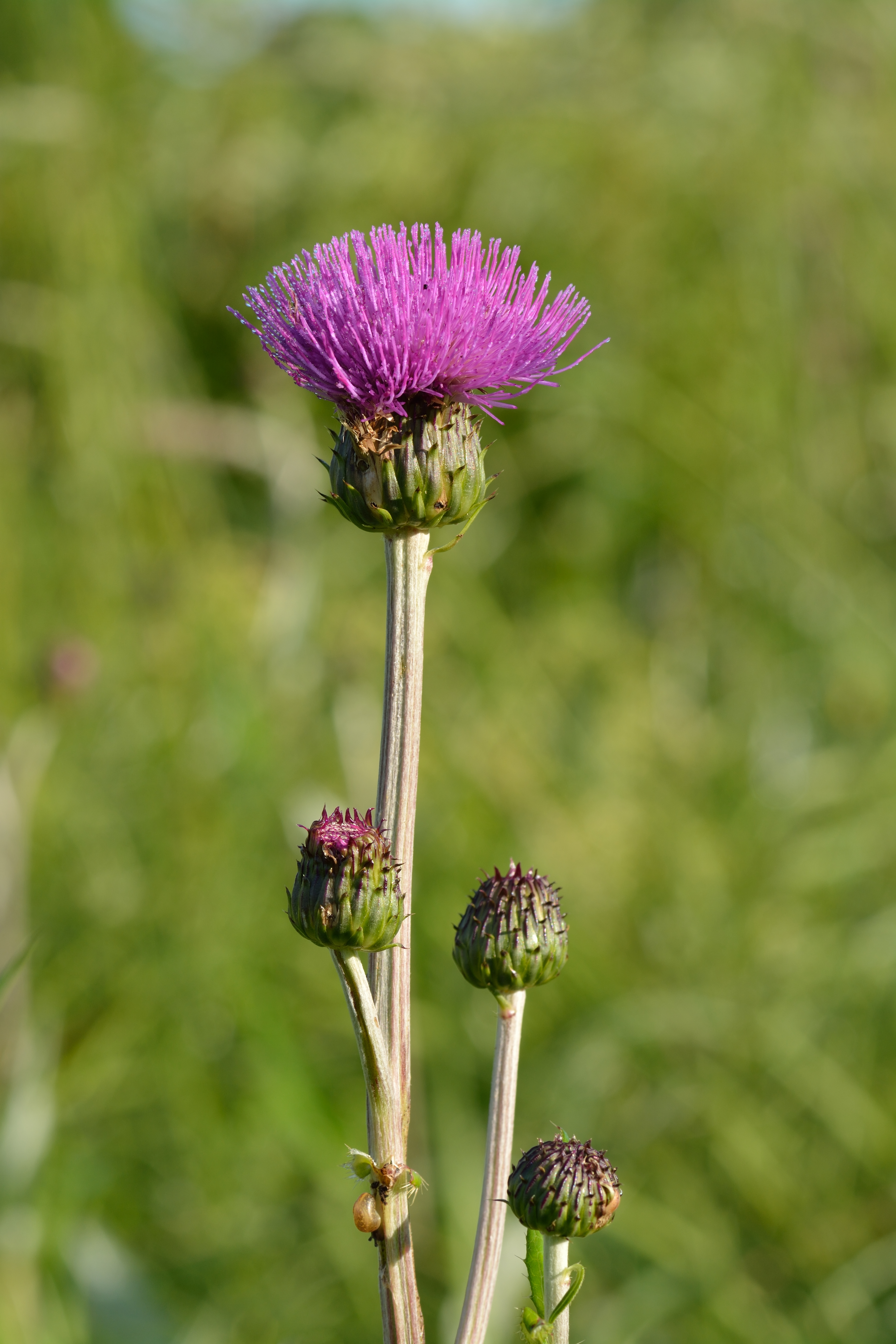

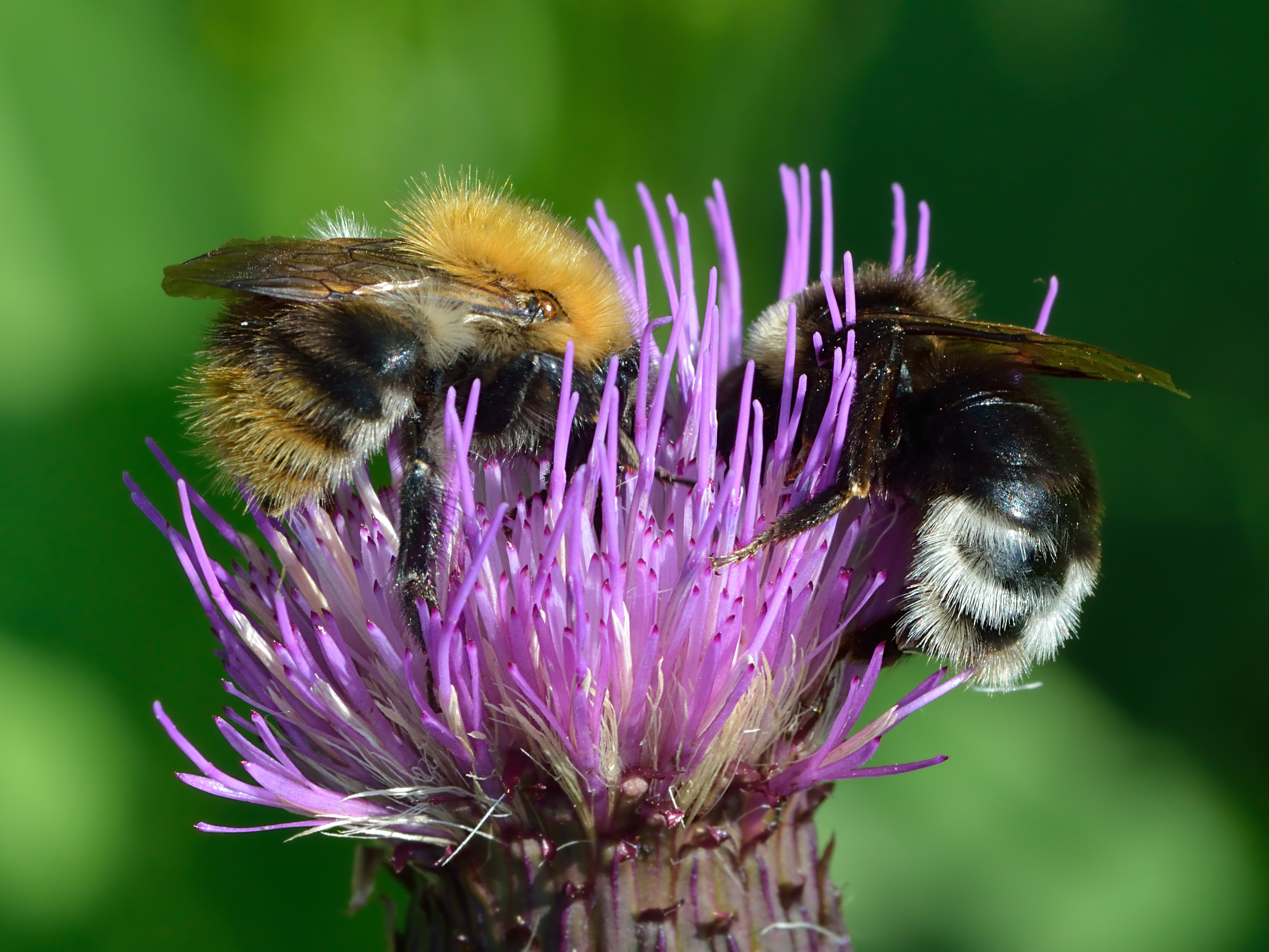

Scientific classification
- Kingdom: Plantae
- Clade: Tracheophytes
- Clade: Angiosperms
- Clade: Eudicots
- Clade: Asterids
- Order: Asterales
- Family: Asteraceae
- Genus: Cirsium
- Species: C. heterophyllum

Binomial name
- Cirsium heterophyllum (L.) Hill

Synonyms
- Synonymy: Carduus ambiguus Pers.; Carduus autareticus Vill.; Carduus helenifolius Salisb.; Carduus heterophyllus L.; Carduus polymorphus Lapeyr.; Cirsium autareticum Mutel; Cirsium carolorum C.Jenner ex Nyman; Cirsium hastatum (Lam.) Thell. ex Schinz; Cirsium pauciflorum W.D.J.Koch; Cnicus ambiguus Loisel.; Cnicus heterophyllus (L.) Retz.; Cynara diversifolia Stokes

= Cirsium heterophyllum =

Species of thistle

Cirsium heterophyllum, the melancholy thistle, is an erect spineless herbaceous perennial flowering plant in the family Asteraceae. It is native to Europe and western Asia, where it grows in upland meadows, grasslands, road verges and open woodland.

== Description ==
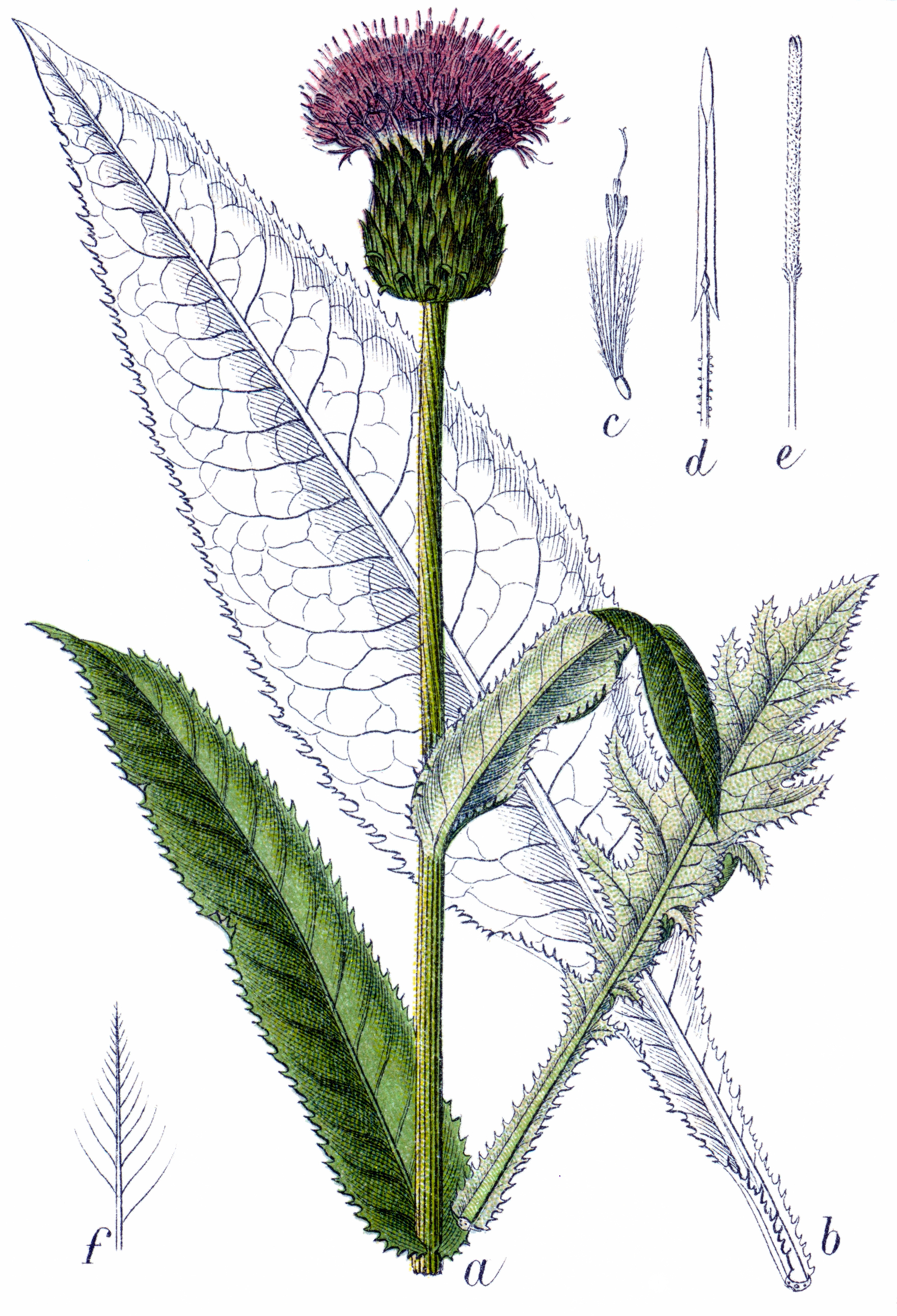
Illustration

Unusually for a thistle, Cirsium heterophyllum lacks spines. Growing 45–120 cm (18–47 in) tall, the plant forms creeping stolons (runners). The stem is grooved but unwinged, more-or-less branchless, and cottony. The leaves are green and hairless above, thick white-felted underneath. The basal leaves are lanceolate with petioles and softly prickly edges, and grow 20–40 cm (7.9–15.7 in) long, and 4–8 cm (1.6–3.1 in) wide. The upper leaves do not have petioles, clasping the stem with cordate (heart-shaped) bases. The flower heads are 3 to 5 cm long and wide, the flowers red-purple, appearing from July to August.

== Distribution ==
Cirsium heterophyllum is a species of northern Europe and Central Asia. It is native in upland areas of Scotland and northern England and north Wales, but is rare in other parts of Great Britain and Ireland. It is present throughout Scandinavia, in north central Europe and Russia to about 100 degrees East and in the high mountains of southern Europe. It grows in upland grassland and scrub, open woodland and river valleys.

== Similar species ==
Cirsium dissectum (meadow thistle) is a more slender species.

== Medical use ==
The plant was considered a possible cure for sadness. Nicholas Culpepper in 1669 said that it "makes a man as merry as a cricket".
