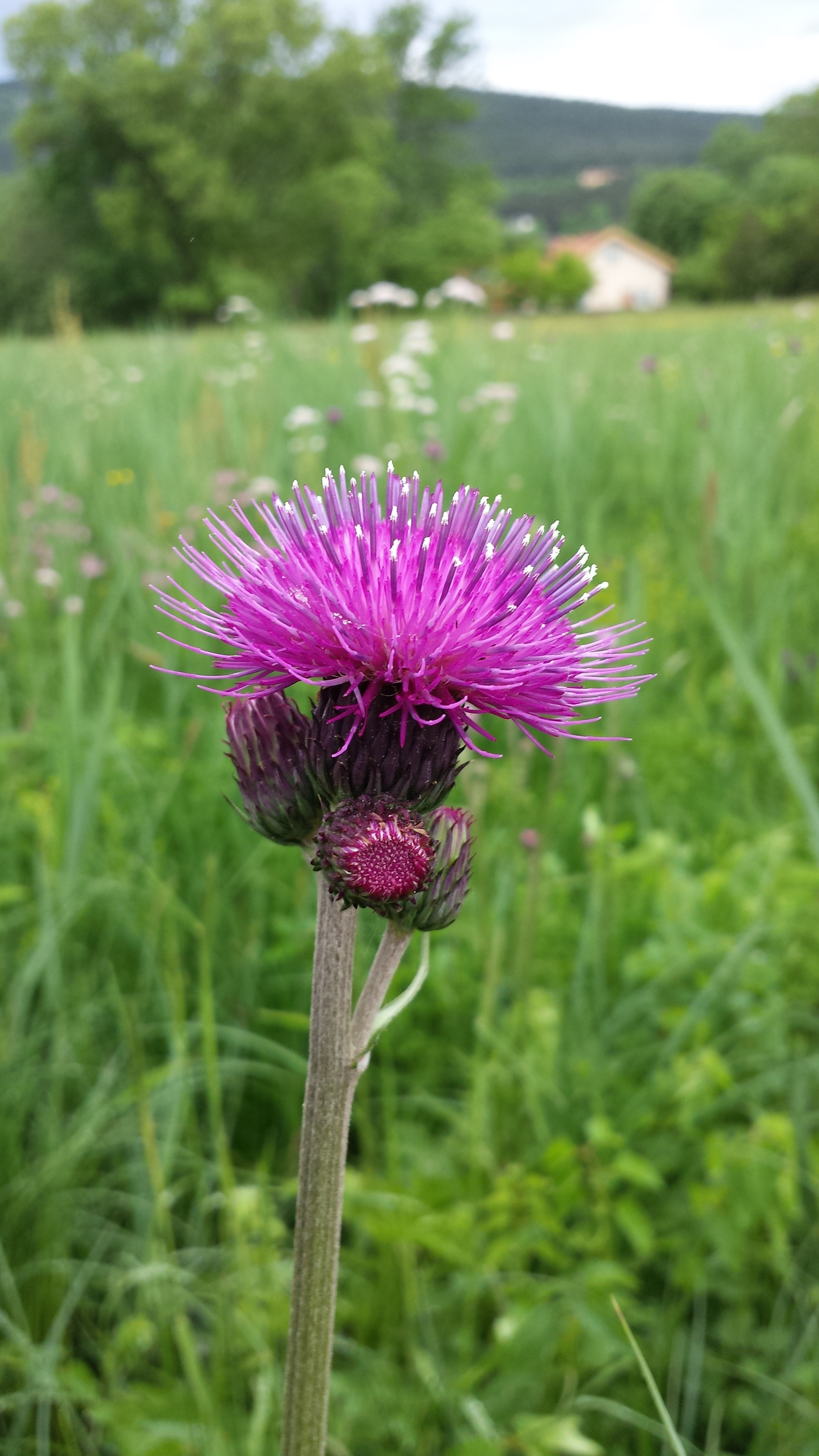

Scientific classification
- Kingdom: Plantae
- Clade: Embryophytes
- Clade: Tracheophytes
- Clade: Spermatophytes
- Clade: Angiosperms
- Clade: Eudicots
- Clade: Asterids
- Order: Asterales
- Family: Asteraceae
- Genus: Cirsium
- Species: C. rivulare

Binomial name
- Cirsium rivulare (Jacq.) All.

= Cirsium rivulare =

Species of thistle

Cirsium rivulare is a species of flowering plant in the family Asteraceae, native to eastern and western Europe, adventive in Britain, and naturalised in Sweden and Belgium.

Growing to 1.5 m (4.9 ft) tall, this erect herbaceous perennial is a clump-forming thistle, with narrow grey-green prickly leaves and small purple globular flowerheads in early to midsummer.

The Latin specific epithet rivulare means "brook loving". The plant prefers moist conditions but can tolerate some dryness.

The cultivar Cirsium rivulare 'Atropurpureum', with deep crimson flowers, has received the Royal Horticultural Society's Award of Garden Merit. It is very hardy down to at least −20 °C (−4 °F) (RHS rating H7), and thrives in full sun.

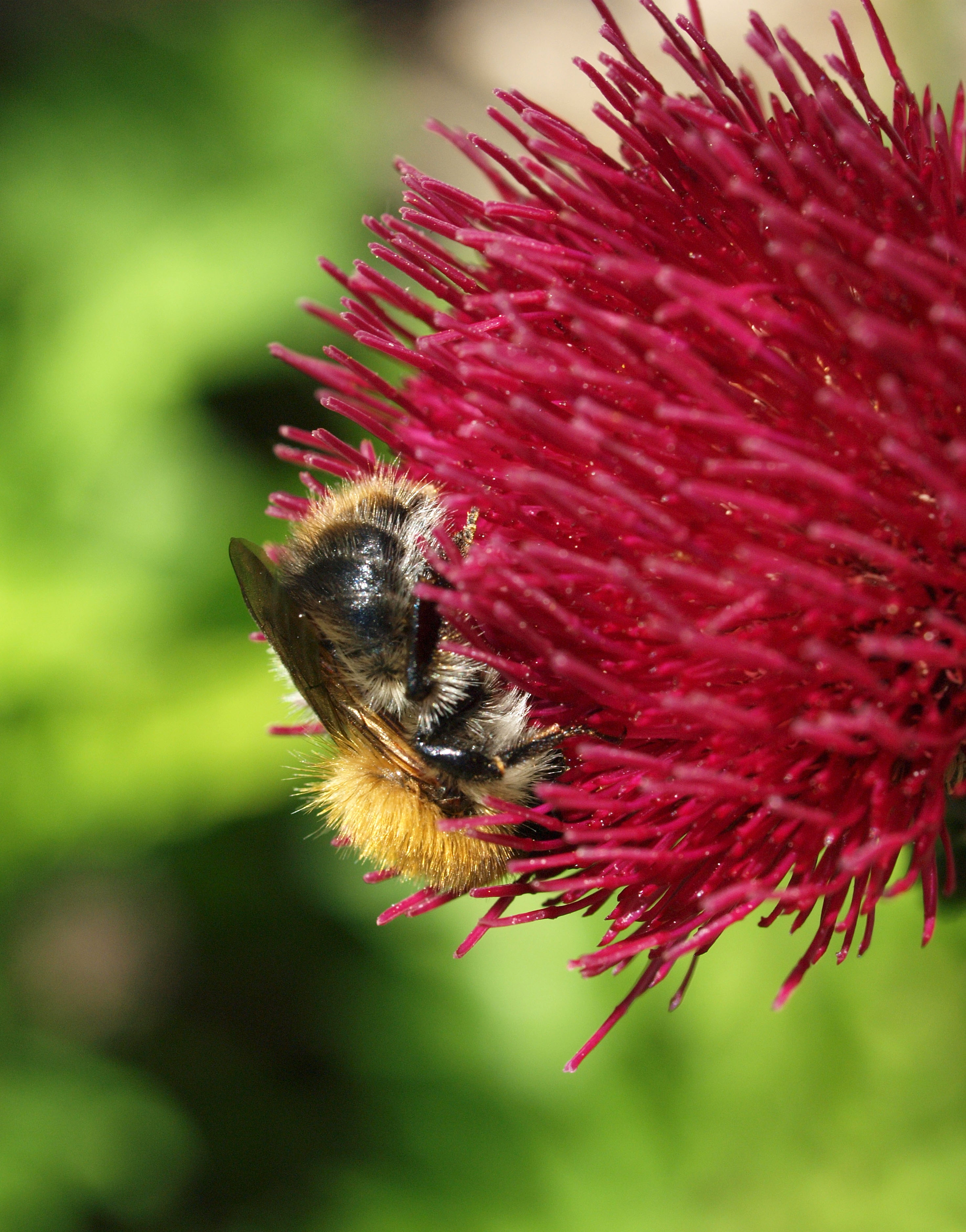
Bee on 'Atropurpureum' flower

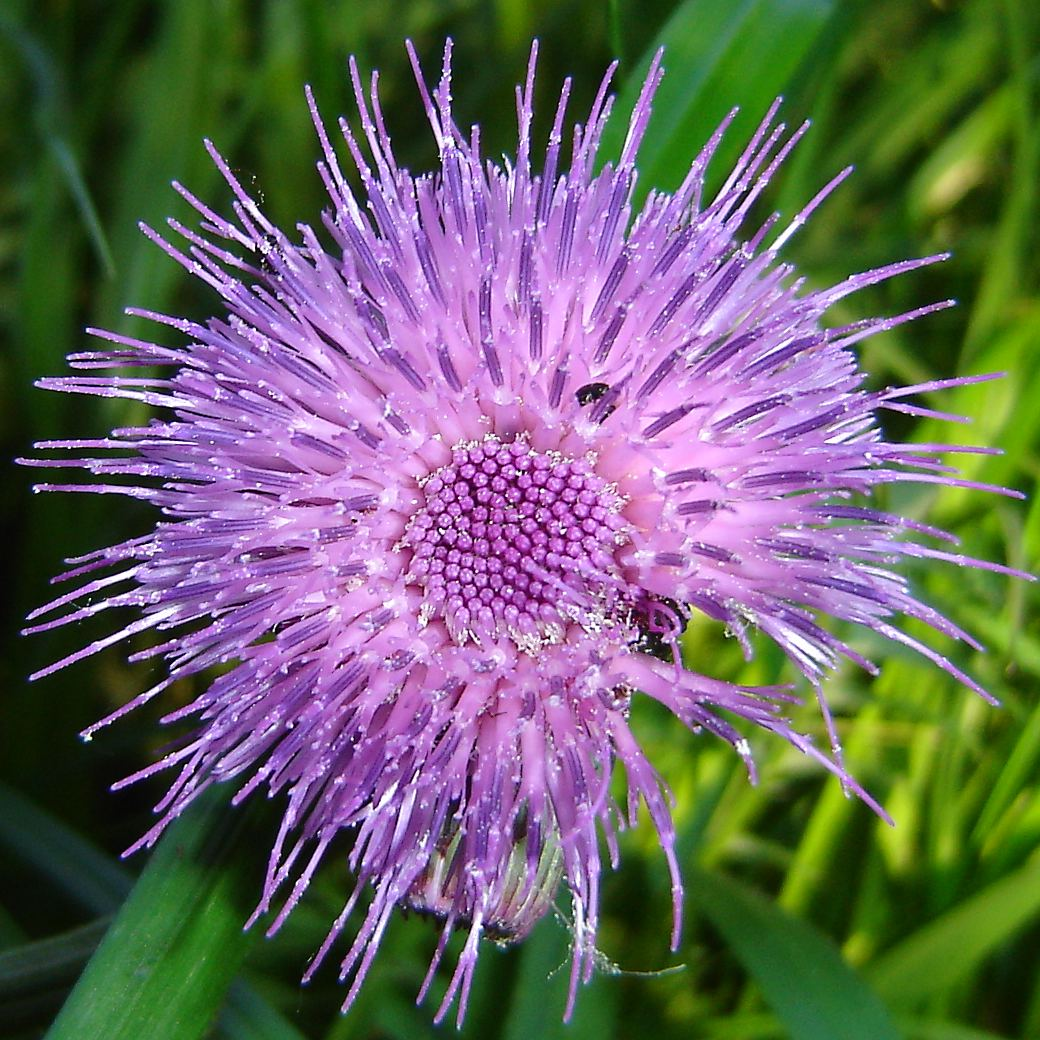
