= Perchau am Sattel =

- Former municipality
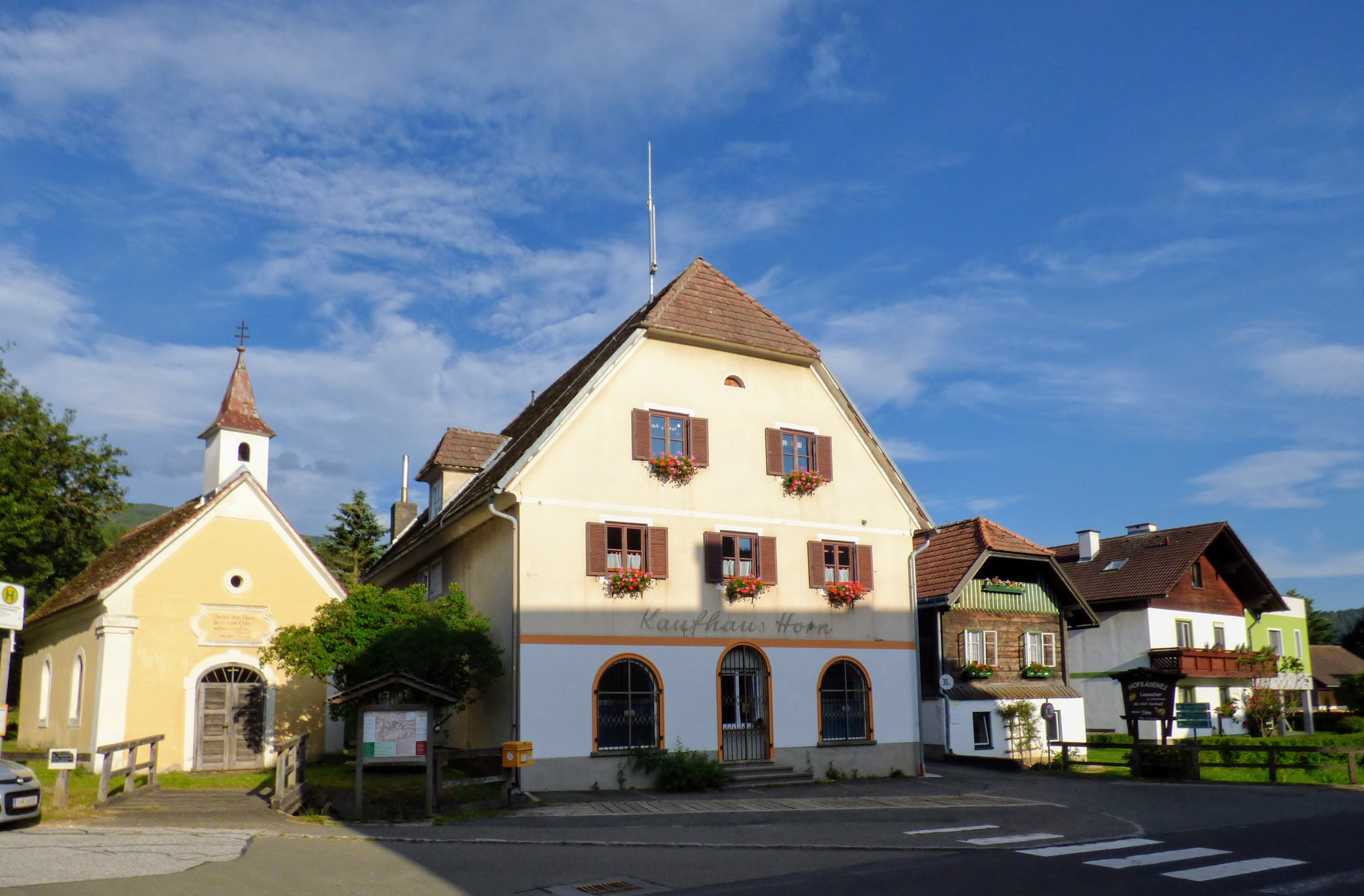
- Village centre

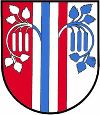
- Coat of arms

- Location within Austria
- Coordinates: 47°06′30″N 14°27′26″E
- Country: Austria
- State: Styria
- District: Murau

Area
  - Total: 19.39 km^{2} (7.49 sq mi)
- Elevation: 1,005 m (3,297 ft)

Population (1 January 2016)
  - Total: 301
  - Density: 15.5/km^{2} (40.2/sq mi)
- Time zone: UTC+1 (CET)
  - Summer (DST): UTC+2 (CEST)
- Postal code: 8820
- Area code: 03584
- Vehicle registration: MU
- Website: www.perchau-sattel.steiermark.at

Perchau am Sattel is a former municipality in the district of Murau in the Austrian state of Styria. Since the 2015 Styria municipal structural reform, it is part of the municipality Neumarkt in der Steiermark.

== Geography ==
Perchau lies about 22 km east of Murau.
