= Sankt Lorenzen bei Scheifling =

- Former municipality
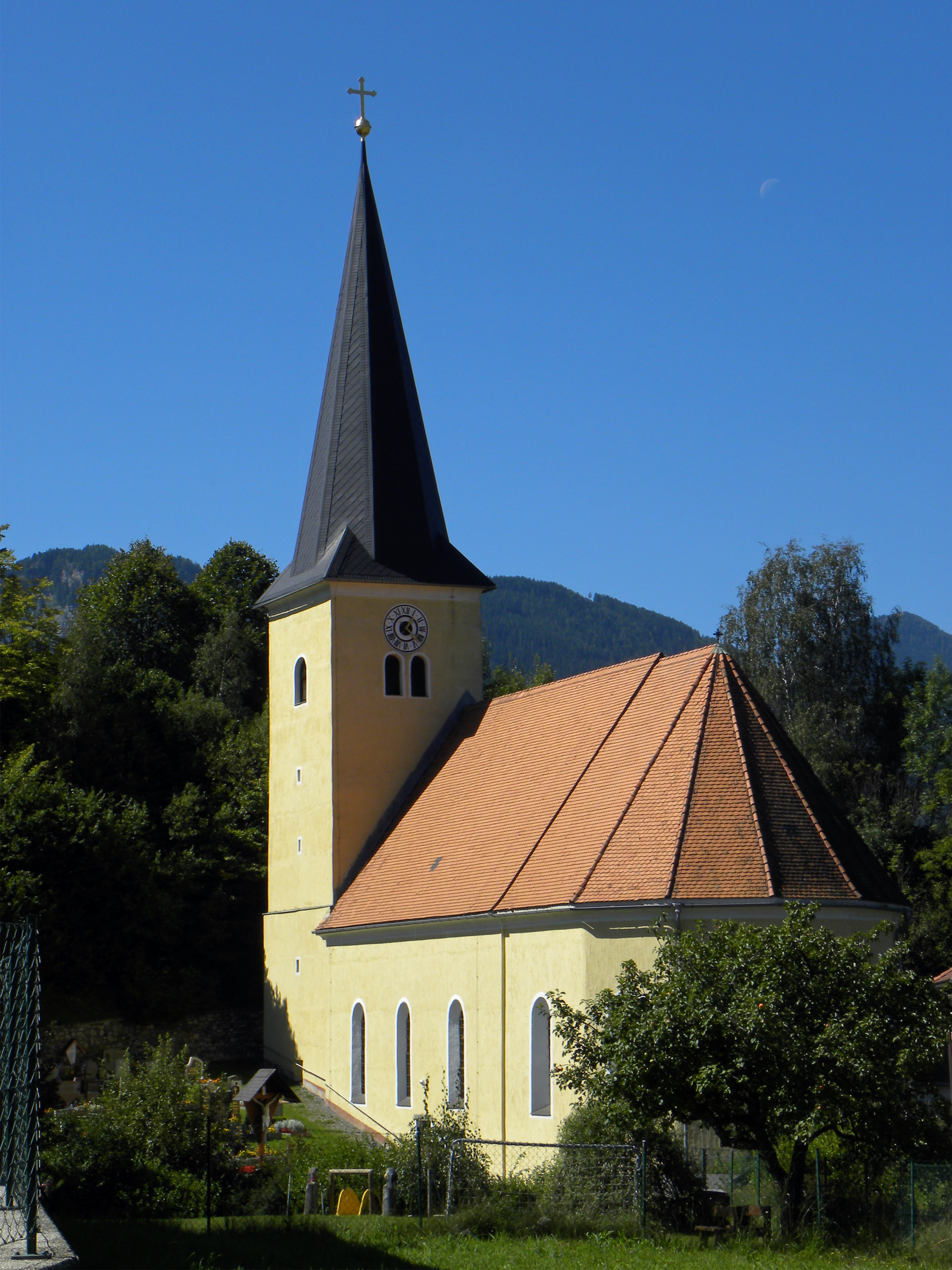
- Sankt Lorenzen bei Scheifling parish church

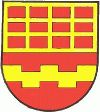
- Coat of arms

- Location within Austria
- Coordinates: 47°08′44″N 14°24′21″E
- Country: Austria
- State: Styria
- District: Murau

Area
  - Total: 41.99 km^{2} (16.21 sq mi)
- Elevation: 795 m (2,608 ft)

Population (1 January 2016)
  - Total: 634
  - Density: 15.1/km^{2} (39.1/sq mi)
- Time zone: UTC+1 (CET)
  - Summer (DST): UTC+2 (CEST)
- Postal code: 8811, 8820
- Area code: 03582
- Vehicle registration: MU
- Website: www.st-lorenzen-scheifling.steiermark.at

Sankt Lorenzen bei Scheifling is a former municipality in the district of Murau in Styria, Austria. Since the 2015 Styria municipal structural reform, it is part of the municipality Scheifling.

== Geography ==
The municipality lies about 18 km east of Murau.
