= Dürnstein in der Steiermark =

- Former municipality
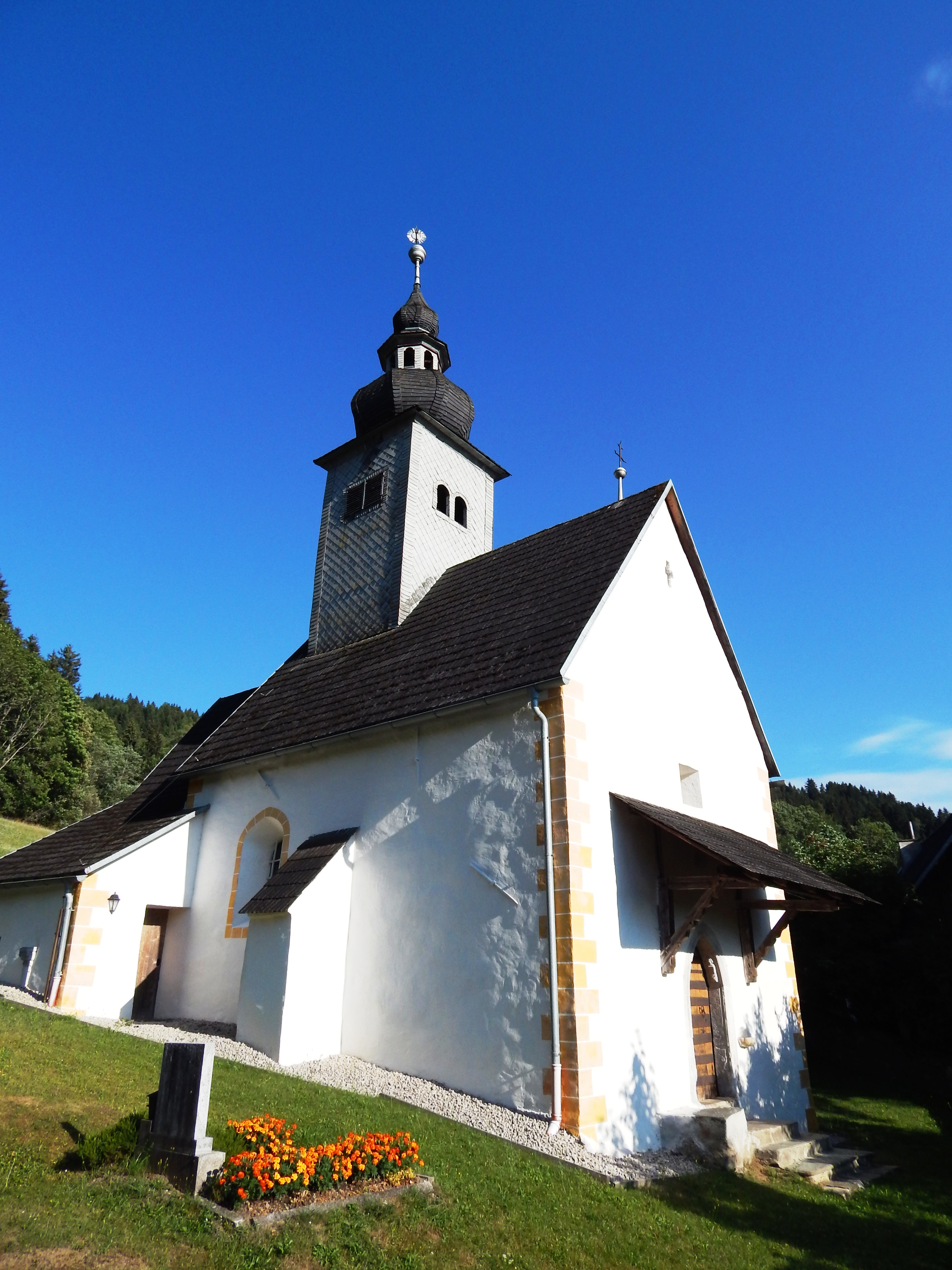
- Catholic church in Dürnstein

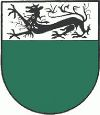
- Coat of arms

- Location within Austria
- Coordinates: 46°59′18″N 14°23′20″E
- Country: Austria
- State: Styria
- District: Murau

Area
  - Total: 14.21 km^{2} (5.49 sq mi)
- Elevation: 676 m (2,218 ft)

Population (1 January 2016)
  - Total: 278
  - Density: 19.6/km^{2} (50.7/sq mi)
- Time zone: UTC+1 (CET)
  - Summer (DST): UTC+2 (CEST)
- Postal code: 9323
- Area code: 04268
- Vehicle registration: MU
- Website: www.duernstein. steiermark.at

Dürnstein in der Steiermark is a former municipality in the district of Murau in Styria, Austria. Since the 2015 Styria municipal structural reform, it is part of the municipality Neumarkt in der Steiermark.

== Geography ==
Dürnstein in der Steiermark lies about 20 km southeast of Murau and about 5 km north of Friesach.
