= Zeutschach =

- Former municipality
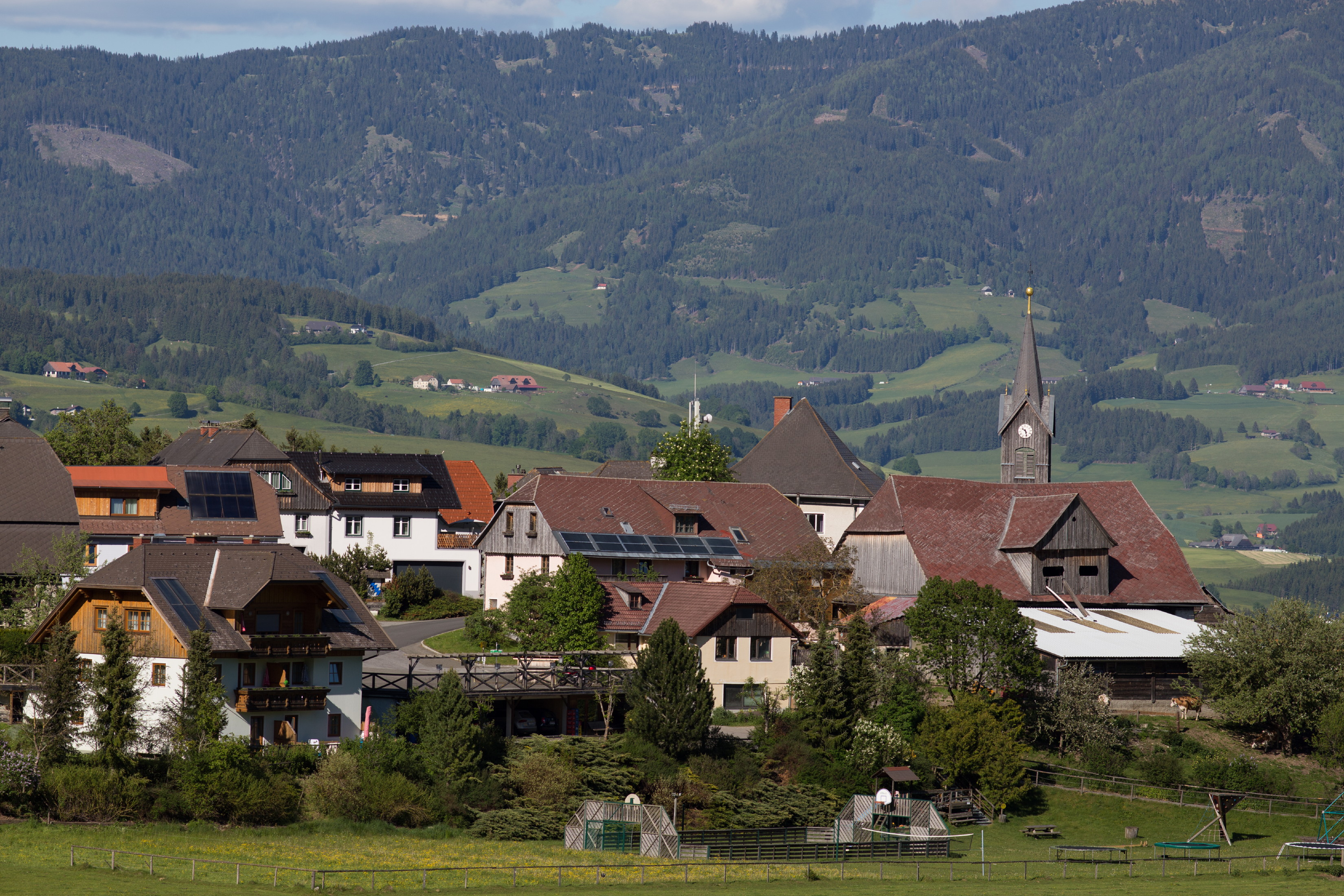
- Zeutschach

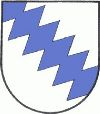
- Coat of arms

- Location within Austria
- Coordinates: 47°04′10″N 14°23′30″E
- Country: Austria
- State: Styria
- District: Murau

Area
  - Total: 18.34 km^{2} (7.08 sq mi)
- Elevation: 1,043 m (3,422 ft)

Population (1 January 2016)
  - Total: 211
  - Density: 11.5/km^{2} (29.8/sq mi)
- Time zone: UTC+1 (CET)
  - Summer (DST): UTC+2 (CEST)
- Postal code: 8820
- Area code: 03584
- Vehicle registration: MU
- Website: www.zeutschach.at

Zeutschach is a former municipality in the district of Murau in Styria, Austria. Since the 2015 Styria municipal structural reform, it is part of the municipality Neumarkt in der Steiermark.
