= Sankt Marein bei Neumarkt =

- Former municipality
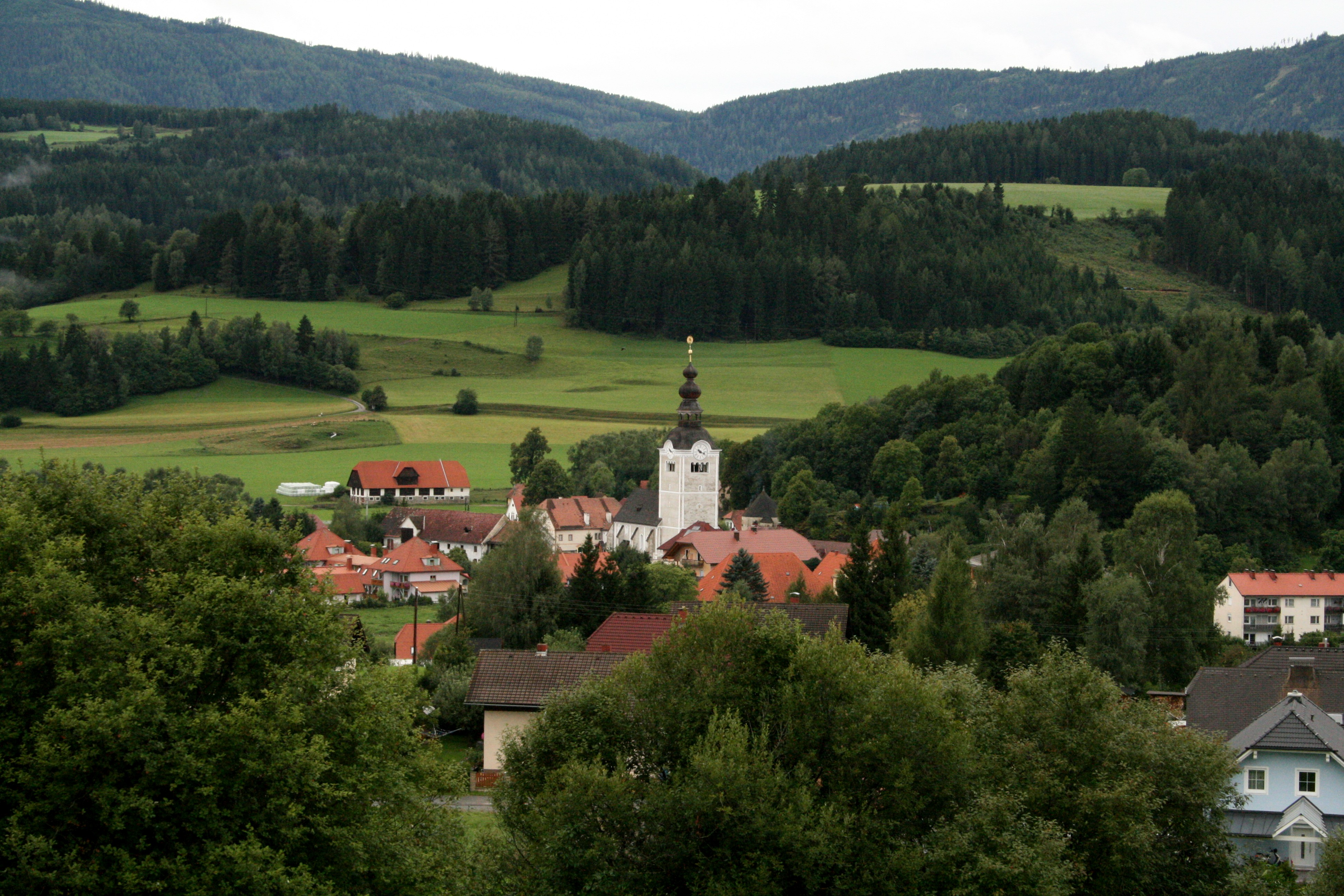
- View of Sankt Marein

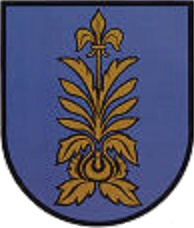
- Coat of arms

- Location within Austria
- Coordinates: 47°04′00″N 14°25′00″E
- Country: Austria
- State: Styria
- District: Murau

Area
  - Total: 54.66 km^{2} (21.10 sq mi)
- Elevation: 830 m (2,720 ft)

Population (1 January 2016)
  - Total: 932
  - Density: 17.1/km^{2} (44.2/sq mi)
- Time zone: UTC+1 (CET)
  - Summer (DST): UTC+2 (CEST)
- Postal code: 8820
- Area code: 03584
- Vehicle registration: MU
- Website: www.st-marein-neumarkt.steiermark.at

Sankt Marein bei Neumarkt is a former municipality in the district of Murau in the Austrian state of Styria. Since the 2015 Styria municipal structural reform, it is part of the municipality Neumarkt in der Steiermark.

== Geography ==
The municipality lies about 20 km southeast of Murau.
