= Sankt Marein =

Sankt Marein may refer to the following places:

Austria

- Sankt Marein bei Graz, in Styria
- Sankt Marein bei Knittelfeld, in Styria
- Sankt Marein bei Neumarkt, in Styria
- Sankt Marein im Mürztal, in Styria

Slovenia

- Šmarje pri Jelšah, in Lower Styria (in German: Sankt Marein bei Erlachstein)
