= Mariahof =

- Former municipality
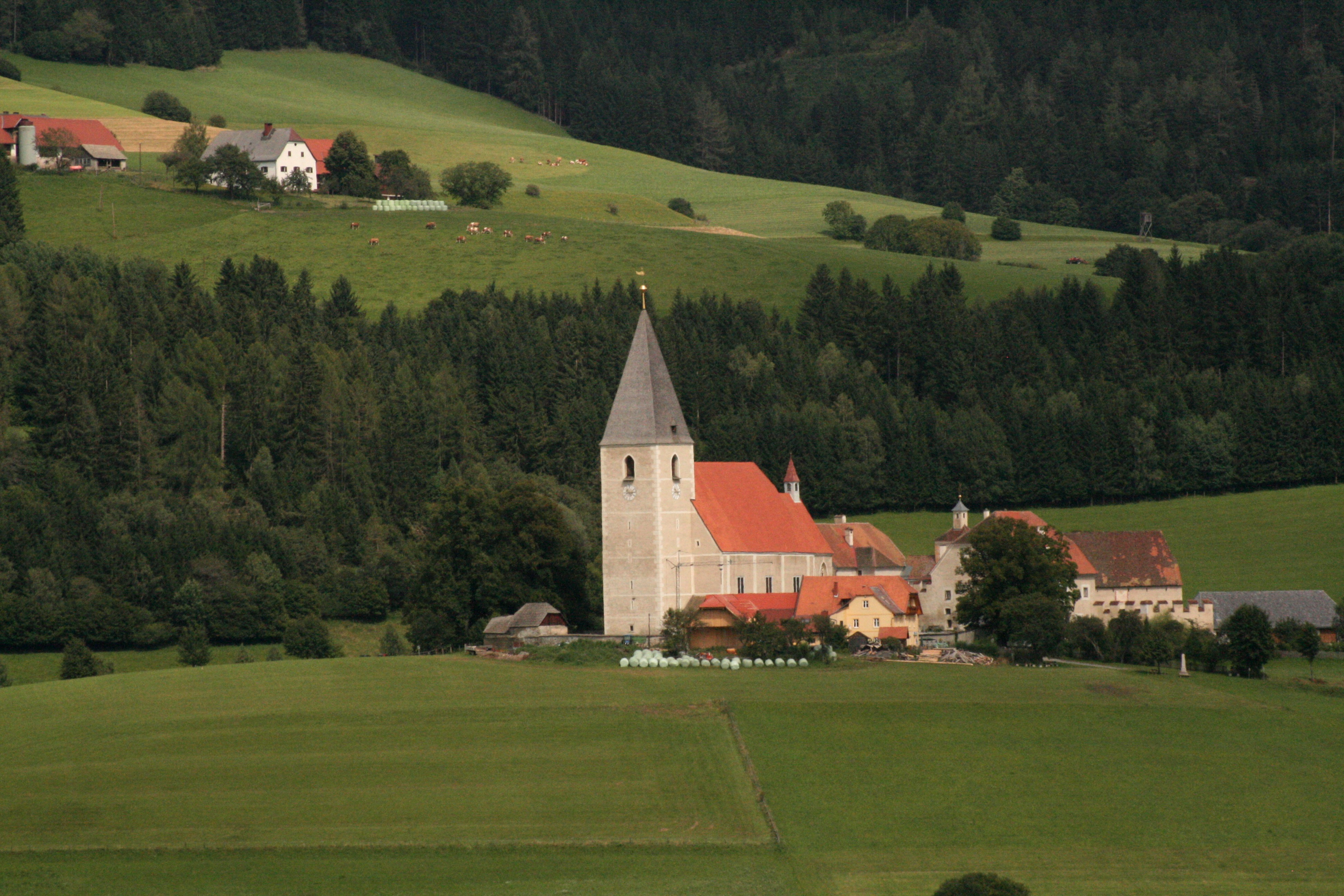
- View with parish church

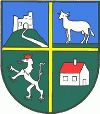
- Coat of arms

- Location within Austria
- Coordinates: 47°06′00″N 14°24′00″E
- Country: Austria
- State: Styria
- District: Murau

Area
  - Total: 32.7 km^{2} (12.6 sq mi)
- Elevation: 963 m (3,159 ft)

Population (1 January 2016)
  - Total: 1,352
  - Density: 41.3/km^{2} (107/sq mi)
- Time zone: UTC+1 (CET)
  - Summer (DST): UTC+2 (CEST)
- Postal code: 8812, 8820
- Area code: 03584
- Vehicle registration: MU
- Website: www.mariahof-steiermark.at

Mariahof is a former municipality in the district of Murau in Styria, Austria. Since the 2015 Styria municipal structural reform, it is part of the municipality Neumarkt in der Steiermark.

== Geography ==
Mariahof lies in the valley of the Mur on the pass road between the Mur valley and the Metnitz valley.
