= Kulm am Zirbitz =

- Former municipality
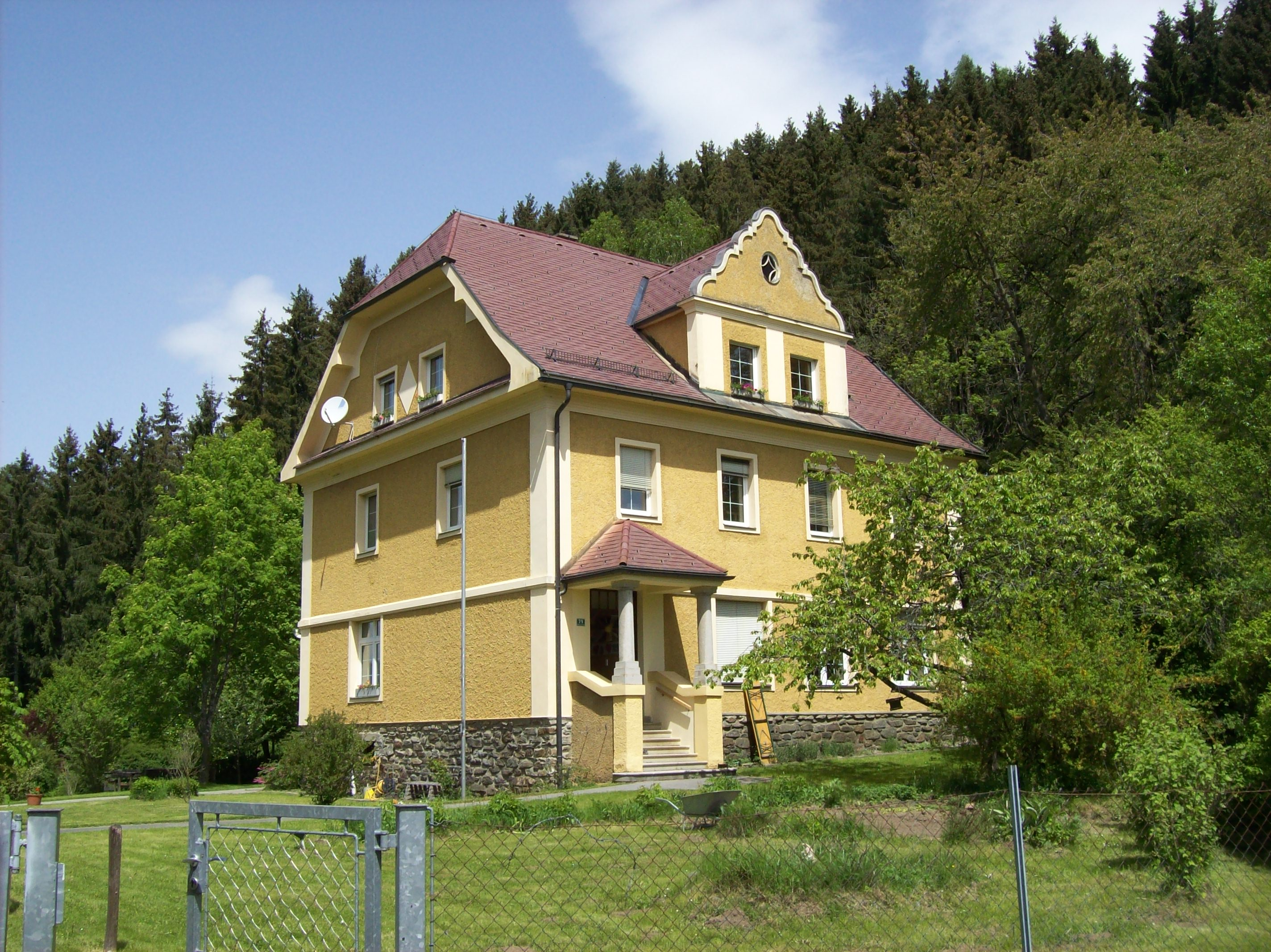
- School in Kulm

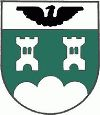
- Coat of arms

- Location within Austria
- Coordinates: 47°03′00″N 14°28′48″E
- Country: Austria
- State: Styria
- District: Murau

Area
  - Total: 18.95 km^{2} (7.32 sq mi)
- Elevation: 1,149 m (3,770 ft)

Population (1 January 2016)
  - Total: 308
  - Density: 16.3/km^{2} (42.1/sq mi)
- Time zone: UTC+1 (CET)
  - Summer (DST): UTC+2 (CEST)
- Postal code: 8820, 8813, 8850
- Area code: 03584
- Vehicle registration: MU

Kulm am Zirbitz is a former municipality in the district of Murau in Styria, Austria. Since the 2015 Styria municipal structural reform, it is part of the municipality Neumarkt in der Steiermark.
