= Mühlen =

- Municipality
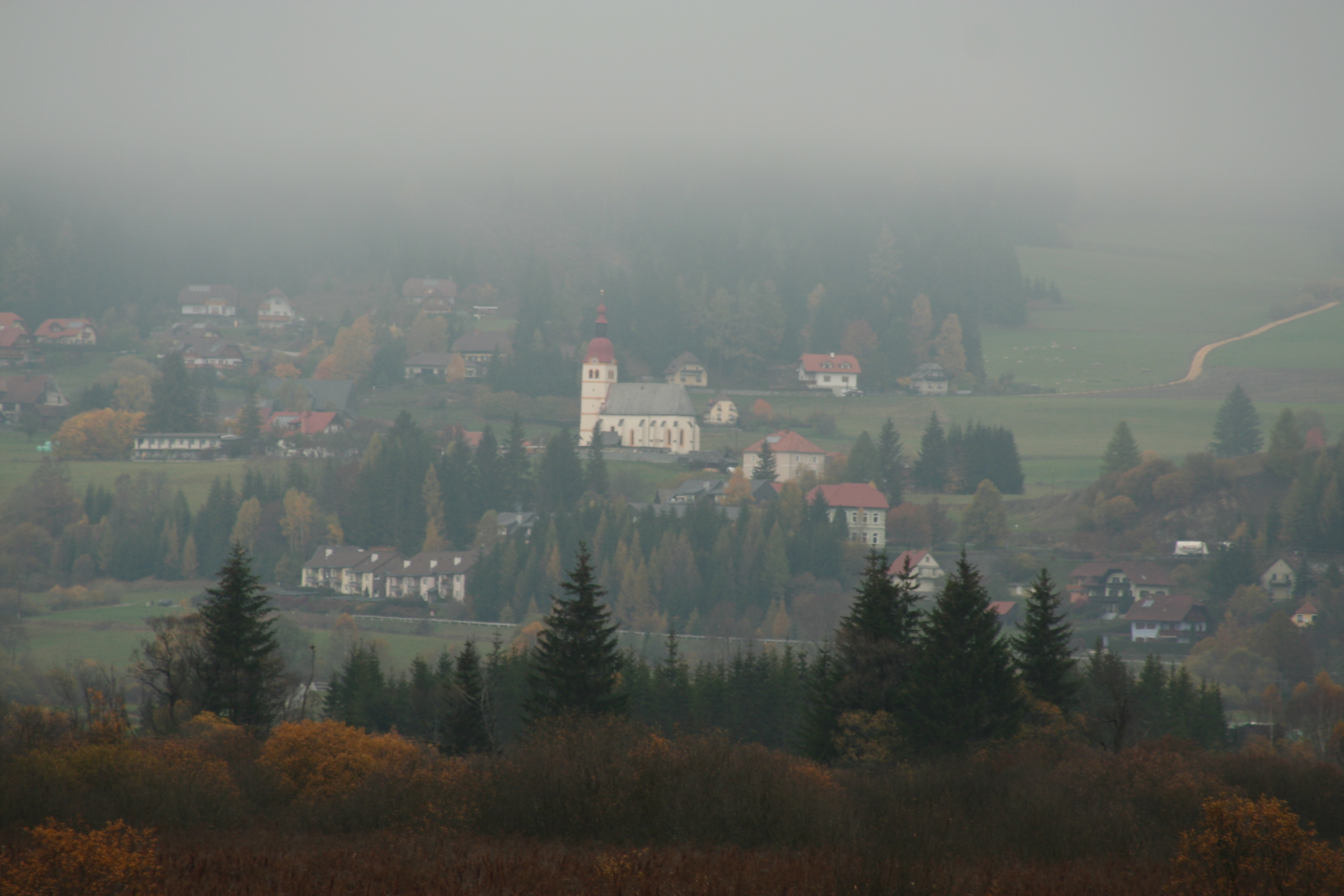

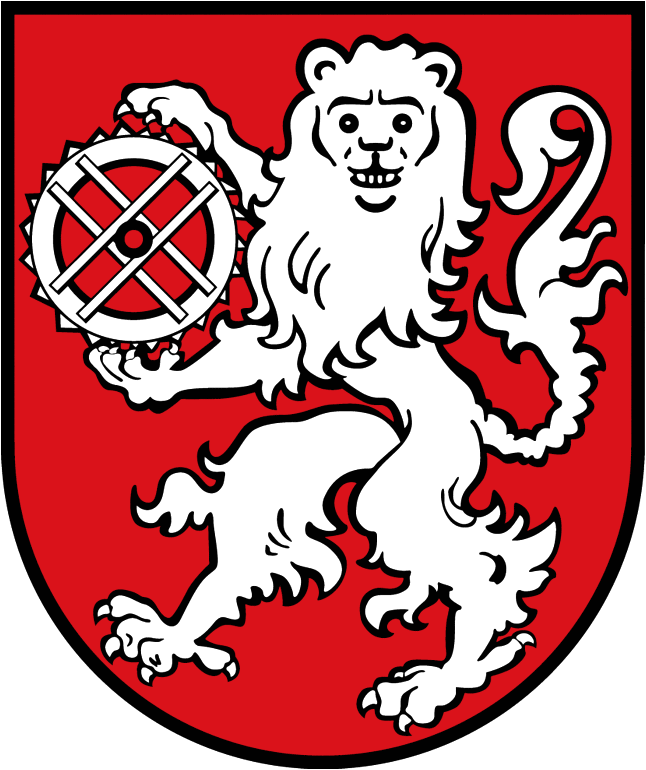
- Coat of arms

- Location within Austria
- Coordinates: 47°02′00″N 14°30′00″E
- Country: Austria
- State: Styria
- District: Murau

Government
  - Mayor: Herbert Grießer (SPÖ)

Area
  - Total: 50.77 km^{2} (19.60 sq mi)
- Elevation: 960 m (3,150 ft)

Population (2016-01-01)
  - Total: 882
  - Density: 17.4/km^{2} (45.0/sq mi)
- Time zone: UTC+1 (CET)
  - Summer (DST): UTC+2 (CEST)
- Postal code: 8822, 8820
- Area code: 03586
- Vehicle registration: MU
- Website: www.muehlen.at

Mühlen is a municipality in the district of Murau in Styria, Austria.

== Geography ==
Mühlen lies about 28 km southeast of Murau.
