= Laßnitz bei Murau =

- Former municipality
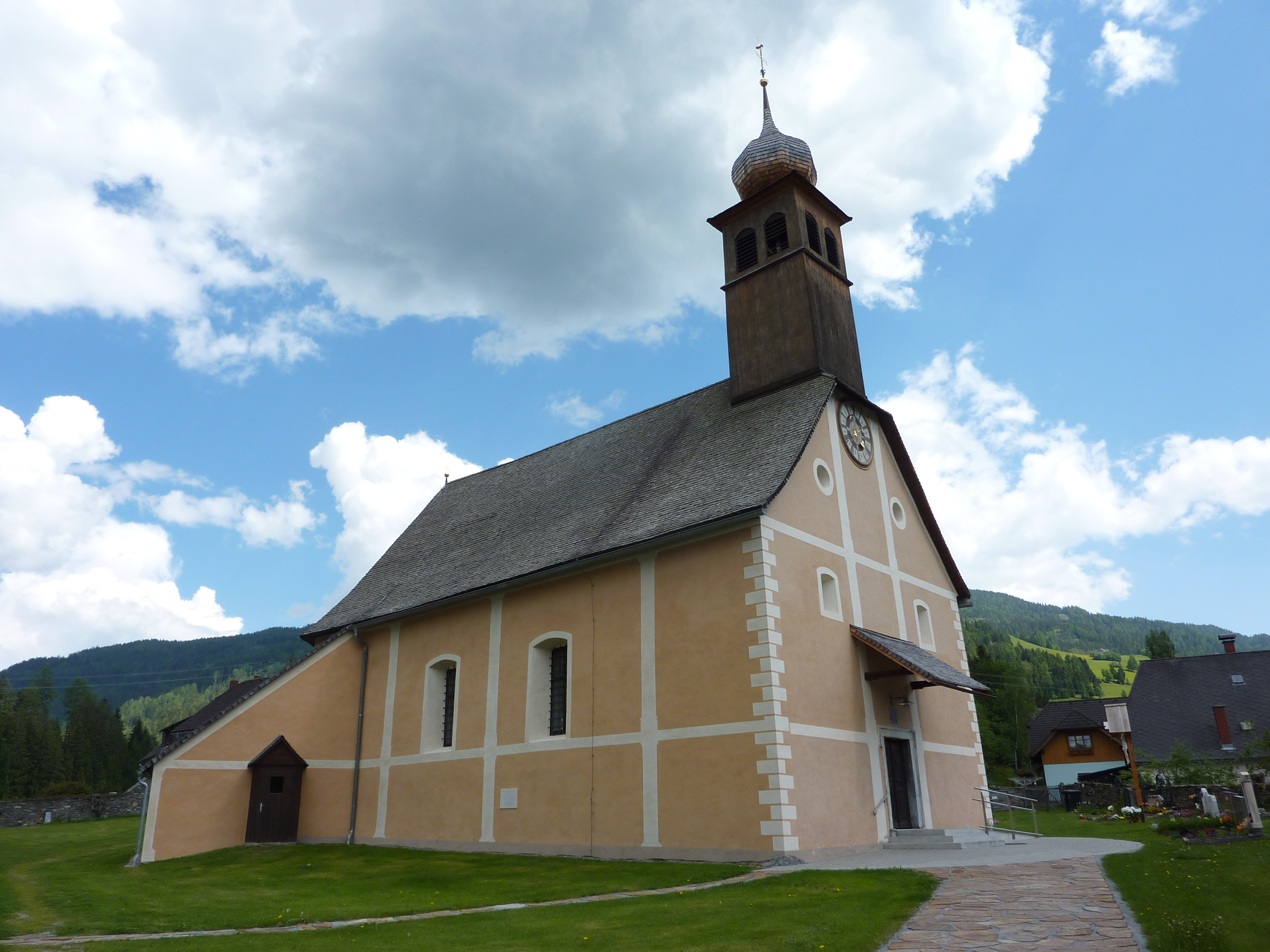
- Parish church in Laßnitz

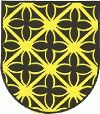
- Coat of arms

- Location within Austria
- Coordinates: 47°04′23″N 14°11′42″E
- Country: Austria
- State: Styria
- District: Murau

Area
  - Total: 45.55 km^{2} (17.59 sq mi)
- Elevation: 1,008 m (3,307 ft)

Population (1 January 2016)
  - Total: 1,036
  - Density: 22.74/km^{2} (58.91/sq mi)
- Time zone: UTC+1 (CET)
  - Summer (DST): UTC+2 (CEST)
- Postal code: 8813, 8812, 8820
- Area code: 03532
- Vehicle registration: MU
- Website: www.lassnitz-murau.at

Laßnitz bei Murau is a former municipality in the district of Murau in Styria, Austria. Since the 2015 Styria municipal structural reform, it is part of the municipality Murau.

== Geography ==
Laßnitz lies between Murau and Sankt Lambrecht.
