= Rinegg =

- Former municipality
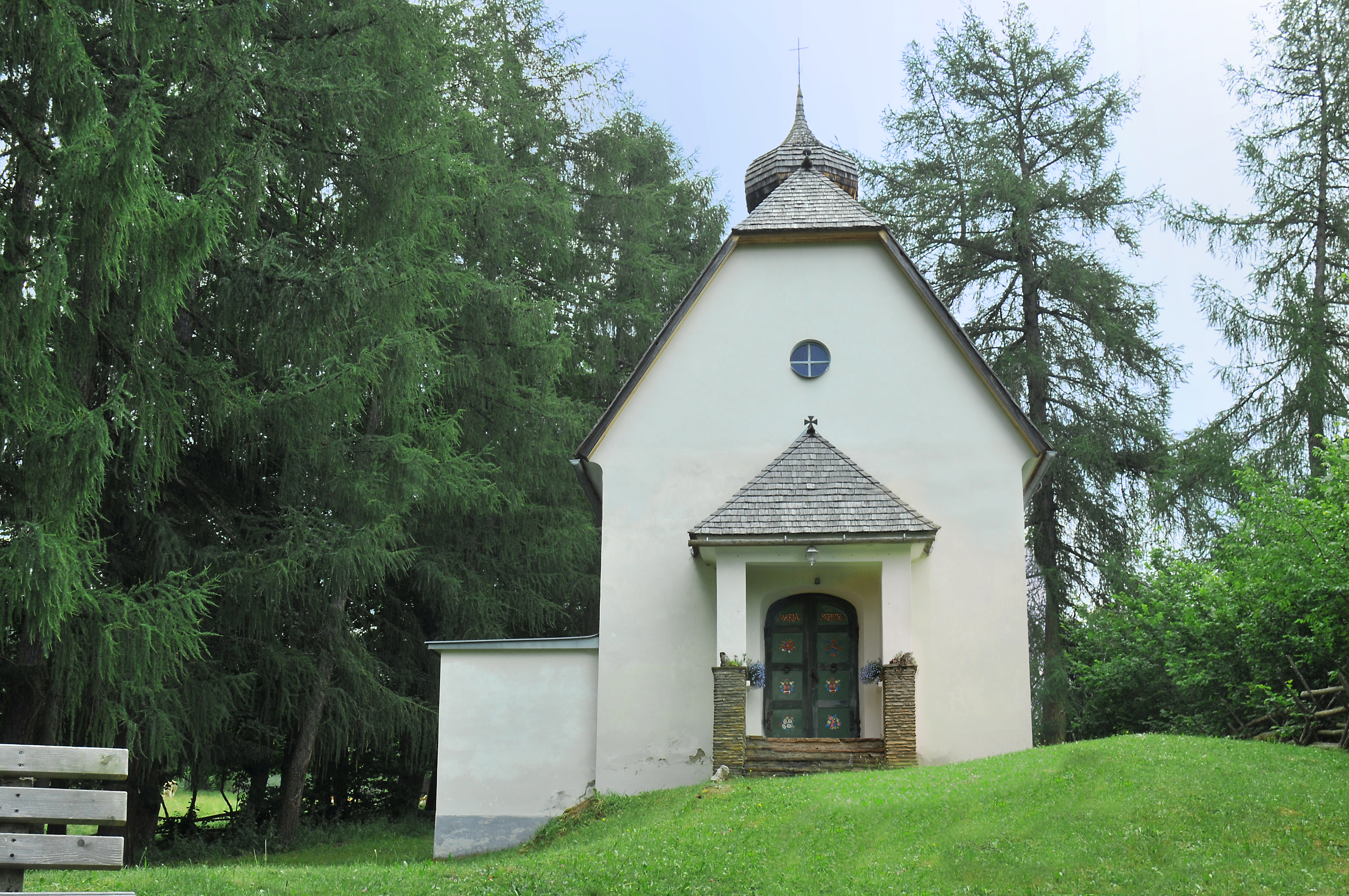
- Saint Mary pilgrimage church

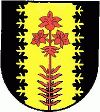
- Coat of arms

- Location within Austria
- Coordinates: 47°09′16″N 14°08′07″E
- Country: Austria
- State: Styria
- District: Murau

Area
  - Total: 13.65 km^{2} (5.27 sq mi)
- Elevation: 1,150 m (3,770 ft)

Population (1 January 2016)
  - Total: 147
  - Density: 10.8/km^{2} (27.9/sq mi)
- Time zone: UTC+1 (CET)
  - Summer (DST): UTC+2 (CEST)
- Postal code: 8844, 8812, 8813
- Area code: 03536
- Vehicle registration: MU
- Website: www.rinegg.at

Rinegg was a municipality in the district of Murau in Styria, Austria. It was merged into Ranten on 1 January 2015.
