= Martin Zeiler =

German Author

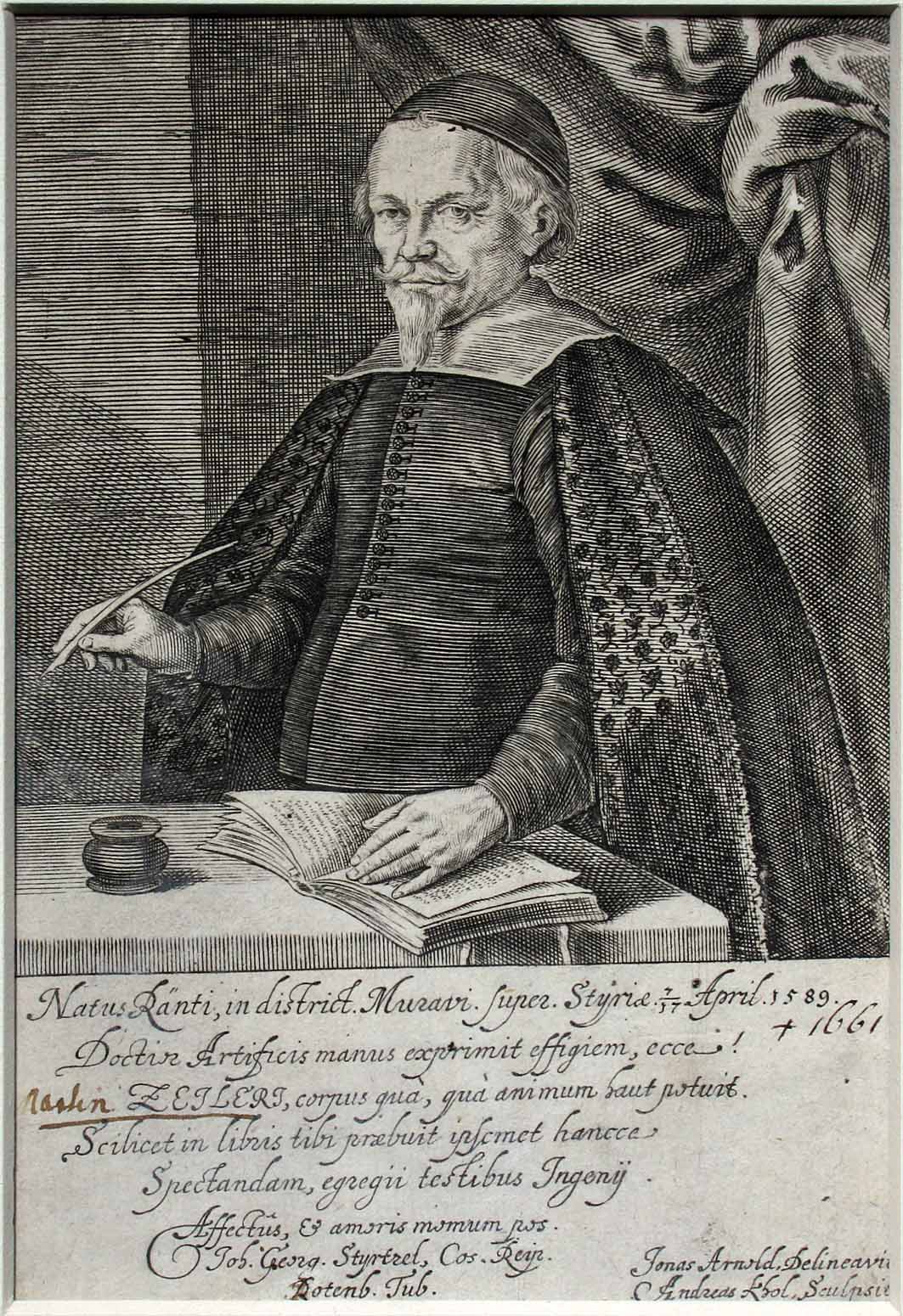
- Contemporary portrait by A. Kohl
- Born: 17 April 1589; Ranten, Austria, Holy Roman Empire
- Died: 6 October 1661 (aged 72); Ulm, Holy Roman Empire
- Writing career
- Language: German

Martin Zeiler (also Zeiller, born 17 April 1589 in Ranten, died 6 October 1661 in Ulm) was a Baroque era German author.

Zeiler's father was an exile from Upper Styria, forced to emigrate due to his protestant confession. Zeiler was schooled in Ulm, moving to Wittenberg in 1608 to study jurisprudence and history. He worked several jobs as private teacher and notary. He lived in Ulm from 1629, working as teacher and inspector at local schools.

Zeiler was very productive as an author, meeting the template of the Baroque polyhistor. The Ulm city library lists 90 works authored by Zeiler. His productivity was recognized by his contemporaries; Georg Philipp Harsdörffer mentions Herrn Zeillers proverbial industriousness in one of his poems. Zeiler is best known for his contribution to Matthäus Merian's Topographia Germaniae (16 vol., 1642–1654).

== Works ==
see wikisource:de:Martin Zeiller

- (Trad.) François de Rosset: Theatrum tragicum ... in die Teutsche Sprache transferirt durch M. Zeiller, hg. Martin Opitz. Danzig 1640 u.ö. (25 Auflagen sind bekannt)
- Itinerarium Italiae Nov-Antiquae. Frankfurt 1640
- Fidus achates, oder Getreuer Reisgefert. Ulm 1651
- Historici, chronologici et geographi ... quo vixerunt, et operibus ... scripserunt. 2 Bde. Ulm 1652
- 100 Dialogi oder Gespräch von unterschiedlichen Sachen. Ulm 1653
- Handbuch von allerley nutzlichen Erinerungen. 2 Bde. Ulm 1655
- Hispaniae et Lusitaniae Itinerarium. Amsterdam 1656
- Topographia Germaniae
- Topographia Galliae

== Sources and external links ==
- Literature by and about Martin Zeiler in the German National Library catalogue
- Ulrich Gaier u.a. (ed.): Schwabenspiegel, Bd. 1, Ulm 2003, S. 496 (Autorenlexikon)
- Walter Brunner: Martin Zeiller (1589–1661) – Ein Gelehrtenleben. Graz 1990
- Walther Killy: Killy Literaturlexikon: Autoren und Werke deutscher Sprache. (15 Bände) Gütersloh; München: Bertelsmann-Lexikon-Verl. 1988–1991 (CD-ROM Berlin 1998 ISBN 3-932544-13-7)
- Pictures and texts of Topographia Helvetiae, Rhaetiae et Valesiae by Matthaeus Merian et Martin Zeiller can be found in the database VIATIMAGES.
- Max von Waldberg (1898). "Zeiller, Martin" . Allgemeine Deutsche Biographie (in German). Vol. 44. Leipzig: Duncker & Humblot. pp. 782–784.
- Constantin von Wurzbach: "Zeiler, Martin". In: Biographisches Lexikon des Kaiserthums Oesterreich. Band 59. Verlag L. C.
