= Schöder =

- Municipality
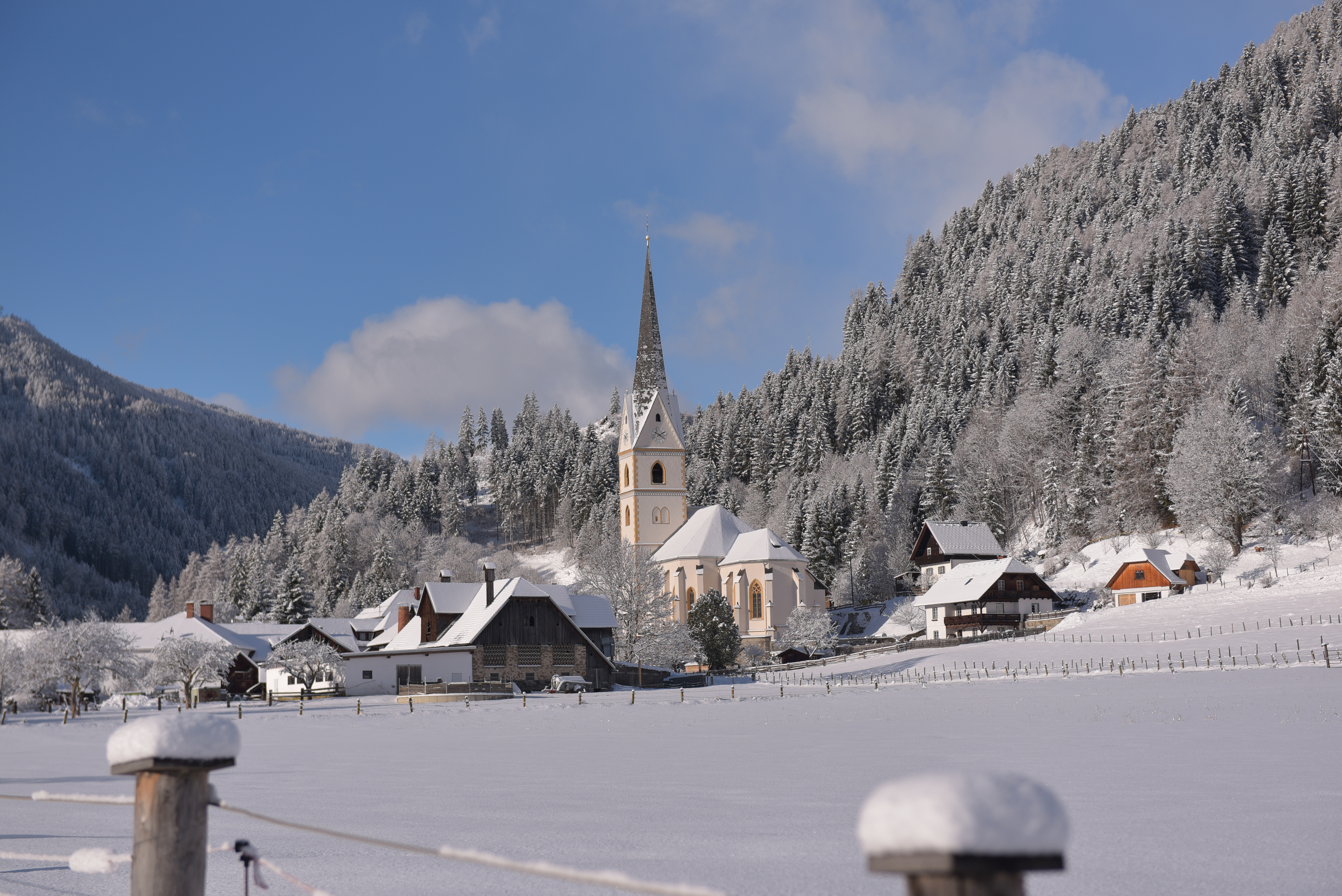
- Schöder in winter

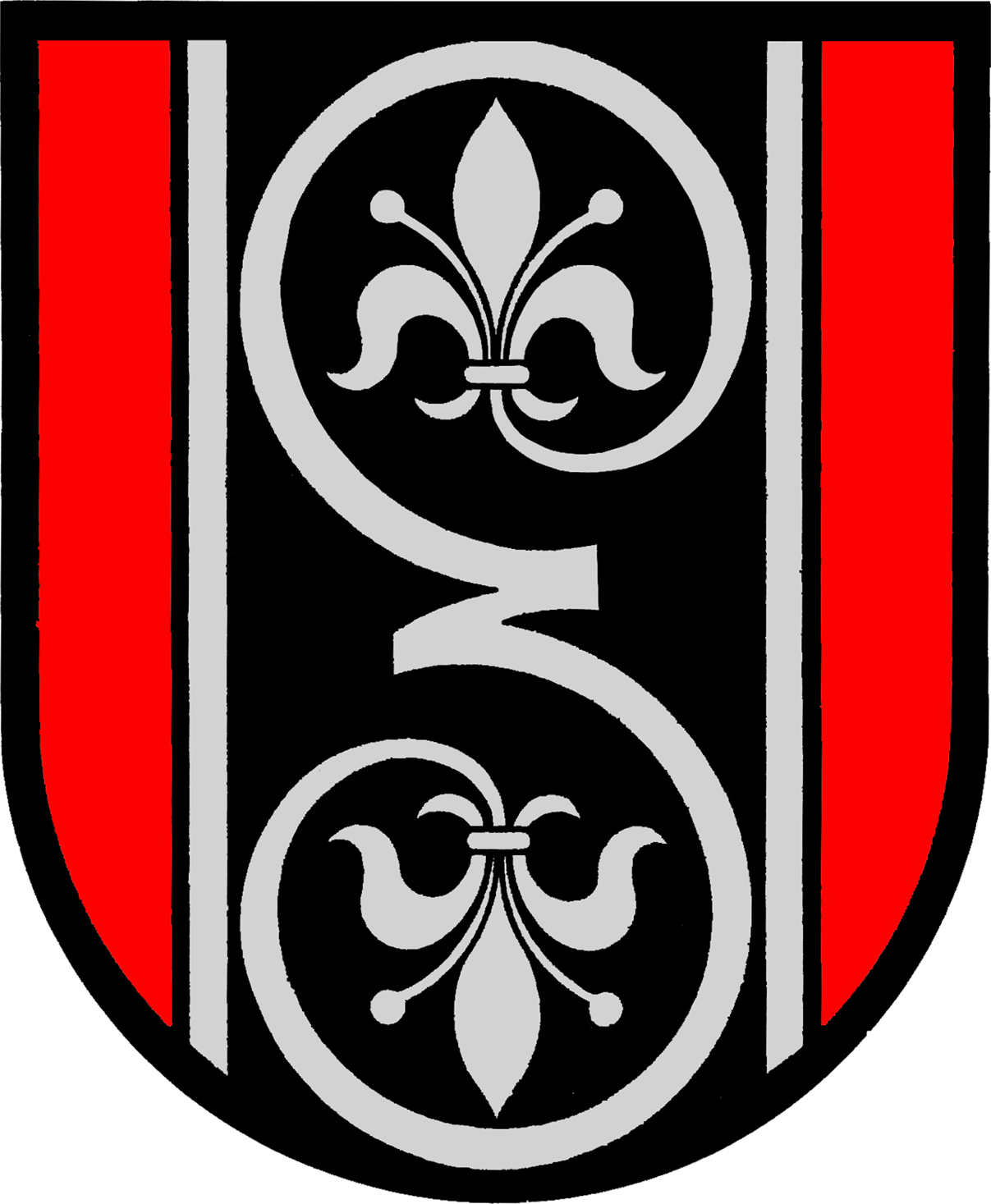
- Coat of arms

- Location within Austria
- Coordinates: 47°11′00″N 14°06′00″E
- Country: Austria
- State: Styria
- District: Murau

Government
  - Mayor: Rudolf Mürzl (OVP)

Area
  - Total: 74.61 km^{2} (28.81 sq mi)
- Elevation: 901 m (2,956 ft)

Population (2018-01-01)
  - Total: 942
  - Density: 12.6/km^{2} (32.7/sq mi)
- Time zone: UTC+1 (CET)
  - Summer (DST): UTC+2 (CEST)
- Postal code: 8844
- Area code: 03536
- Vehicle registration: MU
- Website: https://schoeder.gv.at/

Schöder is a municipality in the district of Murau in the Austrian state of Styria.

== Geography ==
Schöder lies at the foot of the Sölk Pass, which leads from the Mur valley to the Enns valley.
