= Niederwölz =

- Municipality
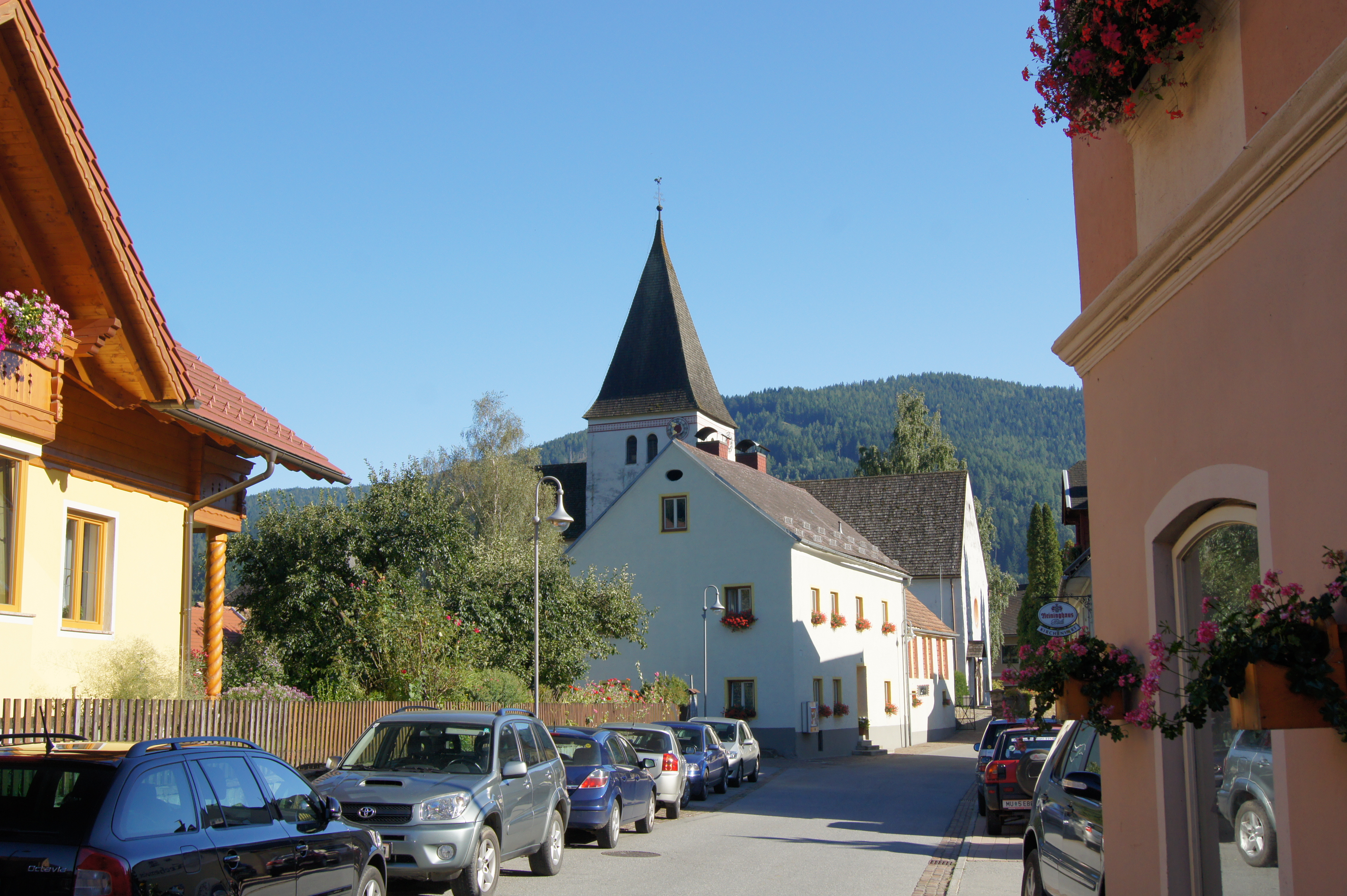
- Street with parish church

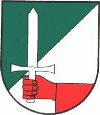
- Coat of arms

- Location within Austria
- Coordinates: 47°09′00″N 14°22′00″E
- Country: Austria
- State: Styria
- District: Murau

Government
  - Mayor: Walter Koller (ÖVP)

Area
  - Total: 10.25 km^{2} (3.96 sq mi)
- Elevation: 748 m (2,454 ft)

Population (2018-01-01)
  - Total: 596
  - Density: 58.1/km^{2} (151/sq mi)
- Time zone: UTC+1 (CET)
  - Summer (DST): UTC+2 (CEST)
- Postal code: 8811, 8831
- Area code: 03582
- Vehicle registration: MU
- Website: www.niederwoelz. steiermark.at

Niederwölz is a municipality in the district of Murau in the Austrian state of Styria.

== Geography ==
Niederwölz lies in the upper valley of the Mur.
