= Sankt Lambrecht =

- Municipality
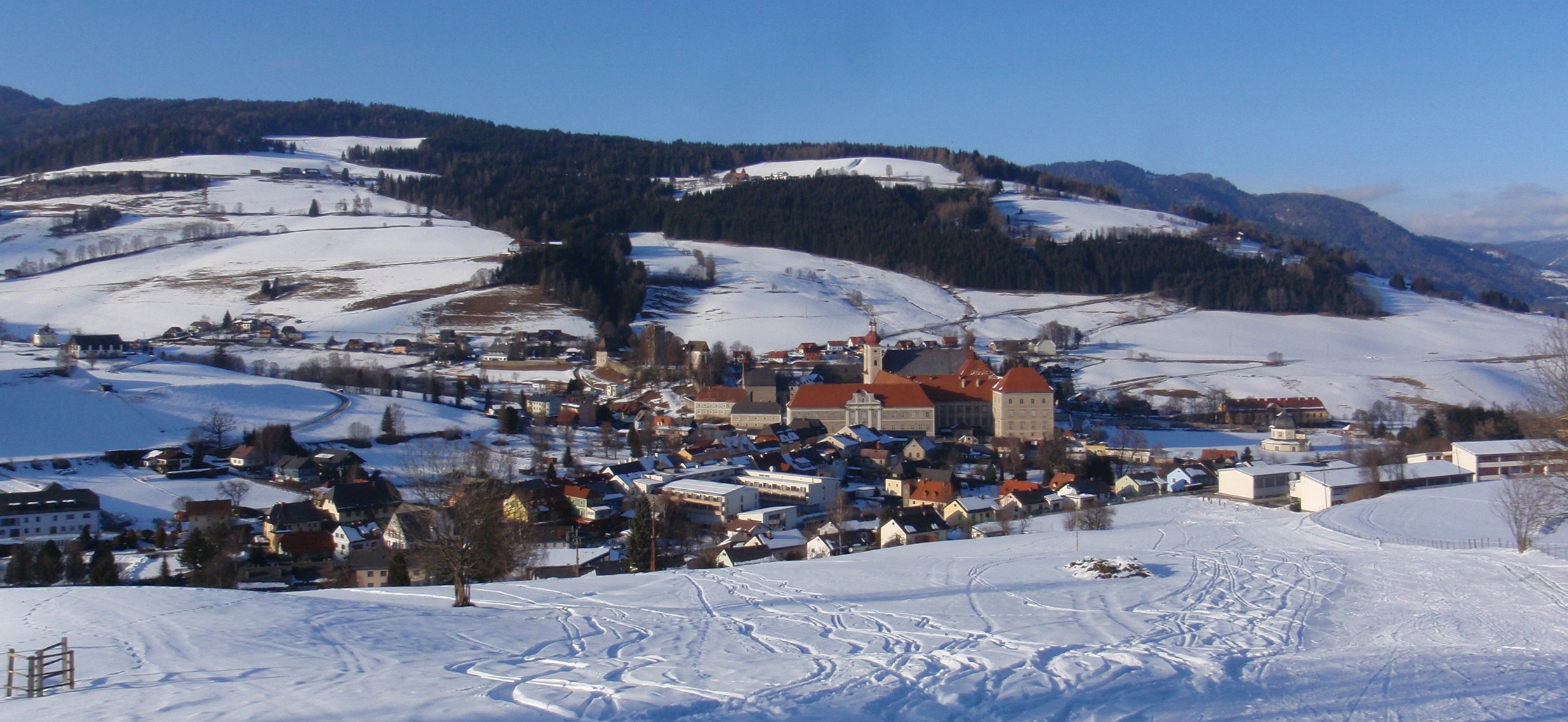

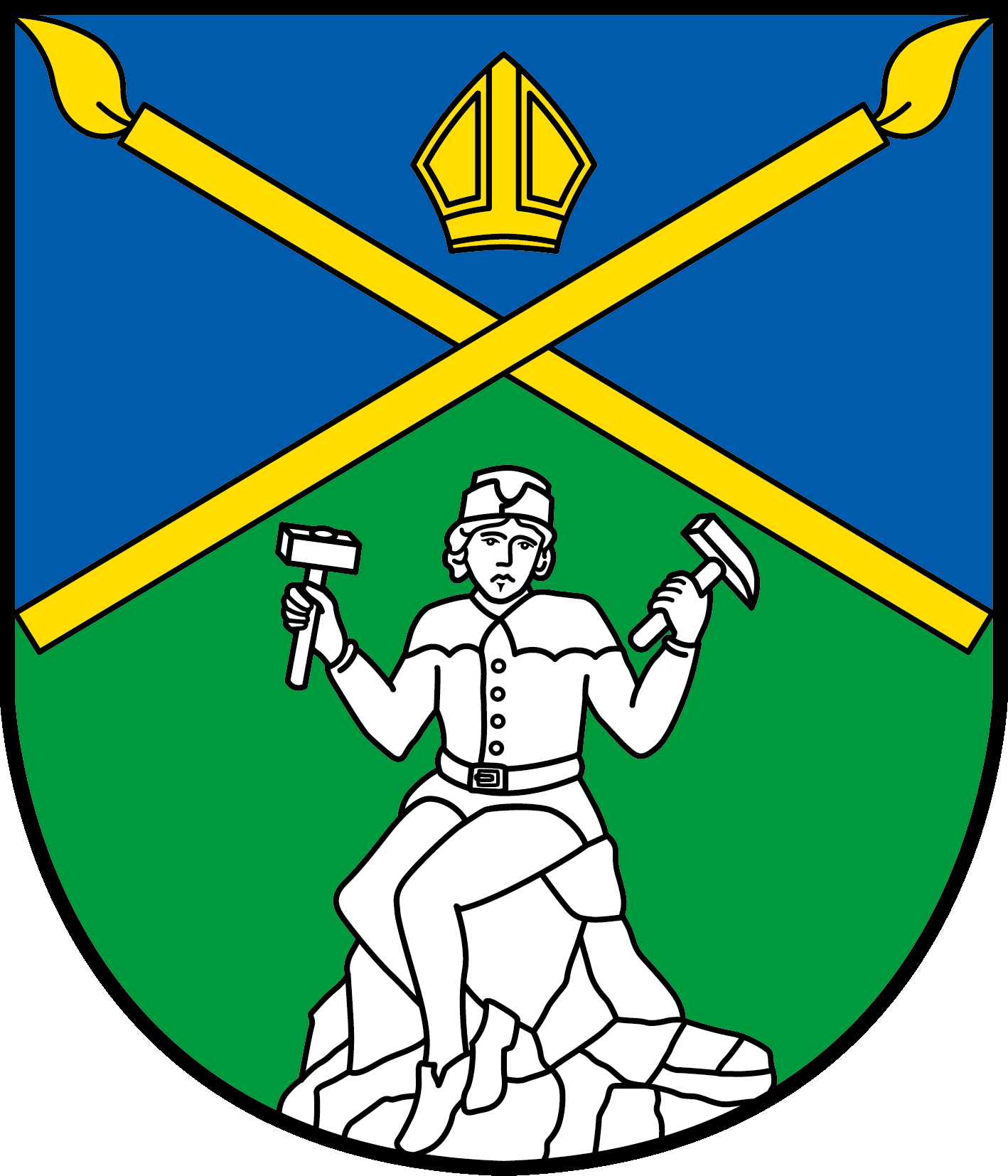
- Coat of arms

- Location within Austria
- Coordinates: 47°04′00″N 14°18′00″E
- Country: Austria
- State: Styria
- District: Murau

Government
  - Mayor: Fritz Sperl (ÖVP)

Area
  - Total: 70.41 km^{2} (27.19 sq mi)
- Elevation: 1,028 m (3,373 ft)

Population (2018-01-01)
  - Total: 1,841
  - Density: 26.15/km^{2} (67.72/sq mi)
- Time zone: UTC+1 (CET)
  - Summer (DST): UTC+2 (CEST)
- Postal code: 8813
- Area code: +43 3585
- Vehicle registration: MU
- Website: www.stlambrecht.at

Sankt Lambrecht (Austrian German pronunciation: [saŋkt ˈlambrɛçt]) is a market town in the district of Murau in Styria, Austria. It is known for Saint Lambert's Abbey, one of the most important Benedictine monasteries in Austria. The monastery complex and its gardens are part of the Zirbitzkogel-Grebenzen nature park.

In the course of a Styrian administrative reform, the former municipality of Sankt Blasen merged into Sankt Lambrecht with effect from 1 January 2015.

== Geography ==
The Upper Styrian municipality is located in the Thaja valley (Thajagraben) within the northern Gurktal Alps, east of the district capital Murau and near the Styrian-Carinthian border. At a height of 1,028 m (3,373 ft) above sea level, Sankt Lambrecht is the highest situated market town in Styria. Trades practiced here are woodworking (windows, furniture, chairs), a dynamite factory (explosives, military products), and tourism.

The municipal area comprises the cadastral communities of Sankt Lambrecht and Sankt Blasen.

== History ==
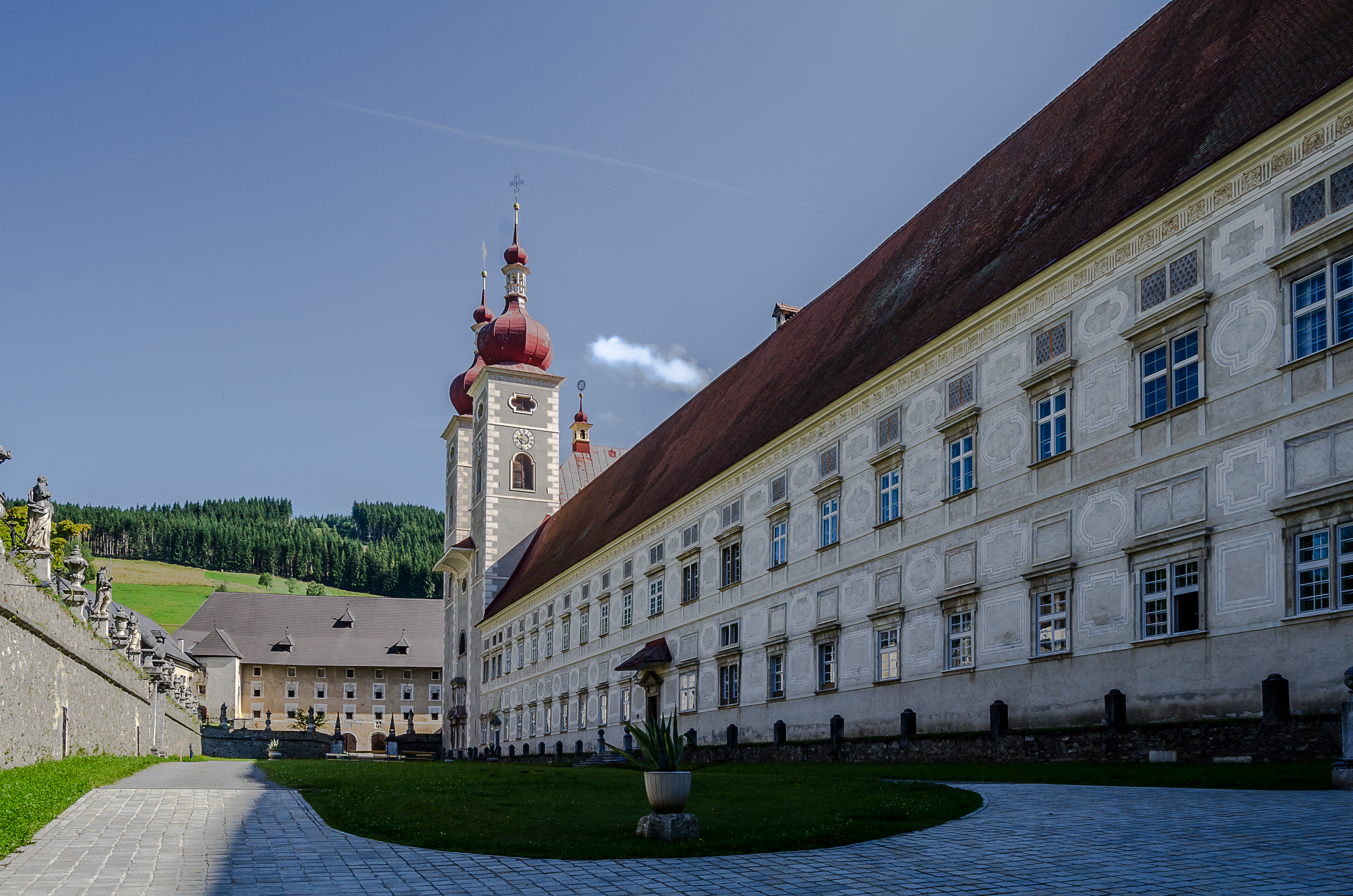
Saint Lambert's Abbey

The Benedictine abbey was established in 1076 by the Margraves of Styria. A first Romanesque basilica was consecrated in 1160, after a blaze it was rebuilt in the preserved Gothic hall church style until 1421.

After the Austrian Anschluss to Nazi Germany in 1938, Saint Lambert's Abbey was seized by the Nazi authorities. During World War II the premises housed two sub-camps of the infamous Mauthausen-Gusen concentration camp, one for male inmates and one for females.

== Politics ==
Seats in the municipal assembly (Gemeinderat) as of 2015 local elections:

- Austrian People's Party (ÖVP): 8
- Social Democratic Party of Austria (SPÖ): 5
- Freedom Party of Austria (FPÖ): 2

=== Sister city / Twin city ===
The city is twinned with:

- (Slovenia) Lukovica
