= Stolzalpe =

- Former municipality
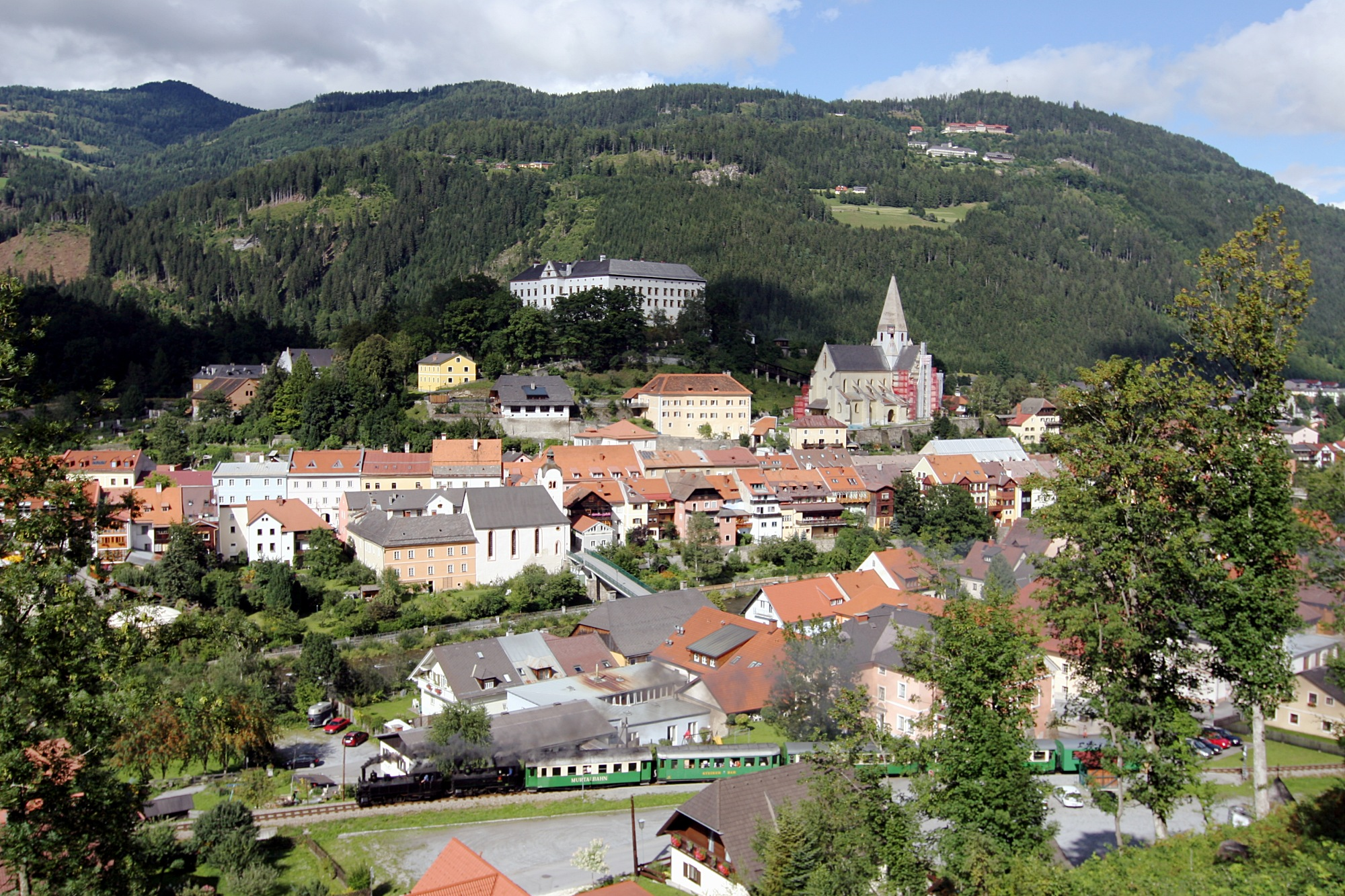
- View of Stolzalpe

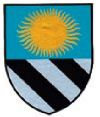
- Coat of arms

- Location within Austria
- Coordinates: 47°07′10″N 14°11′20″E
- Country: Austria
- State: Styria
- District: Murau

Area
  - Total: 11 km^{2} (4.2 sq mi)

Population (1 January 2016)
  - Total: 457
  - Density: 42/km^{2} (110/sq mi)
- Time zone: UTC+1 (CET)
  - Summer (DST): UTC+2 (CEST)
- Postal code: 8852
- Area code: 03532
- Vehicle registration: MU
- Website: www.gemeinde-stolzalpe.at

Stolzalpe is a former municipality in the district of Murau in Styria, Austria. Since the 2015 Styria municipal structural reform, it is part of the municipality Murau.
