= Sankt Peter am Kammersberg =

St. Peter am Kammersberg
- Municipality
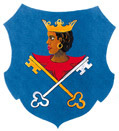
- Coat of arms

- Location within Austria
- Coordinates: 47°11′00″N 14°11′00″E
- Country: Austria
- State: Styria
- District: Murau

Government
  - Mayor: Herbert Gögelburger (ÖVP)

Area
  - Total: 84.6 km^{2} (32.7 sq mi)
- Elevation: 850 m (2,790 ft)

Population (2018-01-01)
  - Total: 2,043
  - Density: 24.1/km^{2} (62.5/sq mi)
- Time zone: UTC+1 (CET)
  - Summer (DST): UTC+2 (CEST)
- Postal code: 8843
- Area code: 03536
- Vehicle registration: MU
- Website: www.st-peter-kammersberg.steiermark.at

Sankt Peter am Kammersberg is a small village in Austria in the state of Styria with 2,076 inhabitants (as of 2016-01-01). It was first mentioned in documents in the year 1007.

The municipality is divided as follow:

- Althofen
- Feistritz
- Kammersberg
- Mitterdorf
- Peterdorf
- Pöllau am Greim
- St. Peter

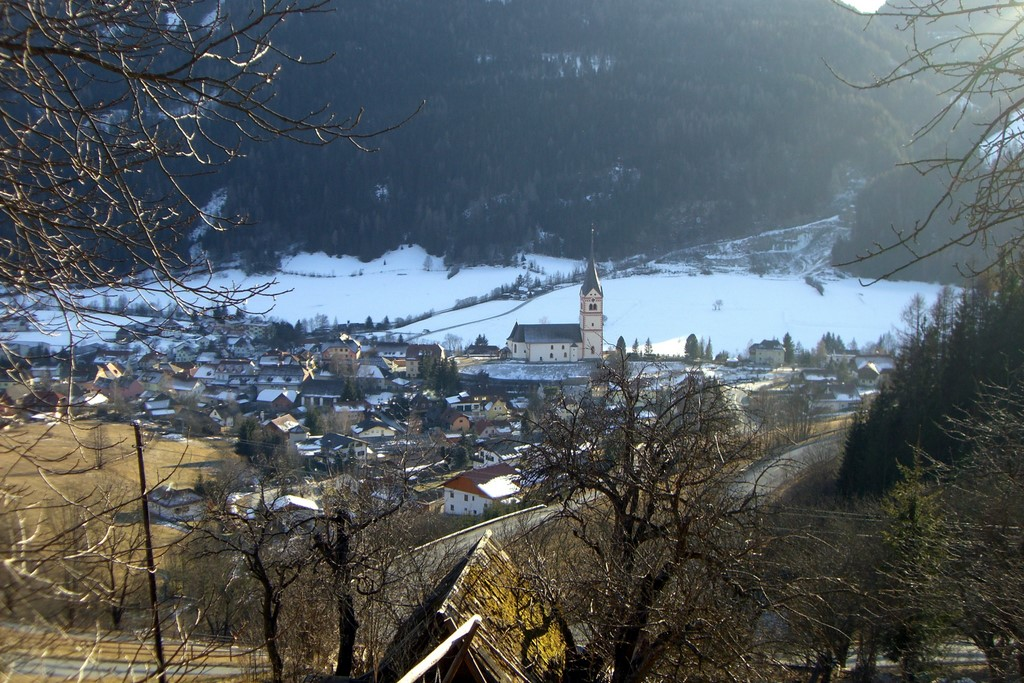
View of Sankt Peter from the top of the mountain
