= Topographia Germaniae =

17th century multi-volume book series published in Frankfurt, Germany

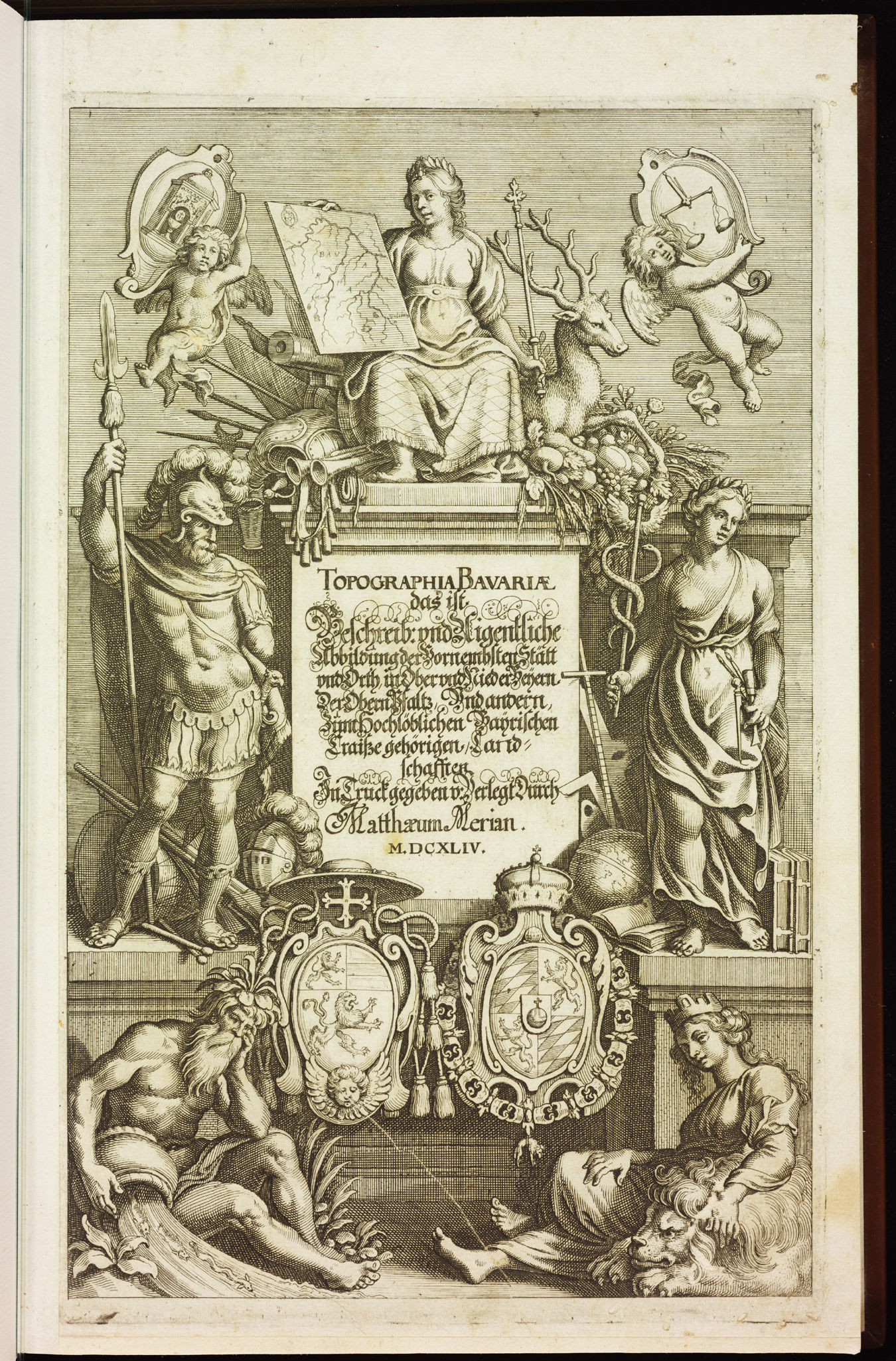
- Title page of Topographia Bavariae, 1665; part of Topographia Germaniae series
- Author: Martin Zeiler
- Illustrator: Caspar Merian, Matthäus Merian Jr.
- Language: German language
- Publisher: Matthäus Merian (engraver, 17th century), Bärenreiter-Verlag (republisher, 19th century)
- Publication place: Frankfurt
- Media type: 38 volume series of books

Topographia Germaniae (1642 – c. 1660s) is a multi-volume series of books created by engraver Matthäus Merian and writer Martin Zeiler, and published in Frankfurt in 38 parts. Engravers Wenceslaus Hollar, Caspar Merian, and Matthäus Merian Jr. also contributed illustrations. In the 1960s Bärenreiter-Verlag reproduced the work.

== Volumes ==
- Topographia Helvetiae, Rhaetiae et Valesiae. His Topographia Germaniae[3]. Bärenreiter-Verlag. 1642.
  - Contents: Switzerland; index
- Zeiller, Martin; Ältere), Matthaeus Merian (der (1643). Topographia Sueviae.
  - Contents: Swabia, including Augsburg; index
- Zeiller, Martin (1644). Topographia Alsatiae.
  - Contents: Alsace, includes Strassburg, etc.; index
- Zeiller, Martin (1644). Topographia Bavariae.
  - Contents: Bavaria; index
- Topographia Palatinatus Rheni et Vicinarum Regionum. 1645.
  - Contents: Rhine Palatinate; index
- Topographia Archiepiscopatuum Moguntinensis, Trevirensis et Coloniensis. 1646.
  - Contents: Archdioceses of Mainz, Trier and Cologne; index
- Ältere), Matthaeus Merian (der (1646). Topographia Hassiae et Regionum Vicinarum.
  - Contents: Hesse, including Frankfurt etc.; index
- Zeiller, Martin (1647). Topographia Westphaliae.
  - Contents: Westphalia, including Aachen etc.; index
- Ältere), Matthaeus Merian (der (1648). Topographia Franconiae.
  - Contents: Franconia, including Nuremberg etc.; index
- Zeiller, Martin (1649). Topographia Provinciarum Austriacarum Austriae, Styriae, Carinthiae, Carniolae, Tyrolis.
  - Contents: Austria; index
- Topographia Bohemiae, Moraviae et Silesiae. 1650.
  - Contents: Bohemia, Moravia and Silesia, including Prague etc.; index
  - 1960 reprint
- Topographia Superioris Saxoniae, Thüringiae, Misniae et Lusatiae. 1650.
  - Contents: Upper Saxony, Thuringia, Meissen and Lusatia, including Dresden, etc.; index
- Topographia Electoratus Brandenburgici et Ducatus Pomeraniae. 1652.
  - Contents: Brandenburg and Pomerania, including Berlin, Riga etc.; index
- Ältere), Matthaeus Merian (der; Zeiller, Martin (1653). Topographia Saxoniae Inferioris.
  - Contents: Lower Saxony, including Hamburg, Lubeck; index
- Topographia und Eigentliche Beschreibung Der ... Hertzogthumer Braunschweig und Lüneburg. 1654.
  - Contents: Brunswick and Lüneburg
- Zeiller, Martin (1654). Topographia Circuli Burgundici.
  - Contents: Burgundy, including Brussels etc.; index
