= Murau District =

Murau District Bezirk Murau (German)
- District
- Country: Austria
- State: Styria
- Capital: Murau
- Municipalities: 14

Government
  - District Governor: Florian Waldner

Area
  - Total: 1,394.6 km^{2} (538.5 sq mi)

Population (2025)
  - Total: 26,898
  - Density: 19.287/km^{2} (49.954/sq mi)
- Time zone: UTC+01:00 (CET)
  - Summer (DST): UTC+02:00 (CEST)
- Vehicle registration: MU
- NUTS code: AT226

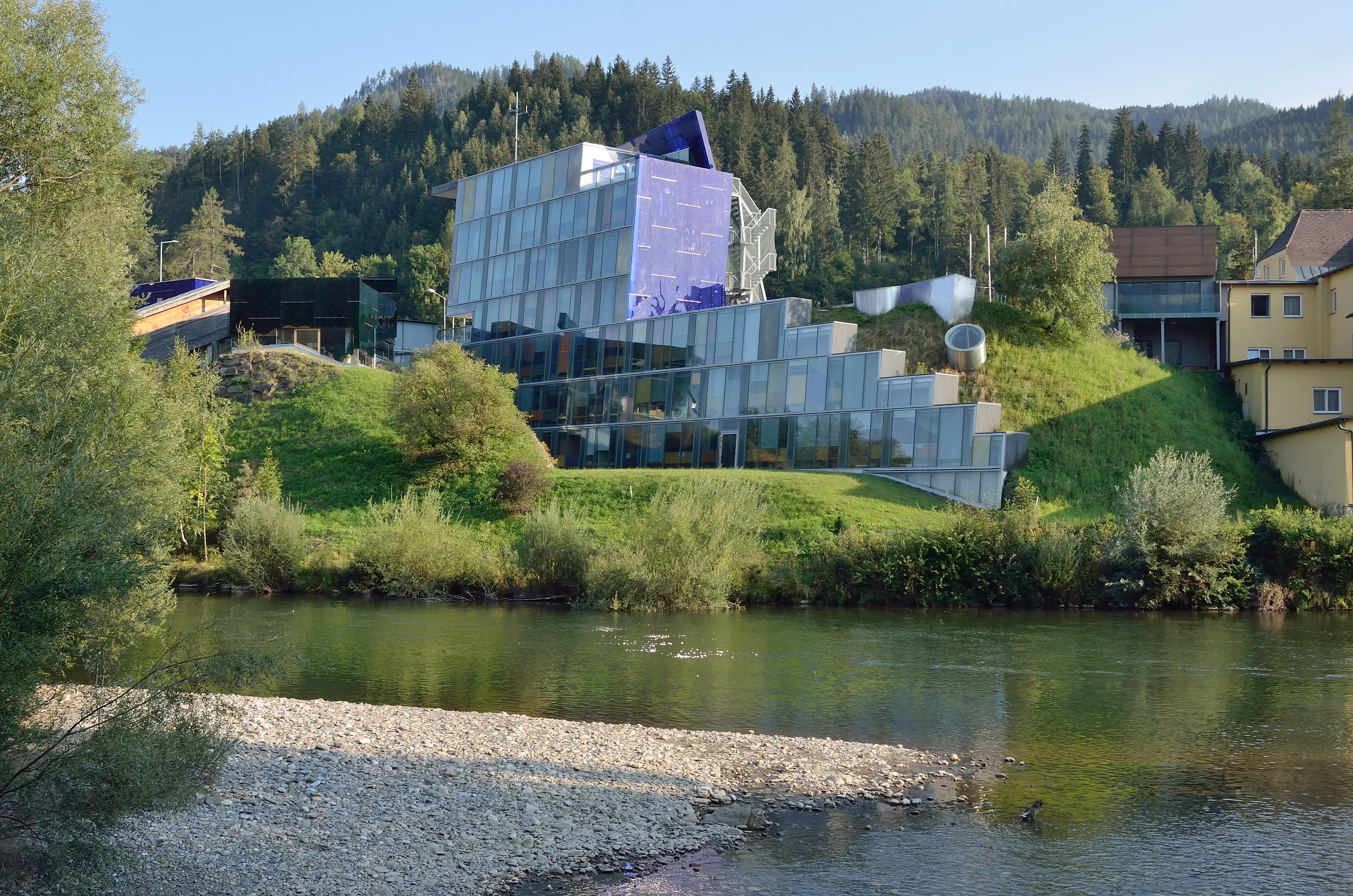
Bezirkshauptmannschaft in Murau

Murau District (German: Bezirk Murau [ˈmuːʁaʊ̯]) is a district of the state of Styria in Austria. It has 26,898 inhabitants.

== Municipalities ==
Since the 2015 Styria municipal structural reform, it consists of the following municipalities:

- Krakau
- Mühlen
- Murau
- Neumarkt in der Steiermark
- Niederwölz
- Oberwölz
- Ranten
- Sankt Georgen am Kreischberg
- Sankt Lambrecht
- Sankt Peter am Kammersberg
- Scheifling
- Schöder
- Stadl-Predlitz
- Teufenbach-Katsch

== Municipalities before 2015 ==
Suburbs, hamlets and other subdivisions of a municipality are indicated in small characters.

- Dürnstein in der Steiermark
  - Wildbad Einöd
- Frojach-Katsch
  - Frojach, Katsch an der Mur, Saurau
- Krakaudorf
- Krakauhintermühlen
- Krakauschatten
- Kulm am Zirbitz
- Laßnitz bei Murau
  - Laßnitz-Lambrecht, Laßnitz-Murau, Sankt Egidi
- Mariahof
  - Baierdorf
- Mühlen
  - Jakobsberg, Noreia, Sankt Veit in der Gegend
- Murau
- Neumarkt in Steiermark
- Niederwölz
- Oberwölz Stadt
  - Oberwölz, Vorstadt
- Oberwölz Umgebung
  - Hinterburg, Krumegg, Raiming, Salchau, Schöttl
- Perchau am Sattel
- Predlitz-Turrach
  - Einach, Predlitz, Turrach
- Ranten
  - Freiberg, Seebach
- Rinegg
- Sankt Blasen
- Sankt Georgen ob Murau
  - Bodendorf, Lutzmannsdorf, Sankt Lorenzen ob Murau
- Sankt Lambrecht
- Sankt Lorenzen bei Scheifling
  - Feßnach, Puchfeld
- Sankt Marein bei Neumarkt
  - Sankt Georgen bei Neumarkt
- Sankt Peter am Kammersberg
  - Althofen, Feistritz am Kammersberg, Kammersberg, Mitterdorf, Peterdorf, Pöllau am Greim
- Sankt Ruprecht-Falkendorf
  - Falkendorf, Sankt Ruprecht ob Murau
- Scheifling
  - Lind bei Scheifling
- Schöder
  - Baierdorf, Schöderberg
- Schönberg-Lachtal
  - Dürnberg, Schönberg bei Niederwölz
- Stadl an der Mur
  - Paal, Sonnberg, Stadl an der Mur, Steindorf
- Stolzalpe
- Teufenbach
- Triebendorf
- Winklern bei Oberwölz
  - Eselsberg, Mainhartsdorf
- Zeutschach

== Demographics ==
As of 2025, the population is 26,898, of which 49.4% are male and 50.6% are female. Minors make up 15.7% of the population, and seniors make up 26.1%.

Historical population

Year	Pop.	±%
1869	27,202	—
1880	27,185	−0.1%
1890	26,735	−1.7%
1900	26,967	+0.9%
1910	27,539	+2.1%
1923	27,961	+1.5%
1934	29,755	+6.4%
1939	29,368	−1.3%

Year	Pop.	±%
1951	32,453	+10.5%
1961	32,393	−0.2%
1971	32,845	+1.4%
1981	32,427	−1.3%
1991	32,257	−0.5%
2001	31,472	−2.4%
2011	29,186	−7.3%
2021	27,284	−6.5%

Source: Statistics Austria

=== Immigration ===
As of 2025, immigrants make up 6.2% of the total population. The 5 largest foreign countries of birth are Germany, Hungary, Ukraine, Bosnia and Herzegovina, and Romania.
