= Sankt Blasen =

- Former municipality
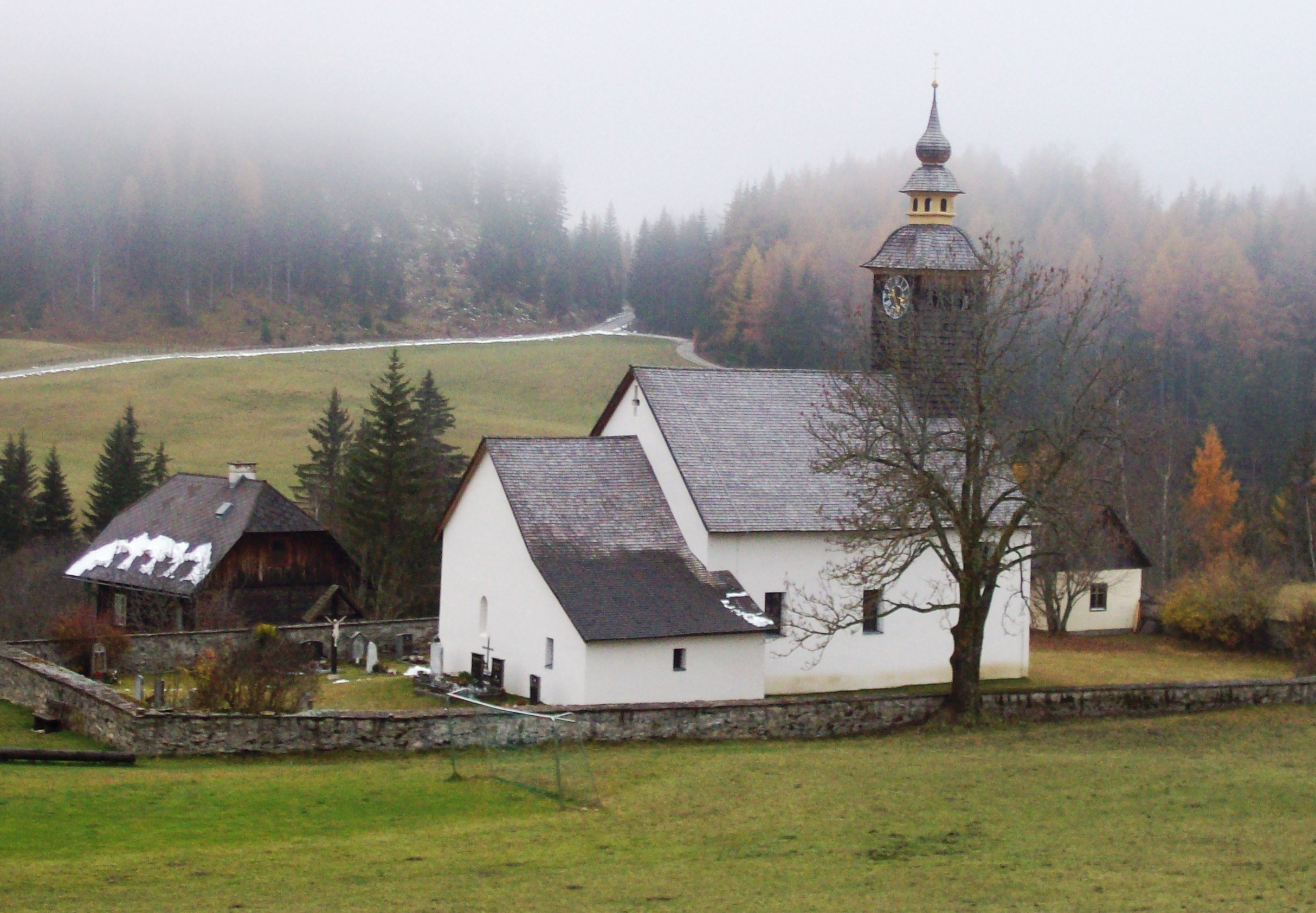
- Saint Martin church in Sankt Blasen

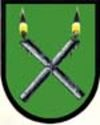
- Coat of arms

- Location within Austria
- Coordinates: 47°05′00″N 14°18′00″E
- Country: Austria
- State: Styria
- District: Murau

Area
  - Total: 26.66 km^{2} (10.29 sq mi)
- Elevation: 957 m (3,140 ft)

Population (1 January 2016)
  - Total: 552
  - Density: 20.7/km^{2} (53.6/sq mi)
- Time zone: UTC+1 (CET)
  - Summer (DST): UTC+2 (CEST)
- Postal code: 8812, 8813
- Area code: 03585
- Vehicle registration: MU
- Website: www.st-blasen.steiermark.at

Sankt Blasen is a former municipality in the district of Murau in the Austrian state of Styria. Since the 2015 Styria municipal structural reform, it is part of the municipality Sankt Lambrecht.

== Geography ==
Sankt Blasen lies in the mountains that form the boundary between Styria and Carinthia.
