= Triebendorf =

- Former municipality
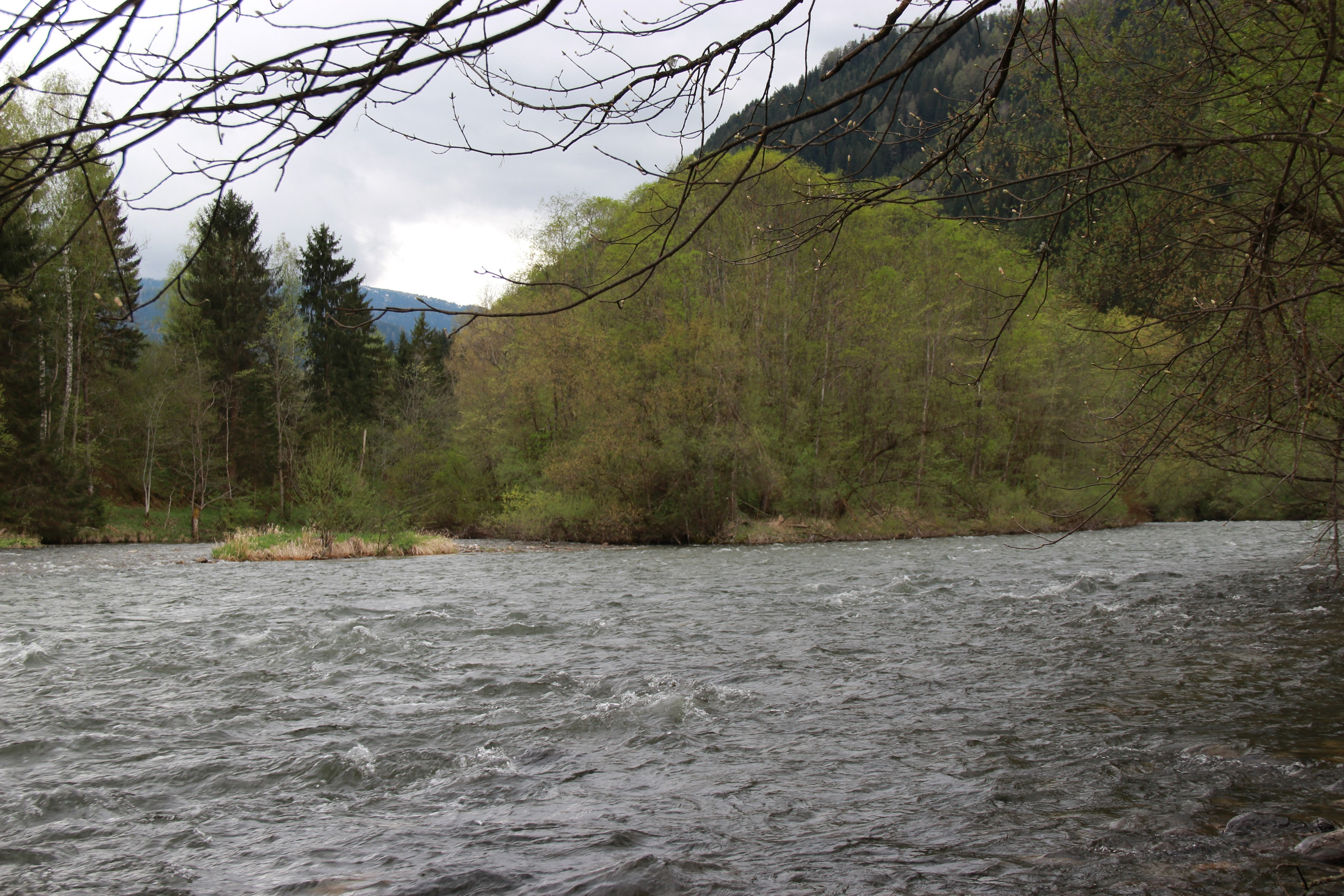
- Island in the Mur River at Triebendorf

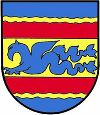
- Coat of arms

- Location within Austria
- Coordinates: 47°07′00″N 14°14′00″E
- Country: Austria
- State: Styria
- District: Murau

Area
  - Total: 8.52 km^{2} (3.29 sq mi)
- Elevation: 824 m (2,703 ft)

Population (1 January 2016)
  - Total: 134
  - Density: 15.7/km^{2} (40.7/sq mi)
- Time zone: UTC+1 (CET)
  - Summer (DST): UTC+2 (CEST)
- Postal code: 8850, 8842
- Area code: 03588
- Vehicle registration: MU
- Website: www.triebendorf. steiermark.at

Triebendorf is a former municipality in the district of Murau in the Austrian state of Styria. Since the 2015 Styria municipal structural reform, it is part of the municipality Murau.

== Geography ==
Triebendorf lies about 6 km east of Murau.
