= Ranten =

- Municipality
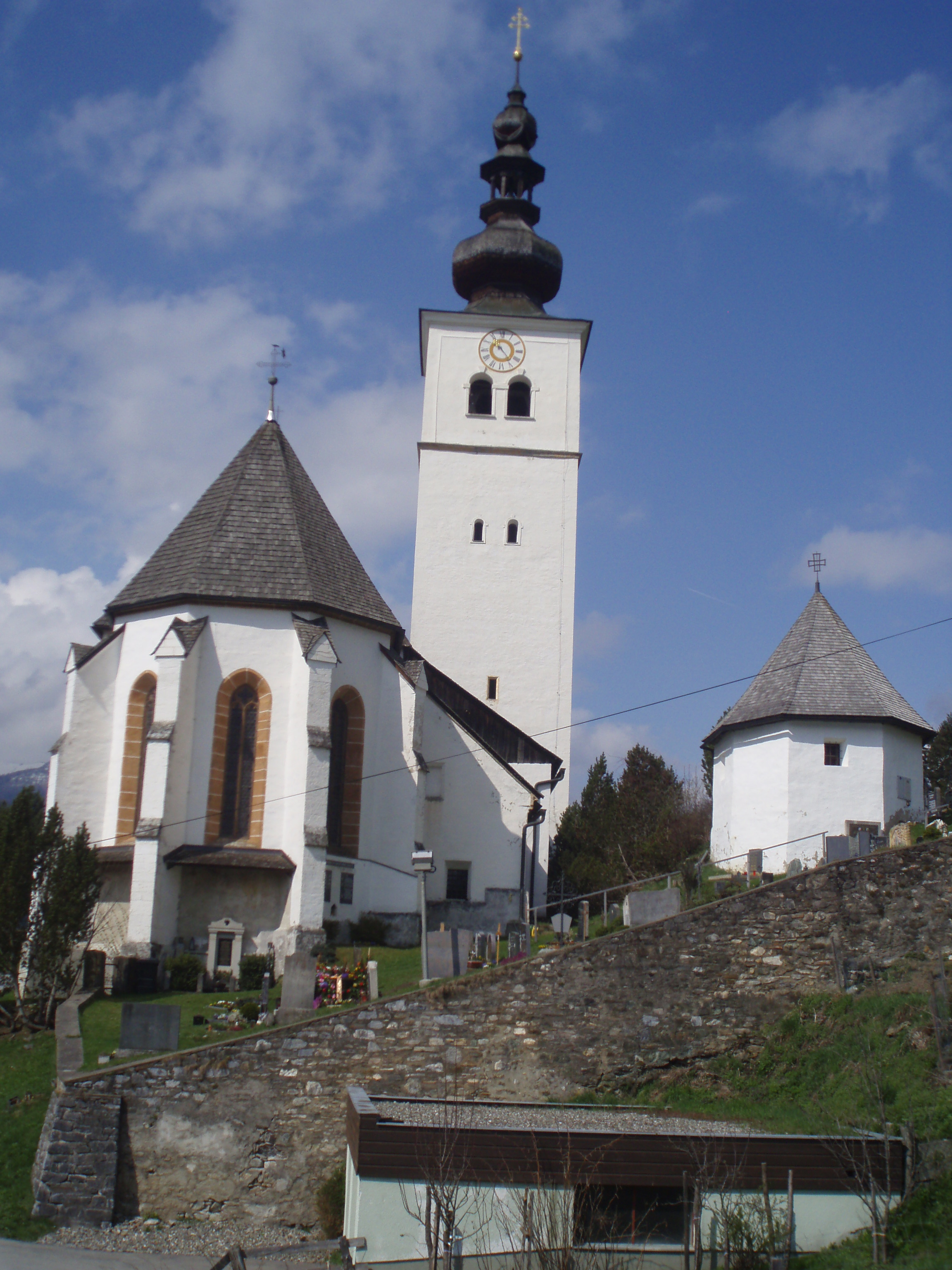
- Ranten parish church

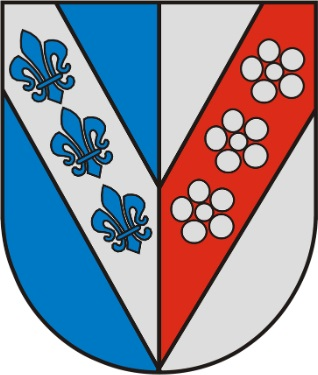
- Coat of arms

- Location within Austria
- Coordinates: 47°09′35″N 14°04′52″E
- Country: Austria
- State: Styria
- District: Murau

Government
  - Mayor: Johann Fritz (ÖVP)

Area
  - Total: 52.44 km^{2} (20.25 sq mi)
- Elevation: 951 m (3,120 ft)

Population (2018-01-01)
  - Total: 1,161
  - Density: 22.14/km^{2} (57.34/sq mi)
- Time zone: UTC+1 (CET)
  - Summer (DST): UTC+2 (CEST)
- Postal code: 8853
- Area code: 03535
- Vehicle registration: MU
- Website: www.ranten.steiermark.at

Ranten is a municipality in the district of Murau in Styria, Austria.

== Geography ==
Ranten lies 11 km northwest of Murau.
