= Scheifling =

- Municipality
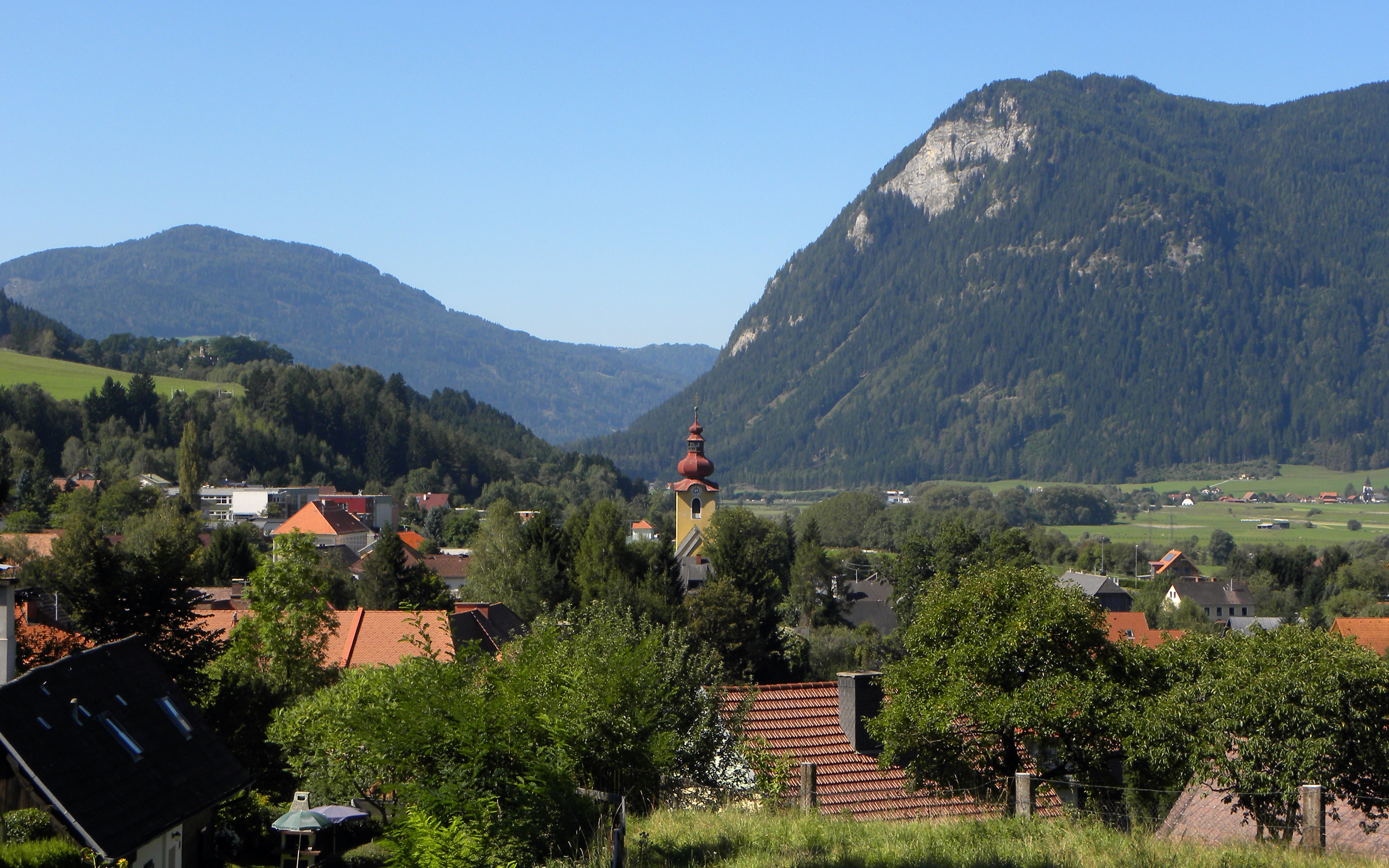
- View of Scheifling

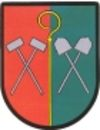
- Coat of arms

- Location within Austria
- Coordinates: 47°09′02″N 14°24′40″E
- Country: Austria
- State: Styria
- District: Murau

Government
  - Mayor: Michael Puster (SPÖ)

Area
  - Total: 57.41 km^{2} (22.17 sq mi)
- Elevation: 762 m (2,500 ft)

Population (2018-01-01)
  - Total: 2,134
  - Density: 37.17/km^{2} (96.27/sq mi)
- Time zone: UTC+1 (CET)
  - Summer (DST): UTC+2 (CEST)
- Postal code: 8811
- Area code: 03582
- Vehicle registration: MU
- Website: www.scheifling. steiermark.at

Scheifling is a village in Austria in the state of Styria.

== History ==
It was first mentioned 978 AD as 'Sublich'.

== Culture ==
One of many riparian villages along the Mur river, Scheifling is a popular stop for bicyclists traveling along the Mur Bike Trail. It boasts several comfortable inns and restaurants, including the Gasthof Götzl-Rosenkranz (founded in the 19th century). In early July, villagers celebrate the "Scheiflinger Kirta" with live music and dancing.
