= Neumarkt in der Steiermark =

Place in Styria, Austria

- Municipality
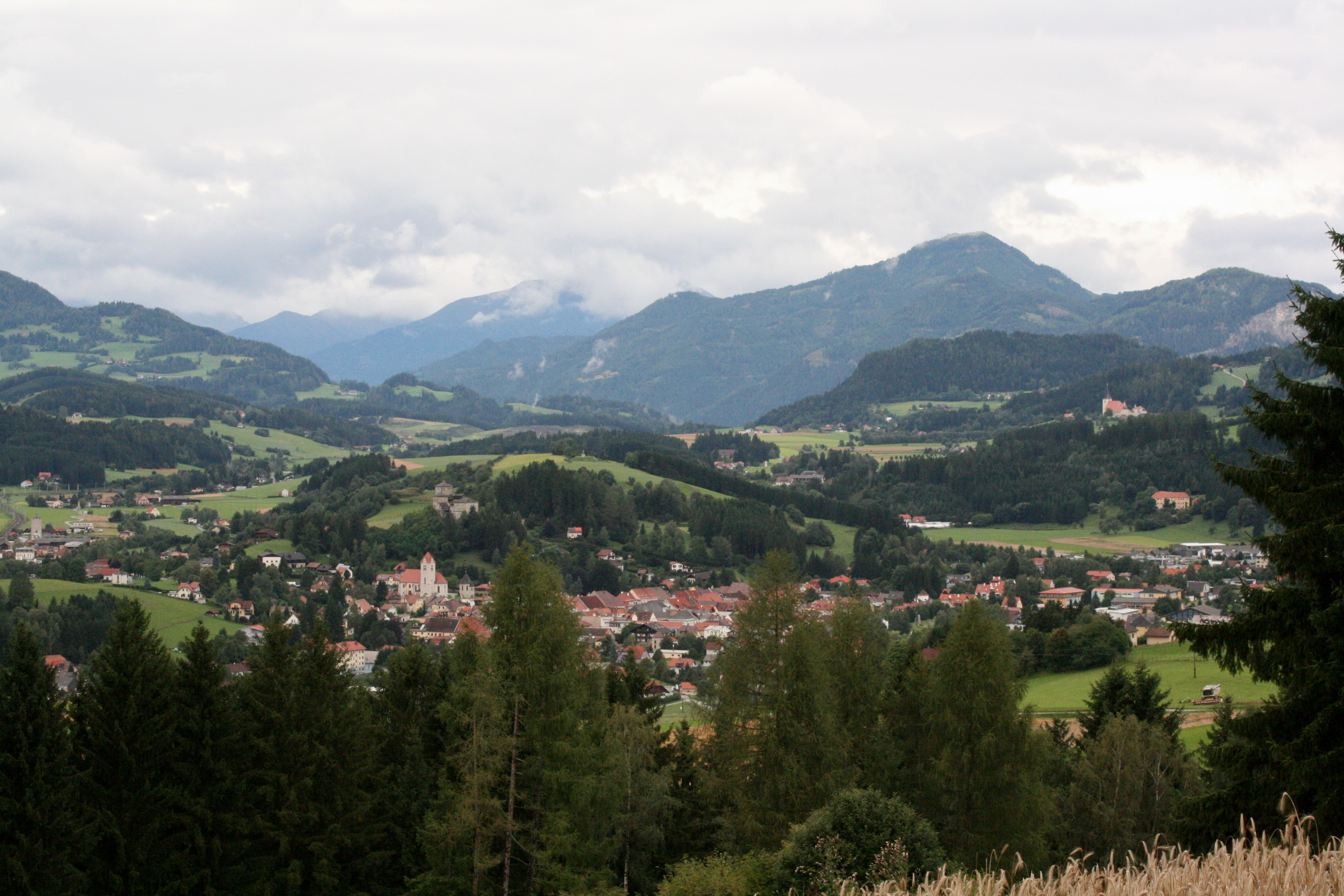
- View of Neumarkt

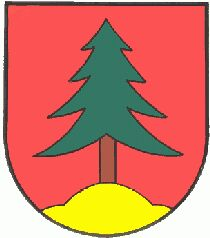
- Coat of arms

- Location within Austria
- Coordinates: 47°04′15″N 14°25′22″E
- Country: Austria
- State: Styria
- District: Murau

Government
  - Mayor: Josef Maier (ÖVP)

Area
  - Total: 163.55 km^{2} (63.15 sq mi)
- Elevation: 847 m (2,779 ft)

Population (1 January 2016)
  - Total: 5,068
  - Density: 30.99/km^{2} (80.26/sq mi)
- Time zone: UTC+1 (CET)
  - Summer (DST): UTC+2 (CEST)
- Postal code: 8820
- Area code: 03584
- Vehicle registration: MU
- Website: www.neumarkt.steiermark.at

Neumarkt in der Steiermark is a municipality in the district of Murau in Styria, Austria.

== International relations ==
=== Twin towns – Sister cities ===
Neumarkt is twinned with:

- Monfalcone, Italy
