= Murau =

- Municipality
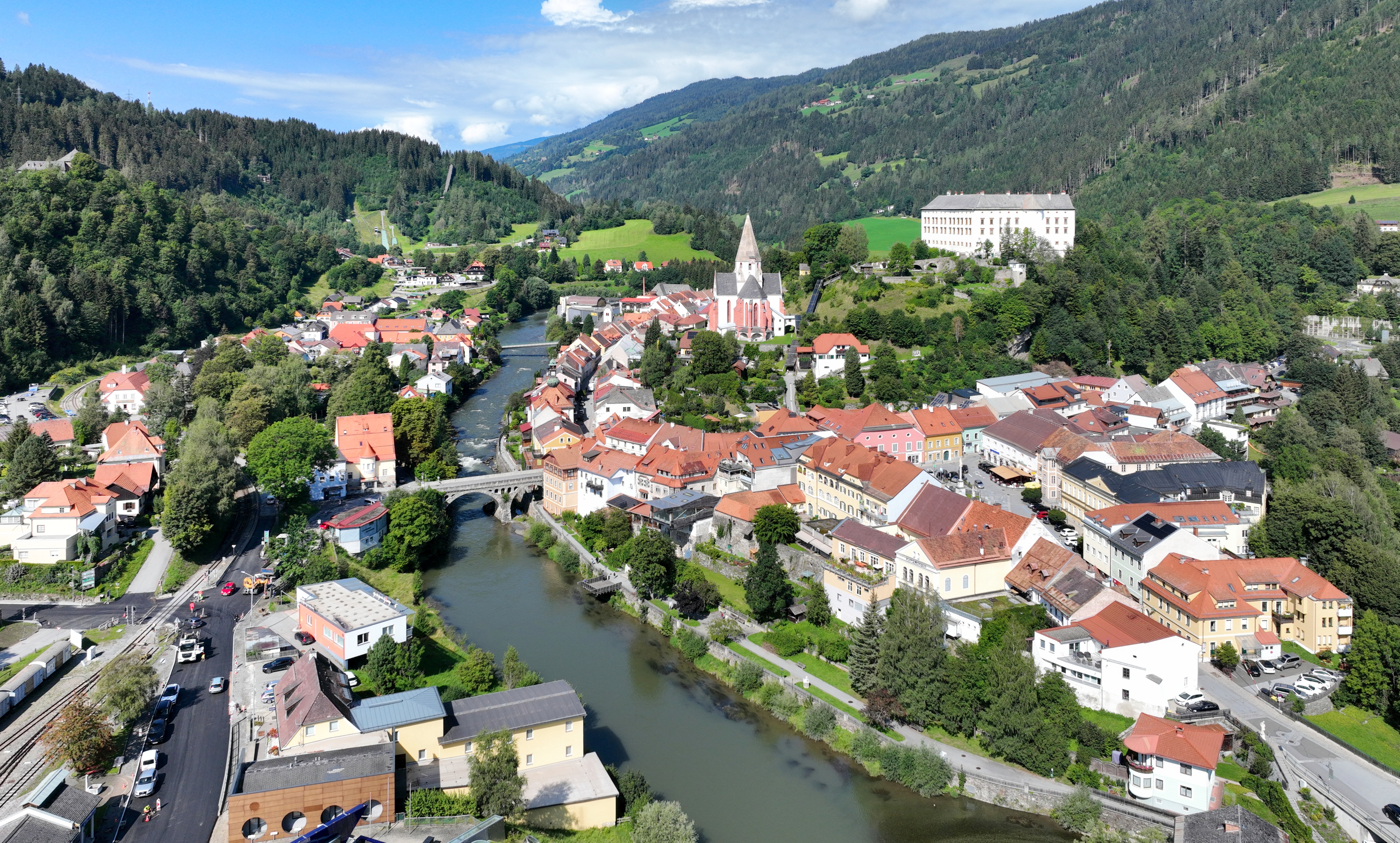
- East view of Murau

- Coat of arms

- Location within Austria
- Coordinates: 47°06′43″N 14°10′23″E
- Country: Austria
- State: Styria
- District: Murau

Government
  - Mayor: Thomas Kalcher (ÖVP)

Area
  - Total: 76.66 km^{2} (29.60 sq mi)
- Elevation: 829 m (2,720 ft)

Population (2018-01-01)
  - Total: 3,629
  - Density: 47.34/km^{2} (122.6/sq mi)
- Time zone: UTC+1 (CET)
  - Summer (DST): UTC+2 (CEST)
- Postal code: 8850
- Area code: 03532
- Vehicle registration: MU
- Website: murau.steiermark.at

Murau (German: [ˈmuːʁaʊ̯]) is a town in the western part of the Austrian federal state of Styria. It is the administrative seat of Murau District.

== Geography ==
The historic town is located in mountainous Upper Styria in the valley of the Mur river between the Lower Tauern range and the Gurktal Alps. The municipal area comprises the cadastral communities of Laßnitz-Lambrecht, Murau proper and Sankt Egidi, as well as the former independent municipalities of Laßnitz bei Murau, Stolzalpe and Triebendorf which were incorporated in the course of a 2015 administrative reform. Murau currently has a population of 3,688.

The town's economy largely depends on tourism, especially in the nearby Kreischberg ski resort. It is also known for its brewing tradition (Murauer Bier) documented since the 15th century. Murau station is a stop on the narrow-gauge Mur Valley Railway (Murtalbahn), running along the Mur river from Unzmarkt up to Mauterndorf in Salzburg.

=== Climate ===
Murau has a humid continental climate with cold winters and warm summers (Köppen:Dfb), very closely bordering on a subarctic climate (Köppen:Dfc). Winters are long, cold and dry while summers are short, refreshing and wet

Climate data for Murau, averages 1991-2020
Month	Jan	Feb	Mar	Apr	May	Jun	Jul	Aug	Sep	Oct	Nov	Dec	Year
Mean daily maximum °C (°F)	−1.1 (30.0)	0.3 (32.5)	4.3 (39.7)	9.4 (48.9)	14.4 (57.9)	18.2 (64.8)	19.8 (67.6)	19.3 (66.7)	14.8 (58.6)	10.4 (50.7)	4.5 (40.1)	0.2 (32.4)	9.5 (49.1)
Daily mean °C (°F)	−5.5 (22.1)	−4.1 (24.6)	−0.1 (31.8)	4.7 (40.5)	9.5 (49.1)	13.4 (56.1)	14.9 (58.8)	14.6 (58.3)	10.3 (50.5)	5.9 (42.6)	0.9 (33.6)	−3.9 (25.0)	5.1 (41.1)
Mean daily minimum °C (°F)	−9.7 (14.5)	−8.3 (17.1)	−4.4 (24.1)	−0.3 (31.5)	4.3 (39.7)	7.9 (46.2)	9.5 (49.1)	9.6 (49.3)	5.9 (42.6)	2.0 (35.6)	−2.2 (28.0)	−7.5 (18.5)	0.6 (33.0)
Average rainfall mm (inches)	43 (1.7)	46 (1.8)	64 (2.5)	79 (3.1)	109 (4.3)	128 (5.0)	127 (5.0)	128 (5.0)	100 (3.9)	89 (3.5)	83 (3.3)	56 (2.2)	1,052 (41.4)
Average rainy days	7	7	8	11	13	13	13	12	9	8	8	7	116
Average relative humidity (%)	80	79	78	75	77	76	77	79	82	84	84	79	79
Mean daily sunshine hours	4.7	4.9	6.1	7.5	8.6	10.2	10.3	8.5	6.1	4.8	3.8	4.5	6.7
Source: Climate-data.org

== History ==
The area was already settled in the Bronze Age through the Roman Era. Based on an entry in the Tabula Peutingeriana the ancient city of Noreia, capital of the Celtic kingdom Noricum, was thought to be near Murau in the late 18th and the 19th century. However, no archaeological evidence has been found so far.

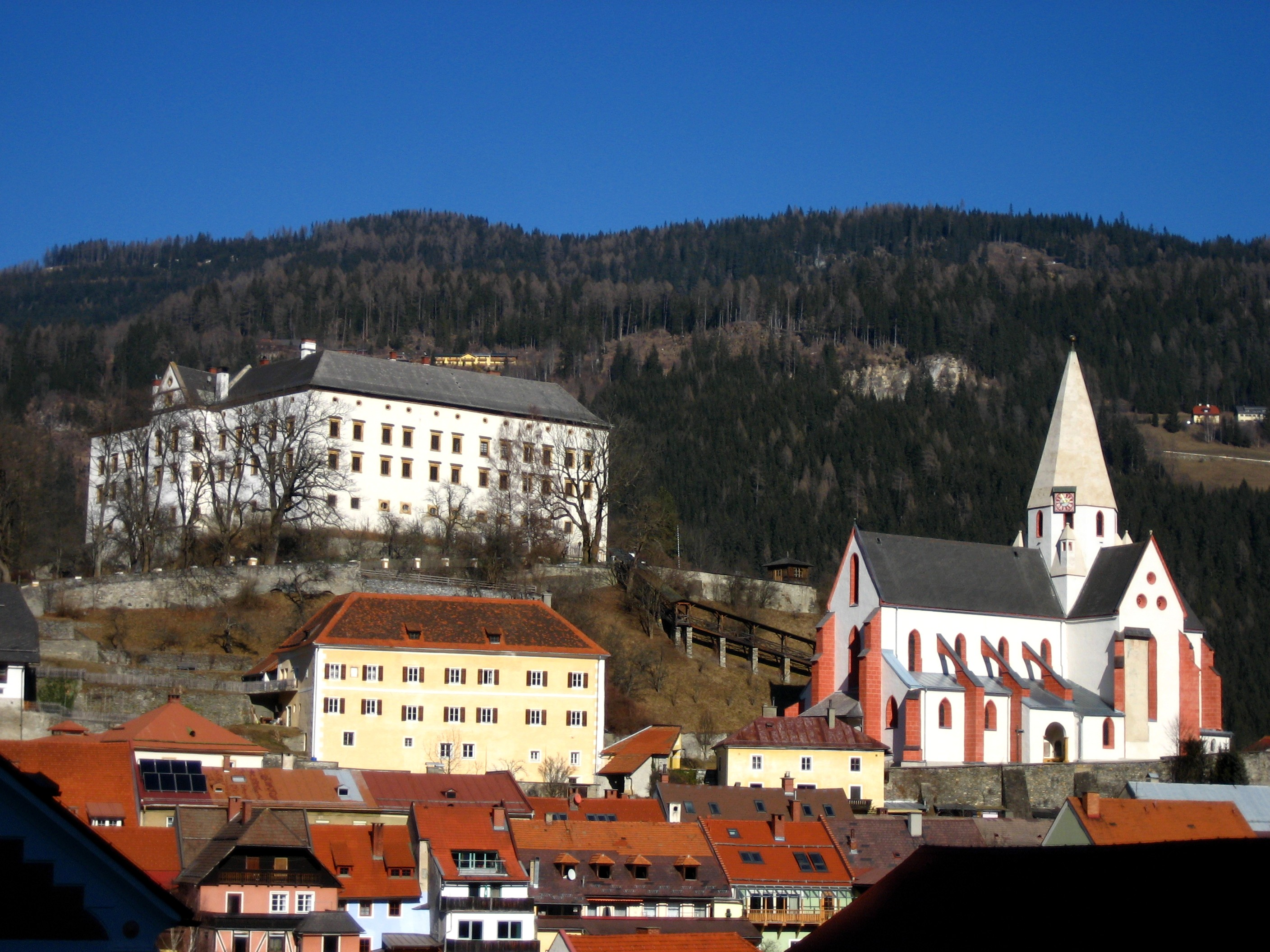
Murau Castle and St Matthew's parish church

Murowe itself, centre of the Styrian estates in the Mur valley held by the noble Liechtenstein family, was first mentioned in a 1250 deed. The famous minnesinger Ulrich von Liechtenstein (d. 1275) from nearby Frauenburg had a castle erected at Murau which was again demolished when the Bohemian king Ottokar II occupied the Styrian lands upon his victory at Kressenbrunn in 1260. Ulrich had to cede his estates to the king and was temporarily arrested in Moravia.

The Liechtenstein estates were restored, when Ottokar was defeated in the 1278 Battle on the Marchfeld. Ulrich's son Otto had the Gothic parish church of St Matthew's with its characteristic crossing tower built from 1284, it was consecrated by the Lavant bishop in 1296. The Murau citizens were vested with town privileges in 1298, whereafter the town was fortified and significantly enlarged.

From 1480 to 1490, the town was occupied by the Hungarian forces of King Matthias Corvinus. The Liechtensteins held Murau until the late 16th century. From 1623 onwards, it was a possession of the House of Schwarzenberg who had Murau Castle rebuilt in its present Renaissance style. The present owner is Karel Schwarzenberg.

During World War II a camp of the Wehrmacht armed forces was located here, in which captured British prisoners of war were held enthralled. At the end of the war in May 1945, local groups of resistance fighters freed eight remaining POWs and successfully led the approaching Red Army forces to believe that the town was already occupied by the British.

== Population ==
Historical population
Year	Pop.	±%
1869	1,293	—
1880	1,409	+9.0%
1890	1,377	−2.3%
1900	1,679	+21.9%
1910	1,807	+7.6%
1923	1,990	+10.1%
1934	2,117	+6.4%
1939	2,279	+7.7%
1951	2,838	+24.5%
1961	2,794	−1.6%
1971	2,711	−3.0%
1981	2,622	−3.3%
1991	2,443	−6.8%
2001	2,331	−4.6%
2011	2,096	−10.1%

== Events ==
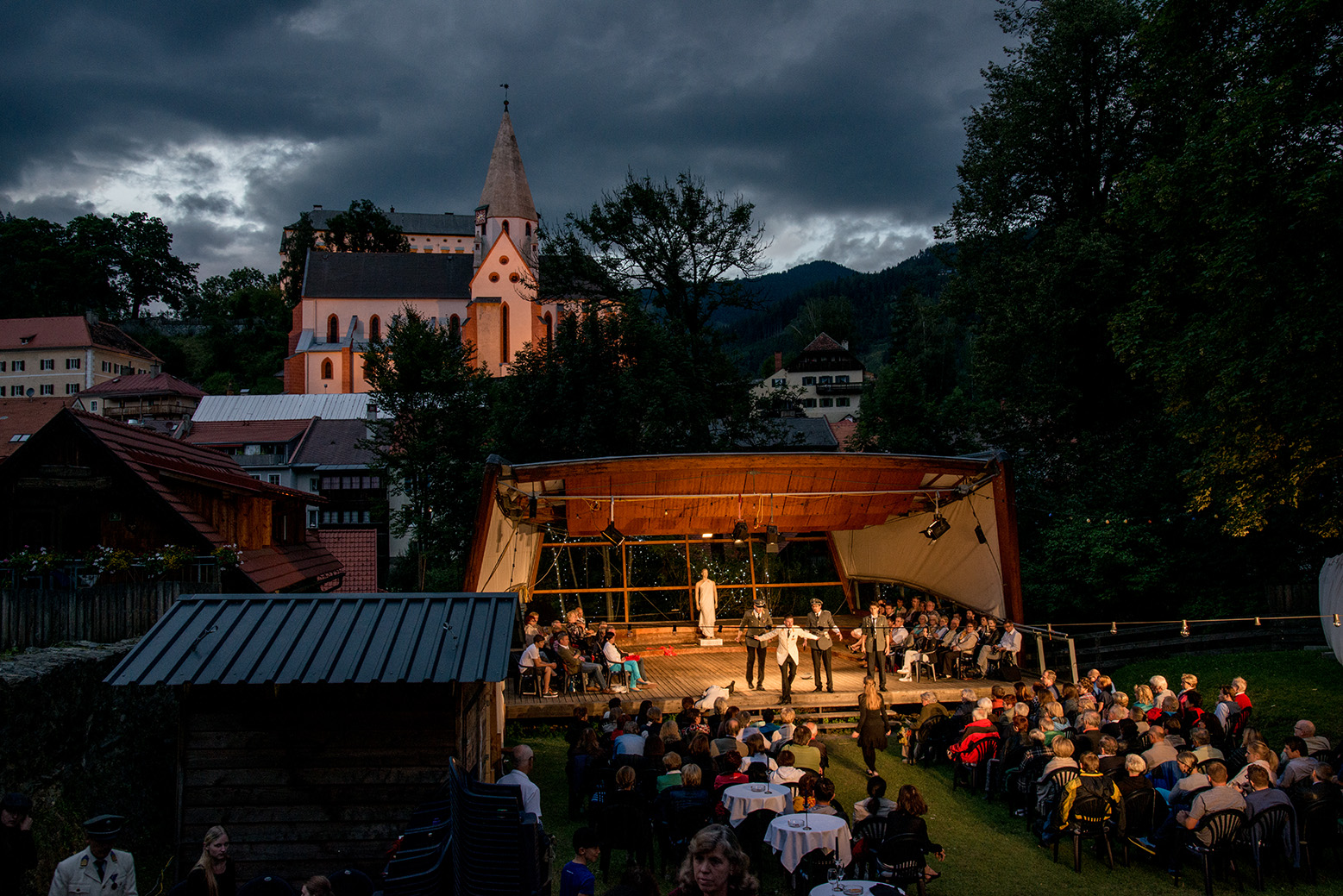
Julius Caesar by William Shakespeare performed in Murau, 2014

The Murtalbahn steam train is a historic part of the town, as well as one of its tourist attractions. Murau is also known for its annual Samson parades on August 15.

Since 2002, the annual festival Shakespeare in Styria presents productions of Shakespeare plays in the town's Festival Hall, in the Courtyard of the Murau Castle as well as at the Domenig Pavillon in the park of the town. The festival was founded in 2002 by British born theatre manager Nicholas Allen and Austrian writer Rudolph J. Wojta. Each year it presents another play performed by young actors and actresses from all over Europe directed by experienced British directors. In the early years of the festivals performances were in English. Since 2013 productions are performed in German and directed by Nicholas Allen and US-American sword-master Roberta Brown. Since the summer of 2016, the festival has been based at Saint Lambert's Abbey, some 14 kilometres from Murau and no performance have taken place in Murau.

== Politics ==
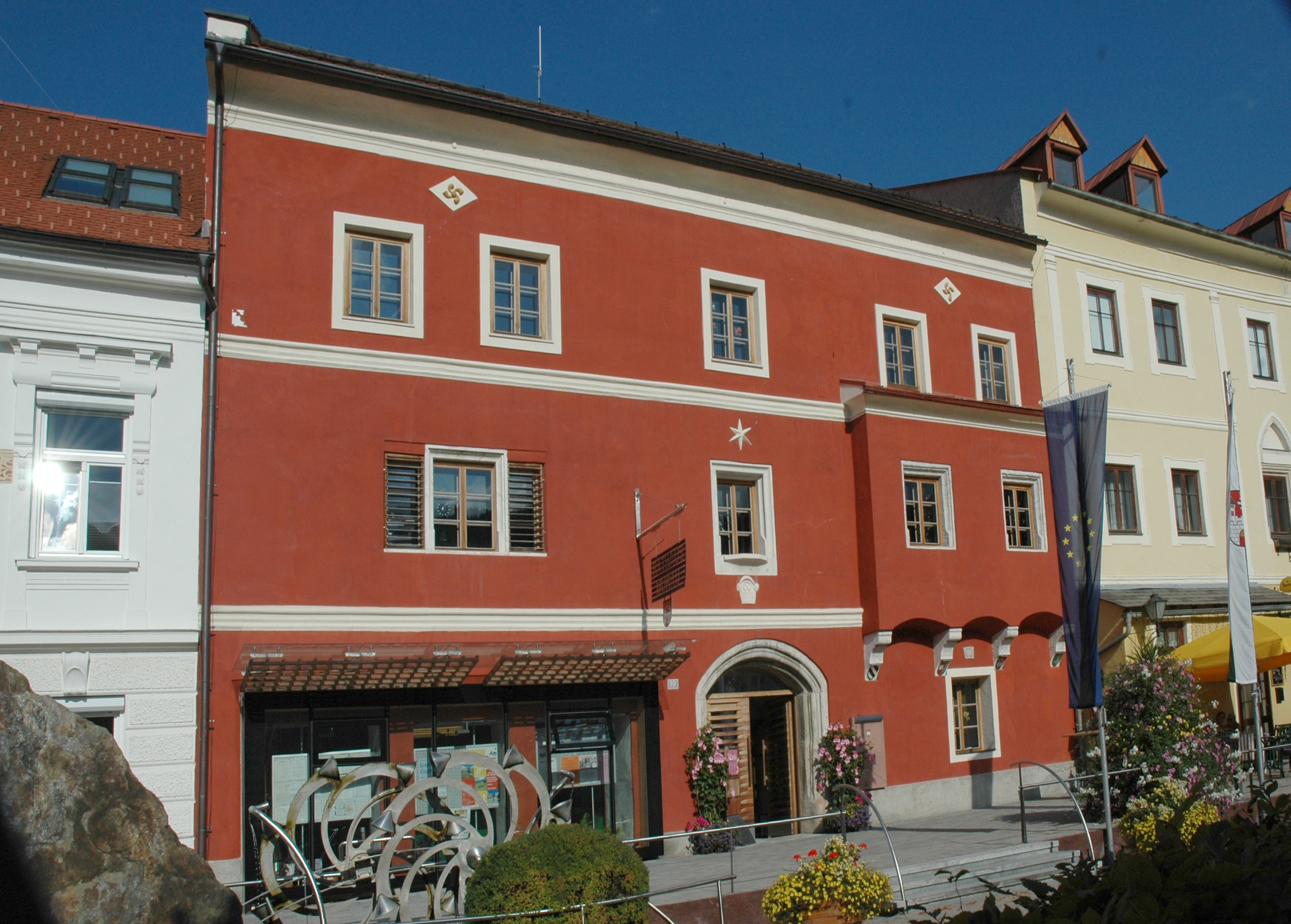
Town hall

Seats in the town's assembly (Stadtrat) as of 2015 local elections:

- Austrian People's Party (ÖVP): 15
- Social Democratic Party of Austria (SPÖ): 3
- Forum für Murau (Independent): 1
- The Greens – The Green Alternative: 1

=== Twin towns — sister cities ===
Murau is twinned with:

- Fagagna, Italy

== Notable people ==
- Willi Egger (1932–2008), Nordic combined skier and ski jumper
- Brunner & Brunner, brothers Charly Brunner (born 1955) and Jogl Brunner (born 1958) made up an Austrian pop duo
- Klaus Ofner (born 1968), Nordic combined skier, team bronze medalist at the 1992 Winter Olympics
