= Untertauern =

- Municipality
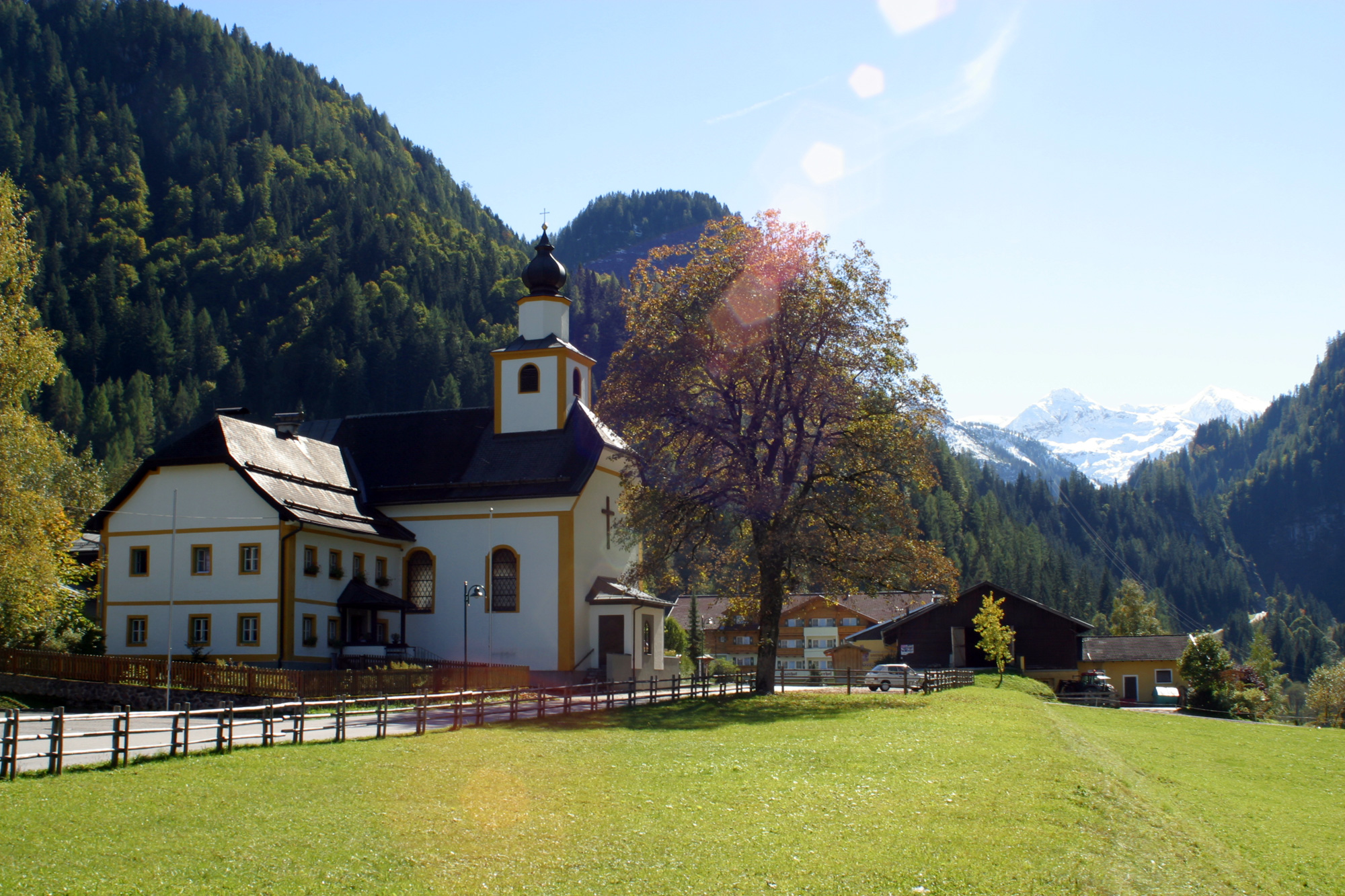
- St. Joseph's Church

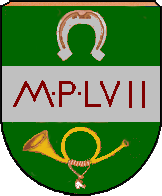
- Coat of arms

- Location within Austria
- Coordinates: 47°18′10″N 13°30′20″E
- Country: Austria
- State: Salzburg
- District: St. Johann im Pongau

Government
  - Mayor: Johann Habersatter (SPÖ)

Area
  - Total: 71.68 km^{2} (27.68 sq mi)
- Elevation: 1,010 m (3,310 ft)

Population (2018-01-01)
  - Total: 466
  - Density: 6.50/km^{2} (16.8/sq mi)
- Time zone: UTC+1 (CET)
  - Summer (DST): UTC+2 (CEST)
- Postal code: 5561
- Area code: 06455
- Vehicle registration: JO
- Website: www.untertauern.at

Untertauern is a municipality in the district of St. Johann im Pongau in the Austrian state of Salzburg.

== Geography ==
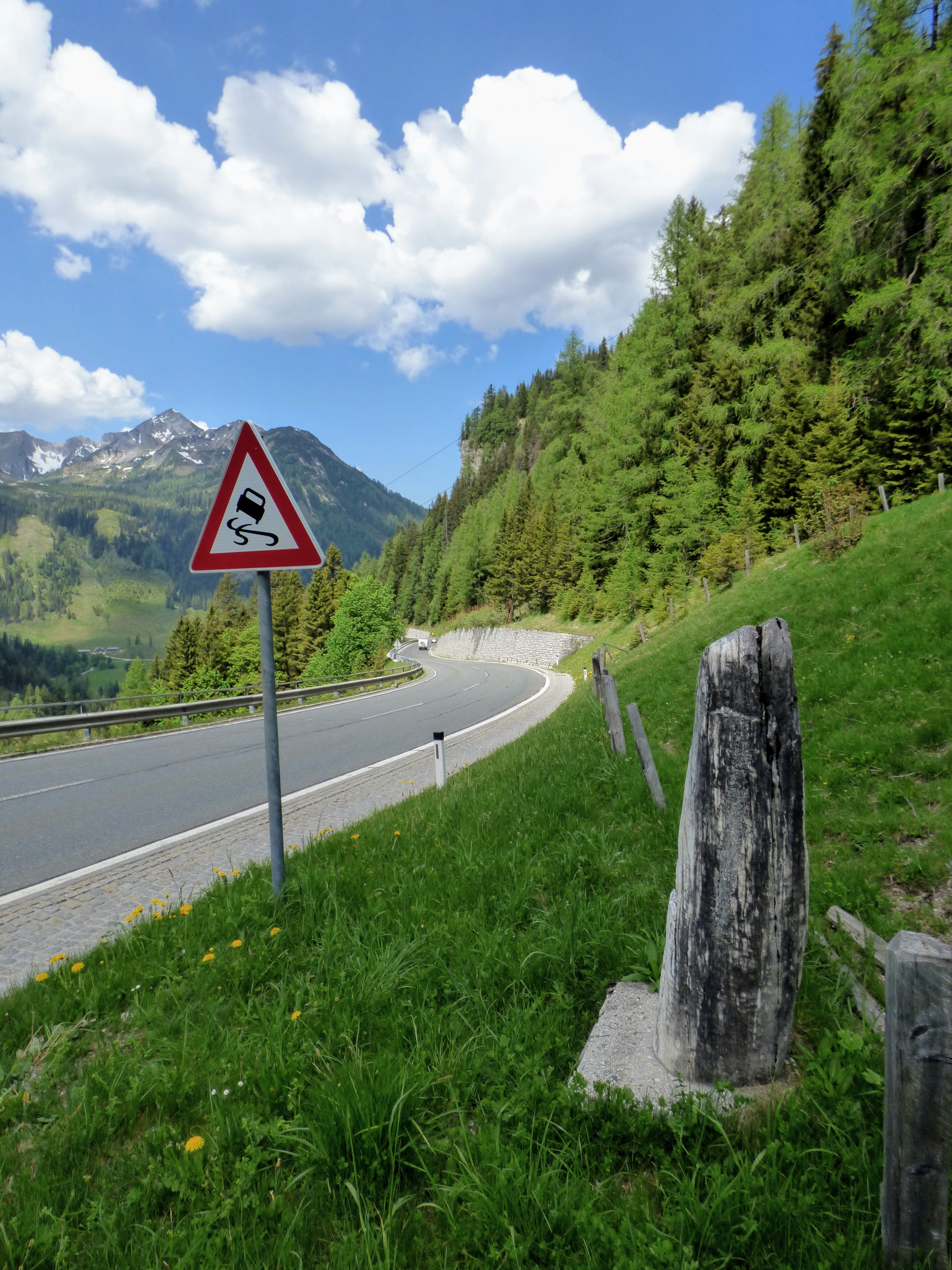
Pass road with Roman milestone

Untertauern is situated in the Salzburg Pongau region in the valley of the Northern Taurach, a right tributary of the Enns river, about 10 km (6.2 mi) south of Radstadt. The parallel road runs up to Radstädter Tauern Pass, separating the Radstadt Tauern range in the west from the Schladming Tauern in the east. Here the Obertauern ski resort stretches to neighbouring Tweng in the Salzburg Lungau region.

== History ==
The road up to Radstädter Tauern Pass was already used by Celtic Taurisci tribes about 200 BC. Later a Roman road led across the Alpine crest, which was rebuilt under the rule of Emperor Septimius Severus (193–211 AD). The cemetery of present-day Obertauern, laid out in the 16th century, probably was the site of a mansio stopping place denoted as In Alpe on ancient maps.

In medieval times, the pass road regained its strategical importance as a connection between the Pongau and Lungau regions of the Prince-Archbishopric of Salzburg. Since 1975, the main traffic runs on the parallel Tauern Autobahn through the Tauern Road Tunnel.

== Politics ==
Seats in the municipal assembly (Gemeinderat) as of 2014 local elections:

- Social Democratic Party of Austria (SPÖ): 3
- Austrian People's Party (ÖVP): 3
- GFUO (independent): 3
