= Plattenspitze =

Plattenspitze or Plattenspitz may refer to the following mountains in central Europe:

- Plattenspitz (2,579 m above the sea) in the canton of St. Gallen, Switzerland
- Plattenspitze (Allgäu Alps) (2,489 m above sea level (AA)) in the Hornbach chain of the Allgäu Alps, Tyrol, Austria
- Plattenspitze (Karwendel) (2,492 m above sea level (AA)) in the Karwendel mountains, Tyrol, Austria
- Plattenspitze (Schladming Tauern) (2,294 m above sea level (AA)) in the Schladming Tauern, Salzburg, Austria
- Plattenspitze (Ortler Alps) (3,422 m s.l.m.) in the Ortler Alps, South Tyrol, Italy

== See also ==
- Plattspitzen
