= Weißeck (disambiguation) =

The Weißeck is the highest mountain in the Radstadt Tauern range in the Alps.

Weißeck may also refer to:

- the German name of the Polish town of Wysoka between 1942 and 1945

== See also ==
- Weissbeck
