= Plattenspitze (Schladming Tauern) =

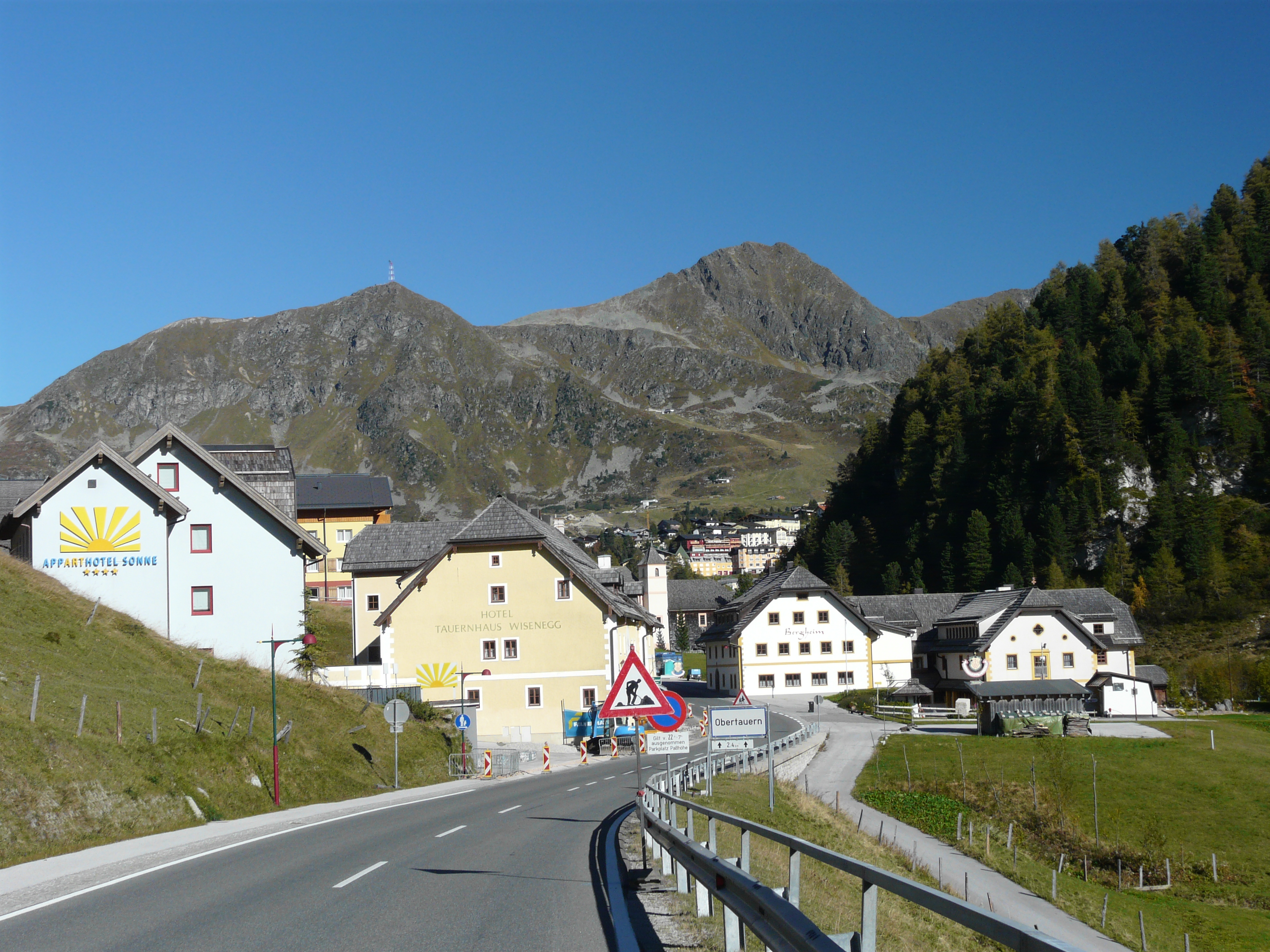

Highest point
- Elevation: 2,294 m (AA) (7,526 ft)
- Coordinates: 47°15′21″N 13°34′45″E

Geography
- Location within Austria
- Location: Salzburg, Austria
- Parent range: Schladming Tauern

The Plattenspitze or Plattenspitz is a mountain, 2,294 metres high (another source 2,293 m) above the village of Obertauern and on the territory of the municipality of Tweng, Austria. Its summit lies within the Schladming Tauern range and is usually traversed by climbers making for the Gamskarlspitze (2,411 m) to the south.

Neighbouring peaks are the Hundskogel (2,238 m) and Gamskarlspitze (2,411 m).

On top of the Plattenspitze is a 38-metre-high (125 ft) tower which acts as a passive repeater.

One of the lifts of the Obertauern ski region, the Plattenkarbahn runs up the mountain to the cirque beneath the summit.
