= Northern Taurach =

Northern Taurach Nördliche Taurach
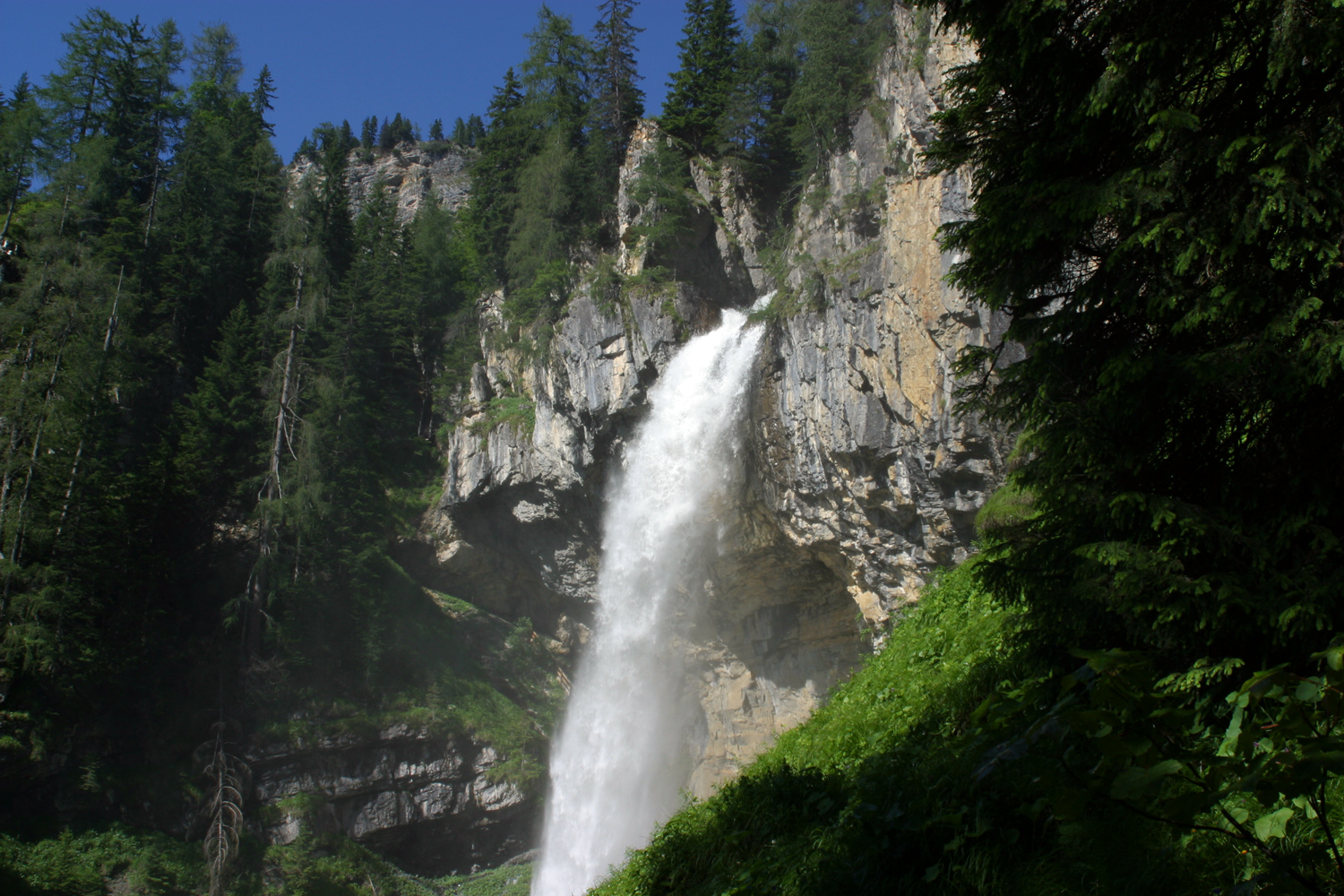
- The Johannesfall above the Gnadenalm

Location
- Country: Austria
- State: Salzburg

Physical characteristics
- Source
  - location: Origin: Confluence of the Grünwald Taurach and Hundsfeld Taurach in Obertauern
  - coordinates: 47°15′04″N 13°32′44″E
- Mouth
  - location: Near Radstadt into the Enns
  - coordinates: 47°23′07″N 13°29′38″E
- Length: 20 km (12 mi)
- Basin size: 88 km^{2} (34 sq mi)

Basin features
- Progression: Enns→ Danube→ Black Sea

The Northern Taurach (German: Nördliche Taurach), also called the Pongau Taurach (German: Pongauer Taurach), is a river of the state Salzburg in Austria. Its drainage basin is 88 km^{2} (34 sq mi).

The Northern Taurach is a right-hand tributary of the Enns near Radstadt. It is one of the two rivers named Taurach, both of which rise near the Radstädter Tauern Pass, but drain in opposite directions – the other is called Southern Taurach. The two valleys, which descend from the Tauern Pass, are also both called Taurach Valley (Taurachtal). Together they link the Enns valley to the Mur valley in north–south direction.

The Northern Taurach is about 20 kilometres (12 mi) long and thus considerably shorter than the Southern Taurach, but has a greater height difference from source to mouth of over 900 metres (3,000 ft).
