= Mosermandl =

Mountain in Austria

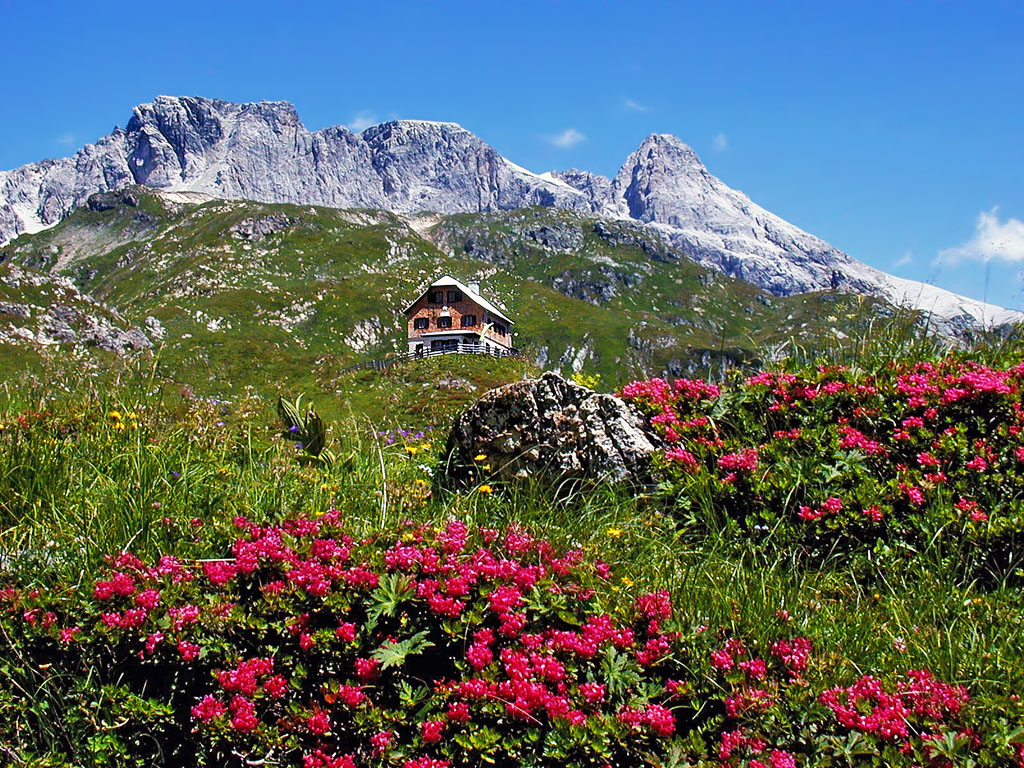
- Mosermandl from the southwest

Highest point
- Elevation: 2,680 m (8,790 ft)
- Prominence: 544 m (1,785 ft)
- Coordinates: 47°12′08″N 13°23′54″E

Geography
- Location within Alps
- Location: Salzburg, Austria
- Parent range: Radstadt Tauern

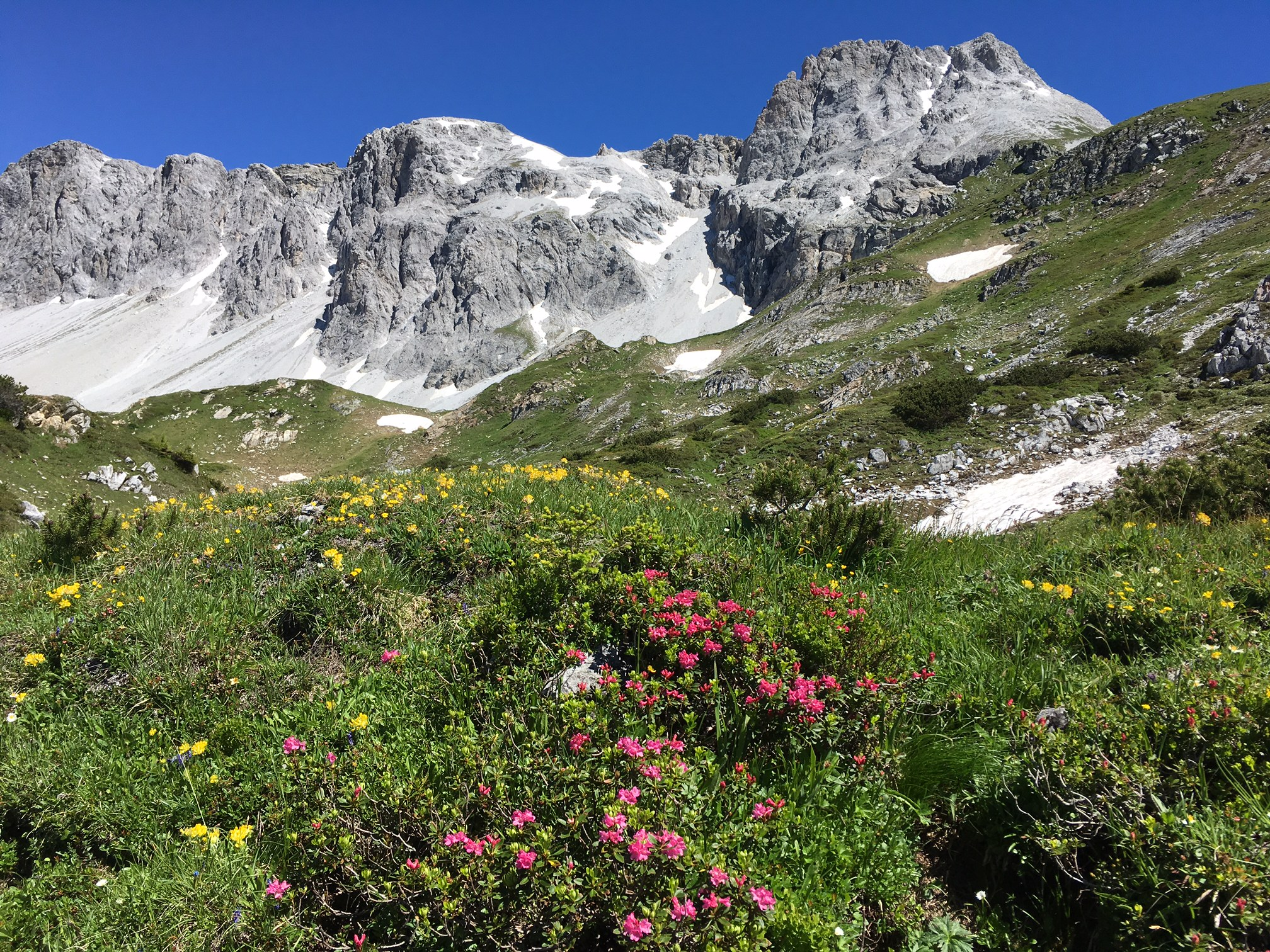
viewed from the Riedingtal Nature Reserve

Mosermandl (2,680 m) is a mountain of the Radstadt Tauern in Salzburg, Austria.

One of the main peaks of the Radstadt Tauern, Mosermandl is a limestone mountain topped with a karst plateau. It is usually climbed from the southern Zederhaus side and provides fine views towards the High Tauern towards the south and west.
