= Greim (Wölzer Tauern) =

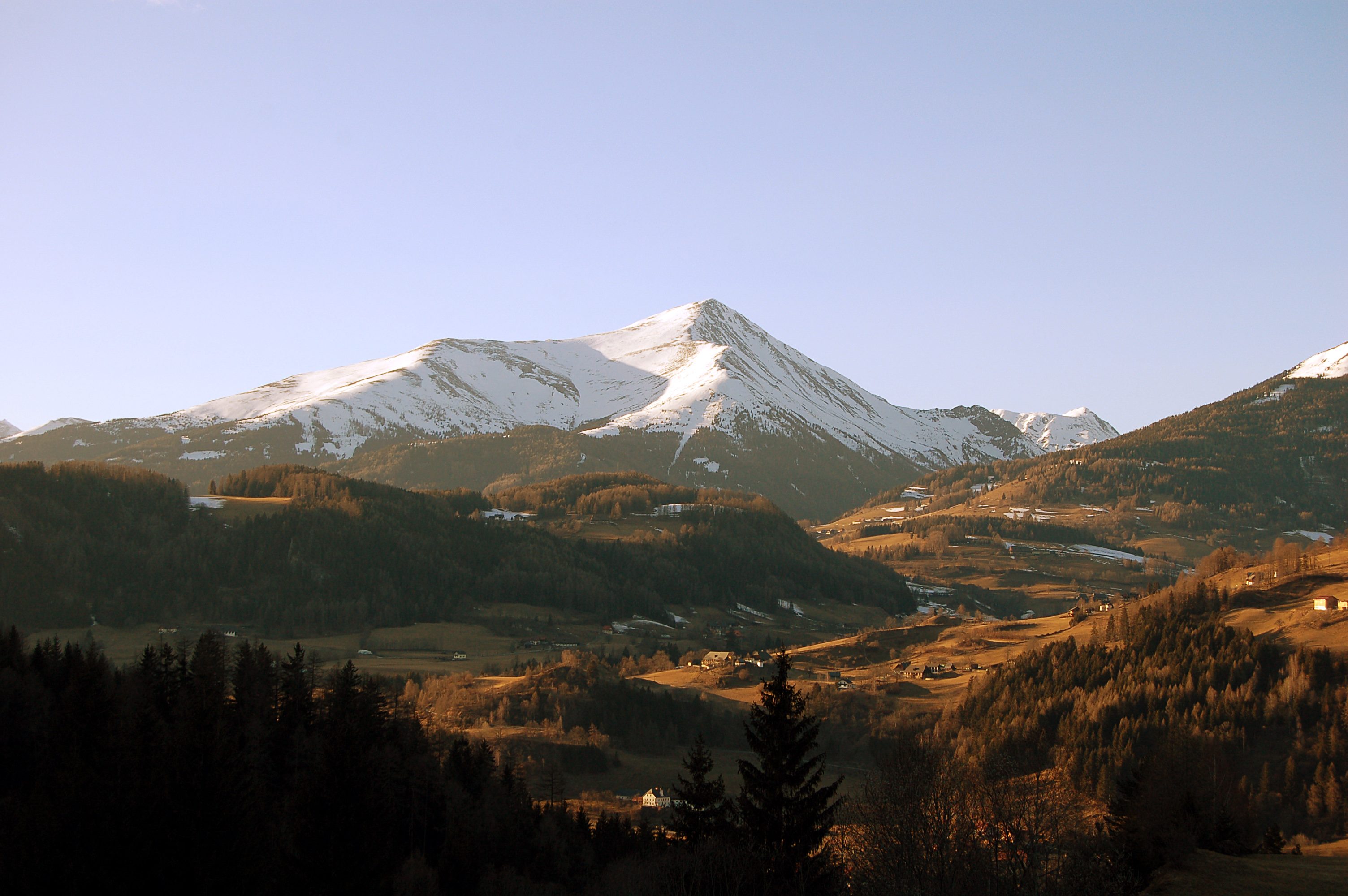
- Greim viewed from the south-east

Highest point
- Elevation: 2,474 m (8,117 ft)
- Coordinates: 47°14′51″N 14°09′05″E

Geography
- Location: Styria, Austria
- Parent range: Wölzer Tauern

Greim, at 2,474 m (8,117 ft), is a mountain in the Wölzer Tauern, part of the Niedere Tauern, in Styria, Austria. After the Rettelkirchspitze, it is the second highest elevation of the Wölzer Tauern.

The ascent is relatively easy, especially from the south side. Starting at the Greimhütte 1,680 m (5,512 ft), the top can be reached in 2 hours on a marked trail.

The Greimhütte can be reached by car from Sankt Peter am Kammersberg.
