= Rottenmann and Wölz Tauern =

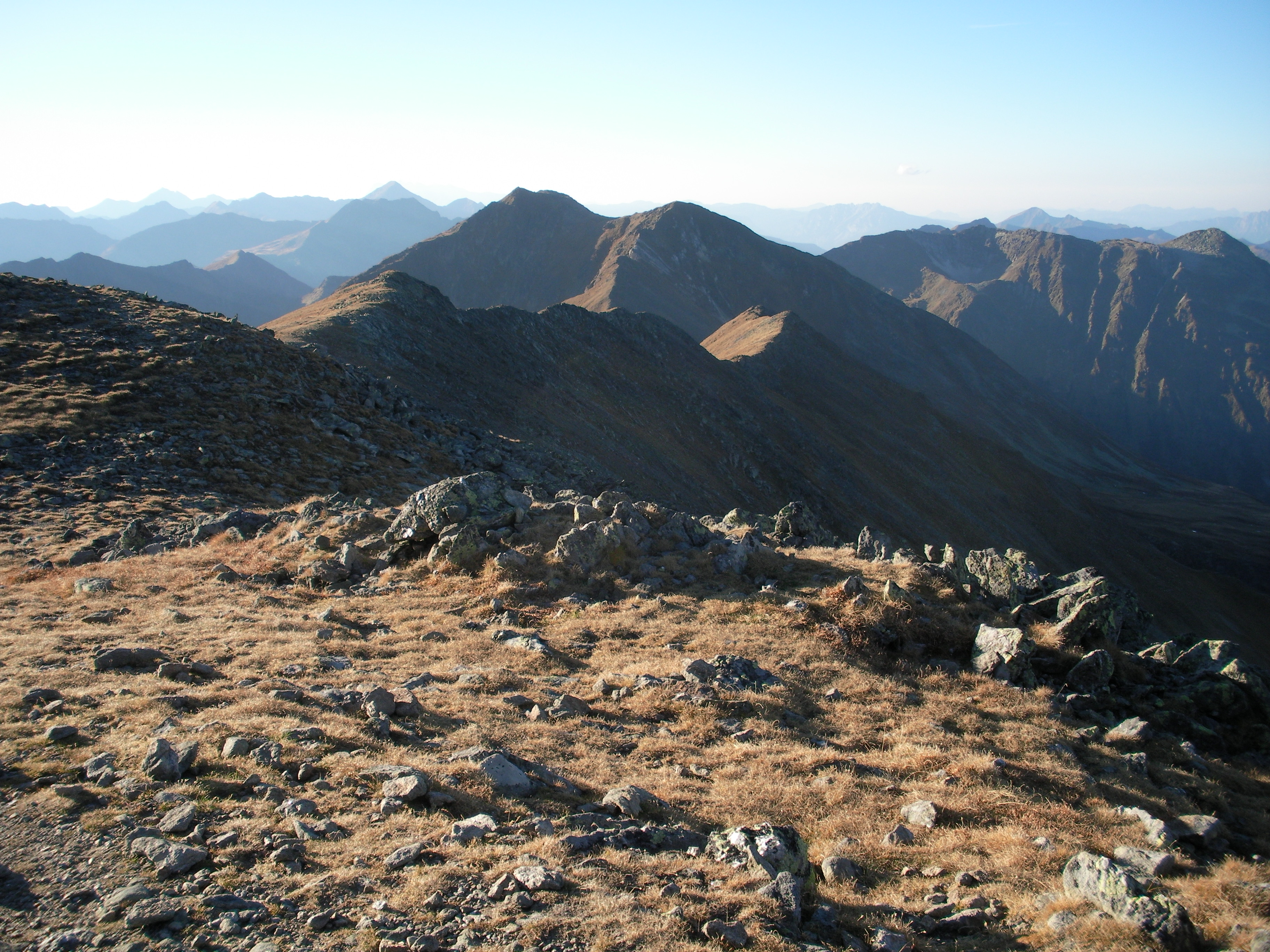
- The Rettlkirchspitze, the highest summit in the range.

Highest point
- Peak: Rettlkirchspitze
- Elevation: 2,475 m above sea level (AA)

Geography
- Location within Alps
- State(s): Styria, Austria
- Range coordinates: 47°15′36″N 14°07′39″E
- Parent range: Low Tauern

The Rottenmann and Wölz Tauern (German: Rottenmanner und Wölzer Tauern) are a subrange of the Austrian Central Alps within the Eastern Alps. Together with the Radstadt Tauern, the Schladming Tauern and the Seckau Tauern the Rottenmann and Wölz Tauern form the major range known as the Low Tauern. The mountains are located in Austria in the federal state of Styria.

== Peaks ==
- Rettlkirchspitze (2,475 m),
- Greim (2,474 m),
- Großer Bösenstein (2,448 m),
- Schoberspitze (2,423 m),
- Kleiner Bösenstein (2,395 m),
- Drei Stecken (2,382 m),
- Hochweberspitze (2,370 m),
- Hochhaide (2,363 m),
- Hohenwart (2,363 m),
- Sonntagskarspitze (2,350 m),
- Gumpeneck (2,226 m).

== Neighbouring mountain ranges ==
The Rottenmann Tauern and Wölz Tauern border on the following other mountain ranges of the Alps:

- Totes Gebirge (to the north)
- Ennstal Alps (to the northeast)
- Seckau Tauern (to the east)
- Lavanttal Alps (to the southeast)
- Nock Mountains (to the southwest)
- Schladming Tauern (to the west)
- Dachstein Mountains (to the northwest)

== Literature ==
- Hans Hödl: Bergerlebnis Wölzer, Rottenmanner, Triebener Tauern und Seckauer Alpen. Die Wege zu den Gipfeln, Almen, Bergseen und Hütten. Steirische Verlagsgesellschaft, Graz, 2008, ISBN 978-3-85489-149-9.
