= Zederhaus =

- Municipality
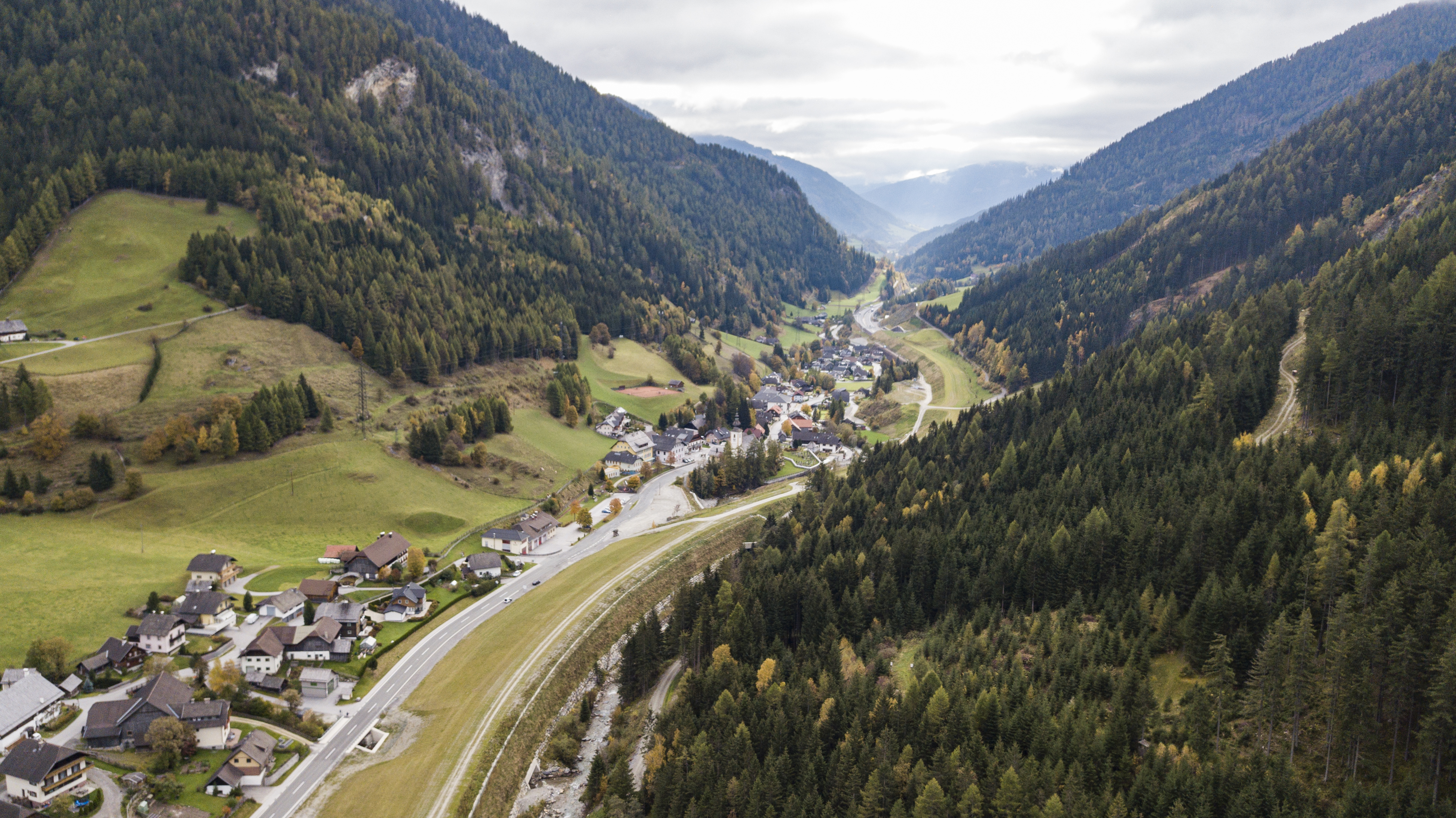
- Zederhaus

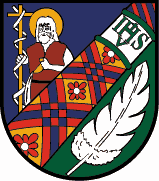
- Coat of arms

- Location within Austria
- Coordinates: 47°09′N 13°31′E
- Country: Austria
- State: Salzburg
- District: Tamsweg

Government
  - Mayor: Thomas Kößler (ÖVP)

Area
  - Total: 130.55 km^{2} (50.41 sq mi)
- Elevation: 1,205 m (3,953 ft)

Population (2018-01-01)
  - Total: 1,196
  - Density: 9.161/km^{2} (23.73/sq mi)
- Time zone: UTC+1 (CET)
  - Summer (DST): UTC+2 (CEST)
- Postal code: 5584
- Area code: 06478
- Vehicle registration: TA
- Website: www.zederhaus.gv.at

Zederhaus is a municipality of the Tamsweg District in the Austrian state of Salzburg.

== Geography ==
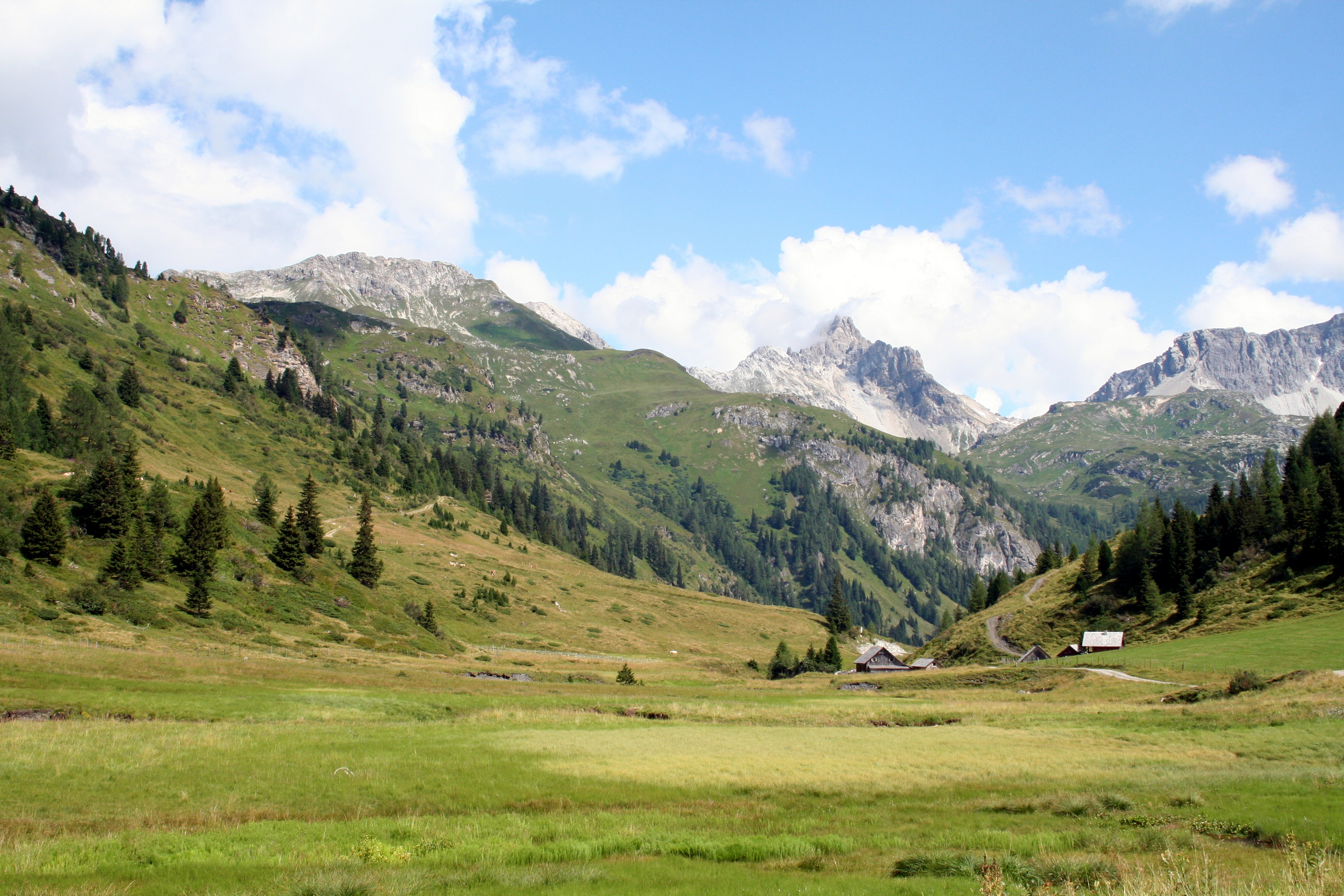
Alpine pastures in the Rieding high valley

The Zederhaus Valley is located in the northwestern part of the Salzburg Lungau region, on the southern slopes of the Lower Tauern mountain range, reaching up to Mt Weißeck at 2,711 m (8,894 ft). The crest of the Radstadt Tauern in the north separates it from the Pongau region. From the Rieding high valley, today a protected area, the Zederhaus creek flows southeastwards, reaching the upper Mur River at neighbouring Sankt Michael. The smaller village stream passes several historic watermills.

The sparsely settled municipal area, the largest in the Tamsweg District, comprises the cadastral communities of Lamm, Rothenwand, Wald, and Zederhaus proper.

The valley today is characterised by the construction of the Tauern Autobahn in the 1970s, a major north-south road connection which is part of the European route E55. The south portal of the Tauern Road Tunnel, one of the longest in Austria, is located near the Zederhaus centre. A junction leads on the motorway in the Salzburg direction. Several attempts have been made to reduce emissions by the construction of extended noise protection walls; currently an overhead noise barrier is built along a 900 m (3,000 ft) section near the Zederhaus village centre.

== History ==
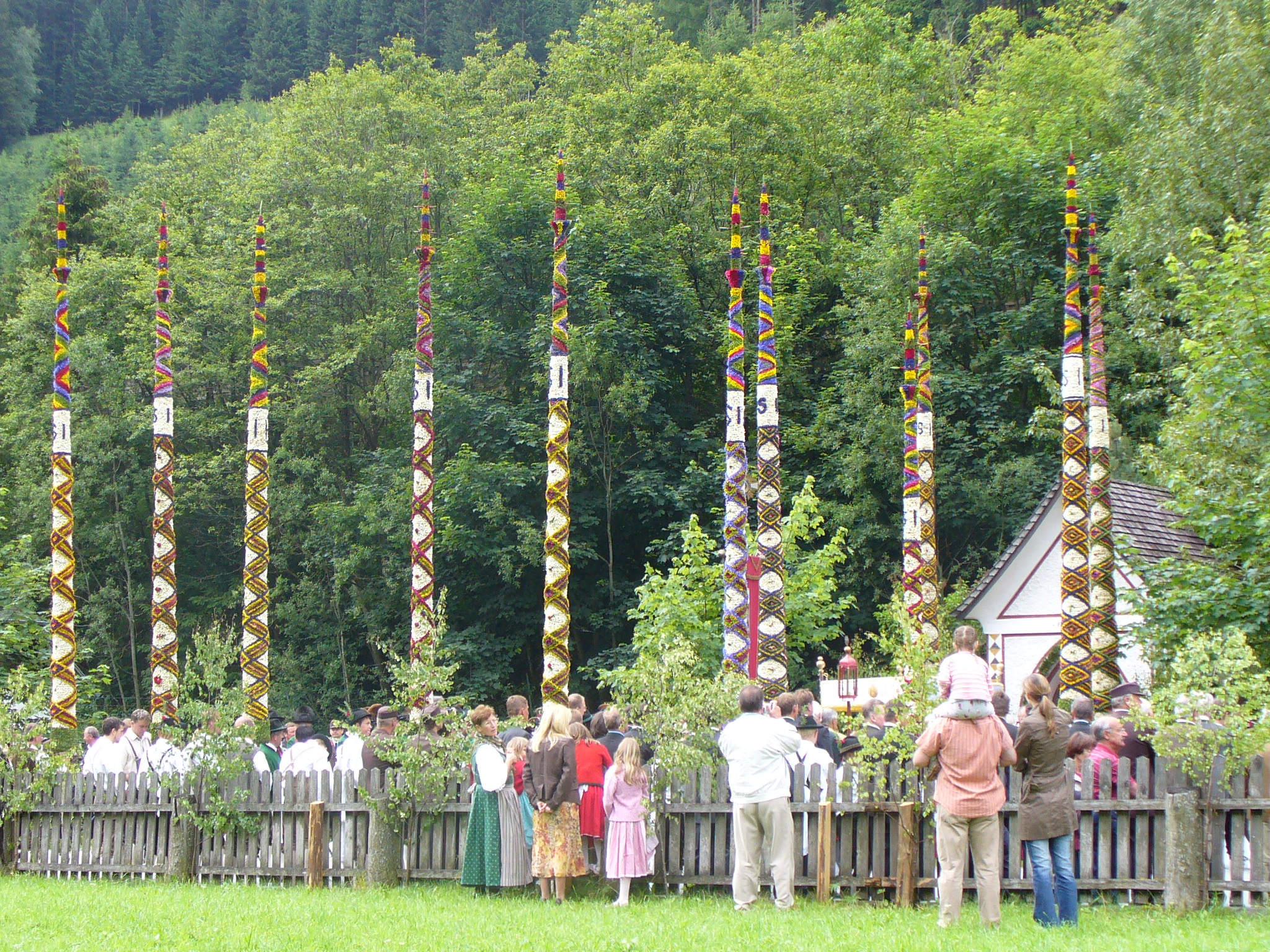
Prangstangen procession

Zederhaus shares the history of the rustic Lungau region, once part of the Roman Noricum province. The remote area possibly was not settled until the 14th century. For centuries, the estates belonged to the Prince-Archbishopric of Salzburg until its secularisation in 1803.

A local chapel was first mentioned in a 1445 deed, then a filial of St Rupert Church in nearby Weißpriach. Since 1813 Saint John's at Zederhaus is a parish in its own right.

The local peasants relied on seasonal mountain pasture farming, while today many inhabitants are commuter employees. A local custom at least since the 17th century is the annual procession with Prangstangen, up to 8 m (26 ft) high wooden poles which are decorated with flowers and carried by local bachelors on St John's Day, June 24 into the church.

== Politics ==
Seats in the municipal assembly (Gemeinderat) as of 2014 elections:

- Austrian People's Party (ÖVP): 8
- Freedom Party of Austria (FPÖ): 4
- Social Democratic Party of Austria (SPÖ): 1

== Notable people ==
- Heimo Pfeifenberger (born 1966), football player
