= Großer Bösenstein =

Mountain in Styria, Austria

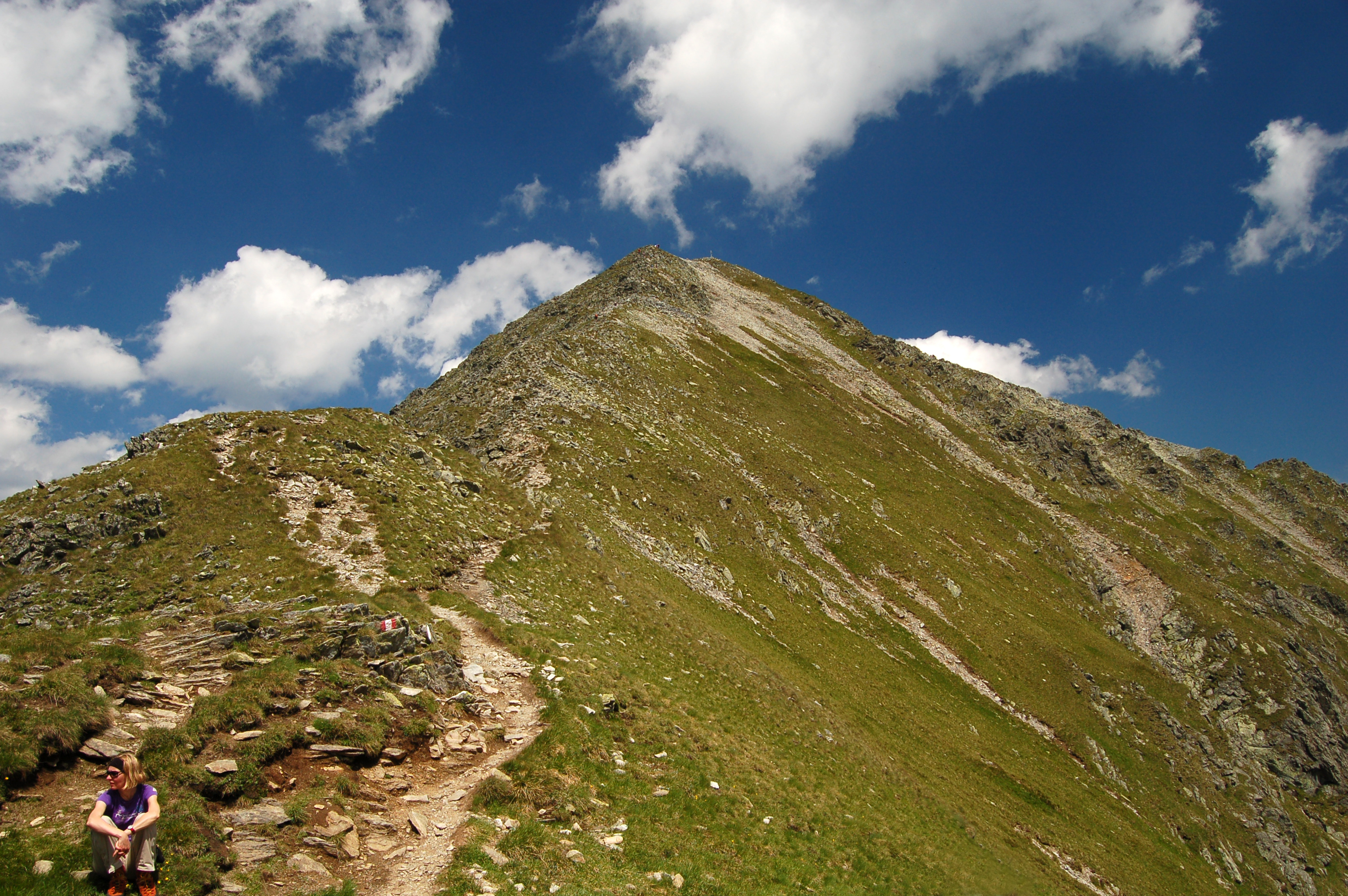
- Großer Bösenstein

Highest point
- Elevation: 2,448 m (8,031 ft)
- Prominence: 634 m (2,080 ft)
- Coordinates: 47°27′N 14°24′E

Geography
- Location within Alps
- Location: Styria, Austria
- Parent range: Niedere Tauern

Großer Bösenstein (2,448 m) is a mountain of the Lower Tauern in Styria, Austria. It is located near the village of Hohentauern, which is the starting point for most climbs, and is the third highest mountain of the Rottenmann and Wölz Tauern sub-range. It is a hiking peak, and the view from the summit provides an excellent view of the far Eastern Alps, including Grimming and the Totes Gebirge.
