= Weißeck =

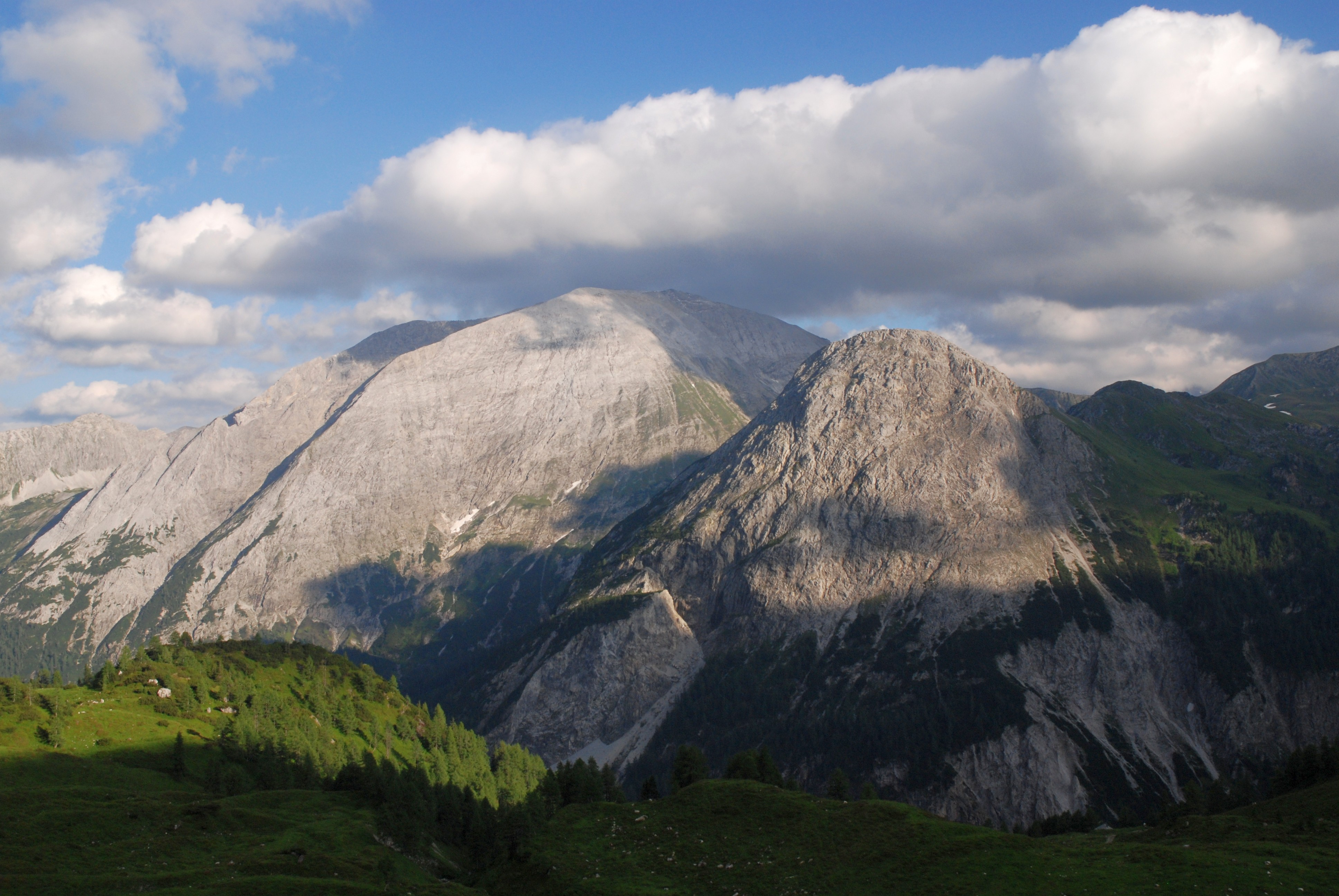
- The Weißeck and the Riedingspitze

Highest point
- Elevation: 2,711 m (AA) (8,894 ft)
- Prominence: 2,711-2,260 m ↓ Murtörl
- Isolation: 7.4 km → Kölnbreinspitze
- Coordinates: 47°09′46″N 13°23′38″E

Geography
- Location within Austria
- Location: Salzburg, Austria
- Parent range: Radstadt Tauern

Geology
- Rock age: Ladinian
- Mountain type: Wetterstein dolomite

Climbing
- Normal route: Western crest (mostly easy)

The Weißeck (2,711 m (AA)) is the highest mountain in the Radstadt Tauern range in Austria and is popular, both as a ski touring destination in winter and a climbing peak in summer. It gets its name (which means "white corner") from the mighty block of light-coloured Wetterstein dolomite of which the mountain is made.

The summit of the Weißeck is located on the municipal boundary between Muhr, in the national park, and Zederhaus, in the nature park.

Bases for tours to the Weißeck are, on one side, the Riedingtal valley in Zederhaus, and, on the other, the Stickler Hut (1,752 m) in the upper Mur valley. The normal route from the Rieding gap along the western ridge to the top is signed and only requires a little sure-footedness, but is generally an easy climbing grade.

There are several legends about the Weißeck. The best-known is about the Weißeck Dog. The Weißeck is also popular with mineral collectors; since time immemorial it has been a well-known site for finds of fluorite.

== Routes ==
=== Summer ===
- Riedingtal: Königalm – Zauneralm – Rieding gap (Riedingscharte) – Weißeck (ca. 1,050 metre height difference)
- Upper Mur valley: Stickler Hut – Rieding gap – Weißeck (ca. 950 metre height difference)

=== Winter ===
- Wald in Zederhaus: Gspandlalm – Höllgraben – in der Hölle – Weißeck (ca. 1,400 height difference)

== Literature ==
- Peter Holl: Alpenvereinsführer Niedere Tauern, Bergverlag Rother, 7th ed., Munich, 2005. ISBN 3-7633-1267-6
