= Radstädter Tauern Pass =

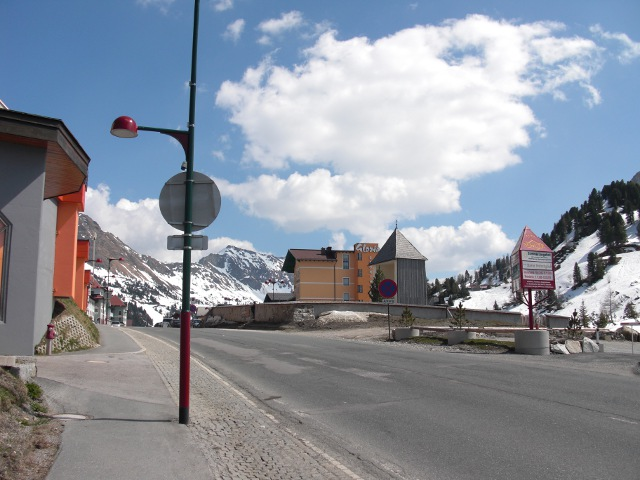
- Pass height in Obertauern

- Location within Alps
- Elevation: 1,738 metres (5,702 ft)
- Traversed by: Bundesstraße B 99

Third Approach
- Location: Austria
- Range: Niedere Tauern
- Coordinates: 47°14′53″N 13°33′33″E

Radstädter Tauern Pass (el. 1,738 m [5,702 ft]) is a high mountain pass in the Austrian state of Salzburg, connecting the town of Radstadt in the Pongau region with Mauterndorf in Lungau.

== Geography ==
The pass separates the Radstadt Tauern in the west and the Schladming Tauern in the east, both part of the Niedere Tauern mountain range in the Central Eastern Alps. It is crossed by the Katschberg Straße (B 99) road, which runs from Bischofshofen on the Salzach River via Radtstadt in the Enns Valley to Sankt Michael im Lungau on the Mur River. From Sankt Michael it leads further southwards across the Katschberg Pass to Spittal an der Drau in Carinthia. A little to the west and about 600 metres (2,000 ft) lower, the parallel Tauern Autobahn (A 10) crosses the Radstadt Tauern in the Tauern Road Tunnel.

The road probably was already used by the Celtic Taurisci tribe. It was rebuilt as a Roman road during the rule of Emperor Septimius Severus from 193 onwards, leading from Iuvavum (Salzburg) in the Noricum province across the main chain of the Alps to Aquileia in Italy.

At the pass is the Obertauern ski resort.

== See also ==
- List of highest paved roads in Europe
- List of mountain passes
