= Radstadt Tauern =

Subrange of the Central Eastern Alps in Austria

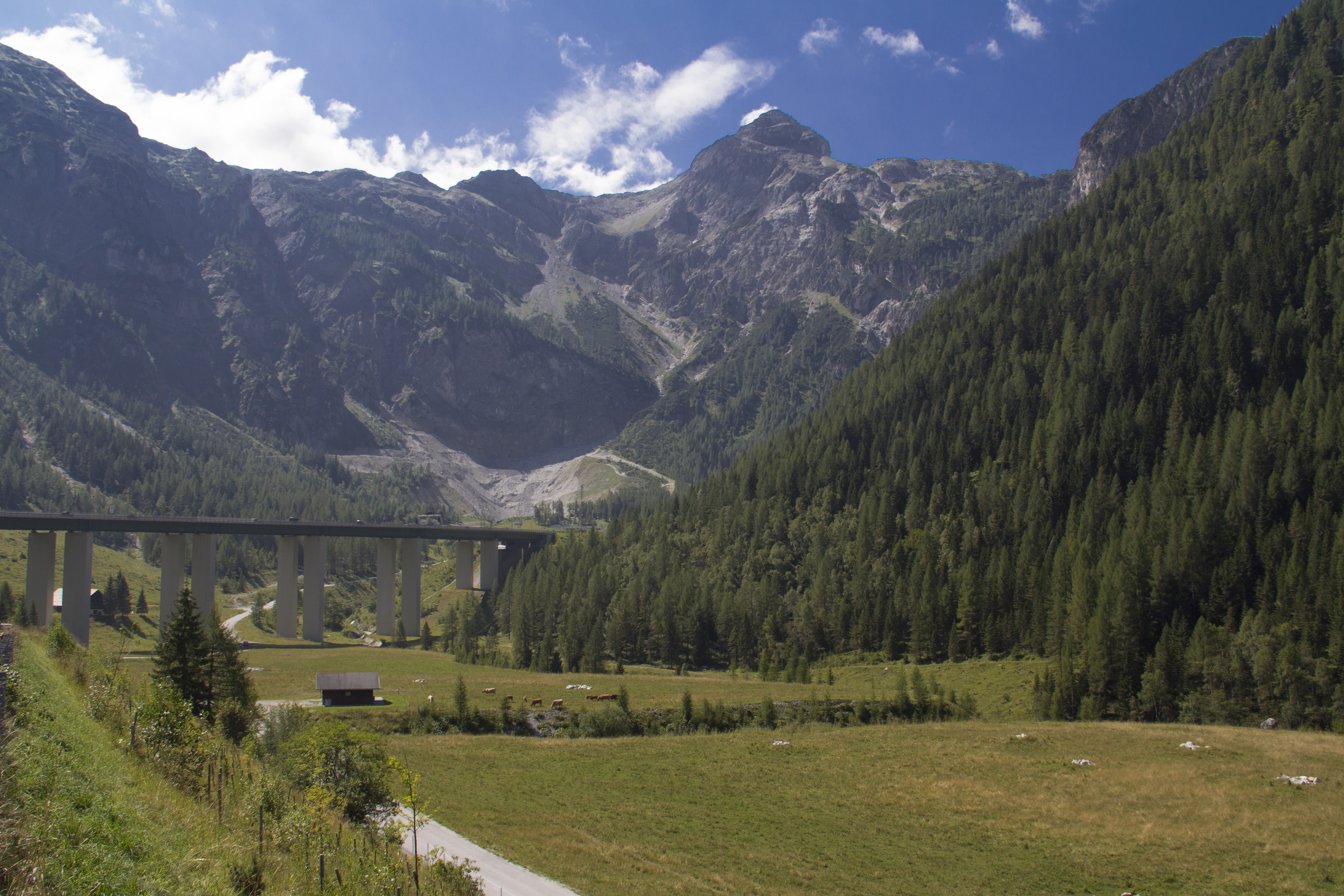
- Tauern Autobahn near Flachau

Highest point
- Peak: Weißeck
- Elevation: 2,711 m (8,894 ft)
- Coordinates: 47°09′46″N 13°23′38″E

Geography
- Location within Austria
- Country: Austria
- State: Salzburg
- Range coordinates: 47°09′00″N 13°23′00″E
- Parent range: Central Eastern Alps; Low Tauern

The Radstadt Tauern (German: Radstädter Tauern) are a subrange of the Central Eastern Alps in Austria. Together with the Schladming Tauern, the Rottenmann and Wölz Tauern and the Seckau Tauern the Radstadt Tauern form the major range of mountains known as the Low Tauern. The mountains are found in the southeast of the Austrian state of Salzburg, between the upper reaches of the Enns and Mur rivers.

== Geography ==
=== Location ===
The Radstadt Tauern form the westernmost part of the Low Tauern range. They are bounded to the southwest by the High Tauern, to the northwest by the Salzburg Pongau region, and to the east by the Schladming Tauern. Their name is derived from the historic town of Radstadt in the Enns valley.

=== Neighbouring ranges ===
The Radstadt Tauern border on the following other mountain ranges of the Alps:

- Schladming Tauern (to the east)
- Nock Mountains (Gurktal Alps; to the southeast)
- Ankogel Group (High Tauern; to the west)
- Salzburg Slate Alps (to the north)

=== Boundary ===
According to the Alpine Club classification of the Eastern Alps (AVE), the mountains are bounded by the following line, in a clockwise direction: Wagrainer Bach from its confluence with the Salzach – Wagrainer Höhe – Litzlingbach to its confluence with the Enns – Enns to Radstadt – Northern Taurach valley – Obertauern – Southern Taurach valley – Mauterndorf – Neuseß – Mur – Murtörl Pass – Kreealpenbach – Großarlbach to its confluence with the Salzach – Salzach to its confluence with the Wagrainer Bach.

=== Communications ===
The eastern edge of the Radstadt Tauern is crossed by the Radstädter Tauern Pass (1,738 m above sea level (AA)) and, since 1975, by the Tauern Road Tunnel of the Tauern Autobahn (A10).

In the north and south of the range, the Enns Valley and Mur Valley Railway lines, as well as parallel federal roads (Bundesstraßen) run along the upper Enns and upper Mur valleys.

=== Peaks ===
Its highest summits are the Weißeck (2,711 m above sea level (AA)), the Hochfeind (2,687 m above sea level (AA)) and the Mosermandl (2,680 m above sea level (AA)).

== Tourism ==
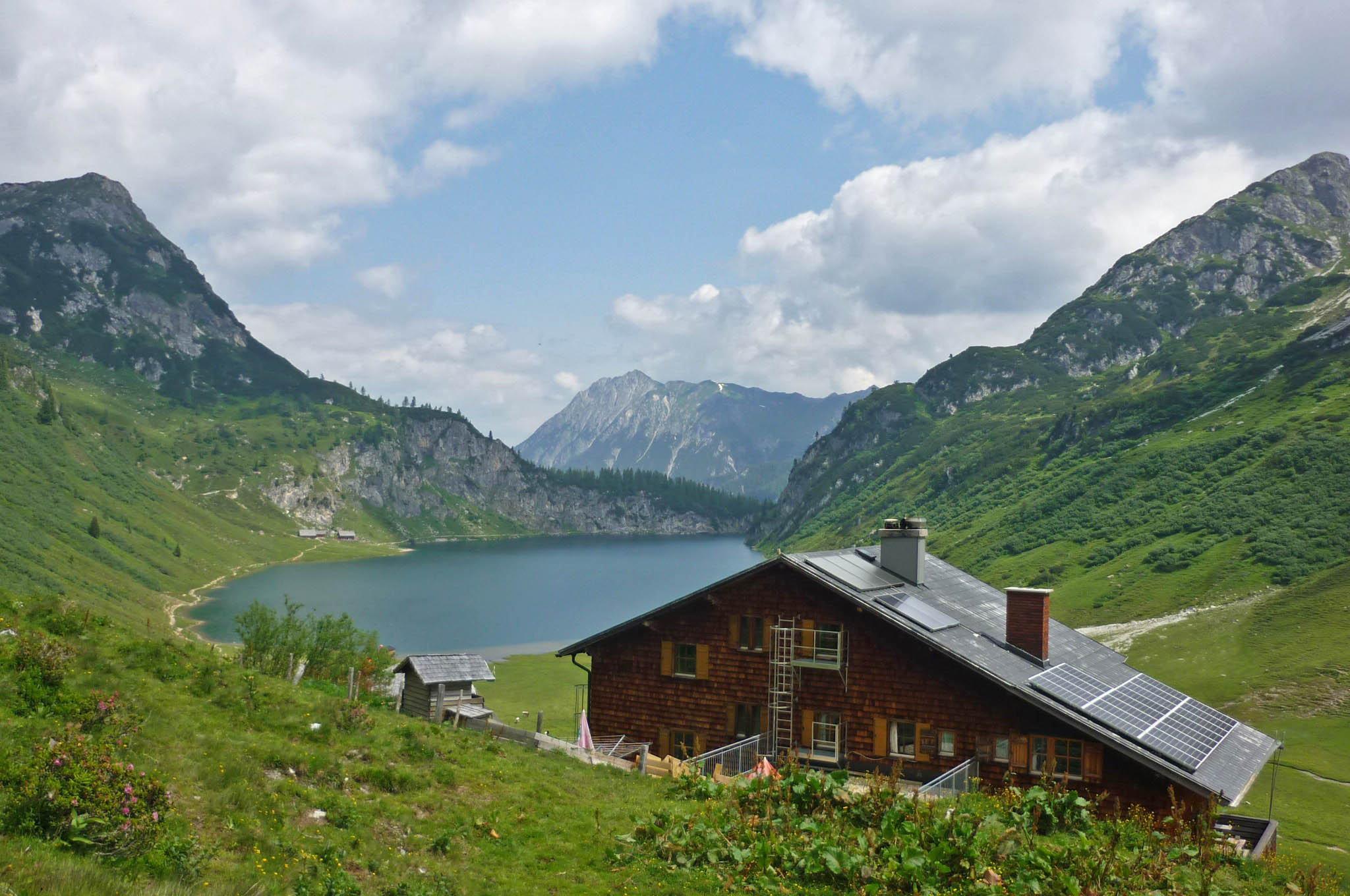
Tappenkarsee Hut

=== Alpine huts ===
- Südwiener Hut, 1,802 m
- Franz Fischer Hut, 2,001 m
- Stickler Hut, 1,752 m
- Speiereck Hut, 2,074 m
- Gnadenalm, 1,290 m
- Tappenkarsee Hut, 1,820 m
- Draugstein Hut, 1,714 m
- Kleinarler Hut, 1,754 m

=== Ski regions ===
Skiing in the Radstadt Tauern is concentrated around the village of Obertauern and in the ski areas in the north and northwest, near Altenmarkt-Zauchensee or Flachau. The Radstadt Tauern are also well known for their ski touring terrain.
