= Tauern Road Tunnel =

Highway tunnel in Austria

Coordinates: 47°12′11″N 13°25′41″E

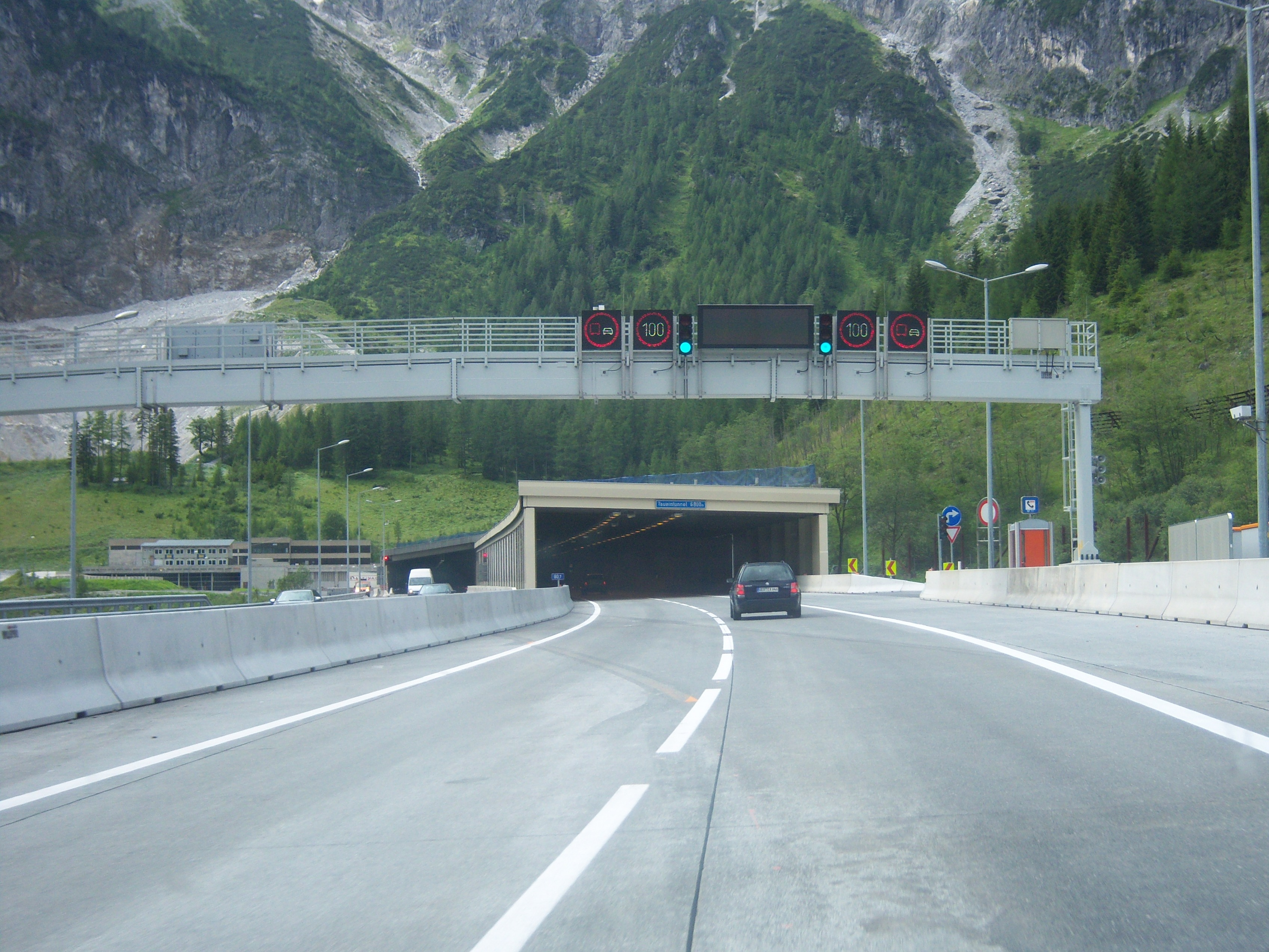
- North portal
- Interactive map of Tauern Road Tunnel

Overview
- Location: Salzburg, Austria
- Route: Flachau—Zederhaus

Operation
- Work began: 28 January 1971
- Opened: 21 June 1975
- Operator: ASFiNAG
- Traffic: ca. 18,000 road vehicles daily

Technical
- Length: 6,546 metres (21,476 ft)
- No. of lanes: 4
- Operating speed: 100 kilometres per hour (62 mph)

The Tauern Road Tunnel is located on the Tauern Autobahn (A10) in the Austrian federal state of Salzburg. The use is subject to a toll. With a length of 6,546 m (21,476 ft) (3.07 miles), the tunnel ranks as one of the longest frequently-travelled road tunnels in Austria.

== Location ==
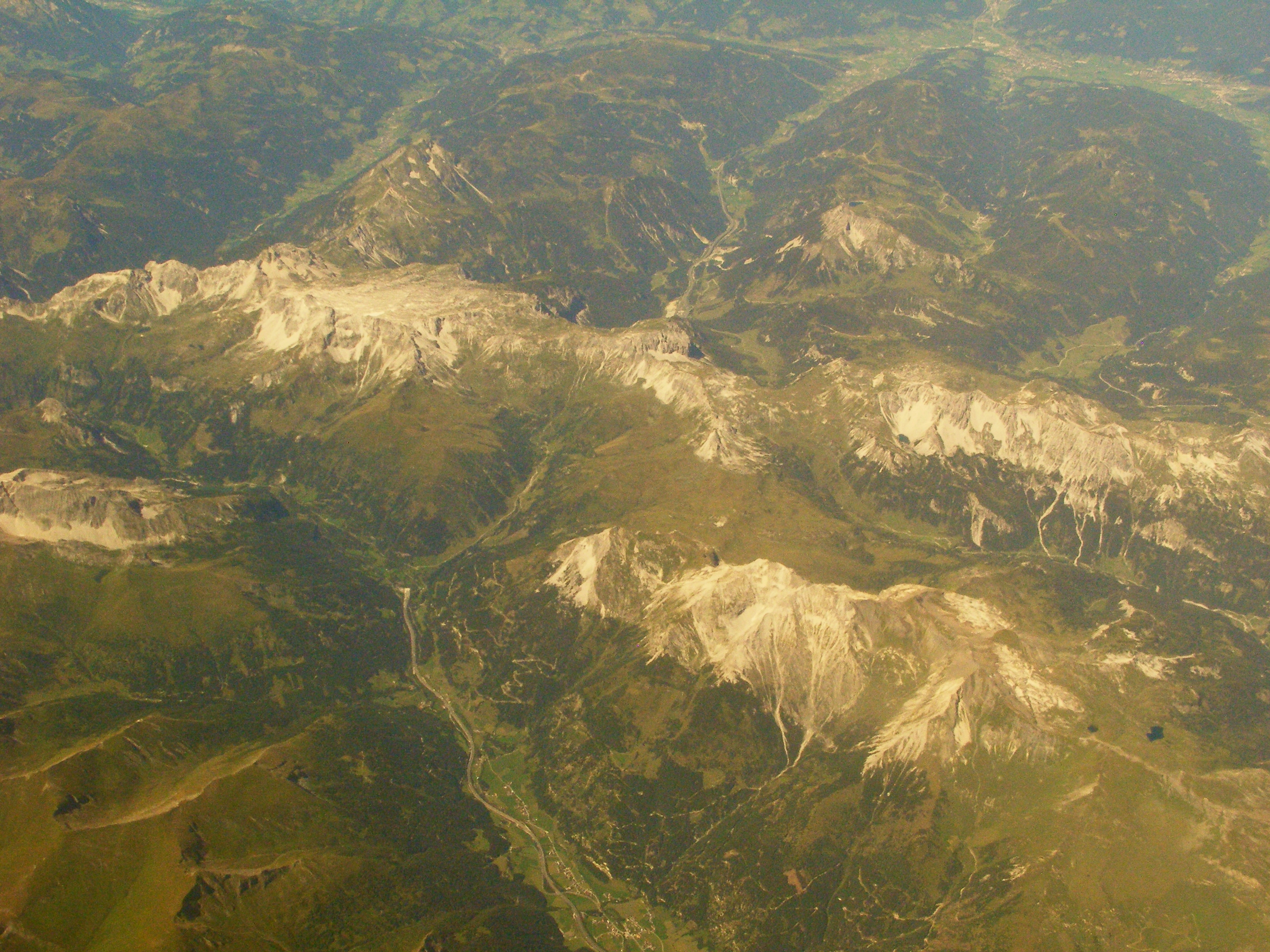
Radstadt Tauern crest, aerial view

The tunnel crosses under the Radstadt Tauern range, the westernmost part of the larger Low Tauern group. The north portal is in the municipality of Flachau in St. Johann im Pongau District (Pongau region), while the southern entrance is in Zederhaus in the Salzburg district of Tamsweg (Lungau). The nearby Radstädter Tauern Pass, about 8 km (5.0 mi) to the east, has historically been a possible crossing point of the Alpine crest.

A nearby historic adit in the Schladming Tauern at a height of 2,300 m (7,500 ft), connecting the present-day states of Salzburg and Styria, originates from medieval times when zinc, silver, cobalt and lead were mined here. A more exact dating of the Zinkwand drift is not possible. The tunnel is only 300 m (980 ft) long and was made accessible by the Austrian Alpine Club.

The road tunnel should not be confused with the parallel Tauern Rail Tunnel which crosses the High Tauern range between Bad Gastein in Salzburg and Mallnitz in Carinthia, taking both standard rail passengers as well as car shuttle trains between the two locations.

== Construction ==
Planned as a two bore tunnel from the beginning, the first bore of the Tauern Road Tunnel was completed in 1975 with a total length of 6,301 m (20,673 ft). Plans for the construction of the second, parallel tube were abandoned in 1988 and not resumed until the 1999 fire disaster (see below).

=== Extension ===
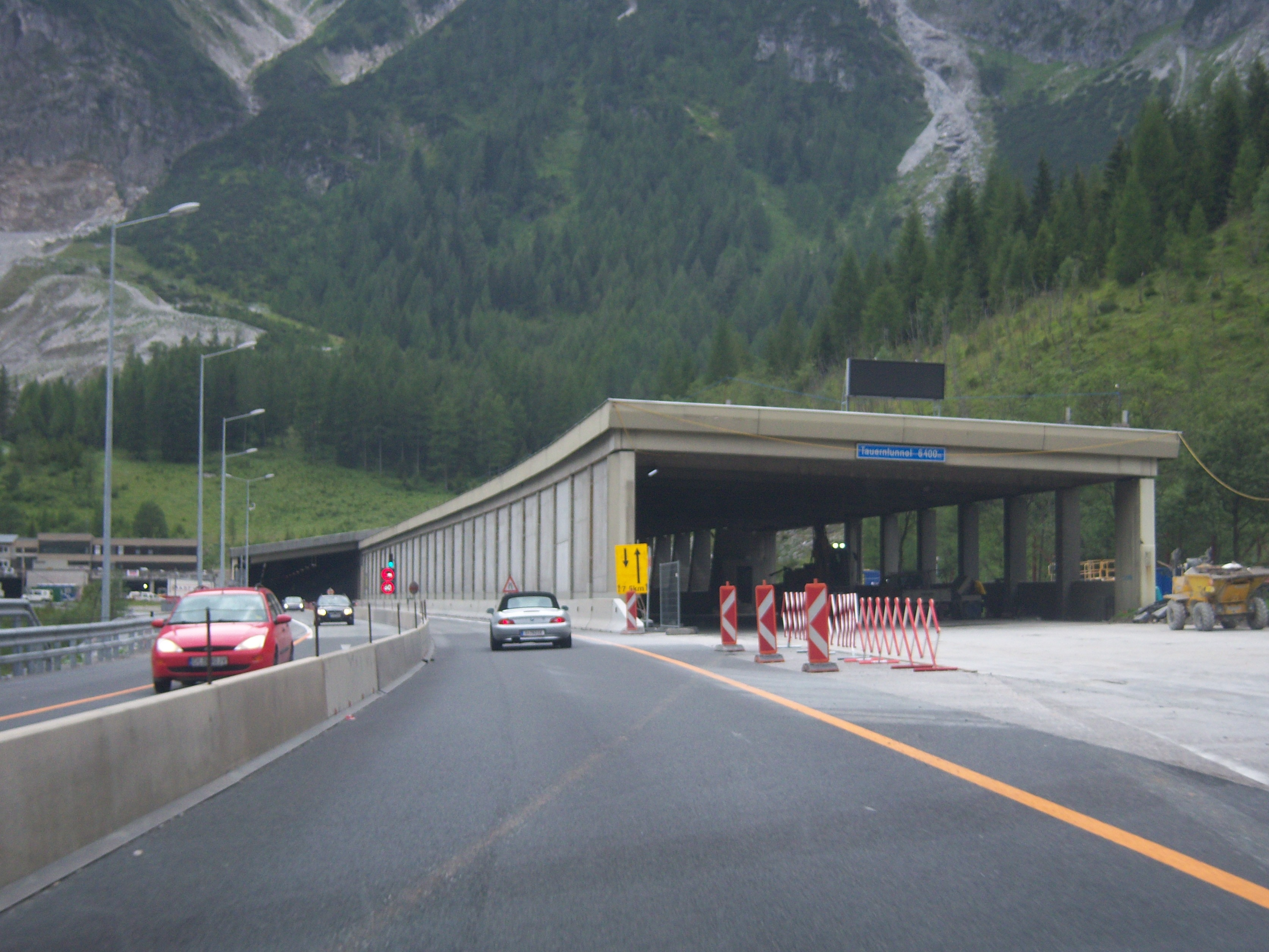
Construction work, August 2010

Works on the second tube began in July 2006; completed on 30 April 2010, they were followed by a general refurbishment of the older first bore. The two-tube tunnel was officially opened with a ceremony on 30 June 2011.

Today the Austrian Tauern Autobahn is an important north-south transport route through the Eastern Alps connecting Germany with Italy and Slovenia. In 2013, the average daily traffic passing the tunnel was about 18,000 vehicles, a quarter of which were large goods vehicles and trucks. The toll is 6 euros per car; a journey through the Tauern Tunnel and the adjacent Katschberg Tunnel costs 12 euros.

== 1999 fire catastrophe ==
On 29 May 1999, about 4:50 a.m., an accident in the tunnel led to a fire which killed twelve people and injured forty-two. Caused by a collision of up to 60 vehicles, the incident occurred when a truck collided with a column of stationary vehicles waiting at a traffic signal. As far as investigators determined, eight people were killed by the force of the collision of the truck while four more died from the resultant fire, exacerbated by escaping fuel and hazardous materials on one vehicle involved. All of the victims were burned to the point of leaving skeletal remains at most, and for those in more intense areas of the fire, nothing more than ashes.

The tunnel was so badly damaged by the heat from the fire that it had to be closed for three months for repairs during which major work was undertaken to improve the barriers, tunnel walls and ventilation system. A memorial service for the victims of the fire was held in the municipality of Flachau before the tunnel was officially reopened on 28 August 1999.
