= Radstadt =

- Municipality
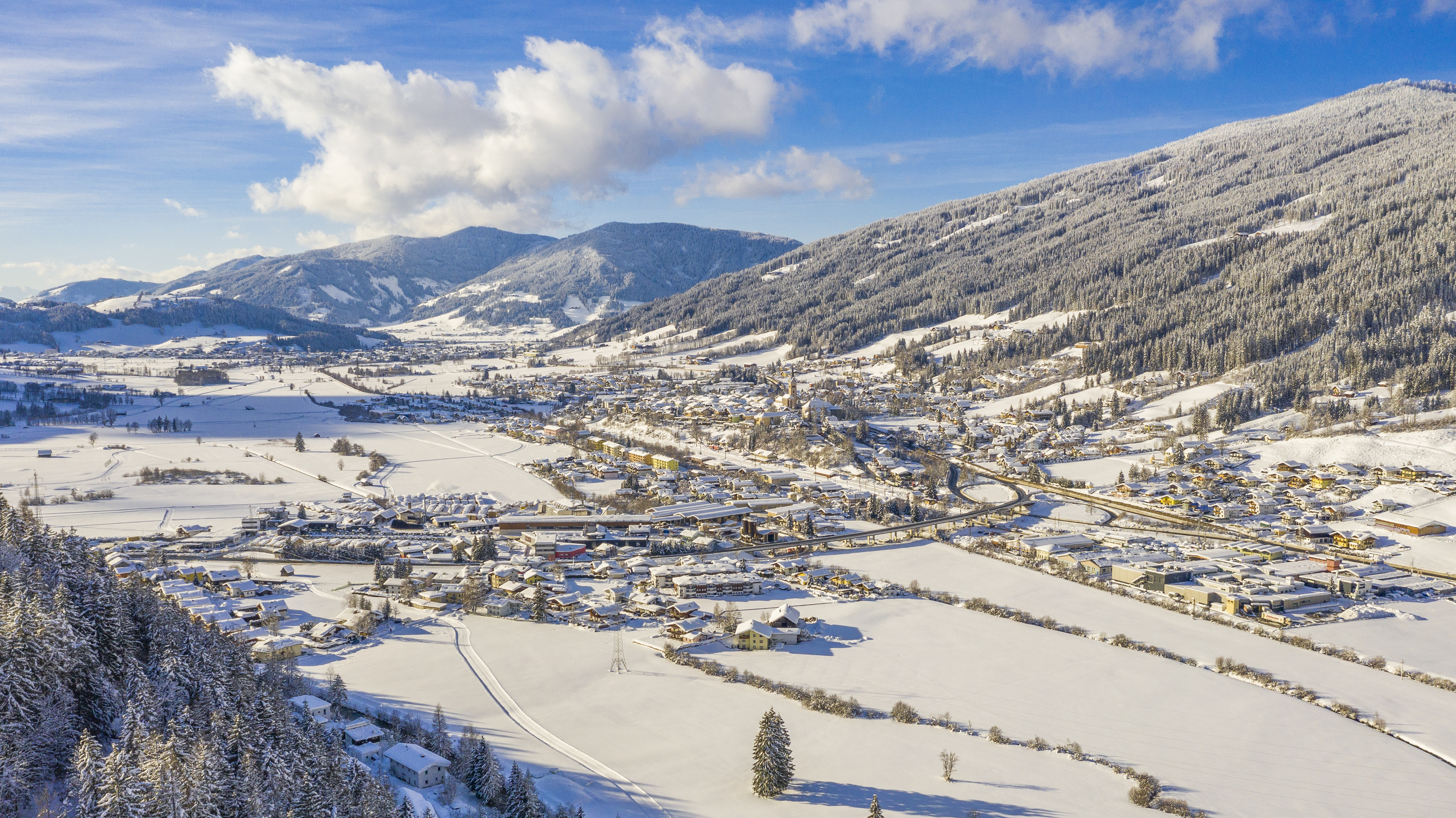
- Radstadt

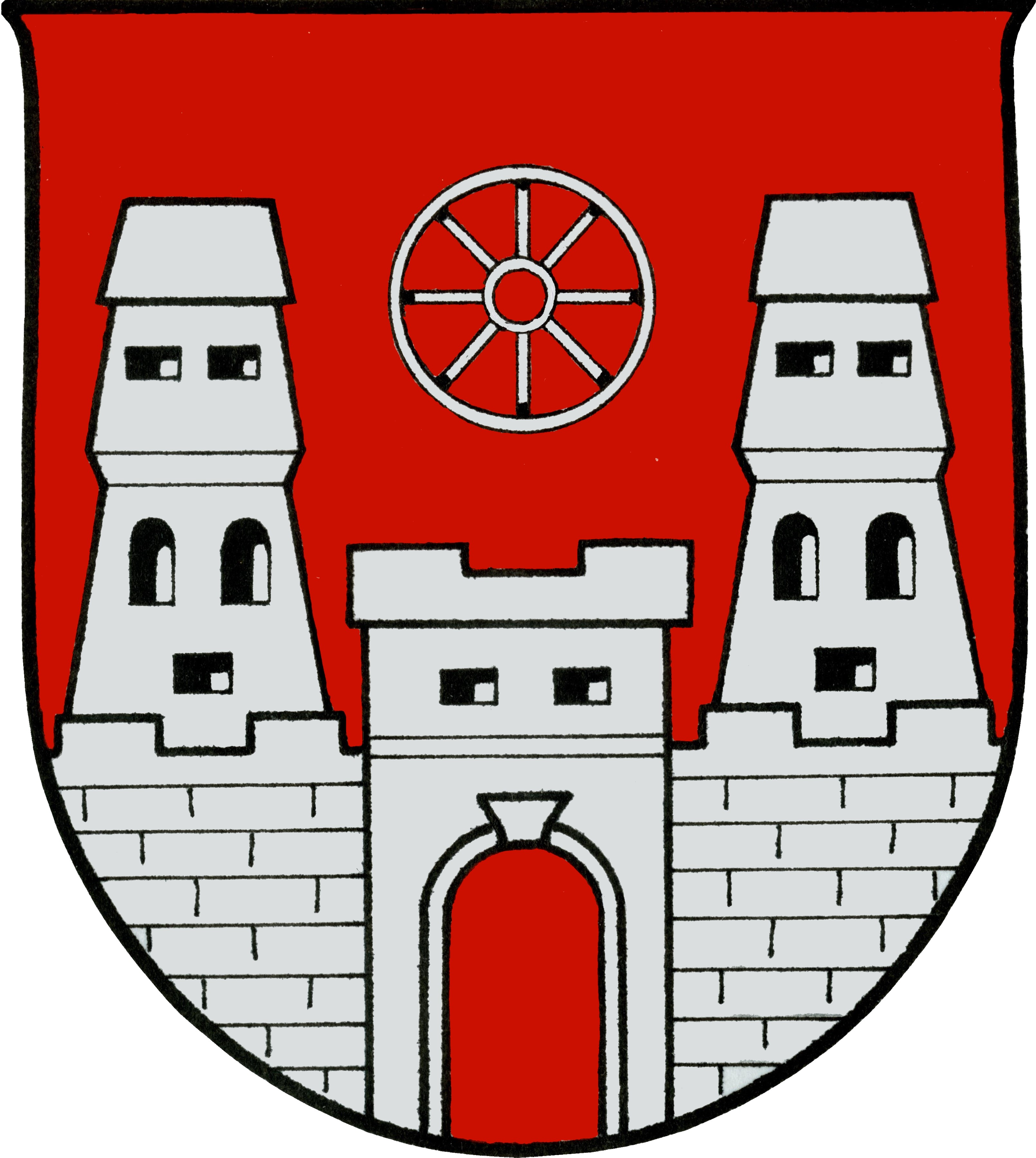
- Coat of arms

- Location within Austria
- Coordinates: 47°23′N 13°28′E
- Country: Austria
- State: Salzburg
- District: St. Johann im Pongau

Government
  - Mayor: Christian Pewny (FPÖ)

Area
  - Total: 60.82 km^{2} (23.48 sq mi)
- Elevation: 858 m (2,815 ft)

Population (2018-01-01)
  - Total: 4,823
  - Density: 79.30/km^{2} (205.4/sq mi)
- Time zone: UTC+1 (CET)
  - Summer (DST): UTC+2 (CEST)
- Postal code: 5550
- Website: https://www.radstadt.at

Radstadt (Central Bavarian: Rodstoud or Rodstod) is a historic town in the district of St. Johann im Pongau in the Austrian state of Salzburg.

== Geography ==
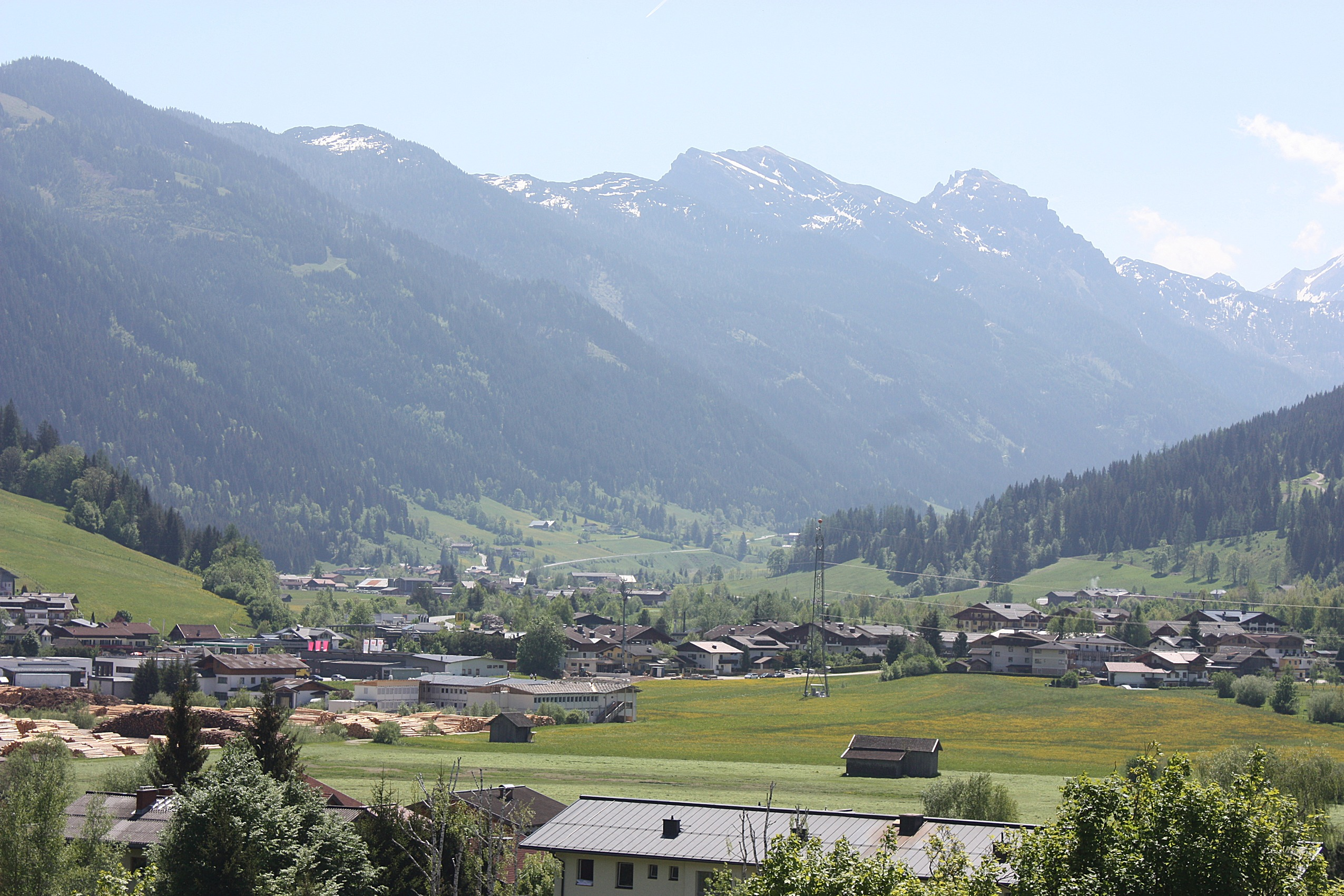
View into the Taurach valley

The town is part of the Salzburg Pongau region. It is located in the valley of the Enns River, near the confluence with its Taurach tributary, at the foot of Roßbrand mountain, part of the Salzburg Slate Alps. In the south the road runs parallel to the Taurach stream up to Untertauern, the Obertauern ski resort and the Radstädter Tauern Pass at 1,738 metres (5,702 ft), which marks the border with the Salzburg Lungau region. In the east, the Ennstal road leads to Schladming in Upper Styria.

The municipal area comprises the cadastral communities of Höggen, Löbenau, Mandling, Radstadt proper, and Schwemmberg.

== History ==
In the 4th century before the Common Era the area was settled by Celtic tribes, their Noricum kingdom was incorporated as a Roman province about 15 BC. The road across the Tauern Pass was part of a major Roman road, leading from Aquileia in Italy to the city of Iuvavum (present-day Salzburg) in the north.

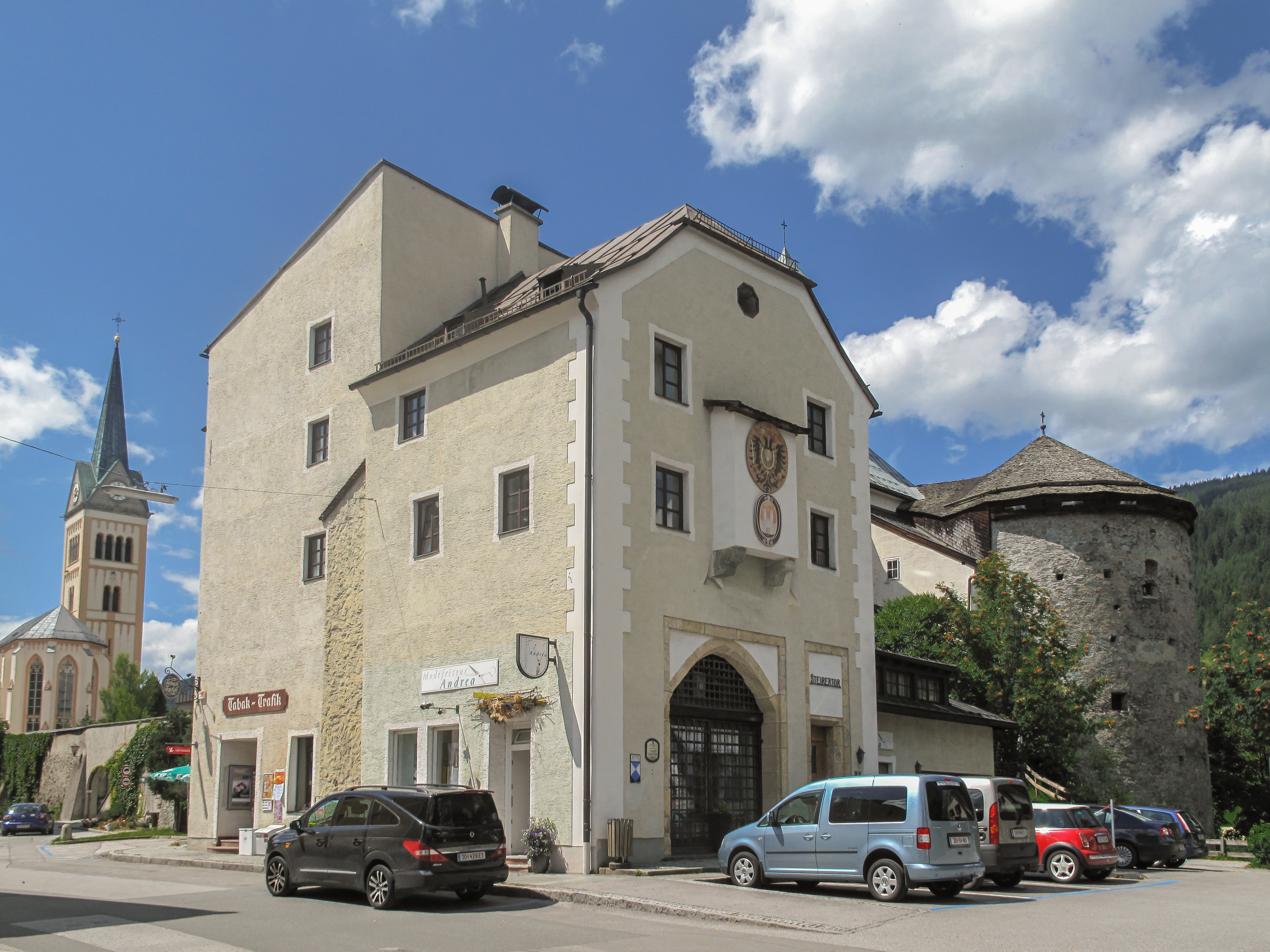
Styrian Gate and Capuchin Tower

A place called Rastat (i.e. "resting place") was already mentioned in a 1074 deed. The fortress of Radstadt was founded in the 13th century, when the Pongau region became part of the Archbishopric of Salzburg and border conflicts arose with the Habsburg dukes of Styria; it received city rights in 1289. The town served as seat of the local administration and was of significant value for the protection of the Enns Valley and the road crossing the Alpine crest via Radstädter Tauern Pass towards Carinthia and Aquileia. Radstadt has a Gothic church consecrated in 1417, and a town hall dating from 16th century.

In the German Peasants' War of 1524/25, the citizens sided with Prince-Archbishop Matthäus Lang von Wellenburg and resisted a siege by a peasants' army of about 5,000 men led by Michael Gaismair. The city walls are preserved, including three towers which the besiegers were forced to erect after their defeat. in 1629 the prince-archbishops established a Capuchin monastery here to spread the Counter-Reformation in the Enns Valley. As in many other Salzburg areas under the rule of Archbishop Leopold Anton von Firmian, the Protestant population was expelled in 1731/32; as Exulanten they were granted asylum by the Prussian king Frederick William I and settled in the Gumbinnen region of East Prussia.

Today Radstadt is also a popular tourism resort, with more tourists annually than the year-round population. It features its own ski area, and is part of an extended downhill ski and snowboard region (Ski Amadé) with links with the neighbouring town of Altenmarkt.

== Politics ==
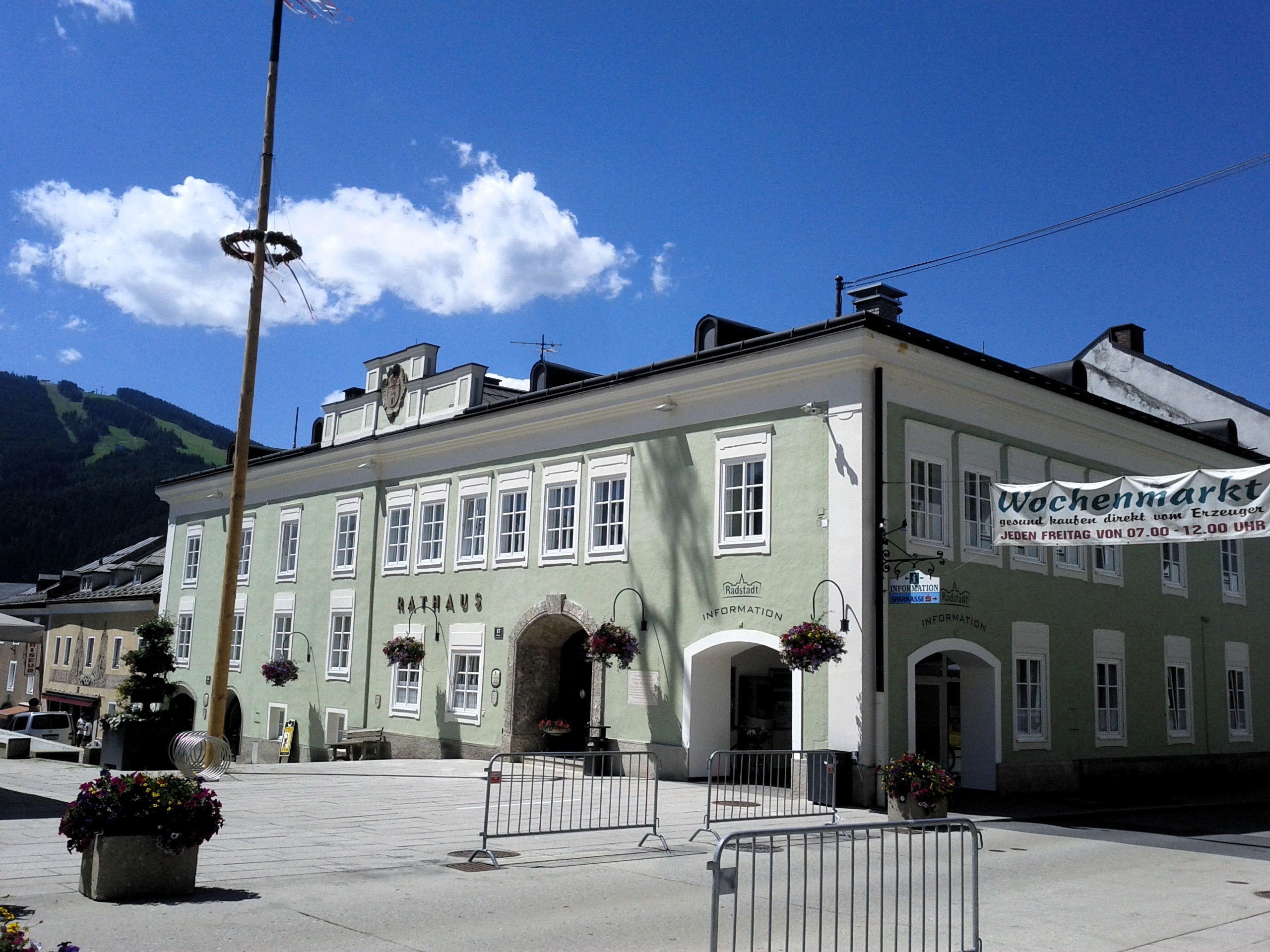
Town hall

Seats in the municipal assembly (Stadtsenat) as of 2014 elections

- 10 Austrian People's Party (ÖVP)
- 7 Social Democratic Party of Austria (SPÖ)
- 4 Freedom Party of Austria (FPÖ)

== Notable people ==
- Paul Hofhaimer (1459–1537), organist and composer; gifted at improvisation
- Josef Schintlmeister (1908–1971), an Austrian-German nuclear physicist and alpinist

=== Sport ===
- Putzi Frandl (born 1930), alpine ski racer, silver medallist at the 1956 Winter Olympics
- Andreas Schifferer (born 1974), former Austrian alpine skier who won a bronze medal at the 2002 Winter Olympics
- Michael Walchhofer (born 1975), alpine ski racer, silver medallist at the 2006 Winter Olympics
- Teresa Stadlober (born 1993), an Austrian cross-country skier and bronze medallist at the 2022 Winter Olympics
