= Tweng =

- Municipality
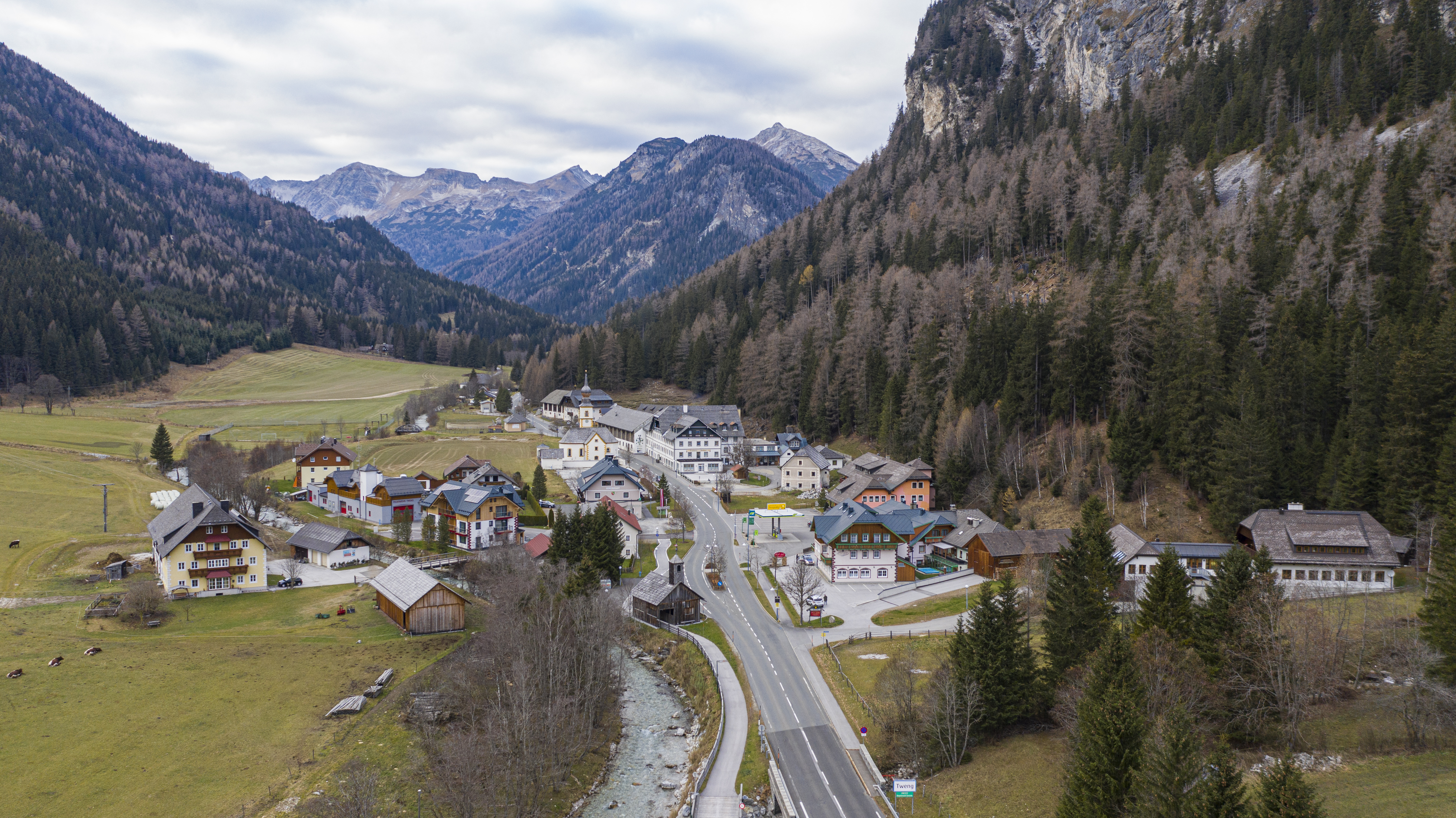

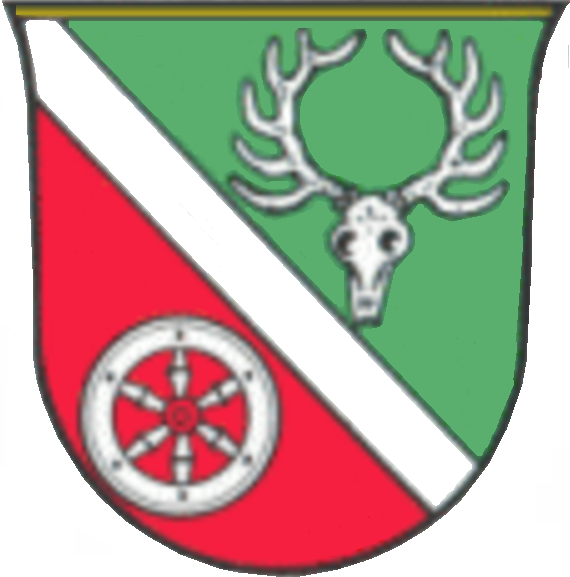
- Coat of arms

- Location within Austria
- Coordinates: 47°11′28″N 13°36′01″E
- Country: Austria
- State: Salzburg
- District: Tamsweg

Government
  - Mayor: Friedrich Rigele (ÖVP)

Area
  - Total: 86.54 km^{2} (33.41 sq mi)
- Elevation: 1,233 m (4,045 ft)

Population (2018-01-01)
  - Total: 276
  - Density: 3.19/km^{2} (8.26/sq mi)
- Time zone: UTC+1 (CET)
  - Summer (DST): UTC+2 (CEST)
- Postal code: 5563
- Area code: 06471
- Vehicle registration: TA
- Website: www.tweng.at

Tweng is a municipality in the district of Tamsweg in the state of Salzburg in Austria.

== Geography ==
Tweng lies in the Lungau on the south side of the Radstädter Tauern.

== Gallery ==
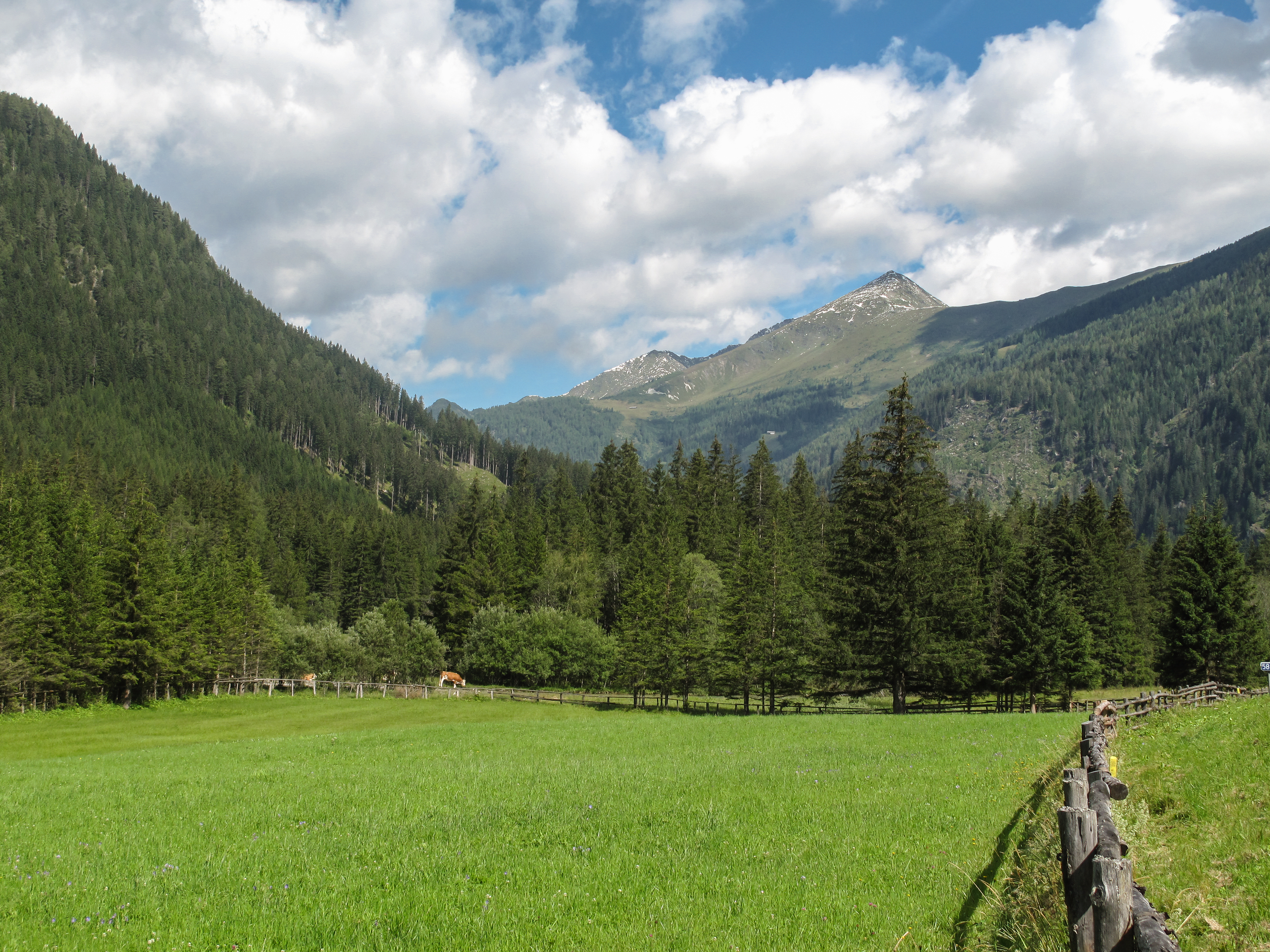
between Vorder and Mauterndorf, panorama

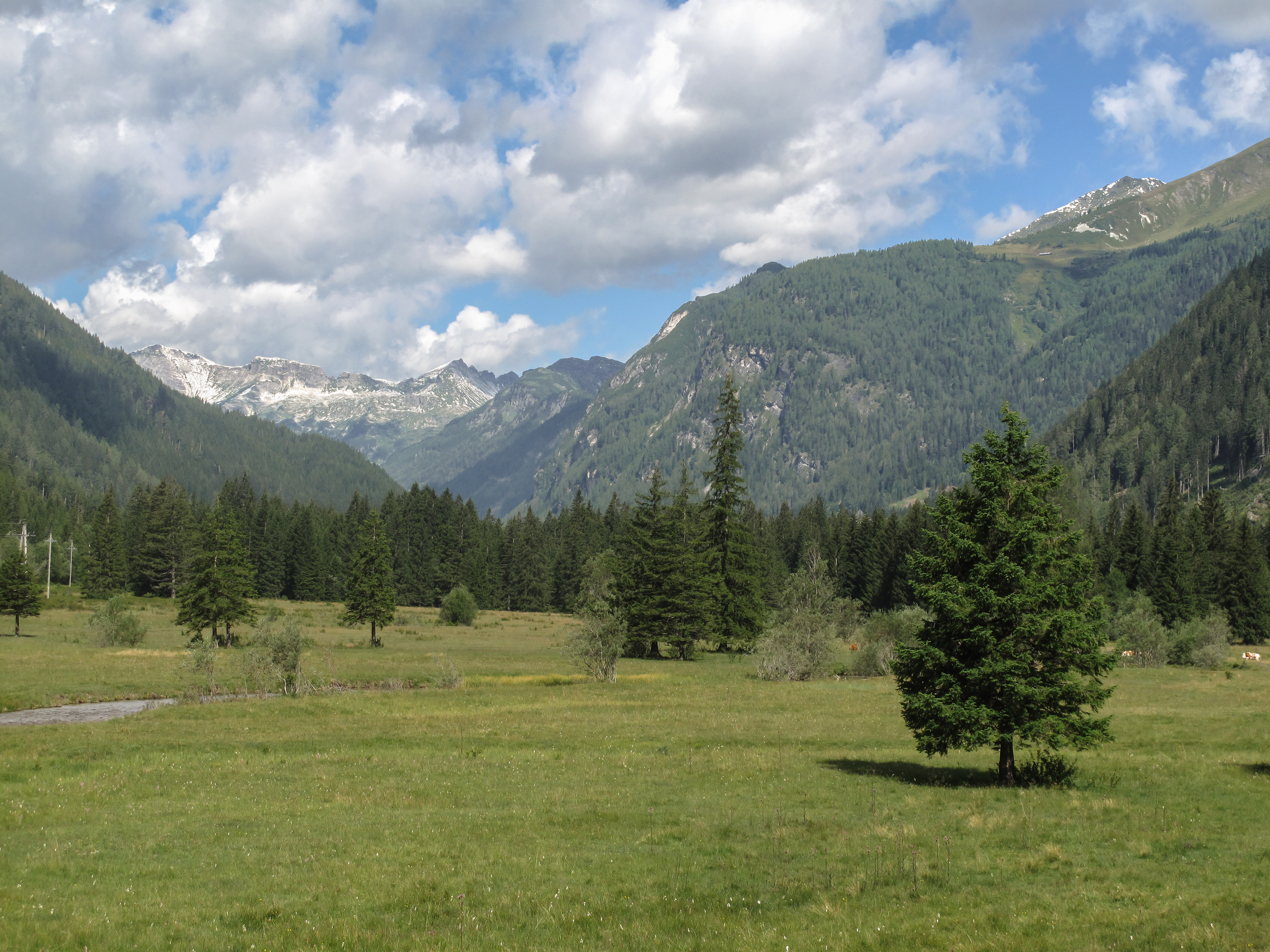
between Vorder and Mauterndorf, panorama

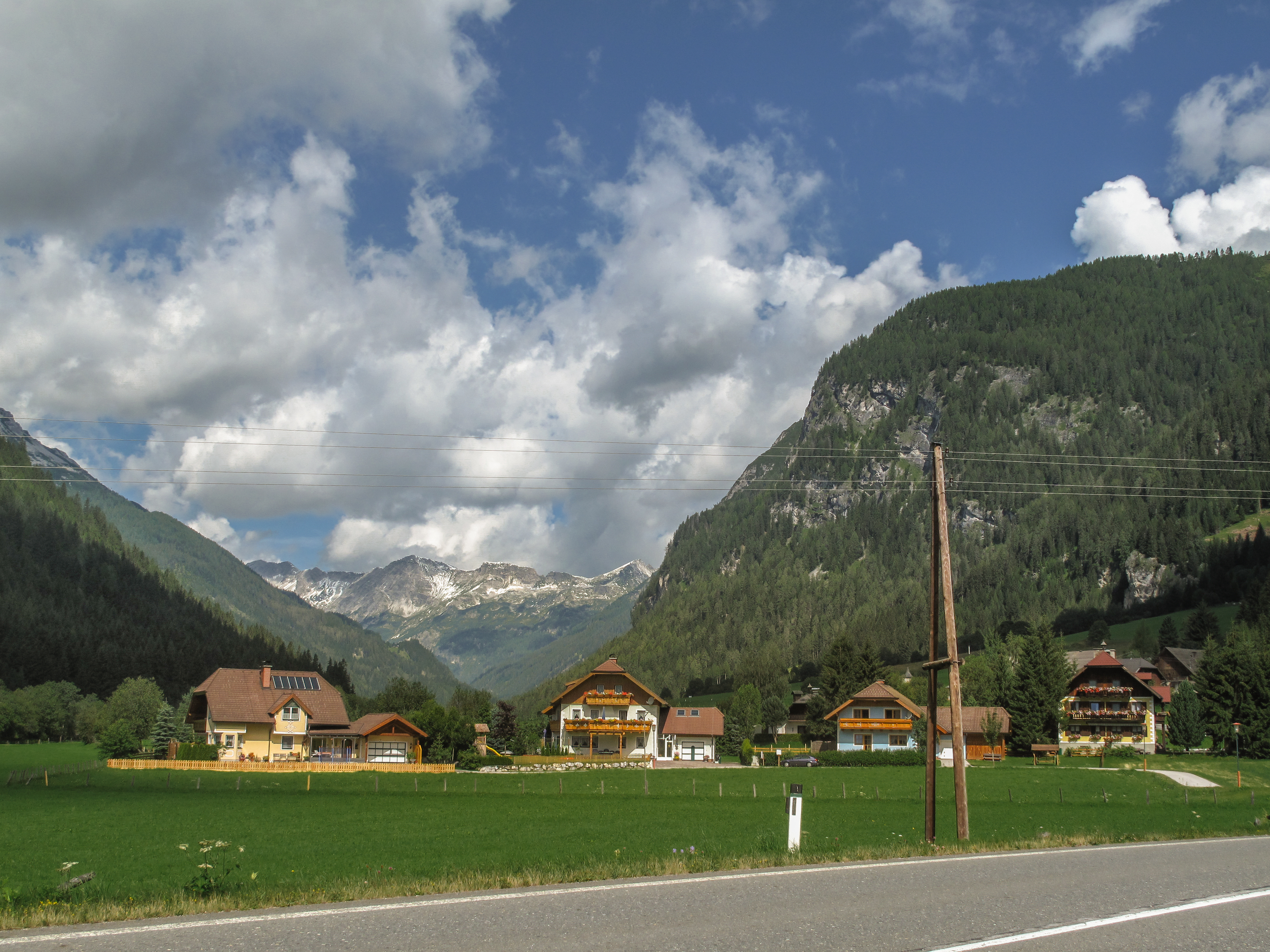
Vorder, view to the village
