= Obertauern =

Winter sports resort in Austria

Coordinates: 47.2505°N 13.5552°E

Location of Obertauern in Austria

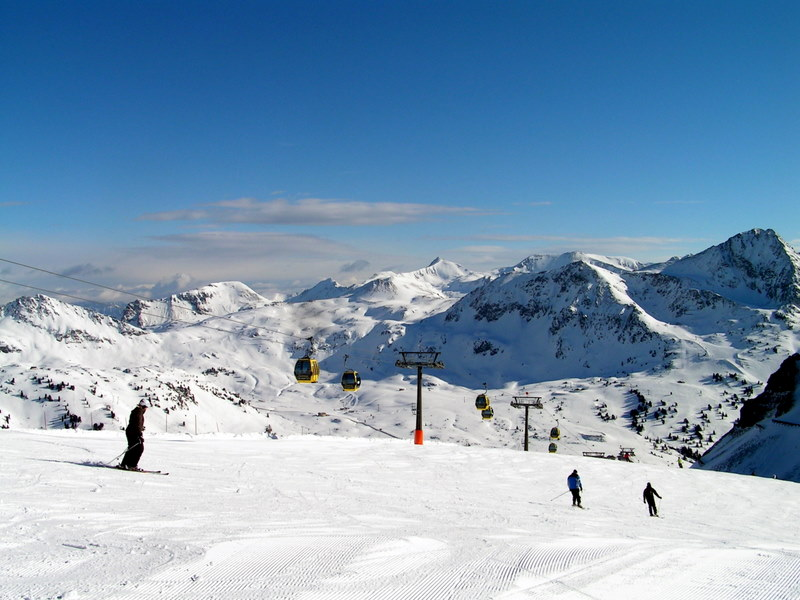
Obertauern ski area

Obertauern is a tourist destination which is located in the Radstädter Tauern in the Salzburger Land of Austria. The winter sports resort is separated in two communities: Tweng and Untertauern.

== Geography ==
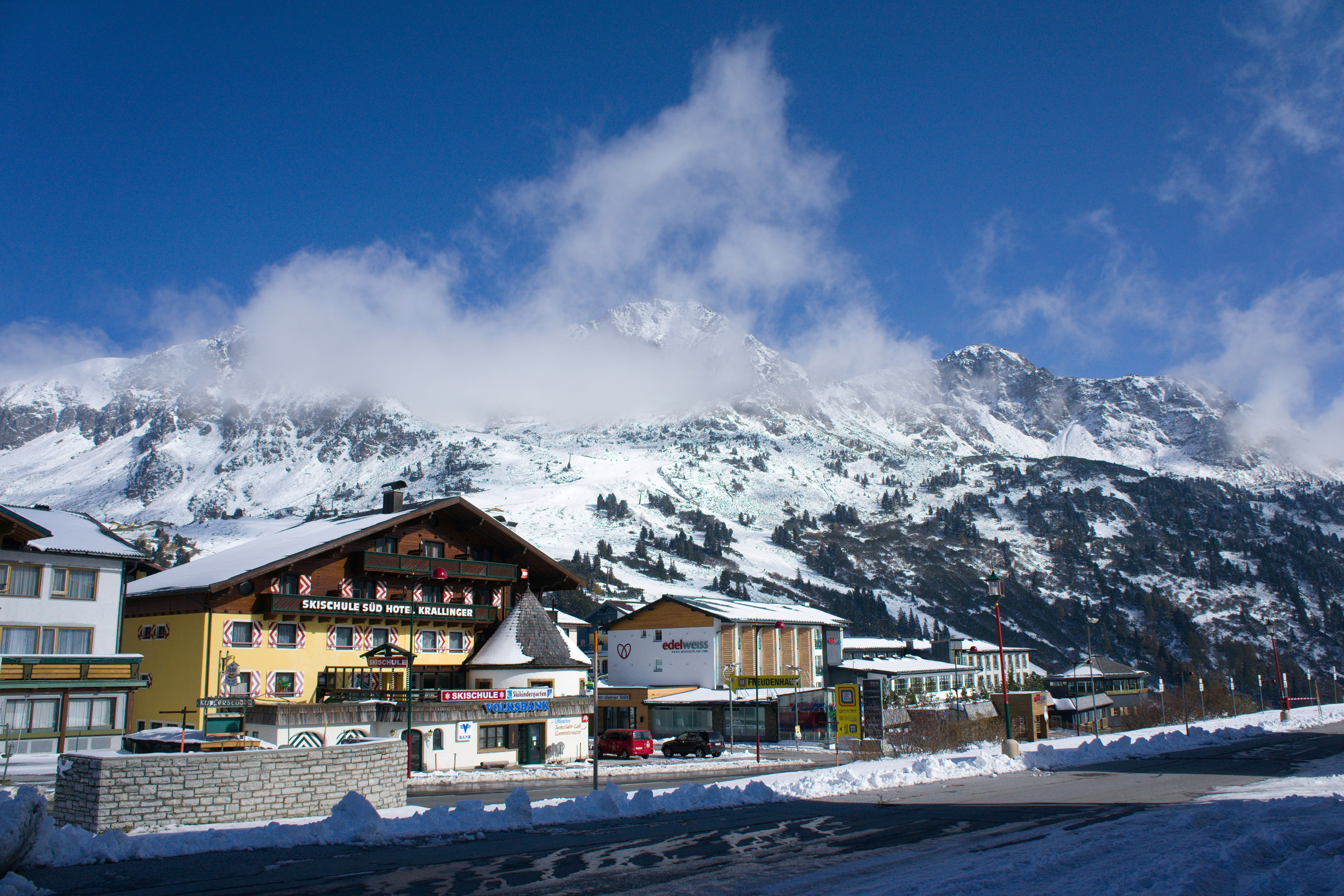
Obertauern is amongst the bigger skiing centres in Austria.

Obertauern lies in the southeast of the state of Salzburg in the Radstädter Tauern mountains at heights of between 1,630 and 2,526 metres above sea level. The village is near to the highest point of the Radstädter Tauern Pass over which the Katschberg road (Katschberger Straße, the B 99) runs. Obertauern belongs to two districts: St. Johann/Pongau and Tamsweg, hence why the community is separated into the two municipalities of Untertauern (Pongau) and Tweng (Lungau). The municipal boundary runs at the height of the pass and hence through the centre of the village.

=== Climate ===
Obertauern has a subarctic climate (Köppen Dfc).

Climate data for Obertauern: 1772m (1991−2020 normals)
Month	Jan	Feb	Mar	Apr	May	Jun	Jul	Aug	Sep	Oct	Nov	Dec	Year
Record high °C (°F)	10.5 (50.9)	12.6 (54.7)	15.0 (59.0)	18.2 (64.8)	23.9 (75.0)	28.2 (82.8)	28.1 (82.6)	28.1 (82.6)	22.7 (72.9)	21.1 (70.0)	16.2 (61.2)	11.0 (51.8)	28.2 (82.8)
Mean daily maximum °C (°F)	−1.6 (29.1)	−1.3 (29.7)	1.7 (35.1)	5.6 (42.1)	10.1 (50.2)	13.7 (56.7)	15.4 (59.7)	15.5 (59.9)	11.4 (52.5)	7.5 (45.5)	2.2 (36.0)	−1.1 (30.0)	6.6 (43.9)
Daily mean °C (°F)	−4.5 (23.9)	−4.3 (24.3)	−1.6 (29.1)	2.1 (35.8)	6.6 (43.9)	10.4 (50.7)	12.2 (54.0)	12.3 (54.1)	8.1 (46.6)	4.5 (40.1)	−0.5 (31.1)	−3.8 (25.2)	3.5 (38.2)
Mean daily minimum °C (°F)	−6.9 (19.6)	−8.0 (17.6)	−4.8 (23.4)	−1.5 (29.3)	2.3 (36.1)	5.8 (42.4)	7.5 (45.5)	7.6 (45.7)	4.2 (39.6)	1.0 (33.8)	−3.1 (26.4)	−6.1 (21.0)	−0.2 (31.7)
Record low °C (°F)	−20.6 (−5.1)	−22.2 (−8.0)	−22.3 (−8.1)	−14.8 (5.4)	−6.5 (20.3)	−3.2 (26.2)	−0.7 (30.7)	−1.5 (29.3)	−4.9 (23.2)	−13.7 (7.3)	−16.8 (1.8)	−22.3 (−8.1)	−22.3 (−8.1)
Average precipitation mm (inches)	39.0 (1.54)	27.8 (1.09)	49.4 (1.94)	53.3 (2.10)	103.3 (4.07)	158.6 (6.24)	182.9 (7.20)	168.8 (6.65)	112.4 (4.43)	79.6 (3.13)	55.5 (2.19)	35.1 (1.38)	1,065.7 (41.96)
Source: Central Institute for Meteorology and Geodynamics

== History ==
=== Celts and Romans ===
Obertauern has a long history, which goes back to the era of the Celts (4th – 1st century B.C.). Also, the Roman road led over the Tauern Pass (in Alpe) to Iuvavum (Salzburg). The tracks of old Roman wagons have been uncovered on this road. The relics of old milestones attest to Roman use of the pass. The upgrade of the road probably dates back to the time of the Emperor Claudius (41-54).

=== Development of the village ===
The first definite mention of the Radstädter Tauern was in the year 1207. In 1224, the records note that there was already a small church at the top of the pass. In 1517, it is documented that there were two innkeepers on the Tauern, referring to the houses of Schaidberg and Wisenegg. These two buildings are still in good order today. In 1519, the road was widened for to take coaches and wagons. In 1764, Archbishop Sigismund of Schrattenbach opened the posting house of Untertauern and there were two post runs per week. In 1870 this increased to four per week, and, in 1895, to twice daily. In 1902, the first skiers are recorded.

=== The tourist resort of Obertauern ===
In 1920, after the First World War, the first skiers came to Obertauern – on foot. Their baggage was transported by horse-drawn sleighs. From 1925 to 1927, the so-called Tauern races for cars and motorcycles took place, attracting many visitors. The people of Obertauern date the foundation of their village to 8 December 1929, because it was on that day that regular winter traffic over the Tauern Pass began for the first time. In 1948, the first lift was installed at the Seekarhaus. From 1948 to 1960, the slope was posted by skiers. For one hour of piste preparation, they got 3 free runs. Roads and avalanche protection were extended in 1950 and the first button lifts were built. The creation of the hotel village of Obertauern began in 1952. Between 1952 and 1961, a large number of modern cable cars, gondola lifts and drag lifts were installed.

=== From the 1960s to the present day ===
In 1961, the modern cable car on the Zehnerkar was taken into service. In 1962, Obertauern became the official name of the village. One year later, the first motorised piste basher in Austria started work in Obertauern and the pistes no longer had to be tamped down by foot by the skiers. At that time the "Skiing Comprehensive School" (Schifahrende Volksschule) became well-known; the school incorporating skiing in the afternoons, after following the normal timetable in the mornings.

In 1965, Obertauern was used by The Beatles in their film, "Help!". The town was chosen as it was one of the few areas to have snow at the time.

1967 saw piste construction using bulldozers took place for the first time. This resulted in radical changes to the terrain in order to make the runs easier to negotiate for piste maintenance equipment and also for a wider range of tourists. By linking several of the lifts, a precursor to the present day Tauern Circuit (Tauernrunde) was created.

In 1985 the first snow cannon was installed and in the years that followed numerous drag lifts and chair lifts were replaced. Between 1991 and 1998 many modernization projects were completed – such as the floodlit ski slope and the introduction of the contactless ski pass system. In December 1999, the German, Christian Flühr, set the world marathon skiing record in Obertauern – skiing for three days non-stop (68 hours and 23 minutes). This is the distance between America and Europe. One season later, in February 2001, Christian Flühr set the world record again by skiing for more than 4 days (103 hours and 21 minutes) non-stop. Later, he beat this world record several times but in other locations.

Obertauern has also established itself as one of the top après ski resorts in Austria. The Edelweißalm and the area around the Lürzer Alm are internationally renowned.

== Cemetery of the Unknown ==
At the top of the pass is the Cemetery of the Unknown (Friedhof der Namenlosen). The name comes from the time when people crossed the Tauern Pass on foot with poor clothing and equipment, often in bad weather, losing their lives as a result. Often these travellers could not be identified and were thus buried "nameless". Today it is the cemetery for the population of the ski village of Obertauern.

== Winter sport in Obertauern ==
=== Skiing and snowboarding ===
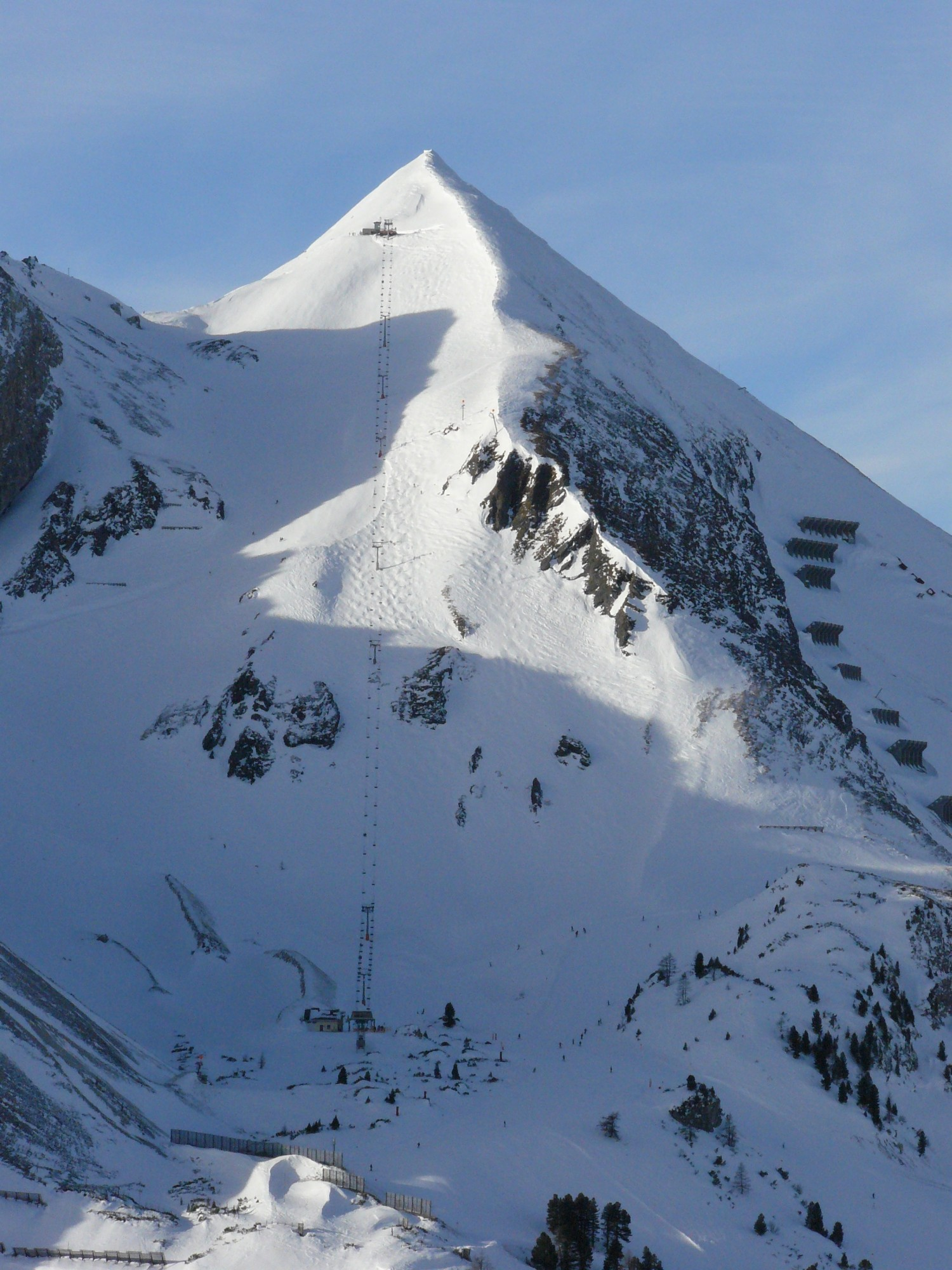
The legendary Gamsleiten peak

Skiing is the most popular sporting activity in Obertauern, followed by snowboarding. The ski region has around 100 kilometres of prepared pistes and 26 lifts that are capable of transporting 48,000 - 49,000 people per hour. The area is served by 1 gondola, 19 chair lifts and 6 drag lifts, and has 100 km of runs. The pistes are graded using a colour scheme: blue (61%) for easy runs, red (35%) for runs of medium difficulty and black (4%) for difficult pistes, the piste alongside the Gamsleiten 2 lift being the second steepest run in Austria. All the lifts will take non-skiers to the top as well, but only the Zehnerkarbahn and Grünwaldkopfbahn will take passengers down again. Daytime visitors may park on the 24,000 m^{2} of car parks in the vicinity of the slopes. The Liftgemeinschaft Obertauern (LGO) is responsible for all the lifts.

=== The Tauern Circuit ===
Because the lifts are laid out in a circle around the village, it is possible to do a "Tauern Circuit" (Tauernrunde), either clockwise (following the red signs) or anti-clockwise (following the green signs). To cross the B 99 (Katschberg-Straße) there are ski bridges by the Gamsleiten/Edelweiß, Kirchbühel (two bridges) and Grünwaldkopf/Zehnerkar pistes. The circuit may begin at any lift and returns the skier to the start. Good signposting also enables pistes outside the circuit to be skied.

=== Cross-country skiing ===
In addition to downhill skiing and snowboarding, Obertauern offers other winter sport activities. Visitors may used the 26 kilometres of cut cross-country skiing tracks, including one used for the world cup, as well as hiking trails.

=== Ski passes ===
Obertauern has its own ski pass that, since the 2012/13 season, is also valid for the Großeck-Speiereck ski region some 15 kilometres away. The Lungo Ski Pass (for the Obertauern - Lungau - Katschberg region) and the "Super Salzburg Ski Card" (Salzburger Land) are also valid, but not the Ski Amadé pass.

== Summer tourism ==
In summer, Obertauern is a popular base for numerous hiking trails because the village lies on the Central Alpine Way (Zentralalpenweg). The two Alpine huts, Oberhütte towards Styria and the Südwiener Hütte in the direction of Flachau may be reached in 2 hours on foot.

In August and September, motorcycle gatherings take place.

However, Obertauern is mostly a winter resort and many hotels and businesses are closed in the summertime.

== Obertauern sports centre ==
Obertauern has a sports centre (the Sportzentrum Obertauern) where visitors may play various sports. Facilities include: 2 tennis indoor courts, 3 squash courts, 1 badminton court, 3 fully automatic bowling alleys, a bodybuilding and fitness room with a cardio area, a multi-purpose hall as well as a billiards facility. There is also a big vitality centre (600 square metres) and sports medical advice is available. In earlier times, famous sportsmen like Hermann Maier and Michael Walchhofer trained in this centre between races. Heinz Schilchegger, a world-class skier, is also from Obertauern.

== Flora and fauna ==
Obertauern is also popular with scientists and friends of nature. In this region you can find the rare red-breasted bluethroat.
