= Kasereck =

Peak in the Schladming Tauern, Austrian Central Alps

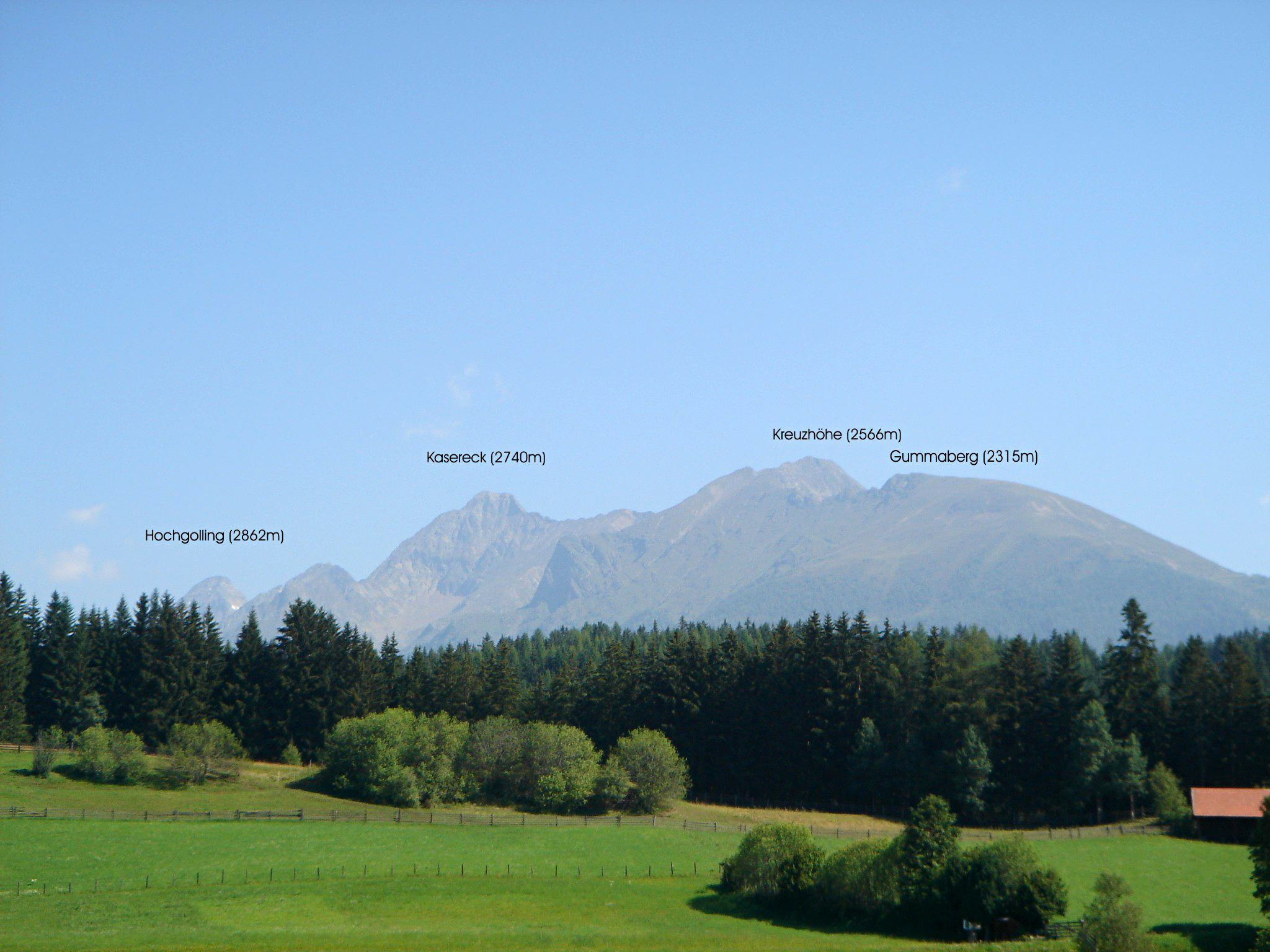
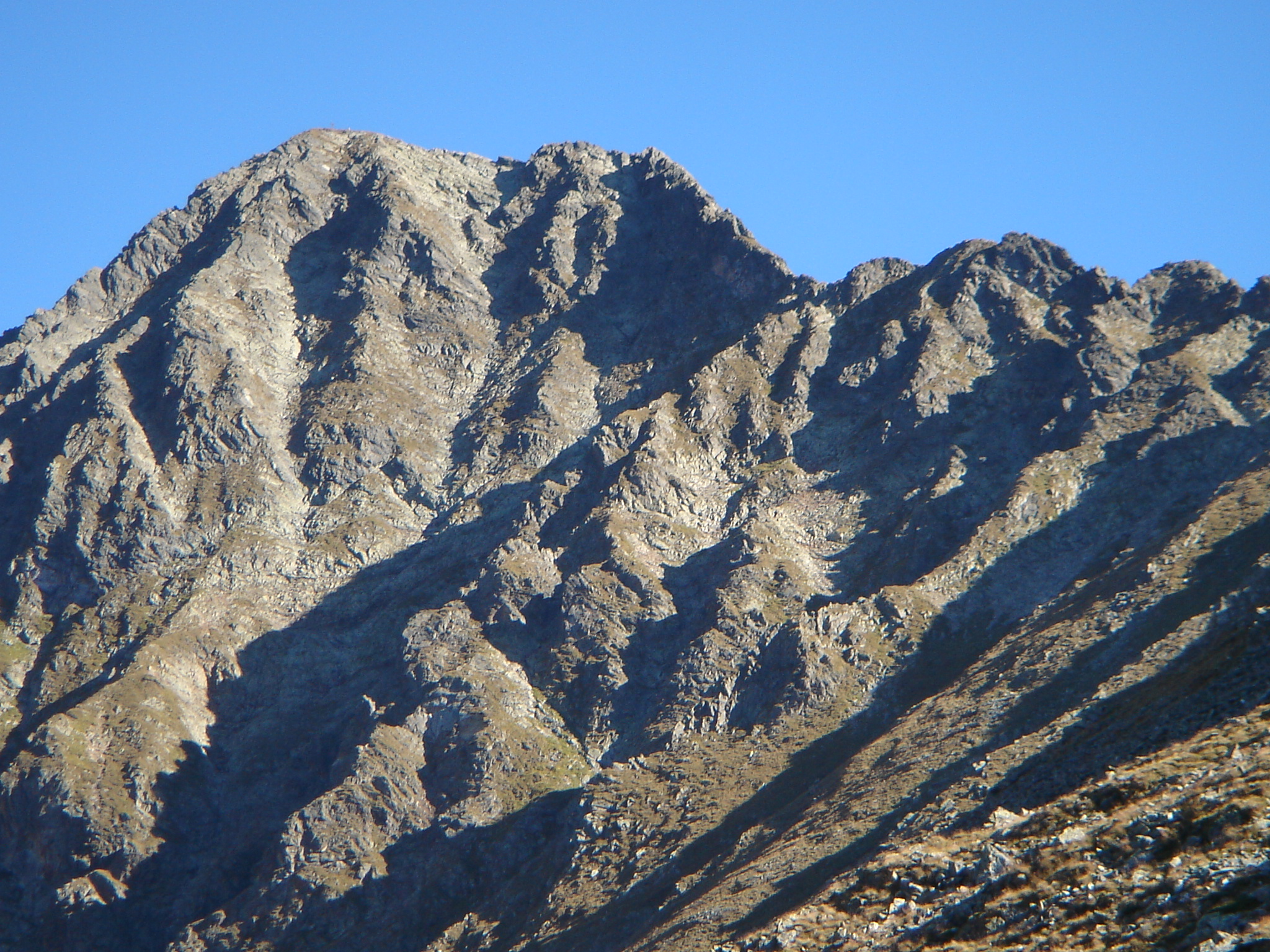
- The Kasereck in July 2007 with surrounding peaks (Gumma, Kreuzhöhe) The Kasereck

Highest point
- Elevation: 2,740 m (AA) (8,990 ft)
- Prominence: 425 m ↓ Kaserscharte
- Isolation: 3.0 km → Hochgolling
- Coordinates: 47°13′59″N 13°46′00″E

Geography
- Location within Austria
- Location: Salzburg, Österreich
- Parent range: Schladminger Tauern, Niedere Tauern

Climbing
- First ascent: Hans Wödl
- Normal route: Via the Furtriegel along the summit arête (west flank, UIAA I)

The Kasereck, at 2,740 m above sea level (AA), is one of the highest peaks of the Schladming Tauern and thus also the Lower Tauern. It is the most prominent summit on the crest that runs from the Hochgolling southwards and separates the valleys of Göriachtal in the west and Lessachtal in the east. Geographically this mountain lies in Salzburg state and is most easily climbed from Göriach in the Lungau.

Below the mountain nestles the lake of Piendlsee (2,033 m above sea level (AA)). The easiest ascent runs from the Göriacher Winkel from the Piendlalm via the Piendlsee and the southwest arête and west flank to the top.

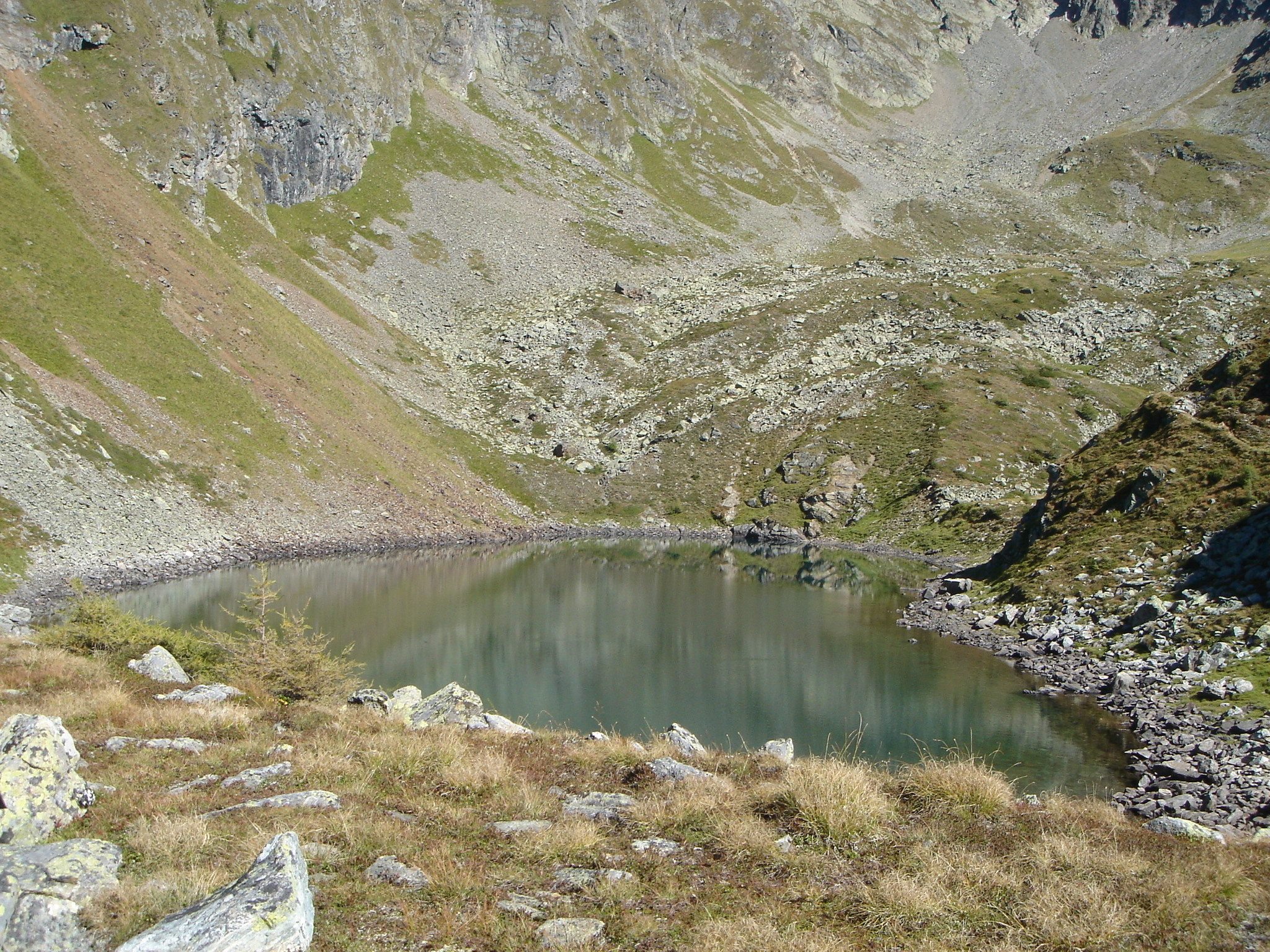
Piendlsee

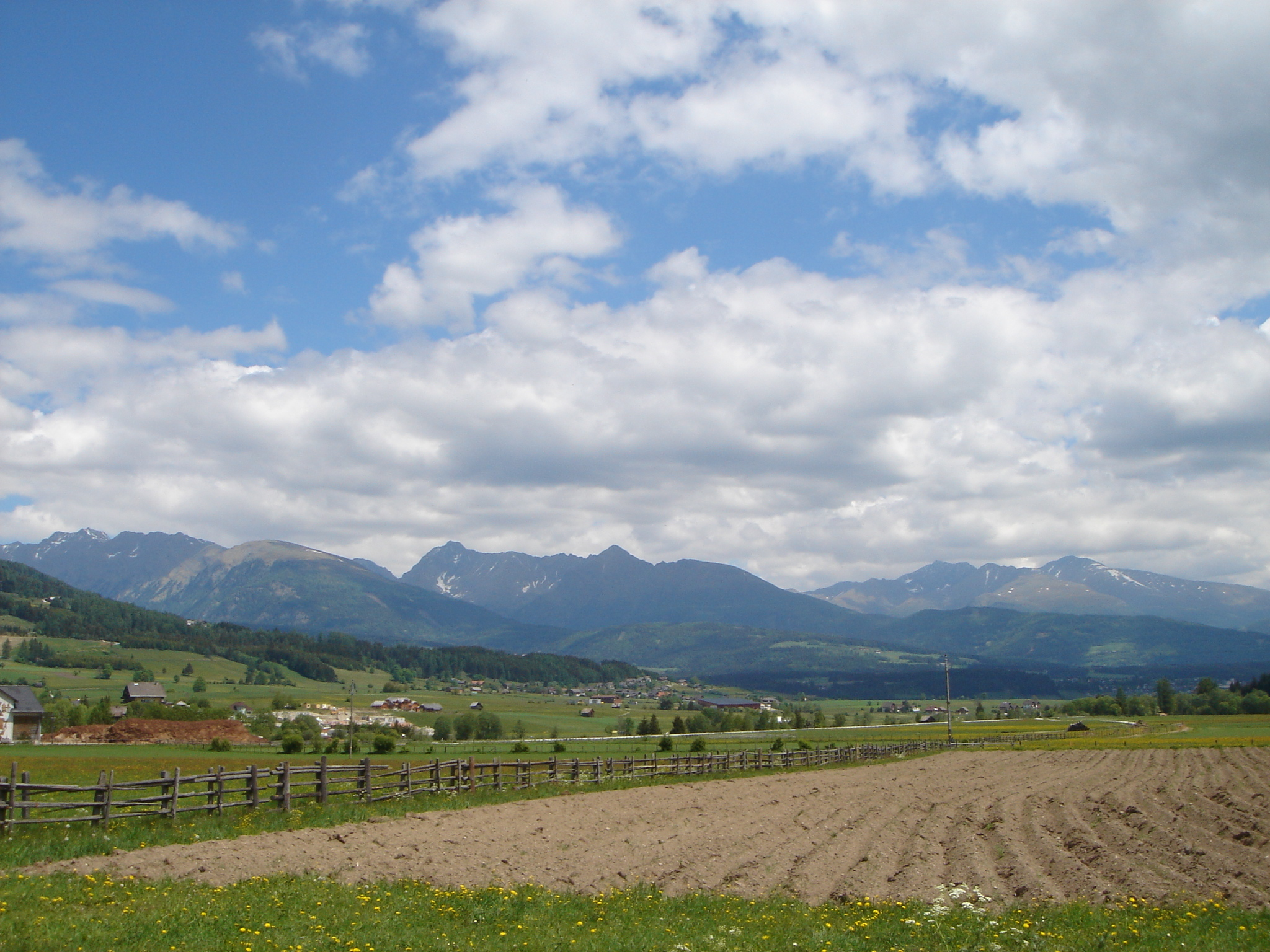
The Kasereck and surrounding peaks - May 2007

== Neighbouring summits ==
- Kreuzhöhe (2,566 m)
- Kampelfenster (2,557 m)
- Wirriegelhöhe (2,600 m)
- Weißhöhe (2,646 m)
- Hochgolling (2,862 m)
- Hocheck (2,638 m)
- Lesshöhe (2,490 m)
- Gensgitsch (2,279 m)
- Gummaberg (2,315 m)
