= Hochwildstelle =

Mountain in Styria, Austria

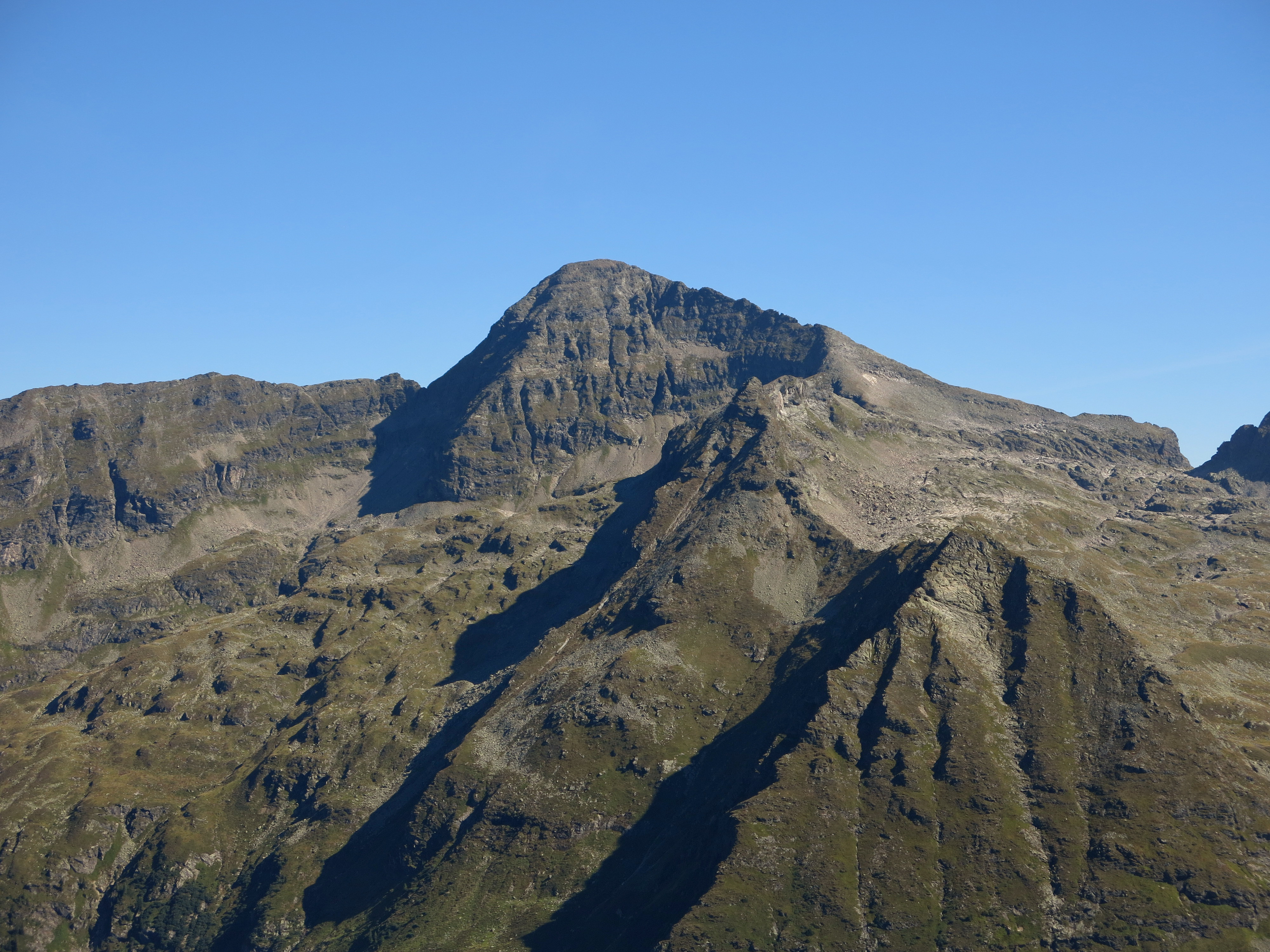
- The Hochwildstelle from the Klafferscharte col to the southwest

Highest point
- Elevation: 2,747 m (AA) (9,012 ft)
- Prominence: 486 m ↓ Rottor
- Isolation: 9.2 km → Hochgolling
- Coordinates: 47°20′06″N 13°49′50″E

Geography
- Location within Austria
- Location: Styria, Austria
- Parent range: Schladming Tauern, Low Tauern

Geology
- Rock type: Migmatic paragneiss

Climbing
- First ascent: 1801 by M. Reiter and companions

The Hochwildstelle or Hohe Wildstelle is a mountain, 2,747 m (AA), and the second highest peak in the Schladming Tauern as well as the highest mountain entirely on Styrian territory in Austria. Its summit is near the tripoint of the three municipalities of Aich, Michaelerberg-Pruggern and Schladming.

The step-like summit block with its mighty rock faces dominates the edge of the mountain range along the Enns Valley, before the range climbs even higher still to the summit of the Hochgolling on the main chain of the Alps.

The knife-edged south arête drops away, immediately south of the summit cross, down to the col of Wildlochscharte (2,488 m) and then climbs again to the summit of the Himmelreich (2,500 m), before dropping into the valley and the Preintaler Hut from the peak of Schneiders (2,328 m).

The ridgeline, which is relatively sharp for a crystalline mountain range runs roughly north to south. The region is very well watered. Even in the vicinity of the very high massif there are several mountain lakes and two large waterfalls.

Two waymarked routes run up the Hochwildstelle:

- From the col of Neualmscharte (2,347 m) via the Kleine Wildstelle and the northwest arête taking 1 hour, UIAA grade I. The Neualmscharte may be reached from either the Hans Wödl Hut or the Preintaler Hut on marked footpaths in about 2 – 3 hours.
- From the col of Wildlochscharte (2,488 m) via the south arête in 1 hour, UIAA grade I. The Wildlochscharte may be reached on signed paths in 2 hours from the Preintaler Hut or the Breitlahn Hut (1,100 m).

The first ascent was by M. Reiter in 1801.

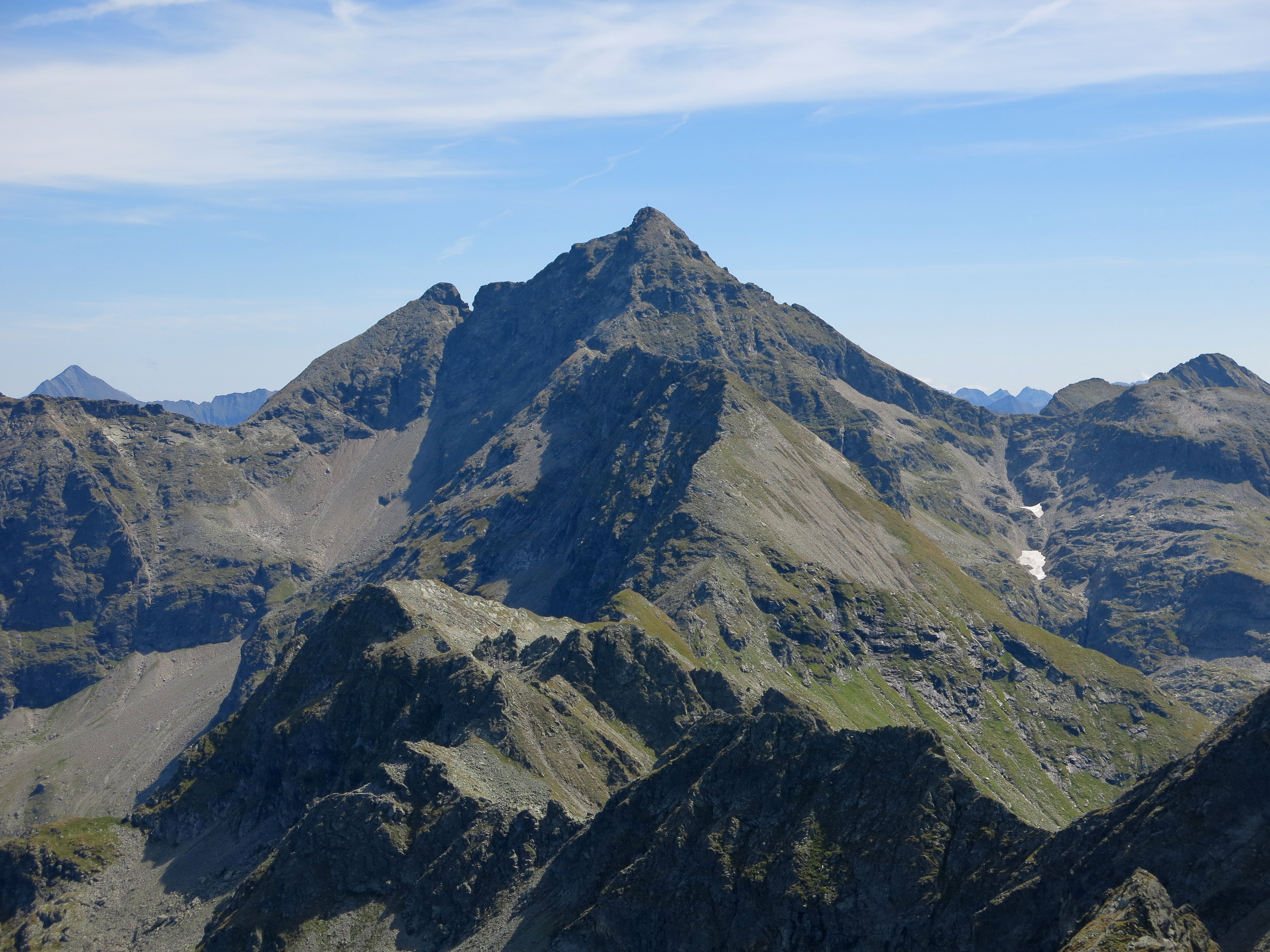
The Hochwildstelle from the northwest (Höchstein)

== Literature ==
- Peter Holl: Alpenvereinsführer Niedere Tauern, Bergverlag Rudolf Rother, 7th revised edition, Munich, 2005, ISBN 3-7633-1267-6.
