= Krakauschatten =

- Former municipality
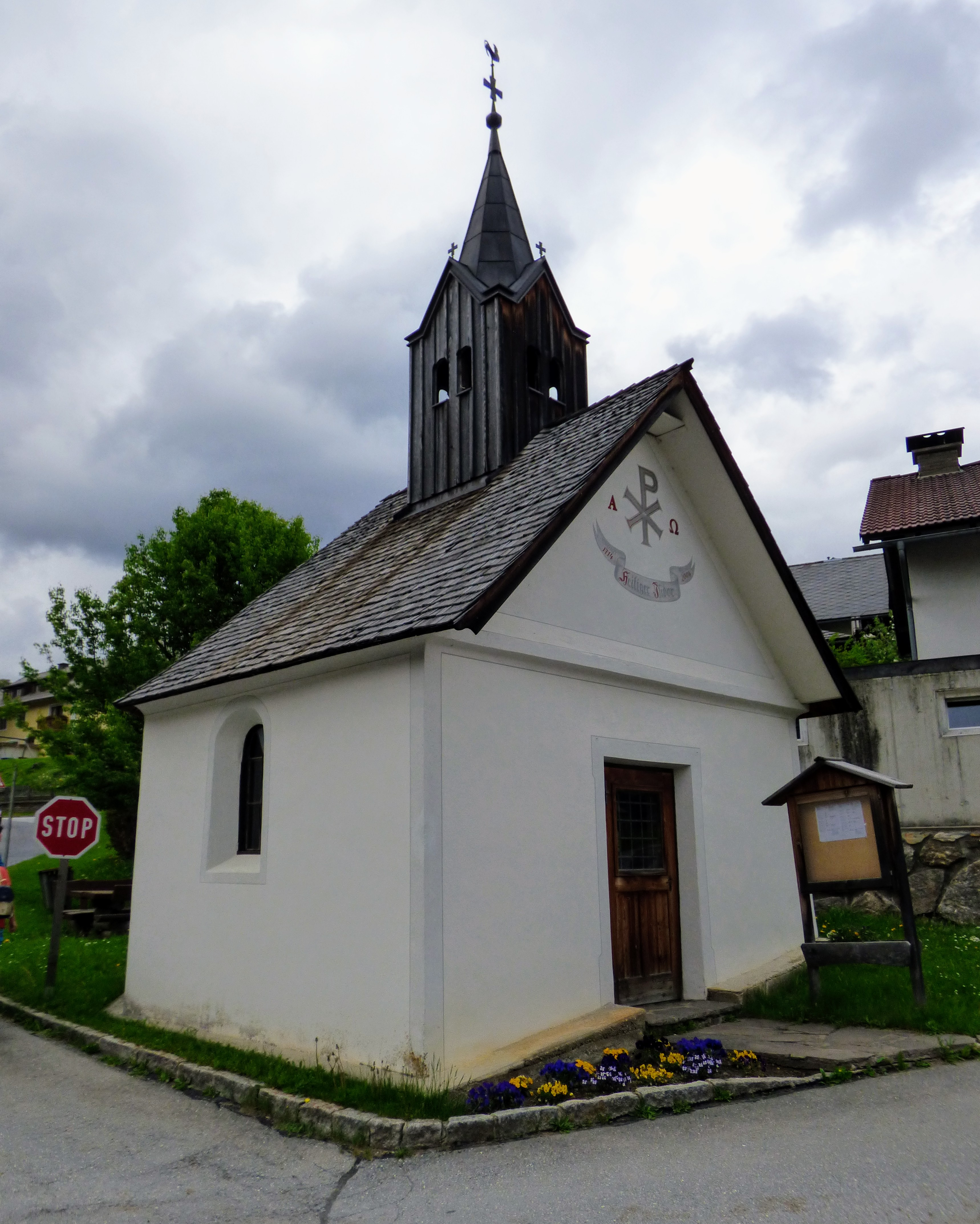
- Chapel in Krakauschatten

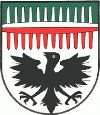
- Coat of arms

- Location within Austria
- Coordinates: 47°10′48″N 13°58′12″E
- Country: Austria
- State: Styria
- District: Murau

Area
  - Total: 13.02 km^{2} (5.03 sq mi)
- Elevation: 1,124 m (3,688 ft)

Population (1 January 2016)
  - Total: 317
  - Density: 24.3/km^{2} (63.1/sq mi)
- Time zone: UTC+1 (CET)
  - Summer (DST): UTC+2 (CEST)
- Postal code: 8854, 8820, 8822
- Area code: 03535
- Vehicle registration: MU
- Website: www.krakauschatten.at

Krakauschatten is a former municipality in the district of Murau in Styria, Austria. Since the 2015 Styria municipal structural reform, it is part of the municipality Krakau.

== Geography ==
Krakauschatten lies on a high plateau in the south of the Schladming Tauern.
