= Krakauhintermühlen =

- Former municipality
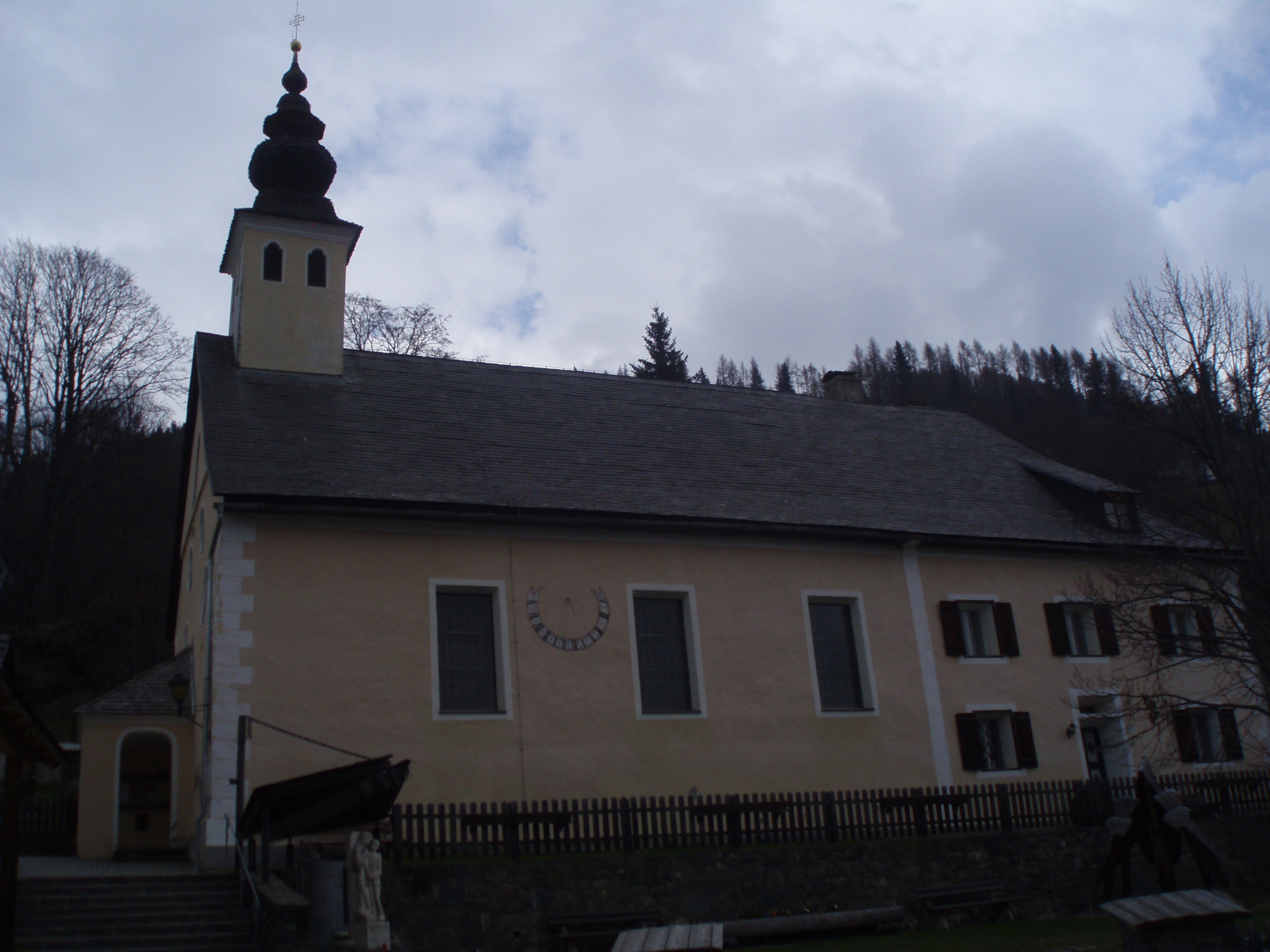
- Krakauhintermühlen parish church

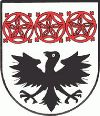
- Coat of arms

- Location within Austria
- Coordinates: 47°10′48″N 13°58′48″E
- Country: Austria
- State: Styria
- District: Murau

Area
  - Total: 80.93 km^{2} (31.25 sq mi)
- Elevation: 1,260 m (4,130 ft)

Population (1 January 2016)
  - Total: 533
  - Density: 6.59/km^{2} (17.1/sq mi)
- Time zone: UTC+1 (CET)
  - Summer (DST): UTC+2 (CEST)
- Postal code: 8854
- Area code: 03535
- Vehicle registration: MU
- Website: www.krakauhintermuehlen.at

Krakauhintermühlen is a former municipality in the district of Murau in Styria, Austria. Since the 2015 Styria municipal structural reform, it is part of the municipality Krakau.

== Geography ==
Krakauhintermühlen lies on a high plateau in the south of the Schladming Tauern.
