= Krakaudorf =

- Former municipality
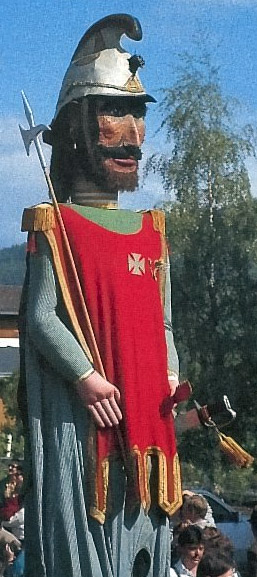

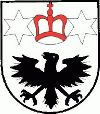
- Coat of arms

- Location within Austria
- Coordinates: 47°10′00″N 14°01′00″E
- Country: Austria
- State: Styria
- District: Murau

Area
  - Total: 29.68 km^{2} (11.46 sq mi)
- Elevation: 1,173 m (3,848 ft)

Population (1 January 2016)
  - Total: 645
  - Density: 21.7/km^{2} (56.3/sq mi)
- Time zone: UTC+1 (CET)
  - Summer (DST): UTC+2 (CEST)
- Postal code: 8854
- Area code: 03535
- Vehicle registration: MU
- Website: www.krakaudorf.at

Krakaudorf is a former municipality in the district of Murau in Styria, Austria. Since the 2015 Styria municipal structural reform, it is part of the municipality Krakau.

== Geography ==
Krakaudorf lies on a high plateau in the south of the Schladming Tauern.
