= Ingeringsee =

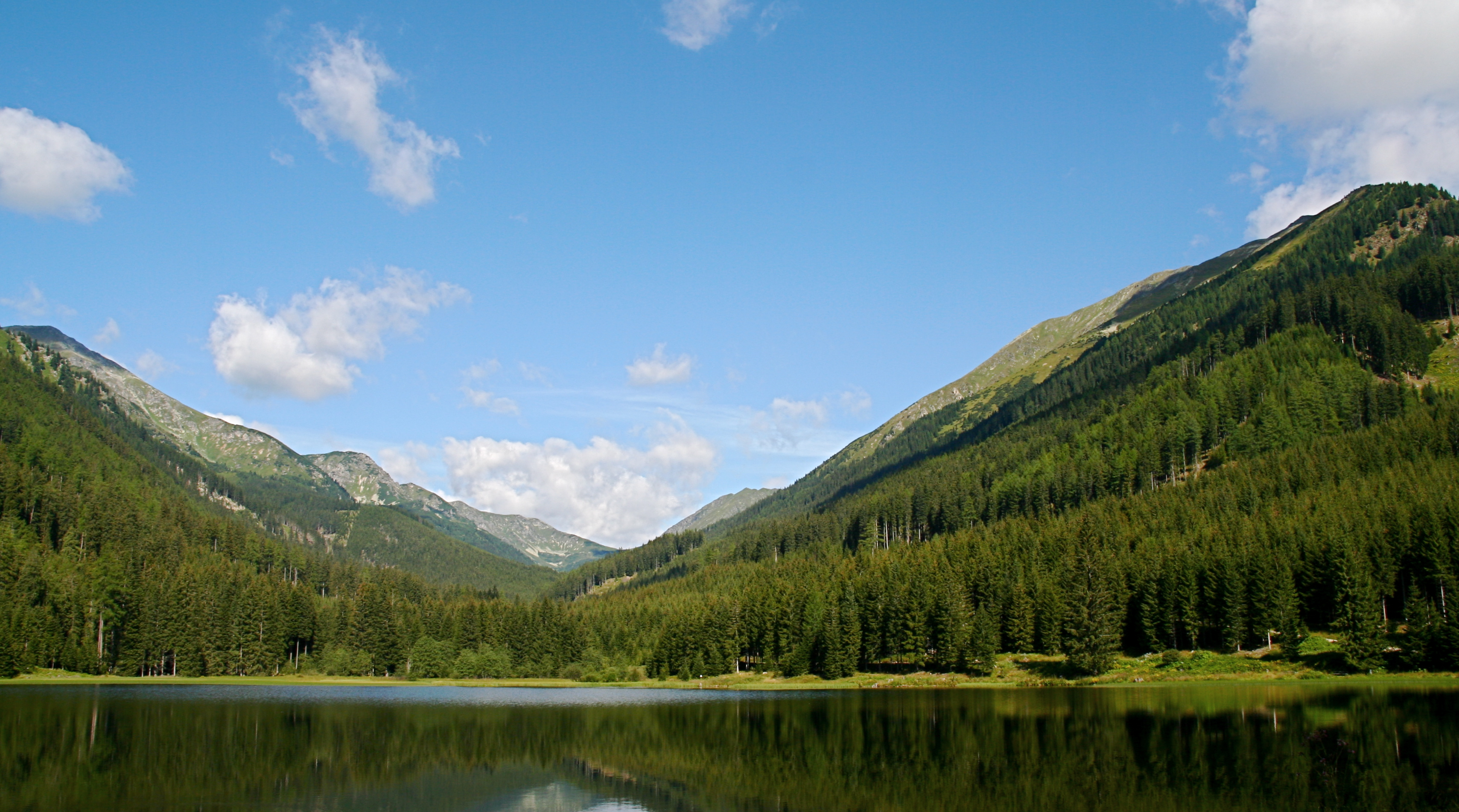

- Location within Austria
- Location: Hochreichhart, Seckauer Tauern, Steiermark
- Coordinates: 47.343889°N 14.658333°E
- Lake type: Mountain lake
- Basin countries: Austria
- Surface elevation: 1,211 m (3,973 ft)

Ingeringsee is a lake of Steiermark, Austria. The lake is located at approximately 1200 meters above sea level and is situated among mountains.
