= Pruggern =

- Former municipality
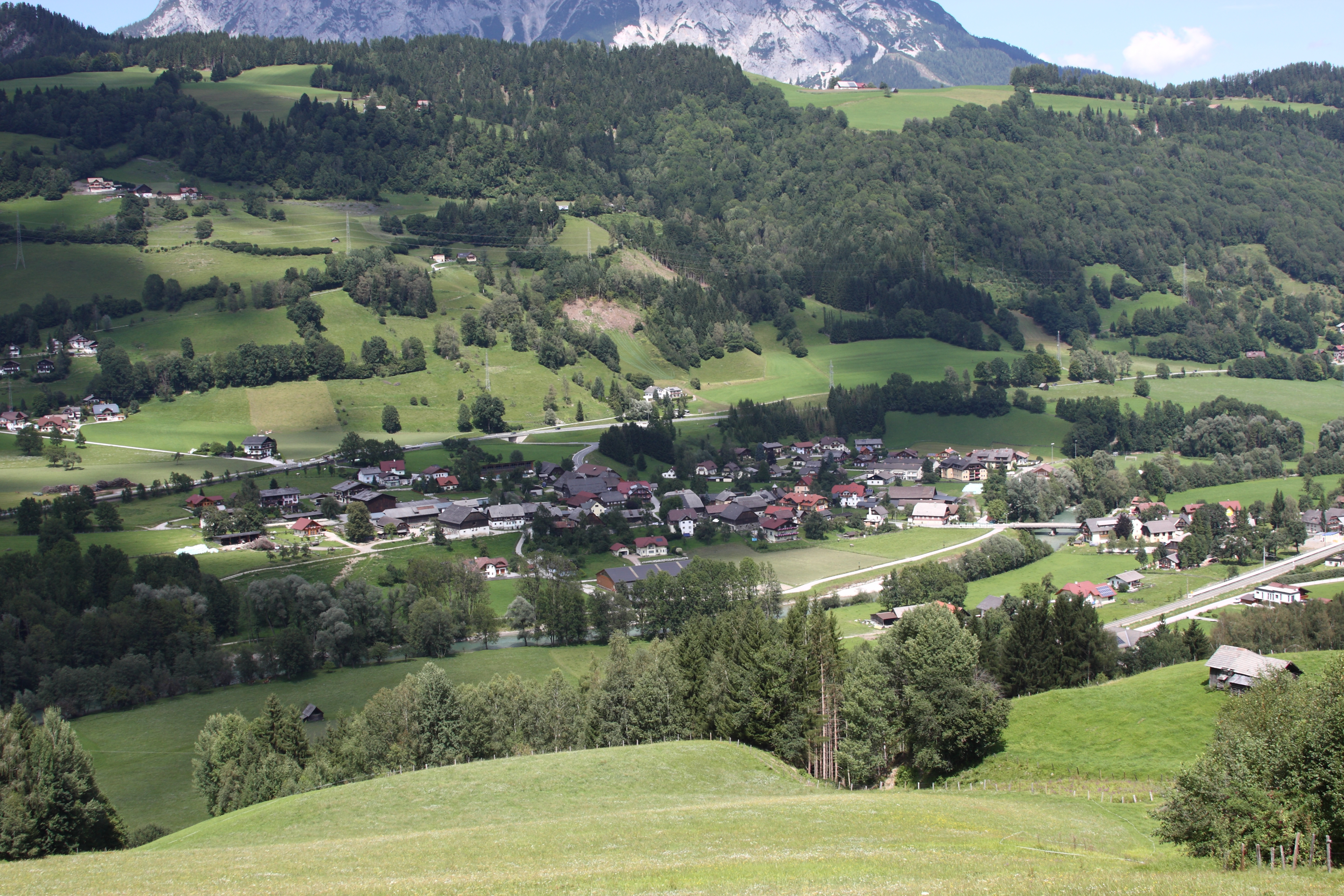
- View of Pruggern

- Coat of arms

- Location within Austria
- Coordinates: 47°25′24″N 13°52′31″E
- Country: Austria
- State: Styria
- District: Liezen

Area
  - Total: 21.74 km^{2} (8.39 sq mi)
- Elevation: 690 m (2,260 ft)

Population (1 January 2016)
  - Total: 623
  - Density: 28.7/km^{2} (74.2/sq mi)
- Time zone: UTC+1 (CET)
  - Summer (DST): UTC+2 (CEST)
- Postal code: 8965
- Area code: 03685
- Vehicle registration: GB
- Website: www.pruggern.at

Pruggern is a former municipality in the district of Liezen in the Austrian state of Styria. Since the 2015 Styria municipal structural reform, it is part of the municipality Michaelerberg-Pruggern.

== Geography ==
Pruggern lies in the Enns valley between Gröbming and Aich east of Schladming and not far from the entrance to the Sölk Pass.
