= Geierhaupt =

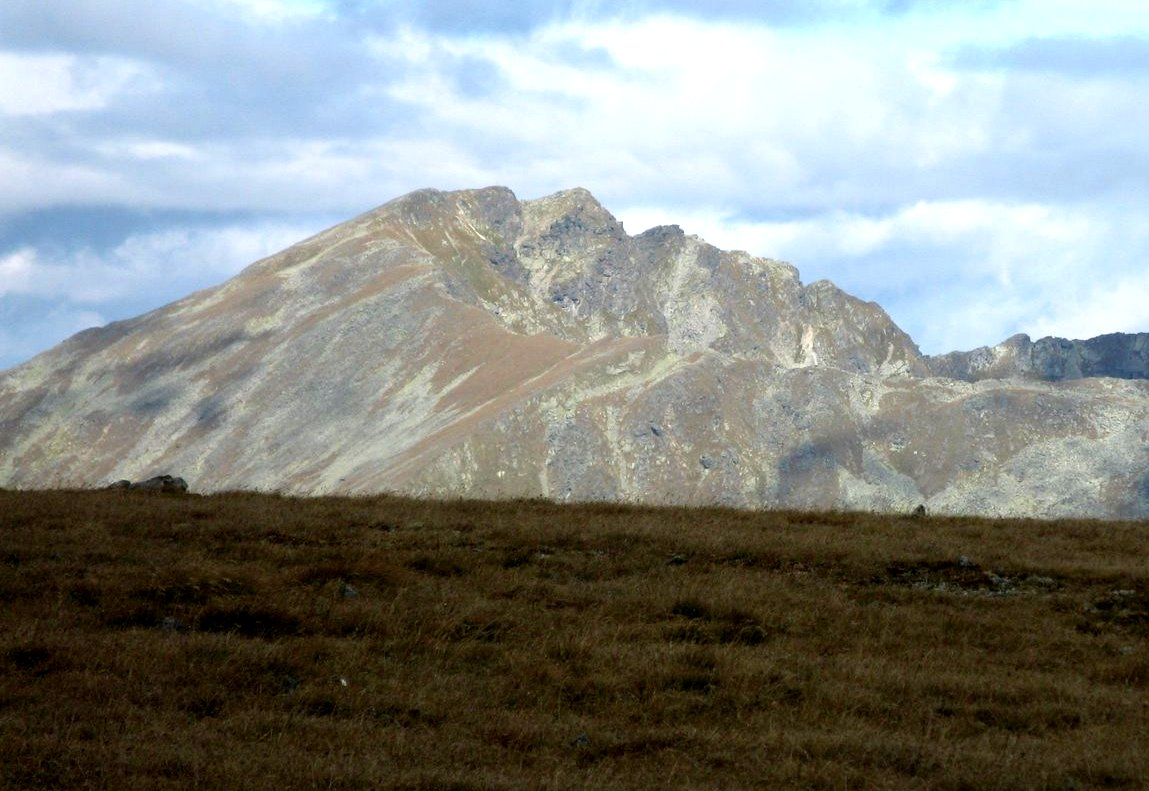
- Geierhaupt

Highest point
- Elevation: 2,417 m (7,930 ft)
- Prominence: 1,172 m (3,845 ft)
- Coordinates: 47°22′N 14°38′E

Geography
- Location within Alps
- Location: Styria, Austria
- Parent range: Lower Tauern

Geierhaupt (2,417 m) is a mountain of the Lower Tauern in Styria, Austria. It is the highest mountain of the Seckau Tauern sub group.

== Pictures ==
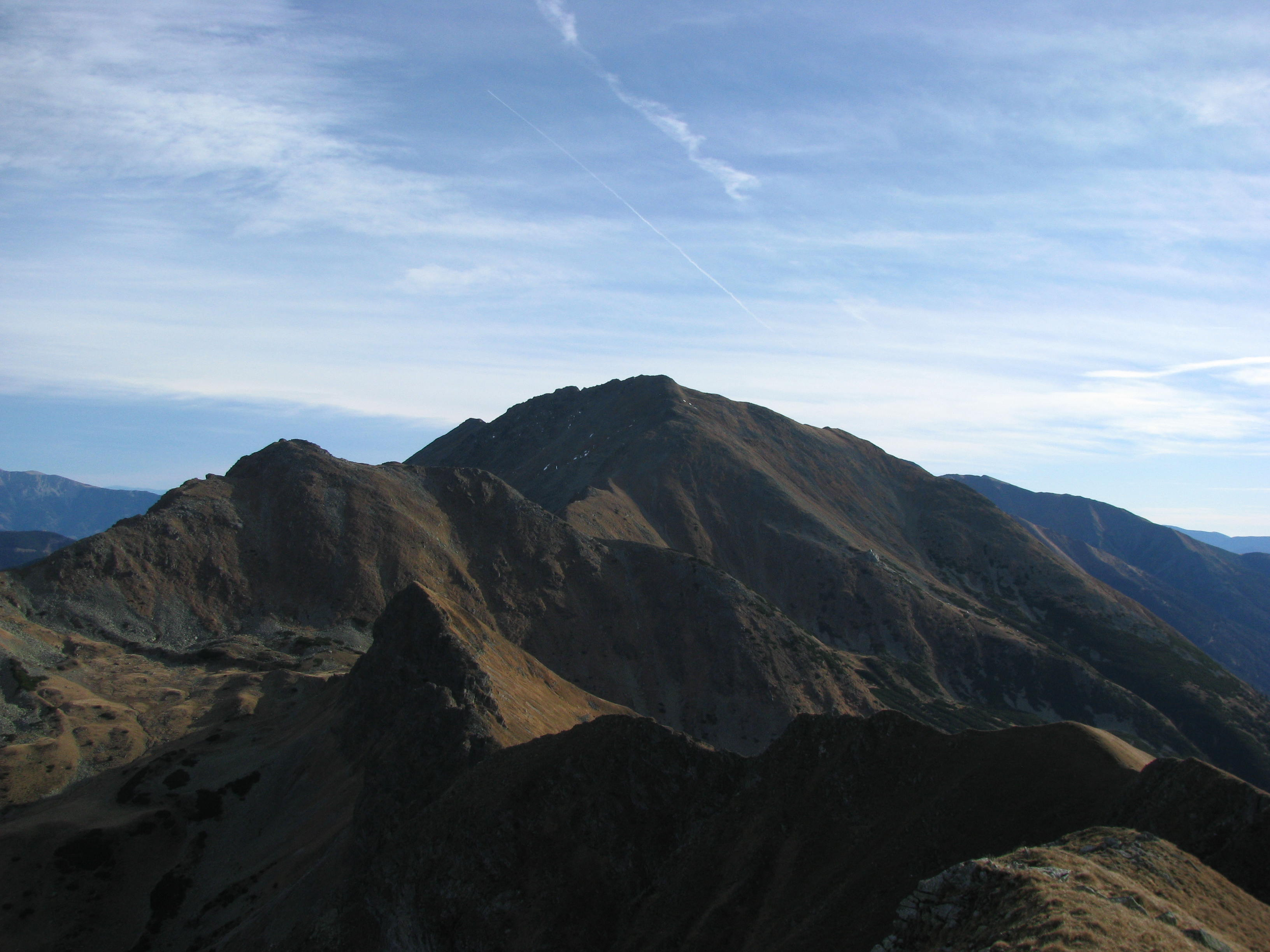
Geierhaupt West Face (from Kettentalkogel)

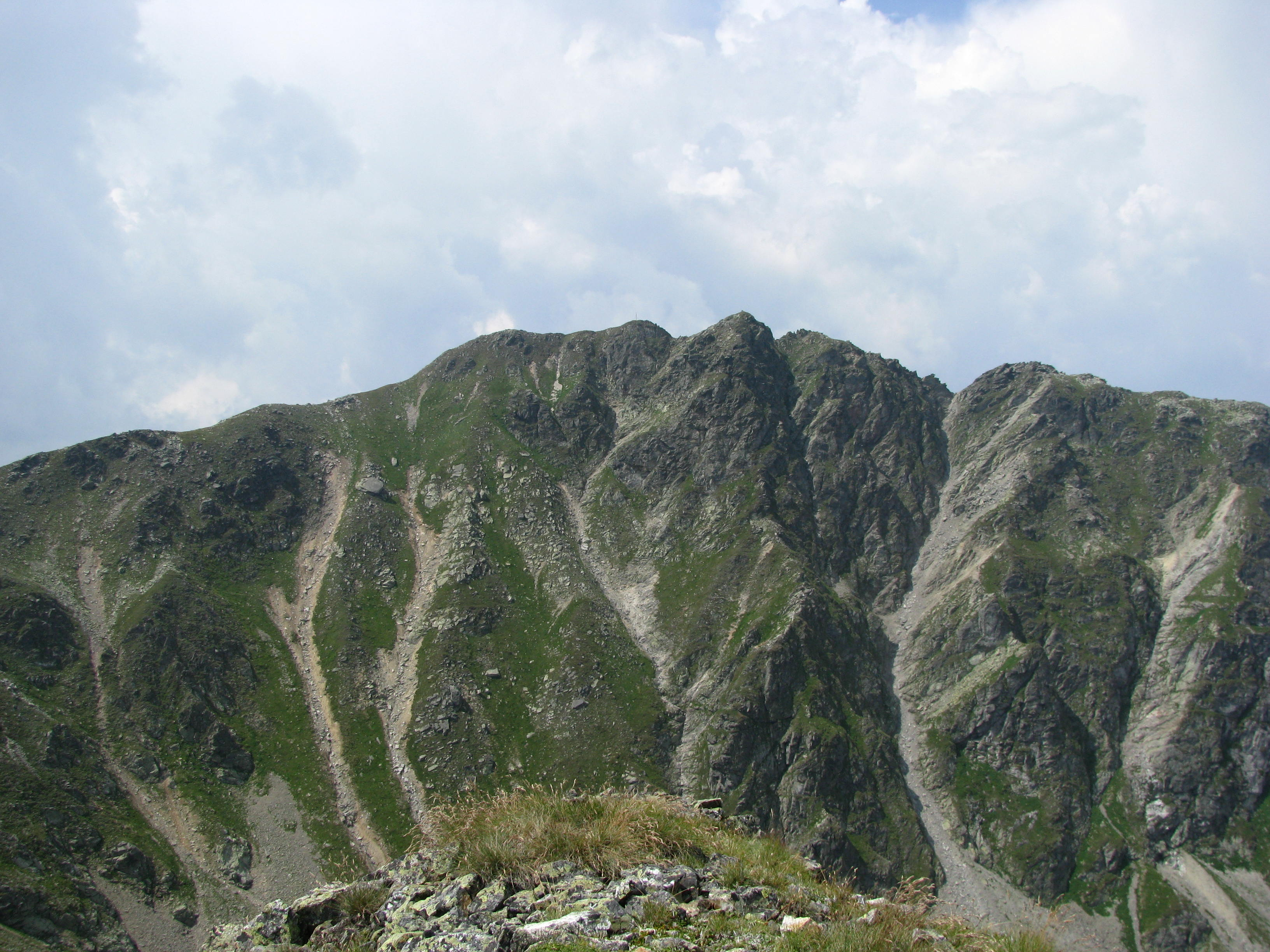
Geierhaupt South-East Face (from Höllkogel)

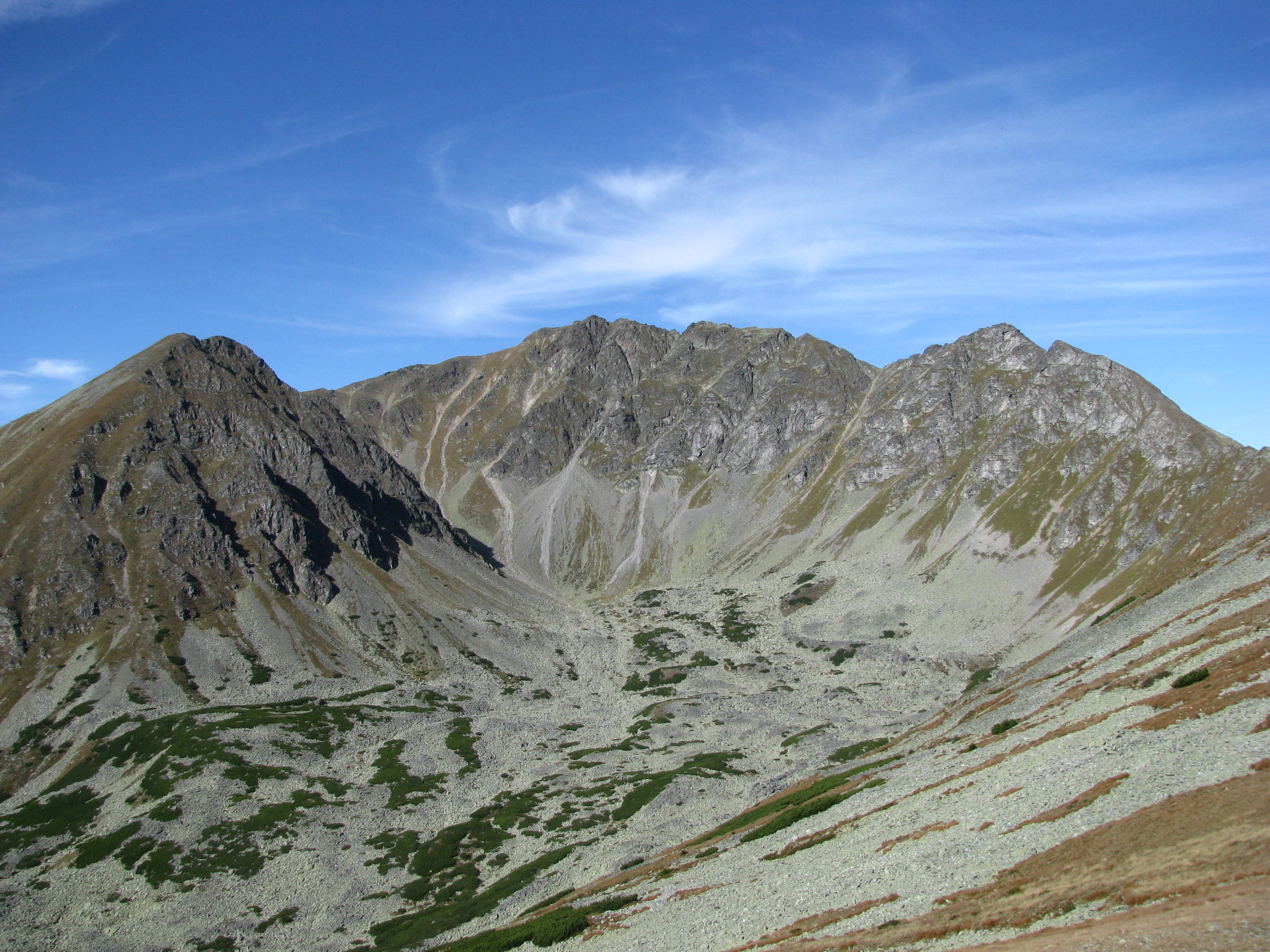
Hölltal with Geierhaupt above (from Weißsattel)

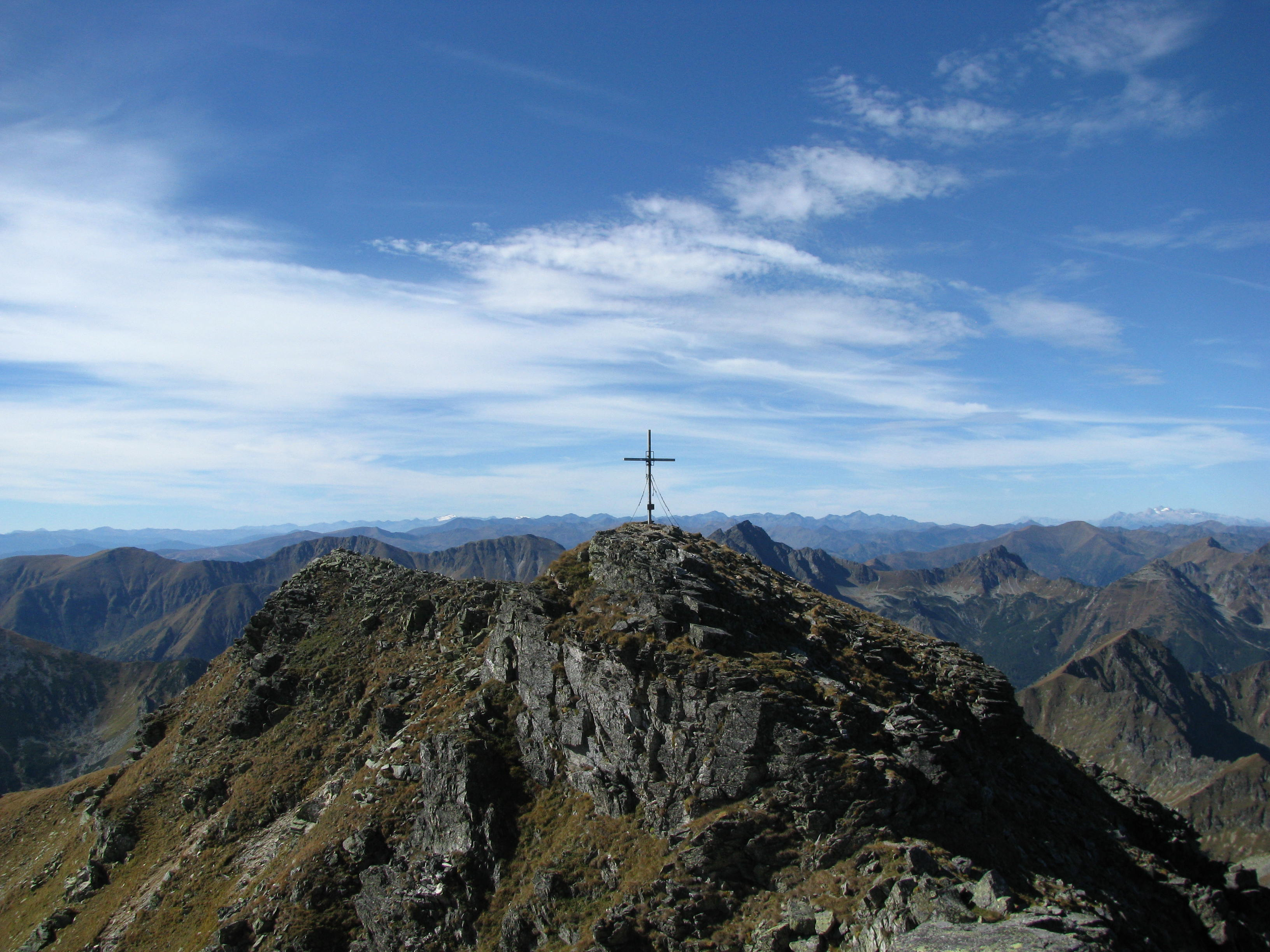
Summit of Mt. Geierhaupt
