= Schladming Tauern =

Subrange of the Austrian Central Alps

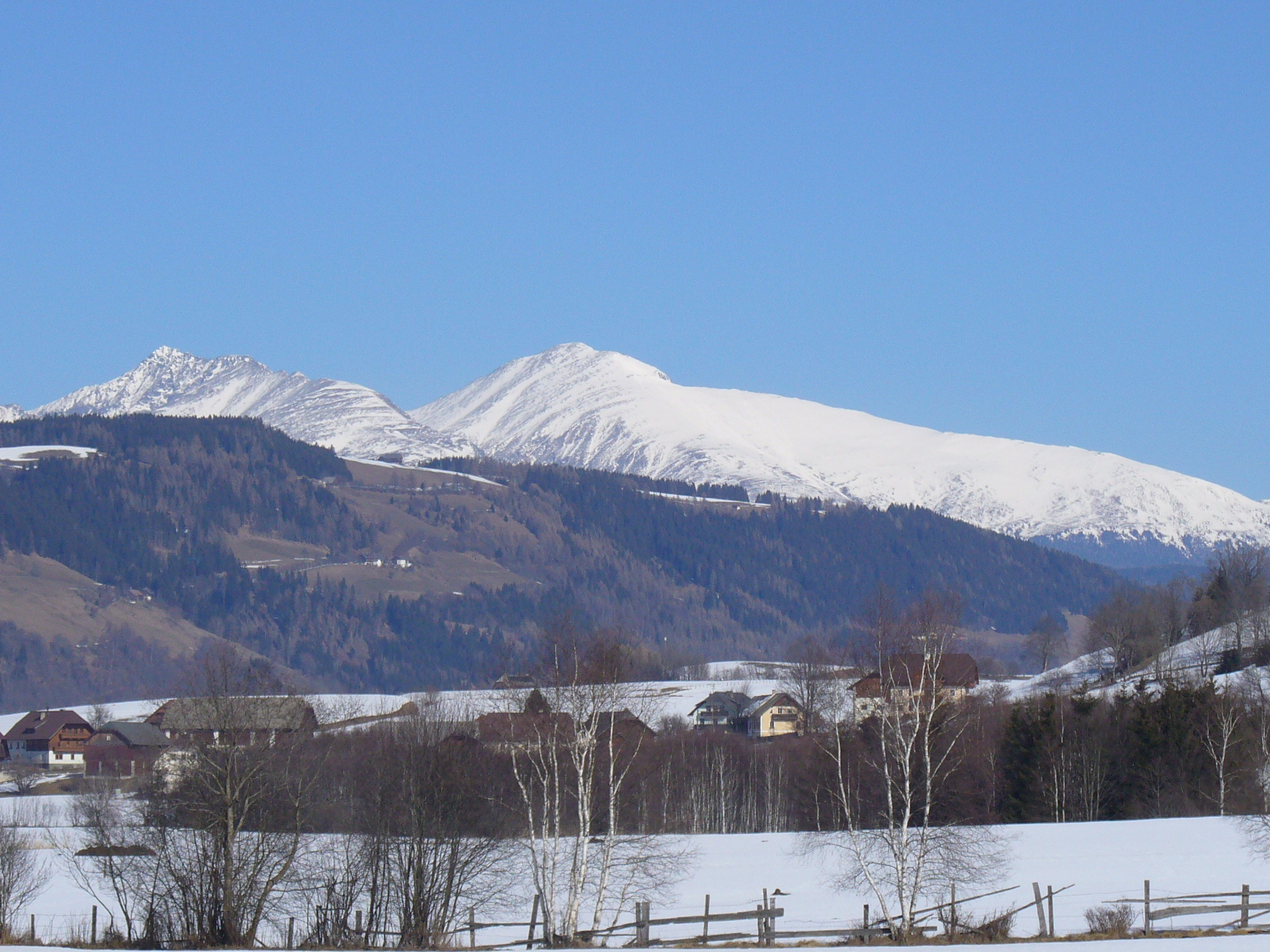
- The Preber

Highest point
- Peak: Hochgolling
- Elevation: 2,862 m above sea level (AA)

Geography
- Location within Alps
- Location: Styria, Salzburg, Austria
- Range coordinates: 47°16′00″N 13°45′42″E

The Schladming Tauern (German: Schladminger Tauern) are a subrange of the Austrian Central Alps within the Eastern Alps. Together with the Radstadt Tauern, the Rottenmann and Wölz Tauern and the Seckau Tauern the Schladming Tauern form the major range known as the Low Tauern. The mountains are located in Austria in the federal states of Salzburg and Styria. Its highest peak, at 2,862 m is the Hochgolling.

== Location ==
The Schladming Tauern are located in the middle of the Low Tauern between the Sölk Pass in the east and the top of the Tauern Pass in the west. The name comes from the town of Schladming in the Enns valley.

=== Neighbouring ranges ===
The Schladming Tauern border on the following other mountain ranges of the Alps:

- Rottenmann and Wölz Tauern (to the east)
- Nock Mountains (to the south)
- Radstadt Tauern (to the west)
- Salzburg Slate Alps (to the northwest)
- Dachstein Mountains (to the north)

== Subdivision ==
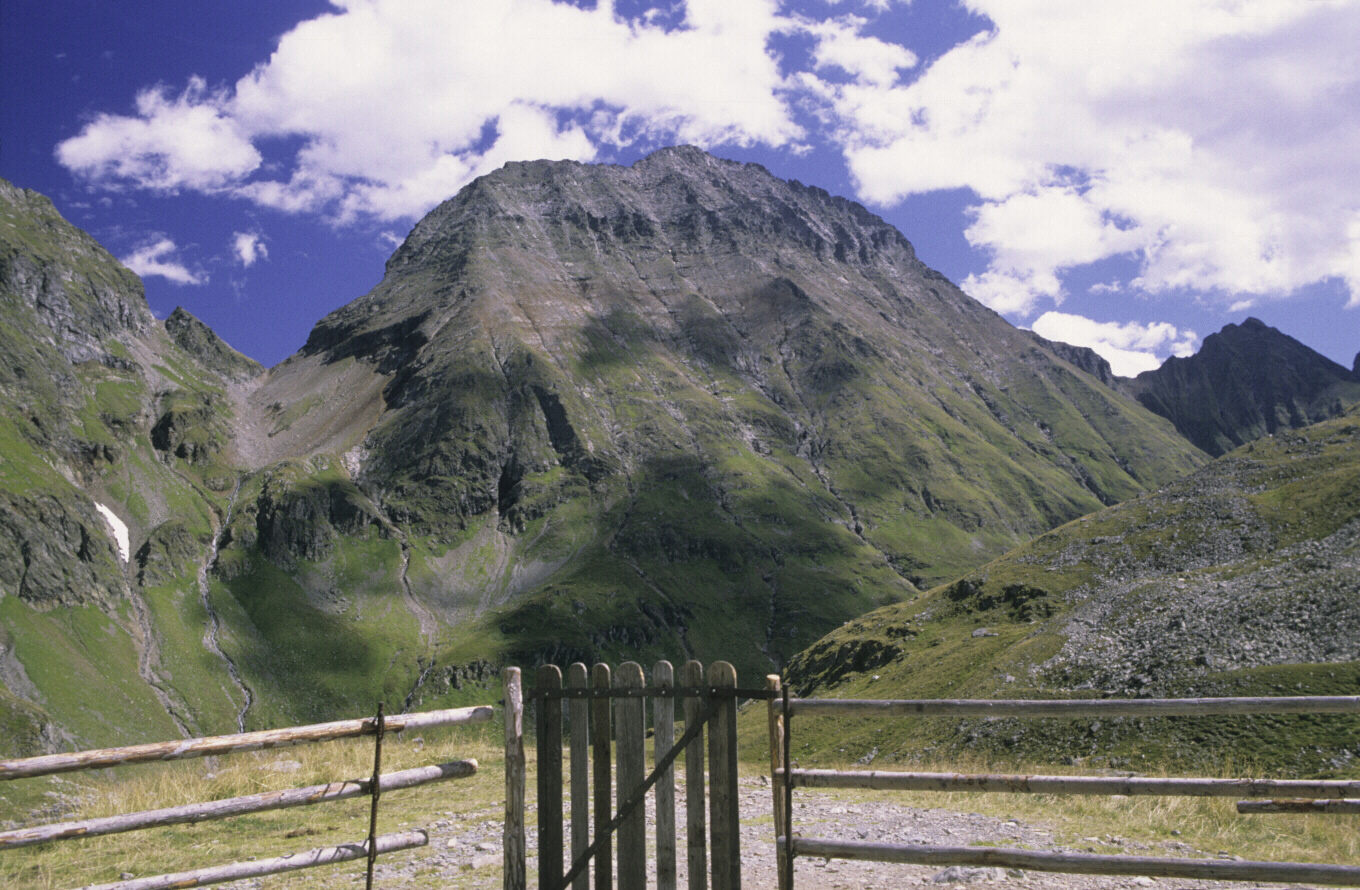
The Hochgolling from the Landawirsee Hut

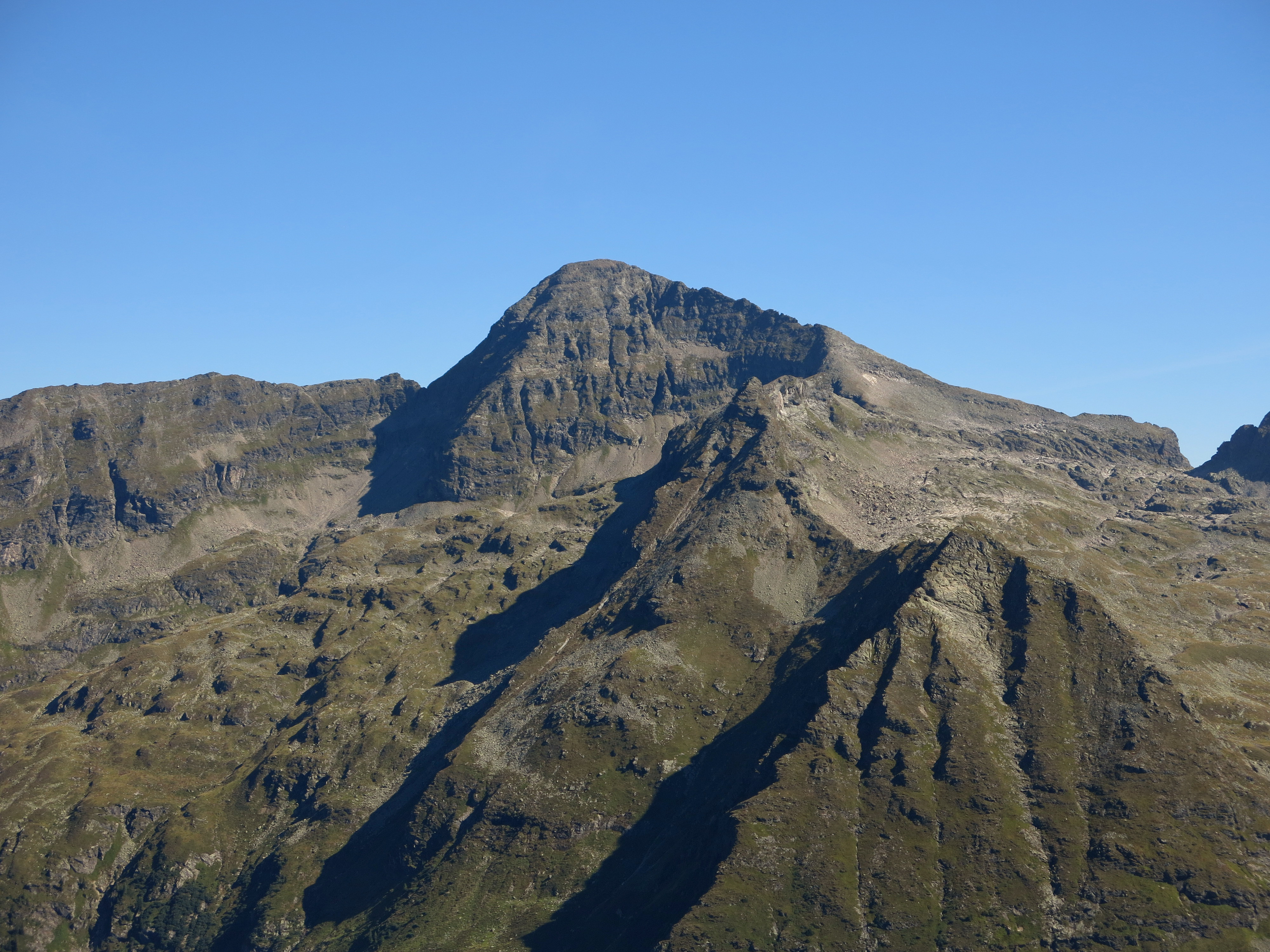
Hochwildstelle from southwest

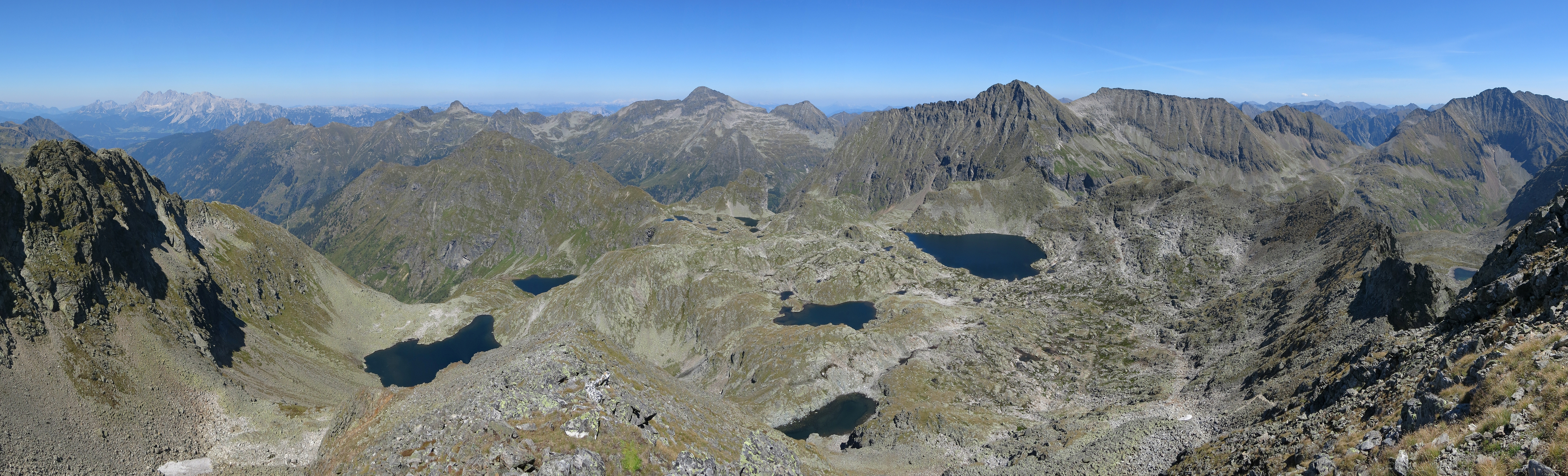
The Klafferkessel

The Schladming Tauern are divided into six subgroups which are (from west to east), the:

- Seekarspitze Group between the Radstadt Tauern (1,738 m (AA)) and the Oberhütten Saddle (1,866 m (AA)):
  - Großes Gurpitscheck (2,526 m (AA))
  - Gamskarlspitze (2,411 m (AA))
  - Seekarspitze (2,350 m (AA))
- Kalkspitze Group between the Oberhütten Saddle (1,866 m (AA)) and the Lignitzhöhe (2,205 m (AA)) :
  - Hundstein (2,614 m (AA))
  - Vetternspitzen (2,524 m (AA))
  - Styrian and Lungauer Kalkspitze (2,459 m (AA))
- Hochgolling Group between Lignitzhöhe (2,205 m (AA)) and Waldhorntörl (2,283 m (AA)):
  - Hochgolling (2,862 m (AA))
  - Kasereck (2,740 m (AA))
  - Elendberg (2,672 m (AA))
  - Zwerfenberg (2,642 m (AA))
  - Hocheck (2,638 m (AA))
  - Greifenberg (2,618 m (AA))
- Hochwildstellen Group between the Waldhorntörl (2,283 m (AA)) and the Lanschitzscharte (2,345 m (AA)) :
  - Hochwildstelle (2,747 m (AA))
  - Waldhorn (2,702 m (AA))
  - Deichselspitze (2,684 m (AA))
  - Hohes Schareck (2,575 m (AA))
- Preber Group between the Lanschitzscharte (2,345 m (AA)) and the Hubenbauertörl (2,051 m (AA)) :
  - Roteck (2,742 m (AA))
  - Preber (2,740 m (AA))
  - Predigtstuhl (2,543 m (AA))
- Knallstein Group between the Hubenbauertörl (2,051 m (AA)) and the Sölk Pass (1,788 m (AA)):
  - Großer Knallstein (2,599 m (AA))
  - Ruprechtseck (2,591 m (AA))

== Literature ==
- Peter Holl: Alpenvereinsführer Niedere Tauern, Bergverlag Rudolf Rother, Munich, 1983. ISBN 3-7633-1231-5
