= Krakau =

- Municipality
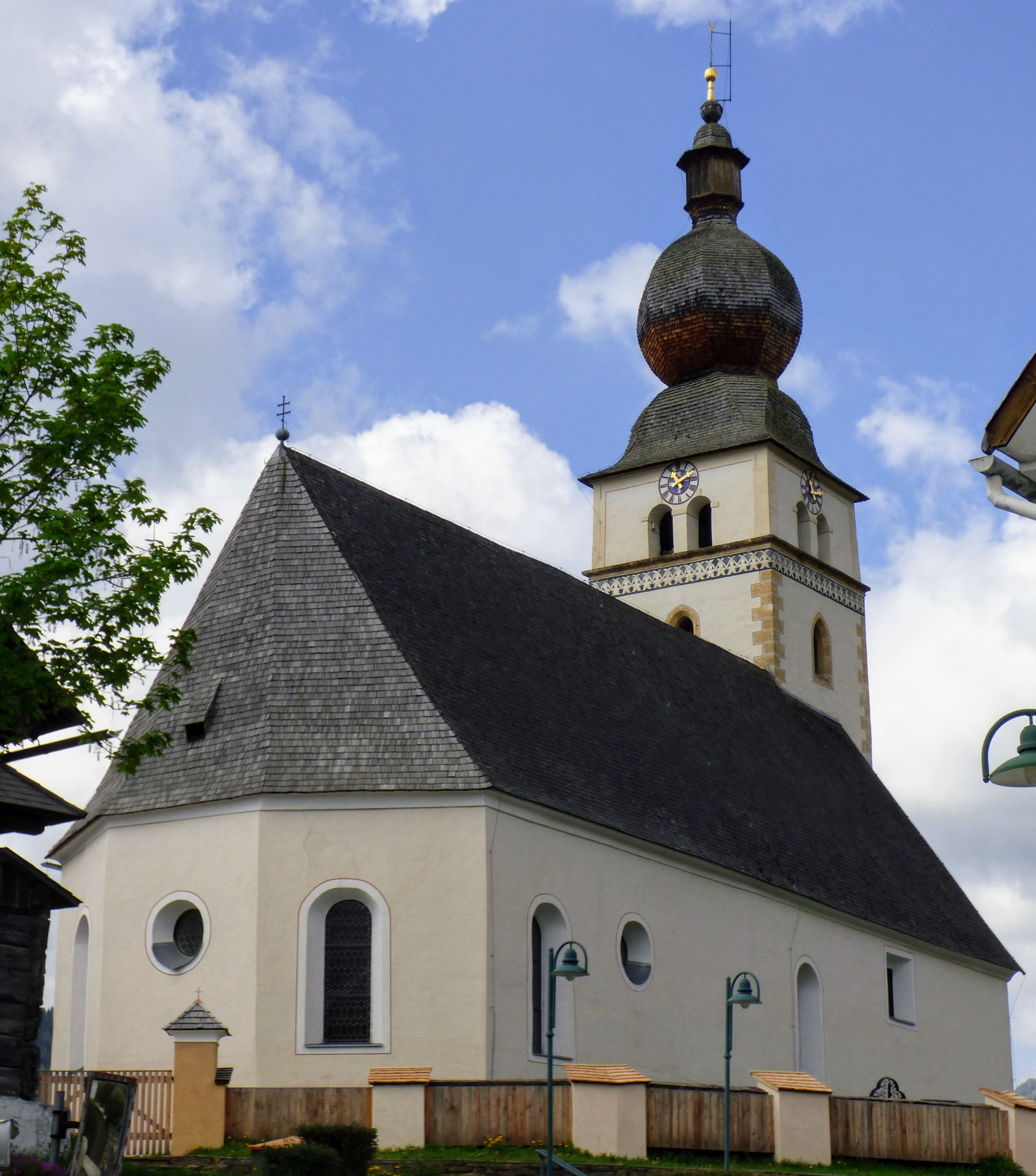
- Church of Saint Oswald

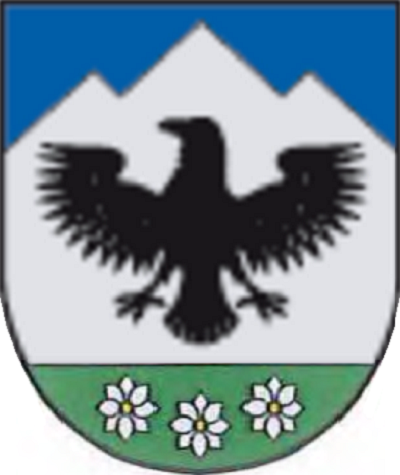
- Coat of arms

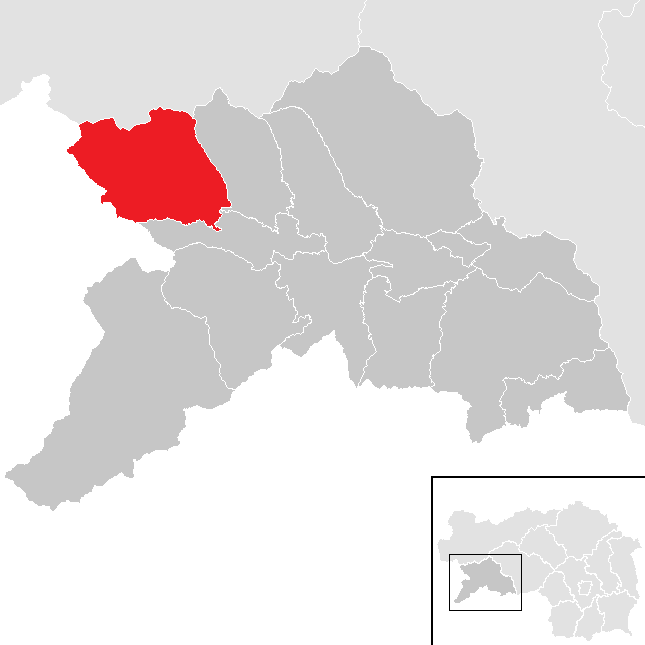
- Location within Murau district

- Location within Austria
- Coordinates: 47°10′00″N 14°01′00″E
- Country: Austria
- State: Styria
- District: Murau

Government
  - Mayor: Gerhard Stolz (ÖVP)

Area
  - Total: 123.45 km^{2} (47.66 sq mi)
- Elevation: 1,173 m (3,848 ft)

Population (2018-01-01)
  - Total: 1,419
  - Density: 11.49/km^{2} (29.77/sq mi)
- Time zone: UTC+1 (CET)
  - Summer (DST): UTC+2 (CEST)
- Postal code: 8854
- Area code: +43 3535
- Vehicle registration: MU
- Website: www.krakau.at

Krakau is a municipality in the district of Murau in Styria, Austria. It was created on 1 January 2015 when the municipalities of Krakaudorf, Krakauhintermühlen and Krakauschatten were merged.

== Geography ==
Krakau lies on a high plateau in the south of the Schladming Tauern.

== Politics ==
The municipal assembly (Gemeinderat) consists of 15 members. Since the 2025 local elections, it is made up of the following parties:

- Austrian People's Party (ÖVP): 10 seats
- Social Democratic Party of Austria (SPÖ): 4 seats
- Freedom Party of Austria (FPÖ): 1 seat
