= Michaelerberg =

- Former municipality
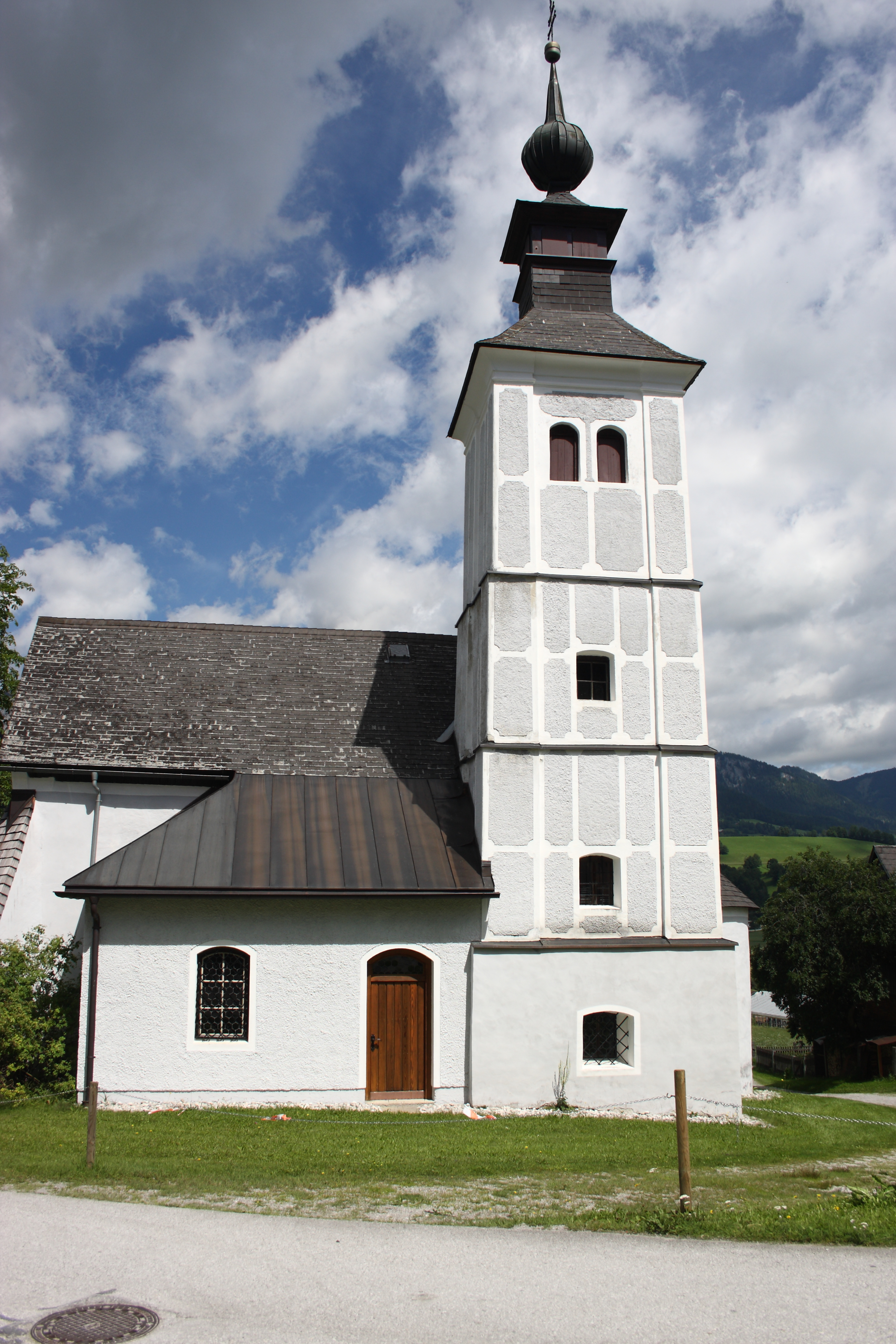
- Catholic church in Michaelerberg

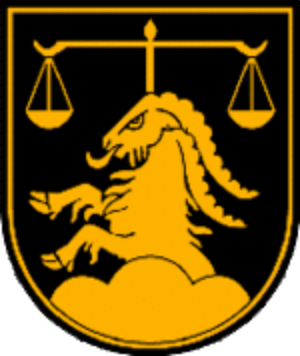
- Coat of arms

- Location within Austria
- Coordinates: 47°24′36″N 13°53′24″E
- Country: Austria
- State: Styria
- District: Liezen

Area
  - Total: 26.08 km^{2} (10.07 sq mi)
- Elevation: 696 m (2,283 ft)

Population (1 January 2016)
  - Total: 551
  - Density: 21.1/km^{2} (54.7/sq mi)
- Time zone: UTC+1 (CET)
  - Summer (DST): UTC+2 (CEST)
- Postal code: 8962
- Area code: 03685
- Vehicle registration: GB
- Website: www.michaelerberg.at

Michaelerberg is a former municipality in the district of Liezen in Styria, Austria. Since the 2015 Styria municipal structural reform, it is part of the municipality Michaelerberg-Pruggern.
