= Lower Tauern =

Mountain range in Austria

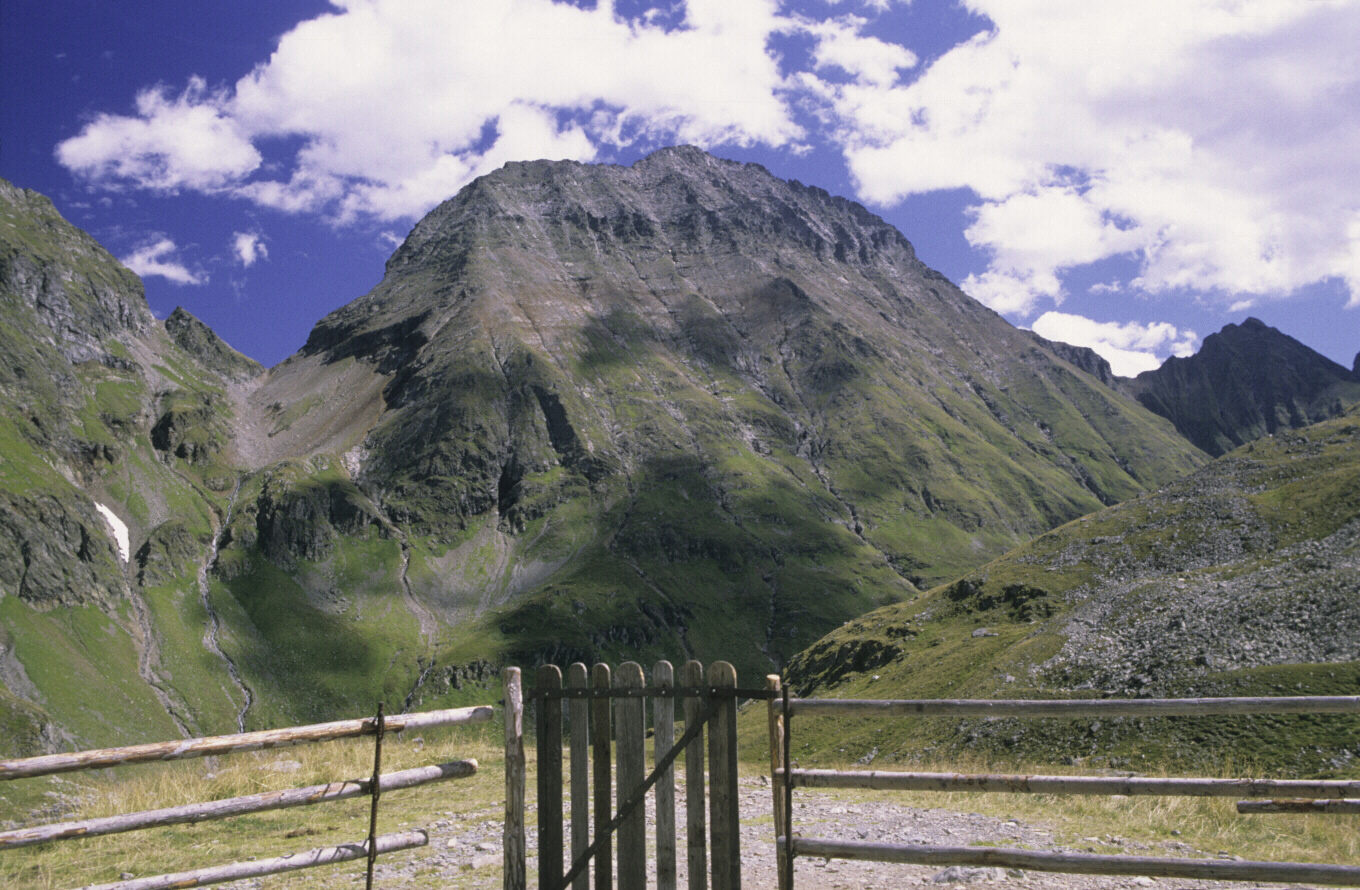
- Hochgolling

Highest point
- Peak: Hochgolling
- Elevation: 2,863 m (9,393 ft)
- Coordinates: 47°16′0″N 13°45′42″E

Naming
- Native name: Niedere Tauern (German)

Geography
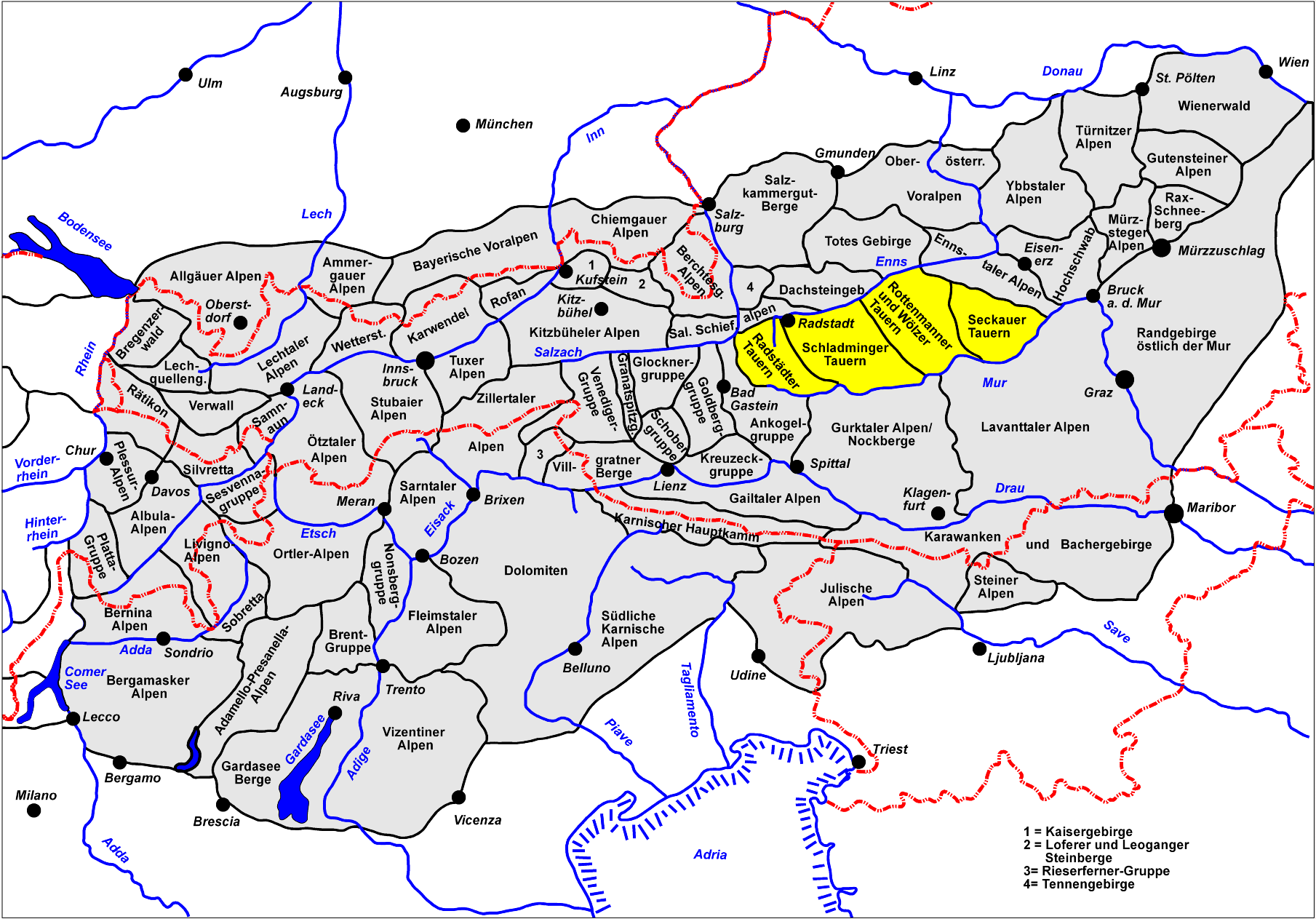
- Location within the Eastern Alps
- Country: Austria
- States: Salzburg; Styria
- Range coordinates: 47°18′N 14°0′E
- Parent range: Central Eastern Alps
- Borders on: Western Tauern Alps; Northern Salzburg Alps; Salzkammergut and Upper Austria Alps; Northern Styrian Alps; Styrian Prealps; Carinthian-Styrian Alps

Geology
- Orogeny: Alpine orogeny

The Lower Tauern or Niedere Tauern are a mountain range of the Central Eastern Alps, in the Austrian states of Salzburg and Styria.

For the etymology of the name, see Tauern.

== Geography ==
The range forms a part of the main chain of the Alps. The highest peak of the Lower Tauern is the Hochgolling, part of the Schladming Tauern, at 2,863 m (9,393 ft).

Important mountain pass roads include Radstädter Tauern Pass (1,738 m (5,702 ft)), Sölk Pass (1,788 m (5,866 ft)), and Triebener Tauern Pass (1,274 m (4,180 ft)). The range is also crossed by the Tauern Autobahn (A10) through the Tauern Road Tunnel.

=== Borders ===
In the west and south the Murtörl mountain pass and the River Mur separate them from the Hohe Tauern mountain range, while in the east and north the River Enns and the Schober Pass marks the border to the Northern Limestone Alps.

=== Alpine Club classification ===
According to the Alpine Club classification of the Eastern Alps, the Lower Tauern may be divided into four subgroups (from west to east):

- Radstadt Tauern (45a)
- Schladming Tauern (45b)
- Rottenmann and Wölz Tauern (45c)
- Seckau Tauern (45d).

The four groups listed above (the Radstadt Tauern, Schladming Tauern, Rottenmann and Wölz Tauern and Seckau Alps) are considered Alpine subsections.

== Notable summits ==
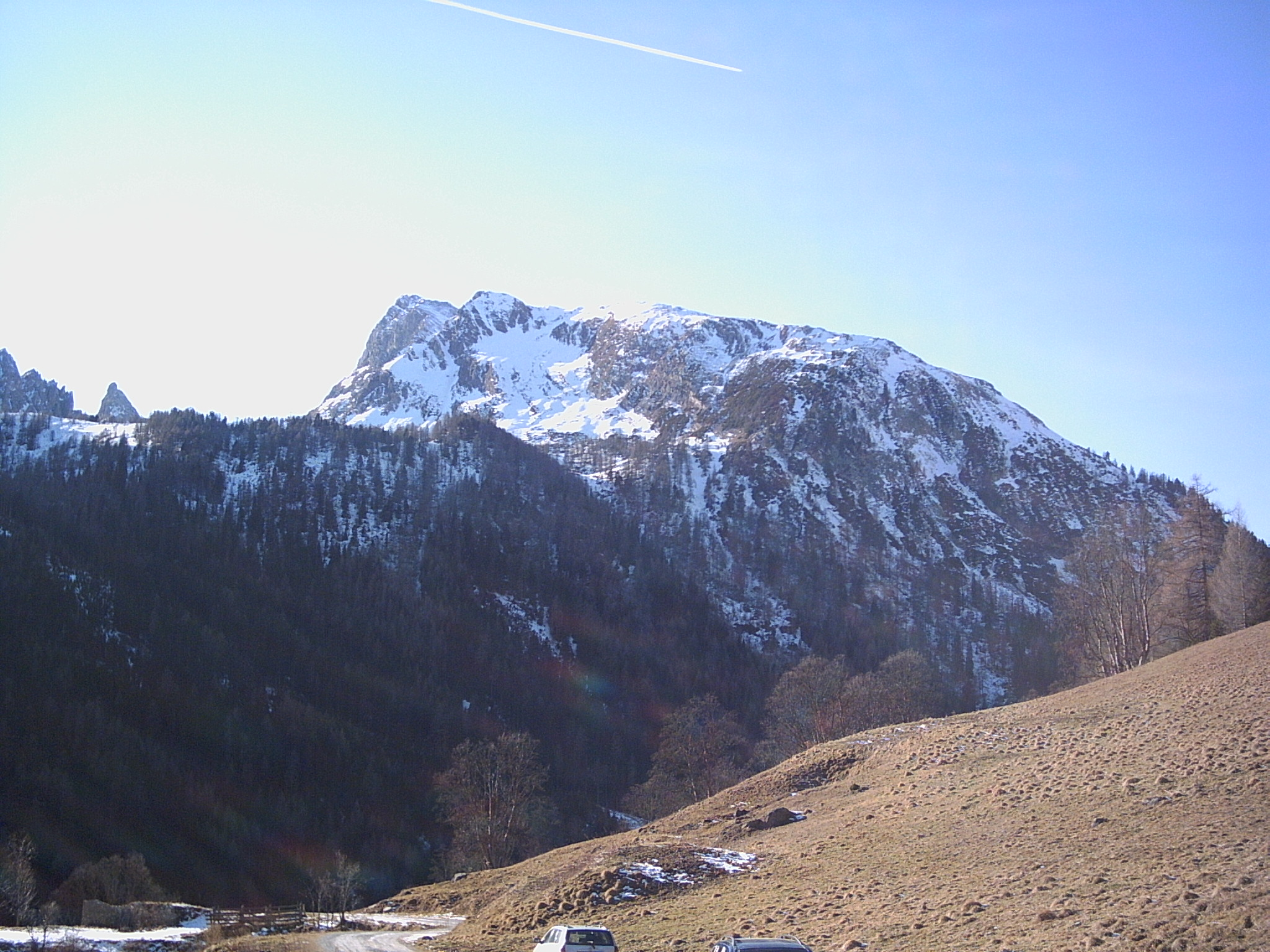
Weißeck (2,711 m) from Zederhaus

Some notable summits of the range are:

Name	elevation (m)	subsection
Hochgolling	2,862	Schladming Tauern
Weißeck	2,711	Radstadt Tauern
Mosermandl	2,680	Radstadt Tauern
Hochfeind	2,687	Radstadt Tauern
Großes Gurpitscheck	2,526	Schladming Tauern
Hundstein	2,614	Schladming Tauern
Hochwildstelle	2,747	Schladming Tauern
Roteck	2,742	Schladming Tauern
Großer Knallstein	2,599	Schladming Tauern
Rettlkirchspitze	2,475	Rottenmann and Wölz Tauern
Großer Bösenstein	2,425	Rottenmann and Wölz Tauern
Geierhaupt	2,417	Seckau Tauern
Hochreichhart	2,416	Seckau Tauern
Seckauer Zinken	2,389	Seckau Tauern
Maierangerkogel	2,356	Seckau Tauern

== Geology and environment ==
The Lower Tauern mark the approximate eastern limit of the continuous ice sheet in the Alps during the Würm glaciation. Eastern parts of the group were therefore unglaciated, and served as an important refugium for silicicolous plants.

== Winter sports ==
A number of skiing resorts are situated in the Lower Tauern, including Obertauern and Schladming.
