= Seckau Tauern =

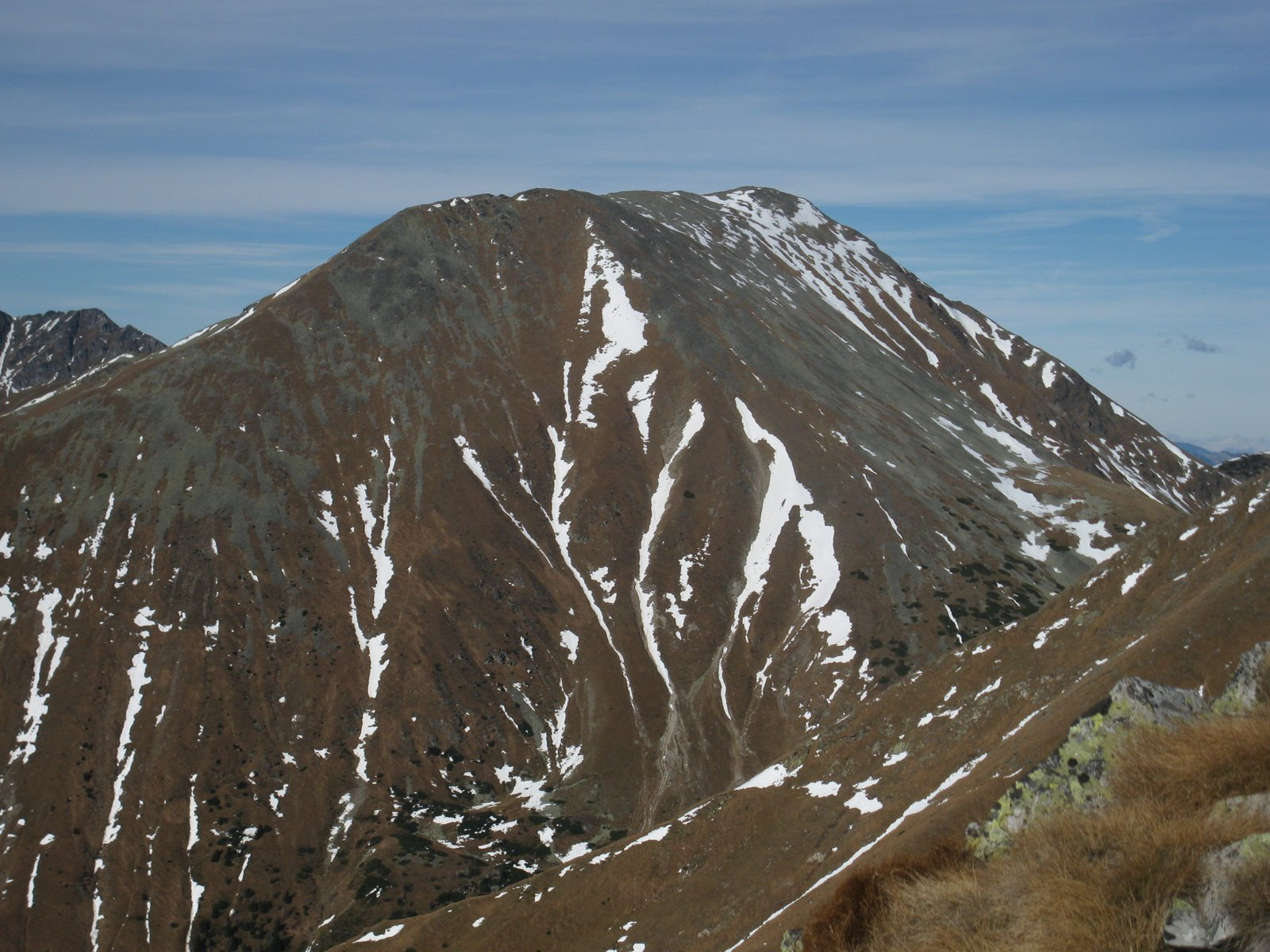
- The Hochreichhart, one of the most popular summits of the Seckau Tauern

Highest point
- Peak: Geierhaupt
- Elevation: 2,417 m above sea level (AA)

Geography
- Location within Alps
- Location: Styria, Austria
- Range coordinates: 47°25′N 14°38′E
- Parent range: Low Tauern

The Seckau Tauern or Seckau Alps (German: Seckauer Tauern or Seckauer Alpen) are a small subrange of the Low Tauern mountains in the Austrian Central Alps, part of the Eastern Alps. The range is located in the Austria state of Styria.

== Boundary and divisions ==
The Seckau Tauern are the easternmost part of the Low Tauern; they are bounded by the valleys of the Ingeringbach and Liesing streams. Their name comes from the village of Seckau, which lies 5 km north of Knittelfeld and is known for its Benedictine monastery.

The northwestern part of the range is also called the Trieben Tauern (Triebener Tauern). The pass known as the Triebener Tauern runs over this section from Trieben to Judenburg.

== Neighbouring ranges ==
The Seckau Tauern are adjacent to the following other Alpine ranges:

- Ennstal Alps (to the north and east)
- Lavanttal Alps (to the south)
- Rottenmann and Wölz Tauern (to the west)

== Summit ==
The highest mountains in the Seckau Alps are the Geierhaupt (2,417 m), the Hochreichhart (2,416 m), the prominent Seckauer Zinken (2,398 m) and the Maierangerkogel (2,356 m).

== Tourism ==
=== Alpine huts ===
In the Seckau Tauern are the following huts belonging to the Austrian Alpine Club (OeAV) and the Austrian Tourist Club (ÖTK):

- Sonnleitner Hut: height 1,215 metres, not managed, for self-sufficient guests, 27 mattresses. Base is Gaal, walking time from Gaal 1,5 hours. Road to the hut.
- Triebental Hut: height 1,104 metres, not managed, for self-sufficient guests, 18 mattresses, winter room with AV key. Base is Trieben.
- Hochreichhart Schutzhaus: height 1,483 metres.

=== Importance ===
The Seckau Tauern are primarily of regional significance for mountain sports throughout the year. Only a few summits, like the Hochreichart and Seckauer Zinken, attract visitors from outside the region as destinations for hiking and ski touring.
