= Michaelerberg-Pruggern =

- Municipality
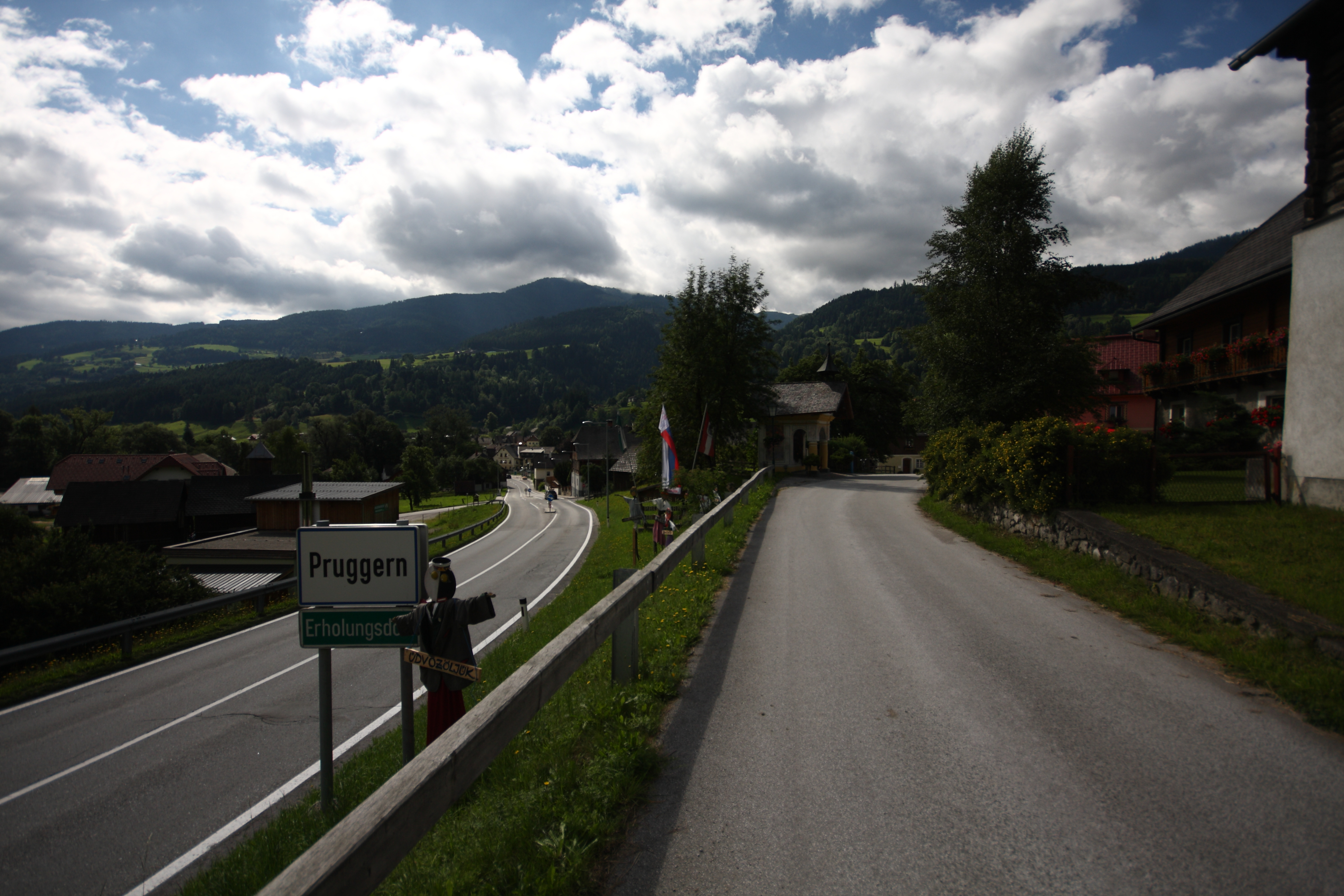
- View of Pruggern

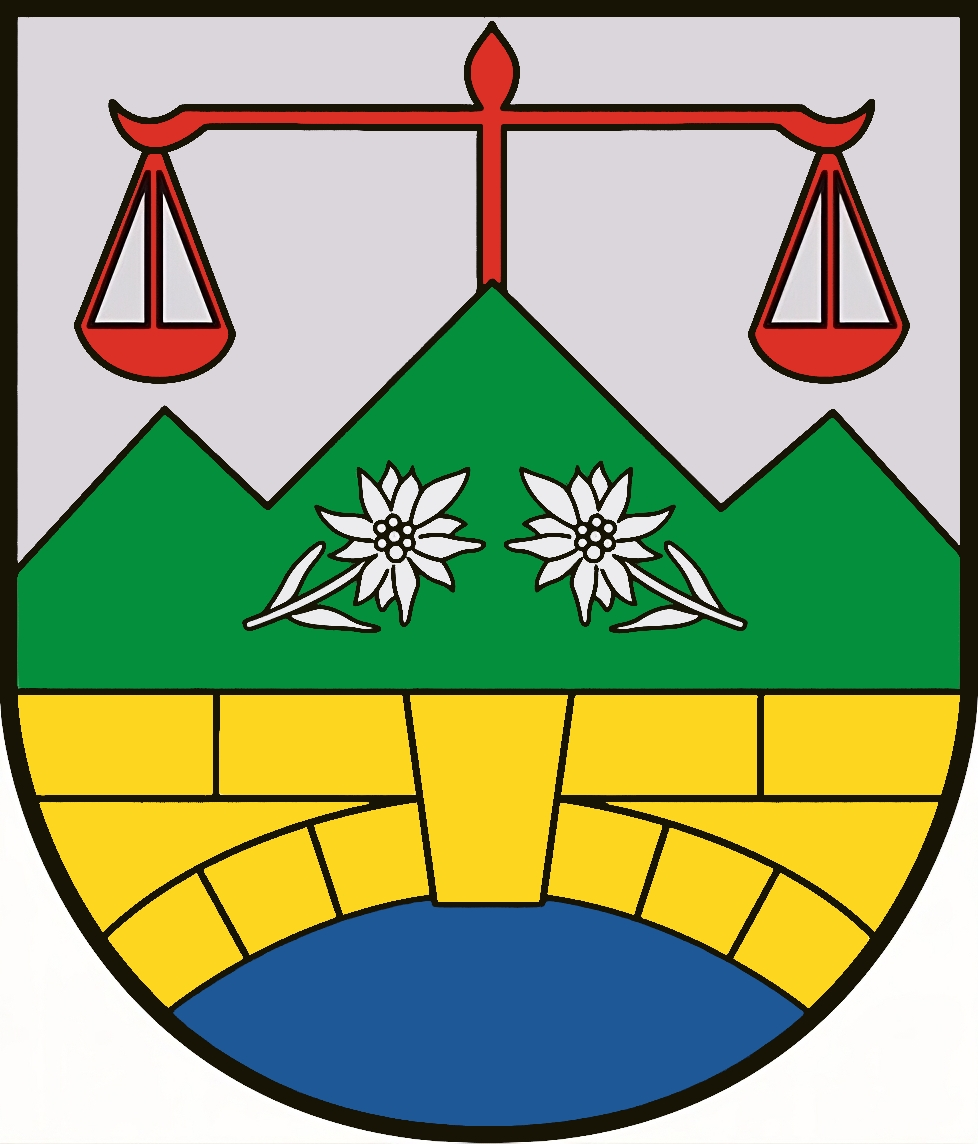
- Coat of arms

- Location within Austria
- Coordinates: 47°25′24″N 13°52′31″E
- Country: Austria
- State: Styria
- District: Liezen
- Established: 2015-01-01

Government
  - Mayor: Johann Huber (ÖVP)

Area
  - Total: 47.83 km^{2} (18.47 sq mi)
- Elevation: 681 m (2,234 ft)

Population (2018-01-01)
  - Total: 1,188
  - Density: 24.84/km^{2} (64.33/sq mi)
- Time zone: UTC+1 (CET)
  - Summer (DST): UTC+2 (CEST)
- Postal code: 8962, 8965
- Area code: +43 3685
- Vehicle registration: GB
- Website: www.michaelerberg-pruggern.at

Michaelerberg-Pruggern is a municipality in the district of Liezen in Styria, Austria. It was created on 1 January 2015 as part of the Styria municipal structural reform, when the former municipalities of Michaelerberg and Pruggern were merged.
