= Sölk Pass =

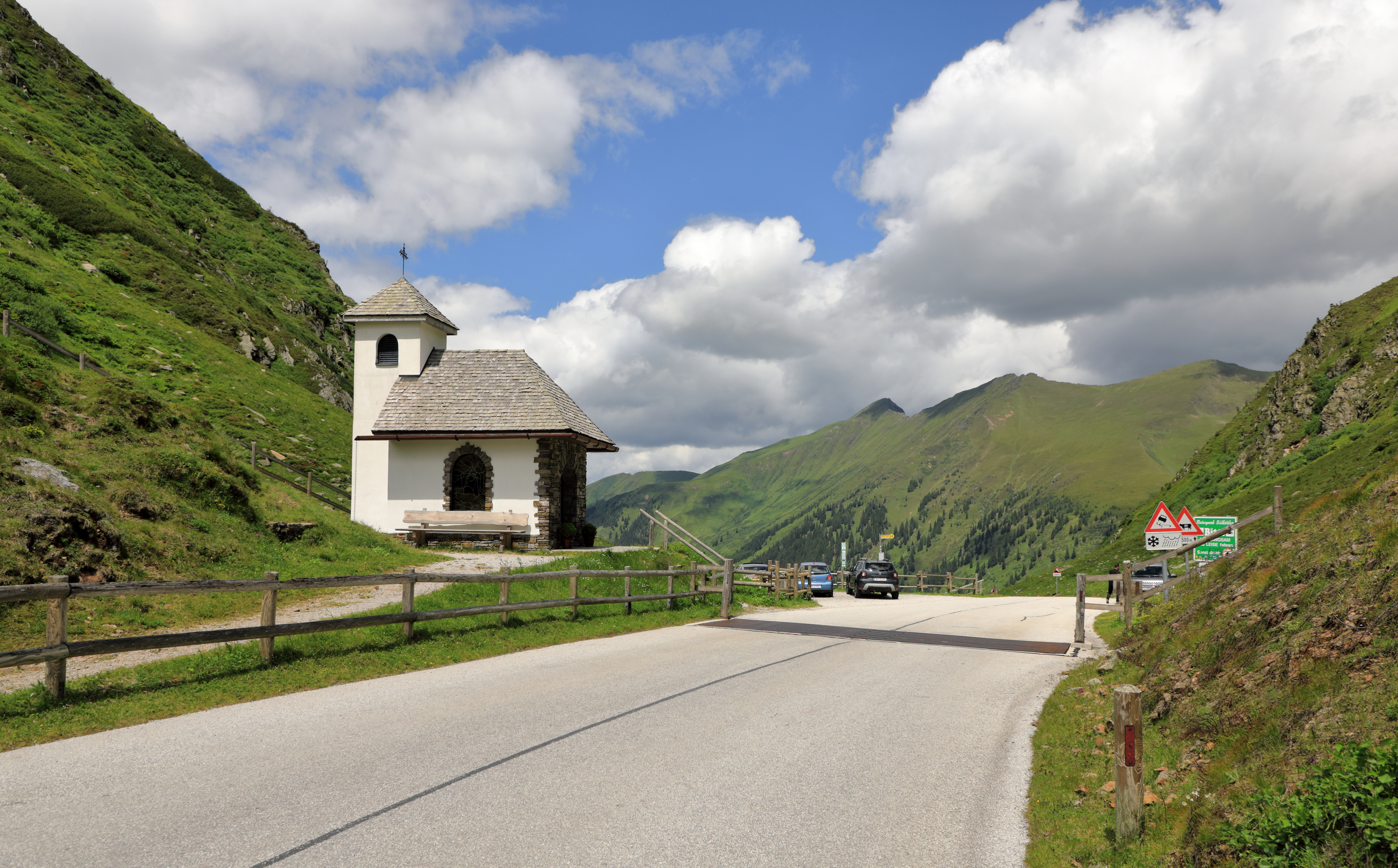
- Summit of the pass

- Location within Alps
- Elevation: 1,788 metres (5,866 ft)

Third Approach
- Location: Austria
- Range: Alps
- Coordinates: 47°16′17″N 14°4′46″E

Sölk Pass (el. 1788 m.) is a high mountain pass in the Austrian Alps in the Bundesland of Styria.

It crosses the Niedere Tauern and connects the Mur River valley with the Enns River valley.

The pass road is a secondary highway and is not cleared in winter. Nearby passes include Radstädter Tauern Pass and the Tauern Tunnel to the west and Triebener Tauern Pass to the east.

== See also ==
- List of highest paved roads in Europe
- List of mountain passes
