= Triebener Tauern Pass =

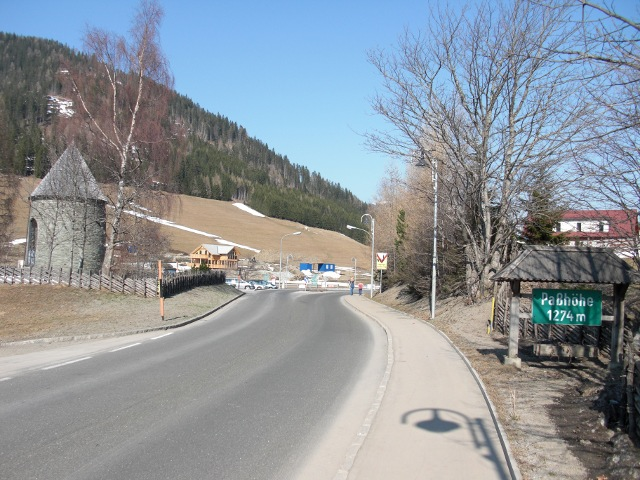
- Summit at Hohentauern

- Location within Alps
- Elevation: 1,274 metres (4,180 ft)
- Traversed by: Bundesstraße B 114

Third Approach
- Location: Austria
- Range: Central Eastern Alps
- Coordinates: 47°26′3″N 14°29′1″E

Triebener Tauern Pass (el. 1274 m.) is a mountain pass in the Central Eastern Alps in Austria, in the Bundesland of Styria. It crosses the Niedere Tauern chain, connecting the city of Judenburg in the Mur valley in the south with Trieben in the north.

Until the 1970s the northern ascent had two steeply sloping sections with a maximum grade of 16 and 21% including multiple hairpin turns, moreover affected by landslides. After several accidents, the pass road underwent major reconstructions, recently from June 2006 to October 2008, which reduced the maximum grade to 10 and 13%.

== See also ==
- List of highest paved roads in Europe
- List of mountain passes
