= Göriach =

- Municipality
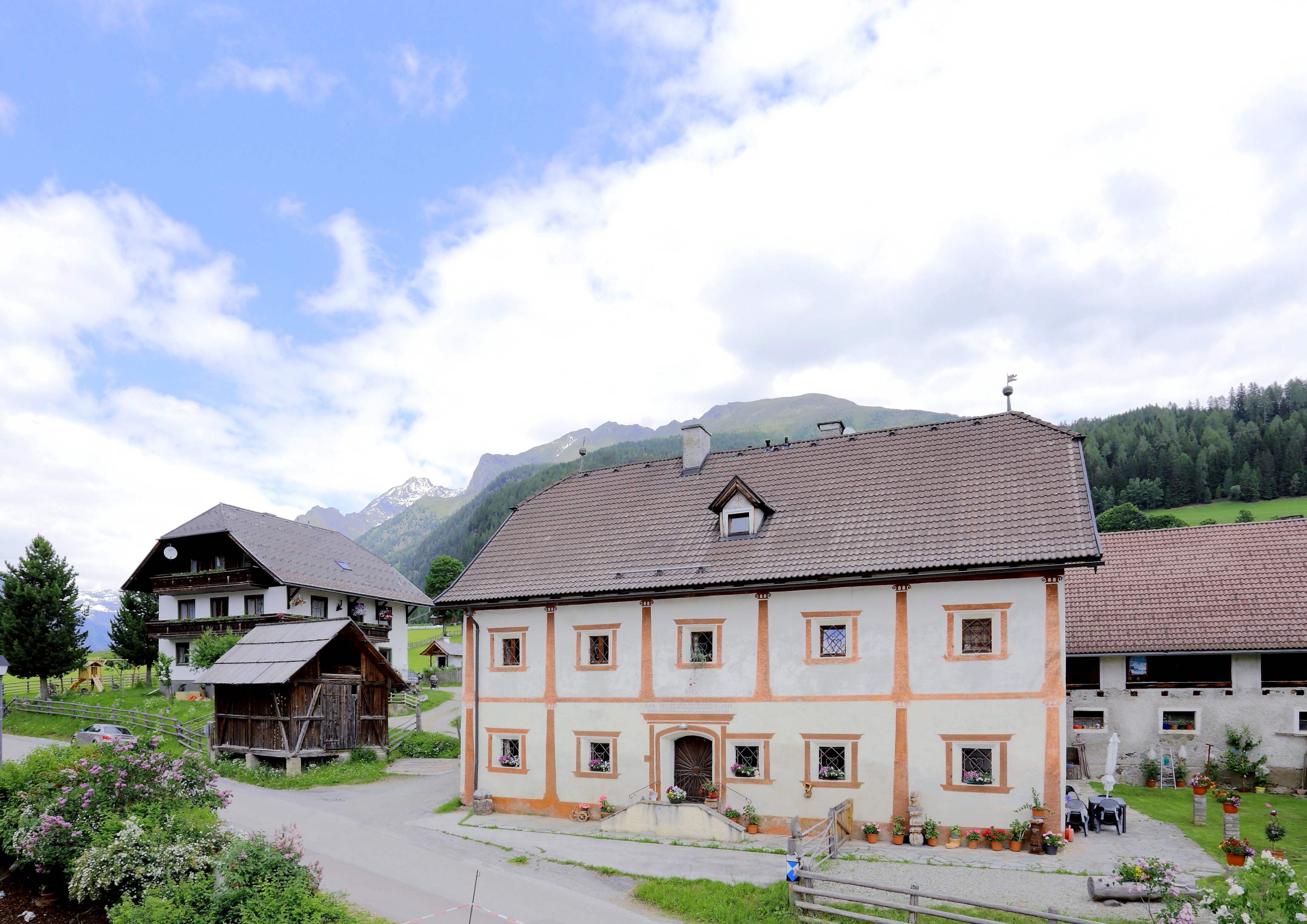
- Piendlhof in Göriach

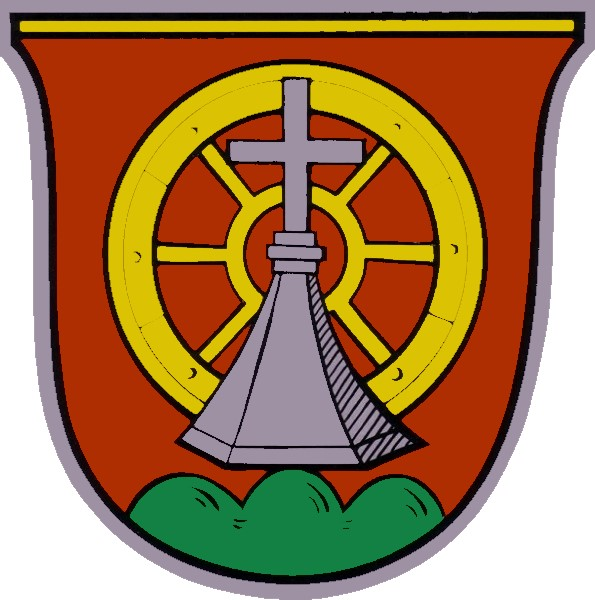
- Coat of arms

- Location within Austria
- Coordinates: 47°10′29″N 13°45′53″E
- Country: Austria
- State: Salzburg
- District: Tamsweg

Government
  - Mayor: Waltraud Grall (ÖVP)

Area
  - Total: 44.15 km^{2} (17.05 sq mi)
- Elevation: 1,180 m (3,870 ft)

Population (2018-01-01)
  - Total: 337
  - Density: 7.63/km^{2} (19.8/sq mi)
- Time zone: UTC+1 (CET)
  - Summer (DST): UTC+2 (CEST)
- Postal code: 5571
- Area code: 06483
- Vehicle registration: TA
- Website: www.gemeinde-goeriach.at

Göriach is a municipality in the district of Tamsweg in the state of Salzburg in Austria.

== Geography ==
Göriach lies about 6 km northwest of Tamsweg and about 80 km southeast of Salzburg. It lies in the Göriach valley on the south side of the Schladminger Tauern.
