= Hochgolling =

Mountain of the Eastern Alps

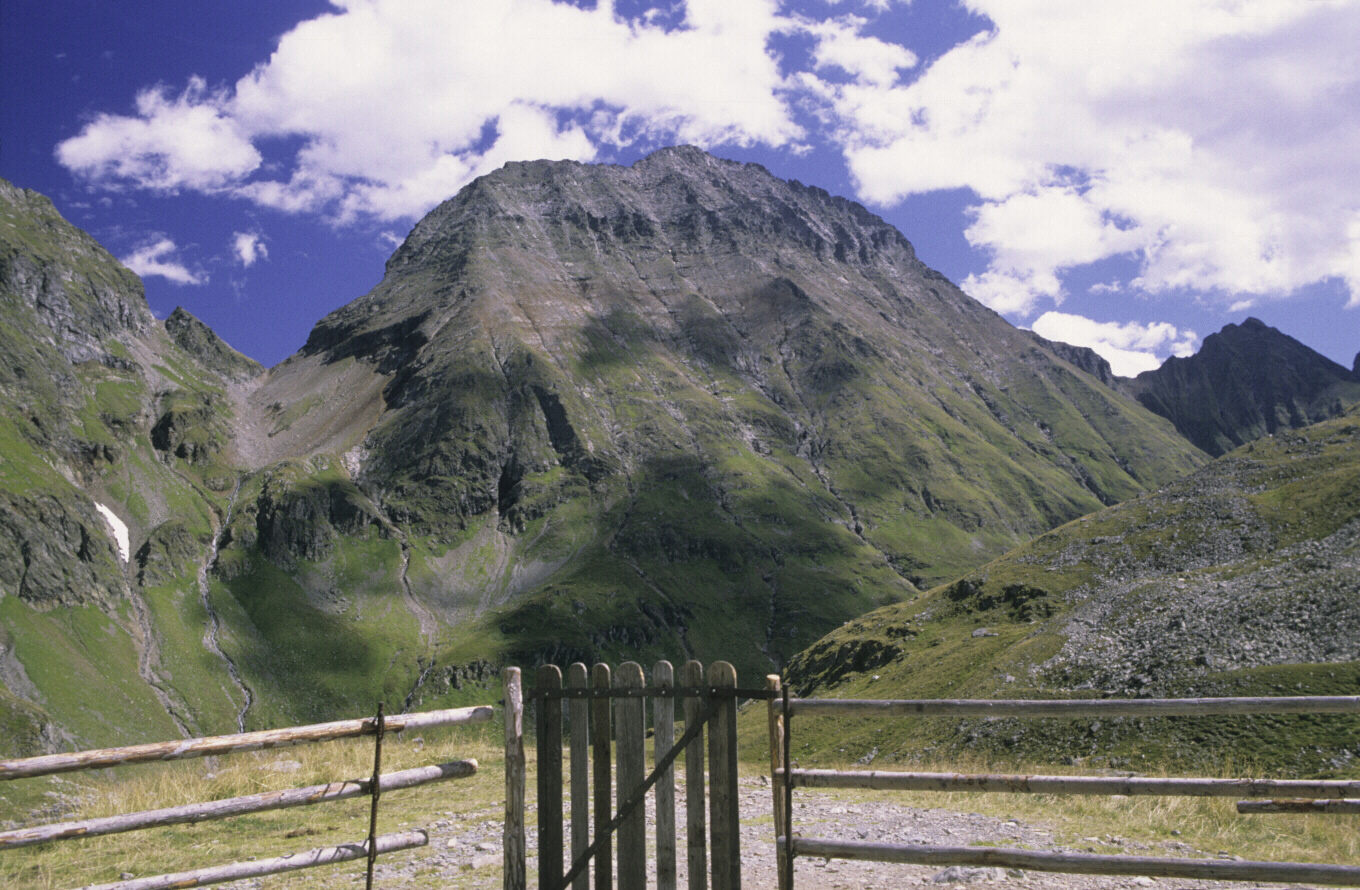
- Hochgolling from the west in 1994

Highest point
- Elevation: 2,862 m (9,390 ft)
- Prominence: 1,124 m (3,688 ft)
- Coordinates: 47°16′00″N 13°45′42″E

Geography
- Location within Alps
- Location: Steiermark and Salzburg, Austria
- Parent range: Lower Tauern

Climbing
- First ascent: August the 8th 1791, by an unknown alpinist of Tamsweg

The Hochgolling (2,862 m) is a mountain of the Eastern Alps, located on the border of Steiermark and Salzburg, Austria, near the ski resort of Schladming. It is the highest peak of the Lower Tauern range.

A hiking rather than a climbing peak, the mountain is relatively low by alpine standards, but still towers over all of its neighbours. Its northern face is a 1,200 m high wall, while its other slopes are more gentle. A long ridge slopes south from the summit, dividing the Göriach Valley from the Lessach Valley.

Due to Hochgolling's topographic isolation the views from its summit are panoramic, stretching from the glaciated peaks of the vast High Tauern in the west to the lower Gurktal Alps to the east, and including the Julian Alps, Kamnik Alps and Karawanks to the south.

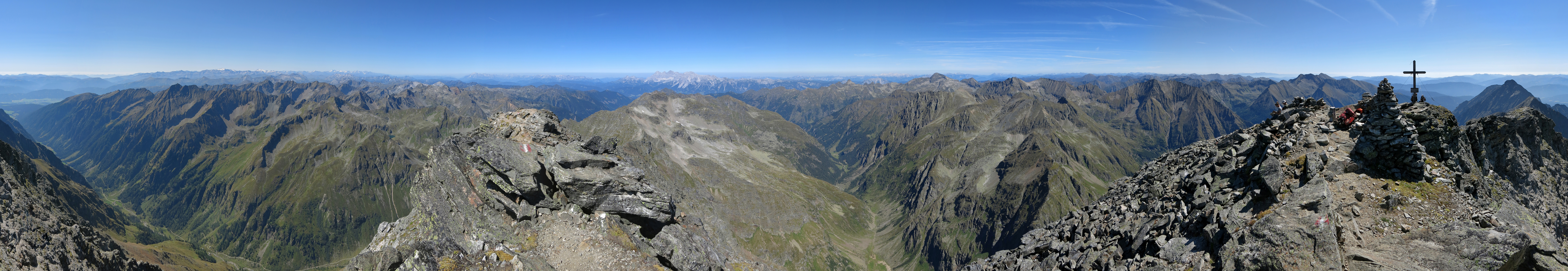
Panoramic view from the summit
