= St. Martin bei Lofer =

Municipality in Salzburg, Austria

- Municipality
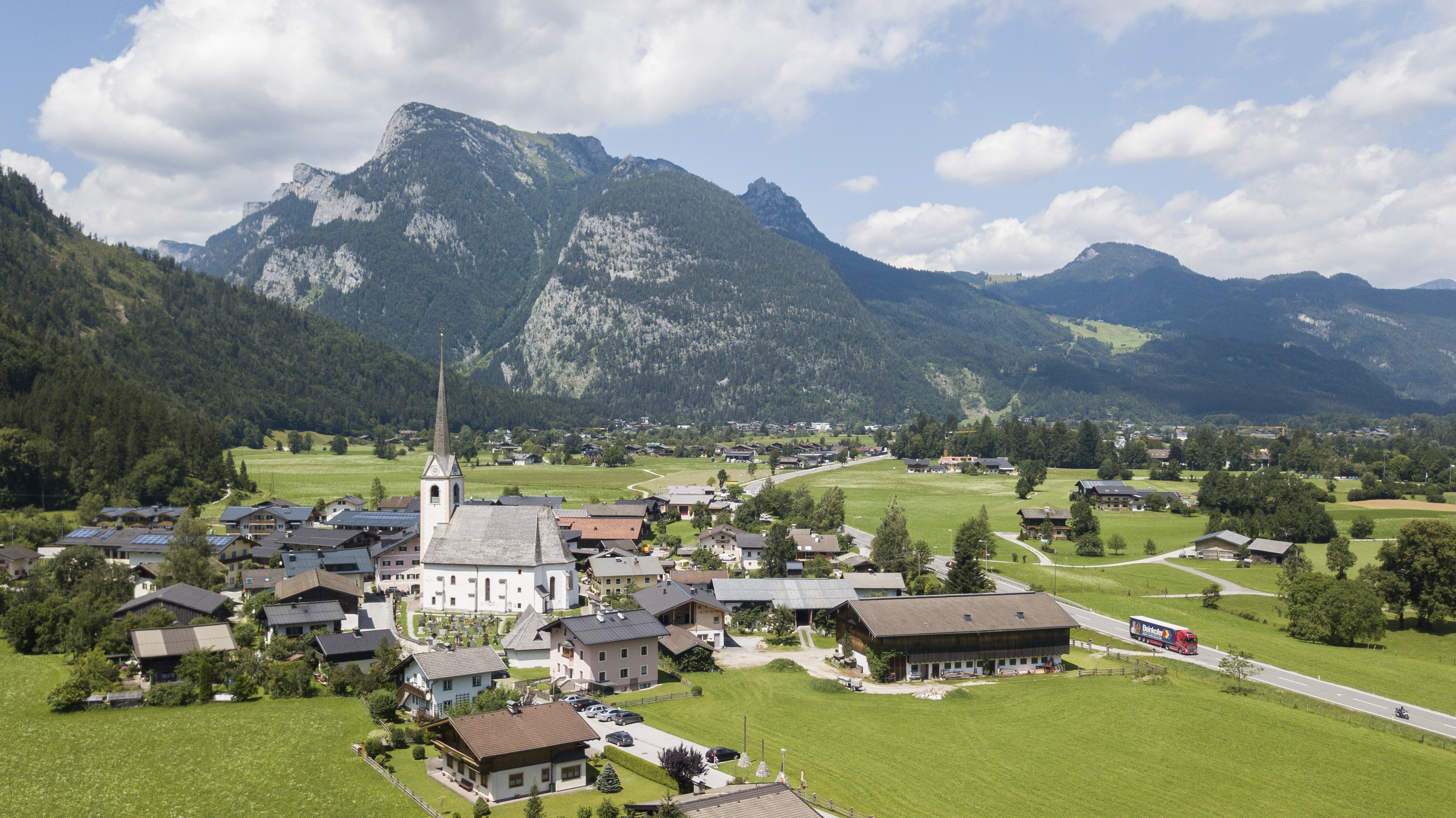

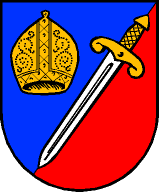
- Coat of arms

- Location within Austria
- Coordinates: 47°34′00″N 12°42′00″E
- Country: Austria
- State: Salzburg
- District: Zell am See

Government
  - Mayor: Josef Leitinger (ÖVP)

Area
  - Total: 63.55 km^{2} (24.54 sq mi)
- Elevation: 633 m (2,077 ft)

Population (2018-01-01)
  - Total: 1,153
  - Density: 18.14/km^{2} (46.99/sq mi)
- Time zone: UTC+1 (CET)
  - Summer (DST): UTC+2 (CEST)
- Postal code: 5092
- Area code: 06588
- Vehicle registration: ZE
- Website: www.stmartin.at

St. Martin bei Lofer is a municipality in the district of Zell am See, Pinzgau region, in the state of Salzburg, Austria.

== Geography ==
The municipality lies in the Loferer Land in the Pinzgauer Saalach valley.

Lamprechtsofen, the deepest cave in the nation, is located near the village Obsthurn.
