= Lamprechtsofen =

Deepest cave of Austria (1735 m)

- Lamprechtshöhle
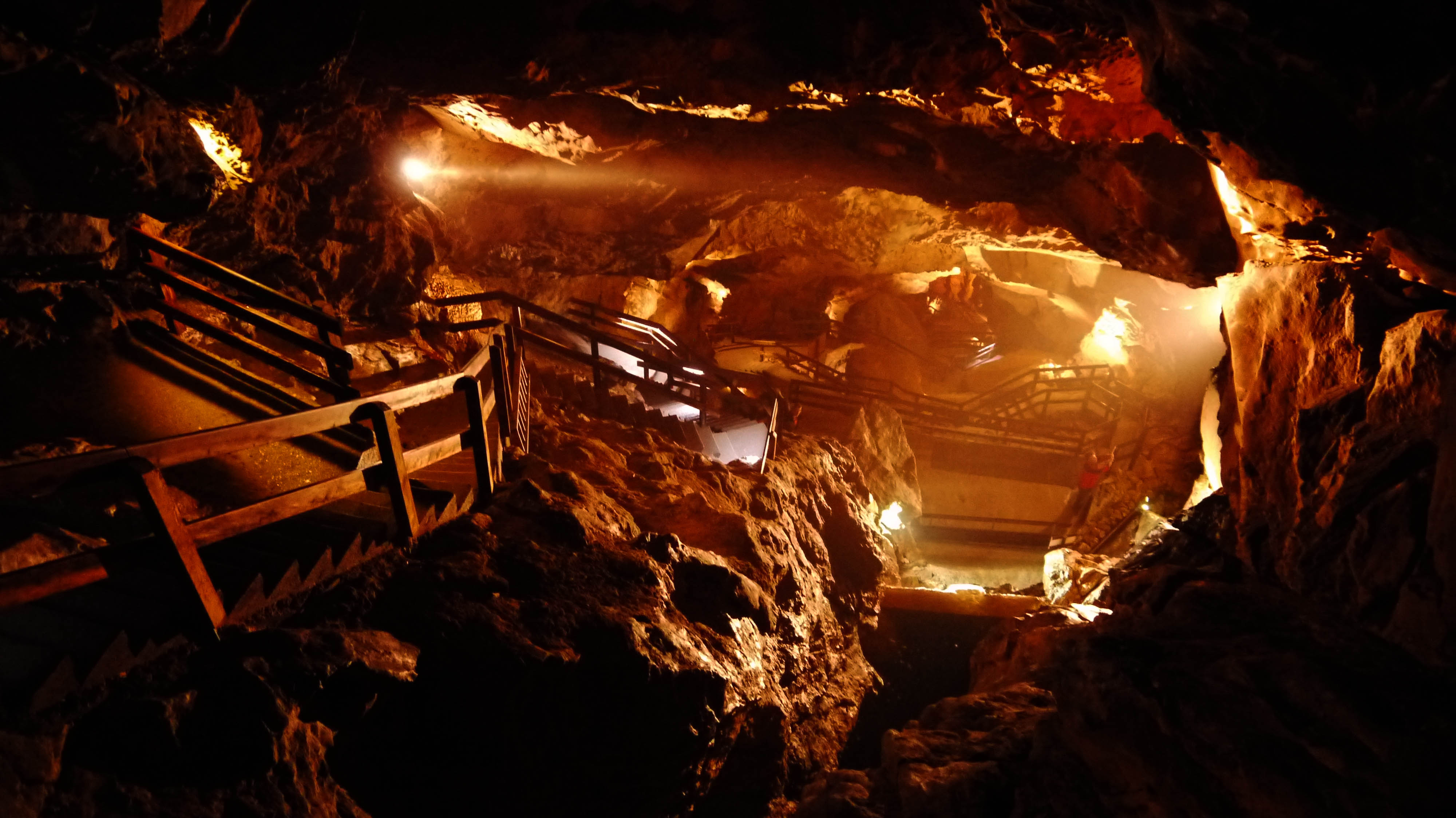
- Steps descending into the public portion of Lamprechtsofen

- Location within Austria
- Interactive map of Lamprechtsofen
- Location: Weißbach bei Lofer, Austria
- Coordinates: 47°31′34″N 12°44′21″E
- Depth: 1,727 m (5,666 ft)
- Length: 51 km (32 mi)
- Elevation: 664 m (2,178 ft)
- Geology: Dachstein limestone
- Website: lamprechtshoehle.at

Lamprechtsofen (also called Lamprechtshöhle, Lamprechtsofenhöhle or, together with a connected cave, Lamprechtsofen-Vogelschacht) is a limestone karst river cave in Austria. With a depth of 1,735 m (5,692 ft), it is one of the deepest caves in the world. Before the discovery of the Krubera Cave in Georgia, it was the deepest-known cave in the world. Lamprechtsofen is located 2 km (1.2 mi) northwest of Weißbach bei Lofer (Salzburg), Austria, in the Leogang Mountains.

== History ==
=== Early history ===
The cave has been known for centuries. In 1701 it was walled up to prevent the intrusion of treasure seekers, who were lured to the cave by legends of wealth hidden by a knight named Lamprecht after the Crusades.

In 1905, several human skeletons were found in the cave, probably the remains of treasure hunters. At the same time, a 600-metre (2,000 ft) portion of the cave was opened to the public as a show cave.

=== Exploration and depth record ===
The exploration of Lamprechtsofen has been primarily conducted from the bottom (from the resurgence of its cave river), rather than the top-down exploration typical for vertical caves.

On August 19, 1998, a team led by Polish caver Andrzej Ciszewski discovered a connection between Lamprechtsofen and the PL-2 cave system, which established the height difference of the united cave system as 1,632 m (5,354 ft). This new discovery made Lamprechtsofen the deepest-known cave in the world for less than three years, as Krubera was discovered in June 2001 to be 2,197 metres (7,208 ft) deep.

As of 2014, Lamprechtsofen is the fourth-deepest cave in the world, as two more Georgian caves have since been discovered to be deeper. Sarma Cave is 1,830 m (6,000 ft) and Illyuzia-Mezhonnogo-Snezhnaya Cave is 1,753 m (5,751 ft). On August 14, 2018 a Polish expedition connects the CL3 chasm to the Lamprechtsofen allowing the cavity to reach the depth of 1735 m.

== Show cave ==
Today, about 700 m (2,300 ft) are open to visitors, a portion of the cave that covers a 70-metre (230 ft) altitude difference.

Because of the cave's river, it is subject to flooding from heavy rain and melting snow. As such, visitors and explorers have been occasionally trapped in the cave.

== See also ==
- List of caves
- Speleology
- List of deepest caves
