= Castle Saalhof =

Castle in Salzburg, Austria

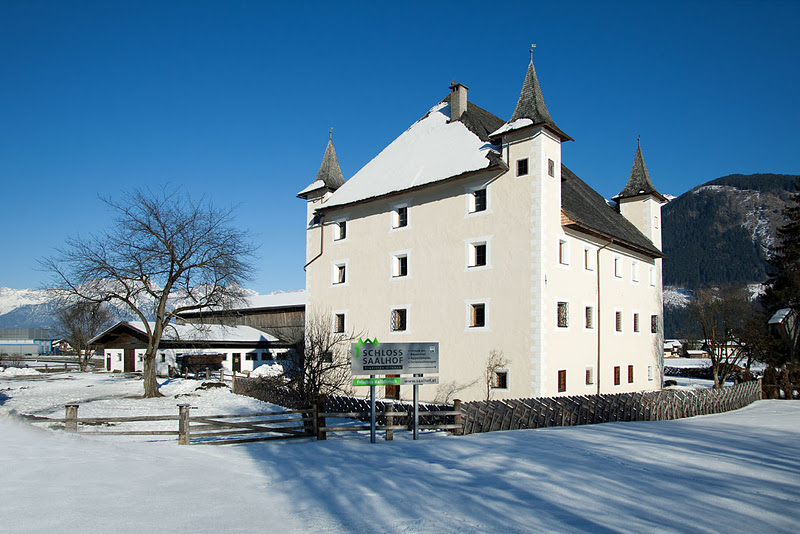
- Castle Saalhof in winter

Site information
- Code: AT-5

Location
- Coordinates: 47°21′36.227″N 12°48′3.708″E

Castle Saalhof is one of the oldest castles in the Pinzgau region. It dates back to the 11th century, when it apparently was the home of the Counts of the region. During the renovation of the facade in 2010, the oldest parts of the castle on the north-east side were revealed. In 1600, Castle Saalhof was extended.

== History ==
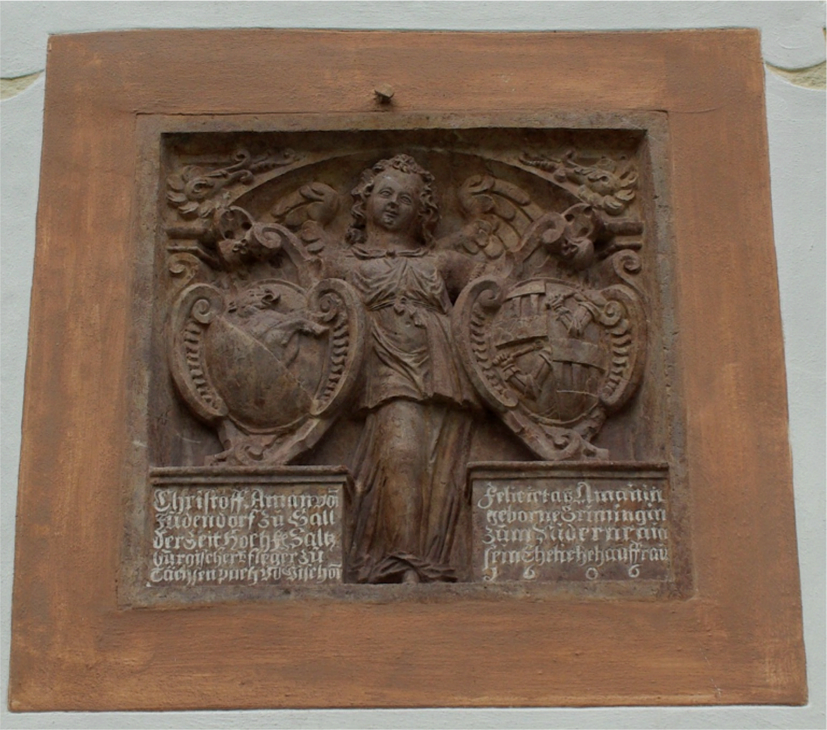
A marble relief from 1606 above the main entrance documents the rebuild.

- In 1296, the castle is apparently owned by “Konrad, the devil”.
- In 1423, the first verifiable owner of the archiepiscopal period is Oswald Eisenstang (= called Oswald the iron rod).
- In 1584, ownership passes to the Amann family from Judendorf and Saal.
- In 1600, Christoff Amann from Judendorf and Saal rebuild the castle in a style, typical for the region. The marble relief and emblem above the main entrance, laid in 1606, as well as a large part of the interior arrangement derive from this time.
- In 1634, the castle comes to the Riedl family following the marriage of Amanns’ daughter Maria: An emblem on the first floor, laid in 1661, testifies to the marriage of Mathias Riedl from Saal and Maria Riedlin born Stöcklin from Judendorf.
- In 1714, the castle is transferred to the Kobald family from Dambach and Moll. During this time, the castle has its own chapel inside.
- In 1840, the castle comes into rural possession, it is bought by the landlord Josef Zehentner from the small village of Weißbach near Lofer. He is a direct ancestor of the Rieder family which owns the castle now.
- In 1971, the two old stable blocks (with roof ridges from 1828 and 1586) were demolished and new ones constructed.
- In 1975, the road to Maishofen which crossed the yard of Castle Saalhof in former times is moved to the new crossing.
- Since 1992 the castle, the Meier‘s house and the Christian wayside shrine in the garden stand under federal conservation of monuments and historic buildings.
- In 2004, Hermann and his wife Kathrin Rieder take over the property.

== Current use ==
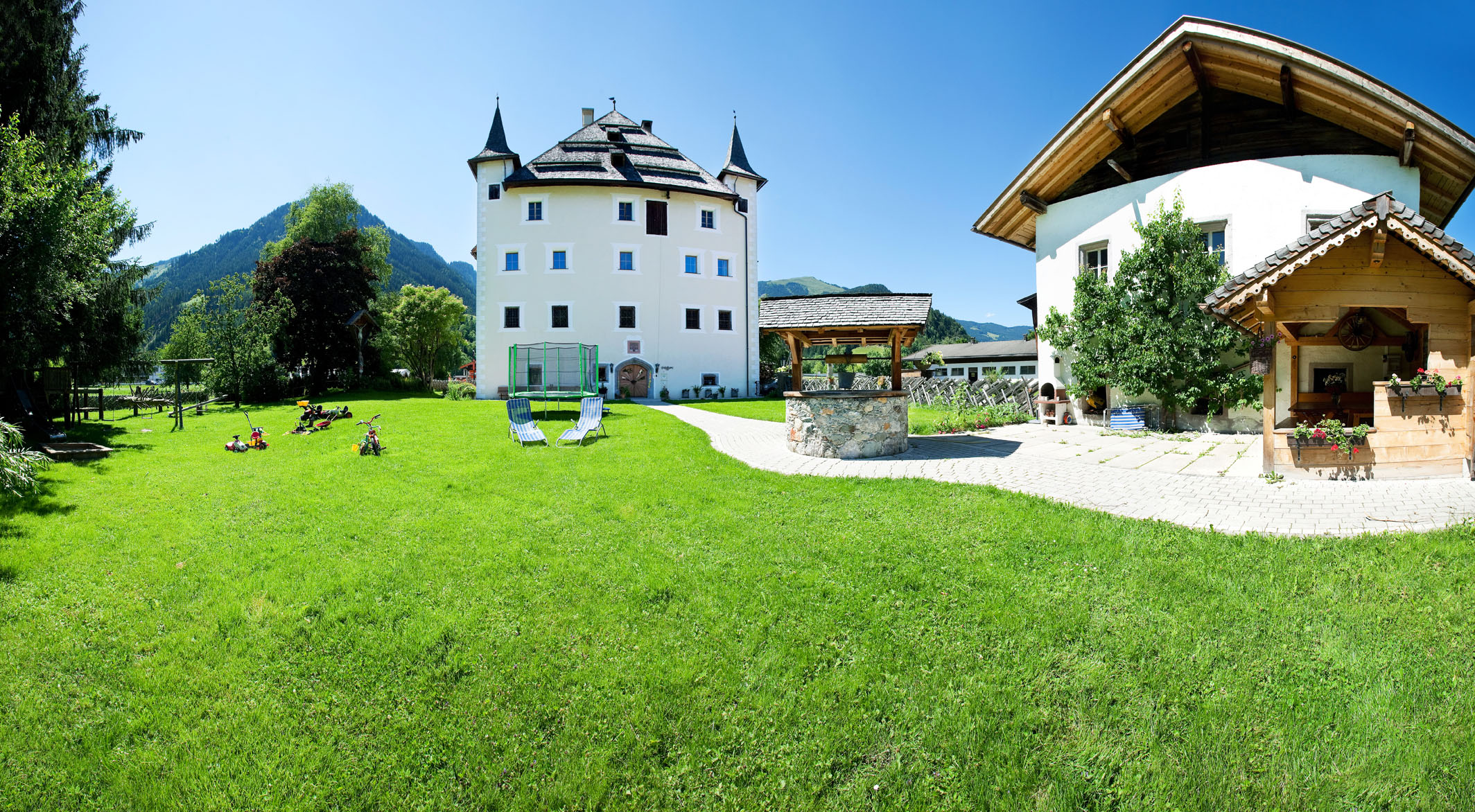
Castle Saalhof in summer

Since 2006 newly renovated apartments within the castle are available. In 2010, the facade was renovated and the old colours from the 17th century have been restored. The Meier’s house on the eastern side was earlier the dwelling of the curator (Meier), farm labourers and servants. The date in the roof ridge - the year of construction - is 1686. In 1814 the Meier’s house was used as a school for Maishofen. The castle and Meier’s house are private buildings.

== Gallery ==
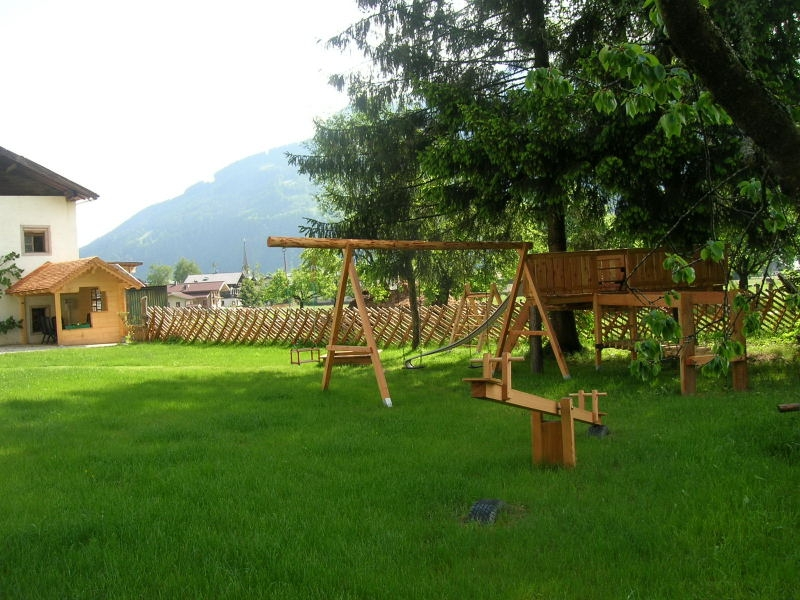
garden

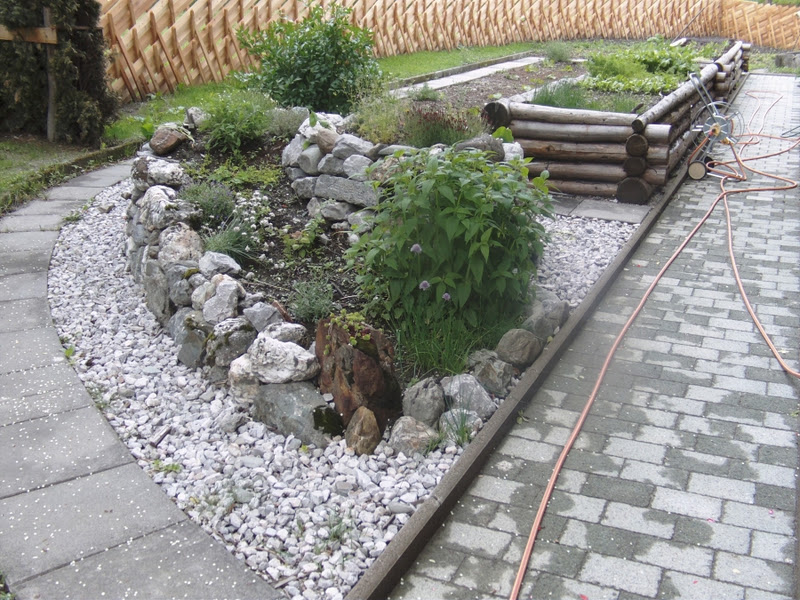
herbgarden

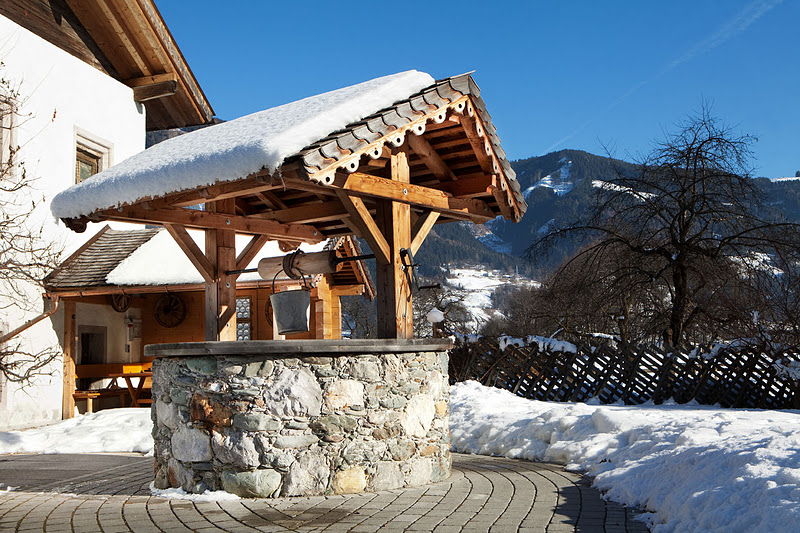
fountain

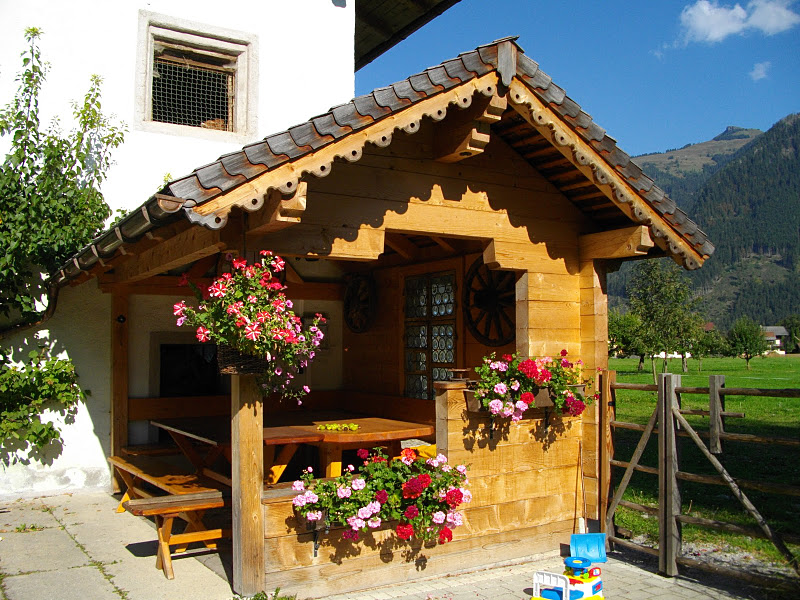
barbeque hut

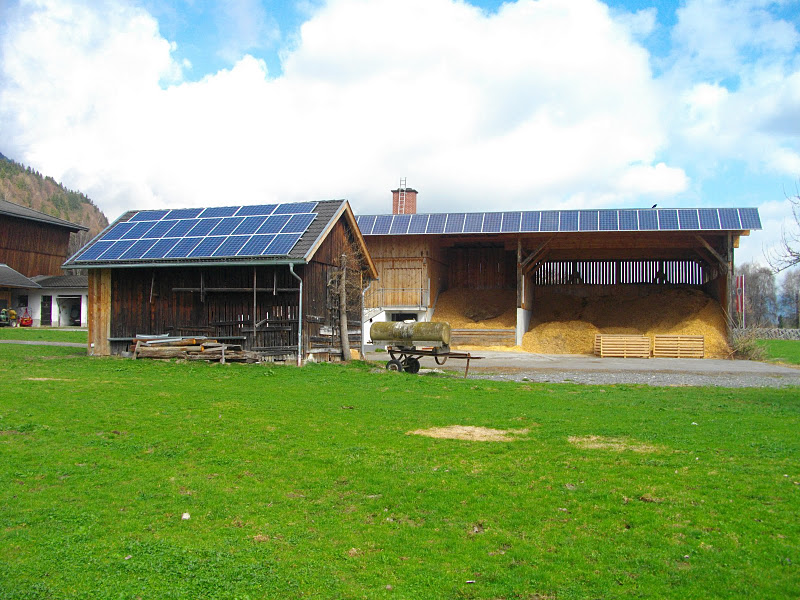
bioheat
