= Bruck an der Großglocknerstraße =

Bruck an der Großglocknerstraße Bruck a da Glocknerstrouss
- Municipality
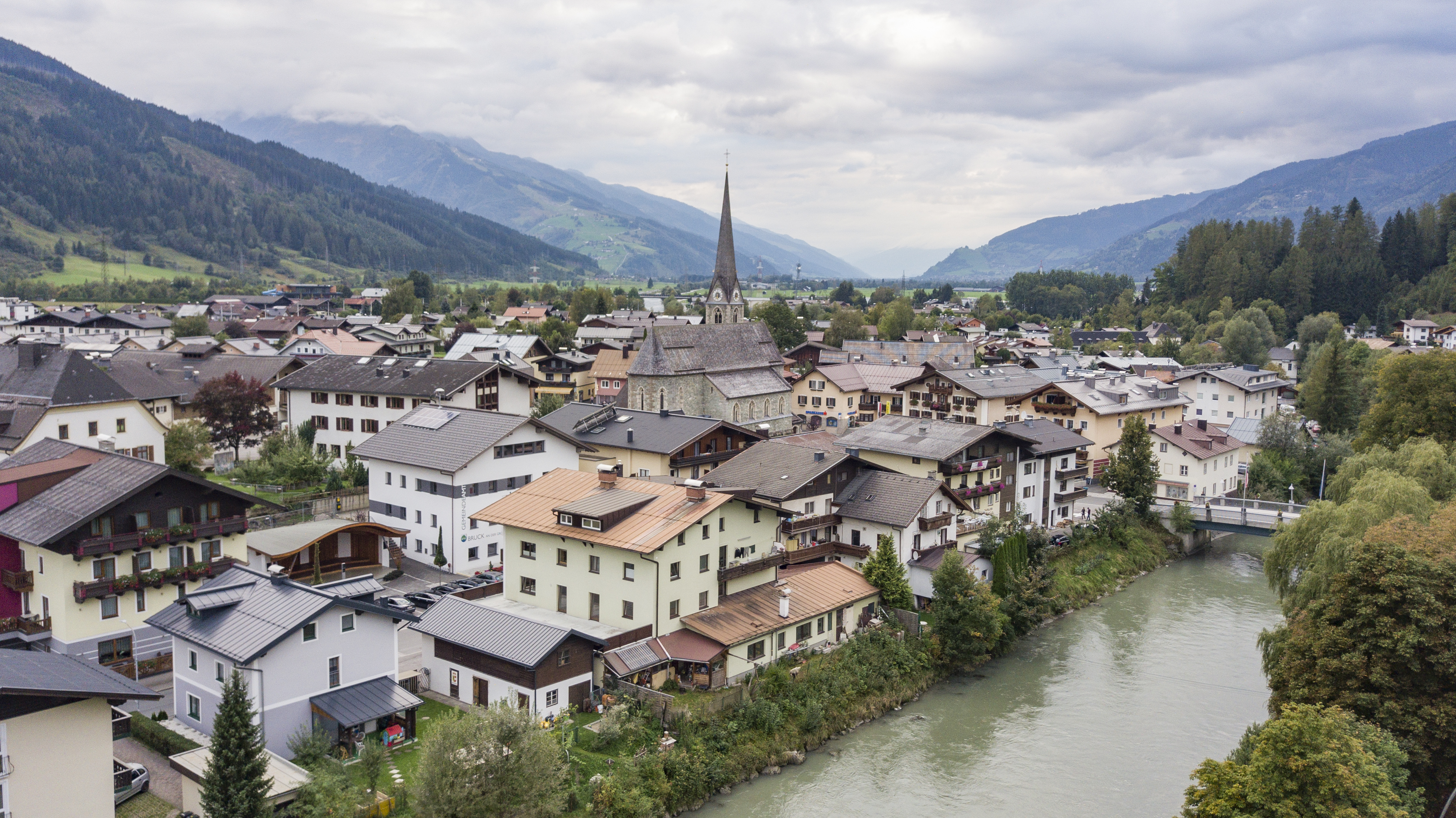

- Coat of arms

- Location within Austria
- Coordinates: 47°17′00″N 12°49′30″E
- Country: Austria
- State: Salzburg
- District: Zell am See

Government
  - Mayor: Barbara Huber (OEVP)

Area
  - Total: 45.77 km^{2} (17.67 sq mi)
- Elevation: 756 m (2,480 ft)

Population (2018-01-01)
  - Total: 4,699
  - Density: 102.7/km^{2} (265.9/sq mi)
- Time zone: UTC+1 (CET)
  - Summer (DST): UTC+2 (CEST)
- Postal code: 5671
- Area code: 06545
- Vehicle registration: ZE
- Website: www.bruck-grossglockner.at

Bruck an der Großglocknerstraße (Southern Bavarian: Bruck a da Glocknerstrouss) is a municipality in Zell am See District, in the state of Salzburg in Austria.

== Geography ==
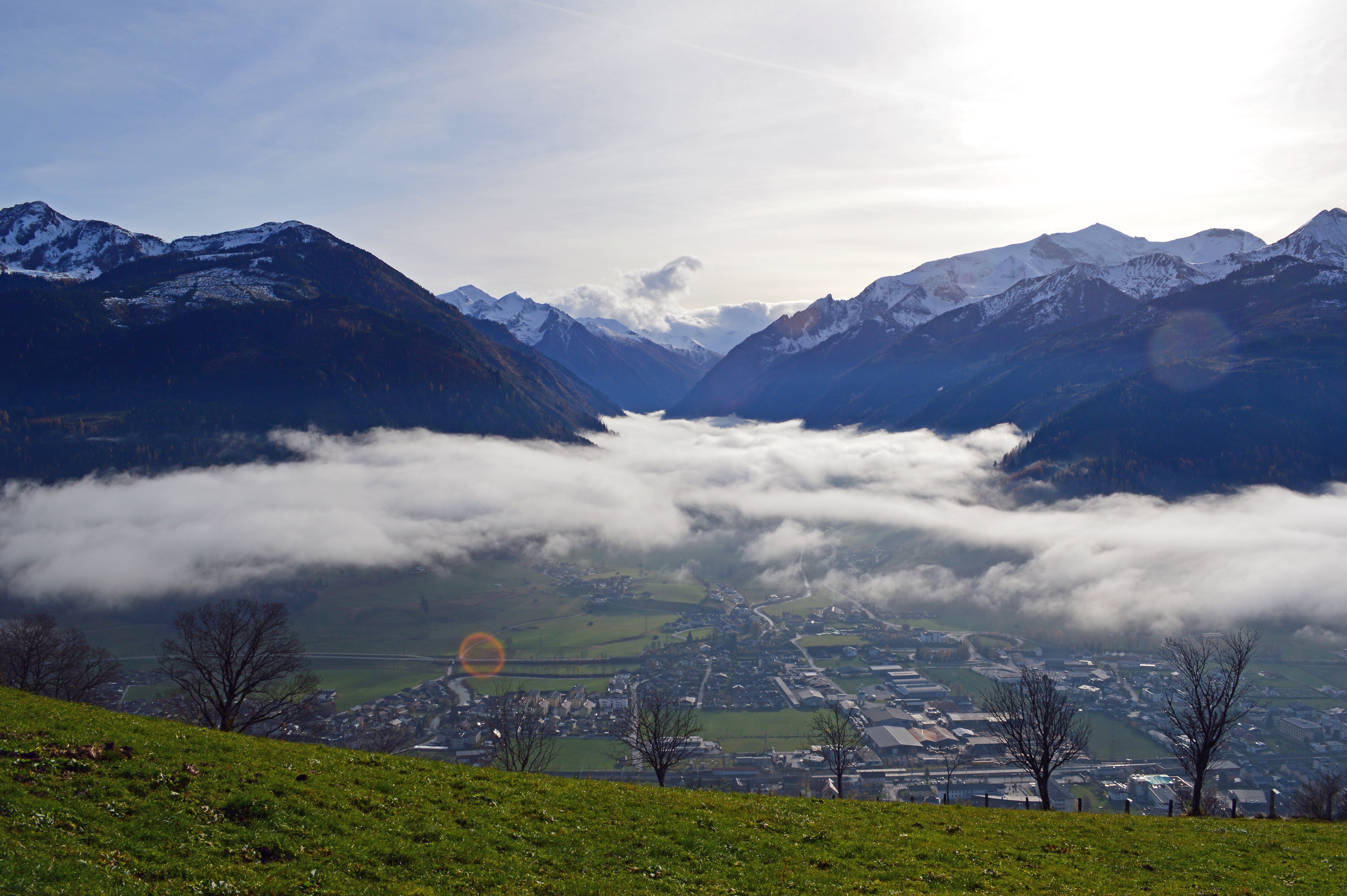
Fog above the Fusch valley

Bruck in the historic Pinzgau region is situated in the valley of the Salzach river, at the northern entrance to the Grossglockner High Alpine Road running up to the High Tauern mountain range and the Alpine crest. Neighbouring municipalities are Zell am See, Taxenbach, Fusch, Kaprun, and Maria Alm.

The municipal area comprises the cadastral communities of Bruck, Hundsdorf, Reith, and Sankt Georgen. Local villages are: Brandenau, Bruck, Fischhorn, Gries, Hauserdorf, Hundsdorf, Krössenbach, Niederhof, Pichl, Reit, Sankt Georgen, Steinbach, Vorfusch, and Winkl.

== History ==
Evidence points to a settlement as early as the Bronze Age and Hallstatt period. The Illyrians and Celts settled here, as did the Romans from about 15 BC. In the course of the Migration Period and the fall of the Roman Empire, Bavarians settled and mingled with the local population. The first mention of Prugg im Pinzgrey in the Archbishopric of Salzburg occurred in a 1227 deed.

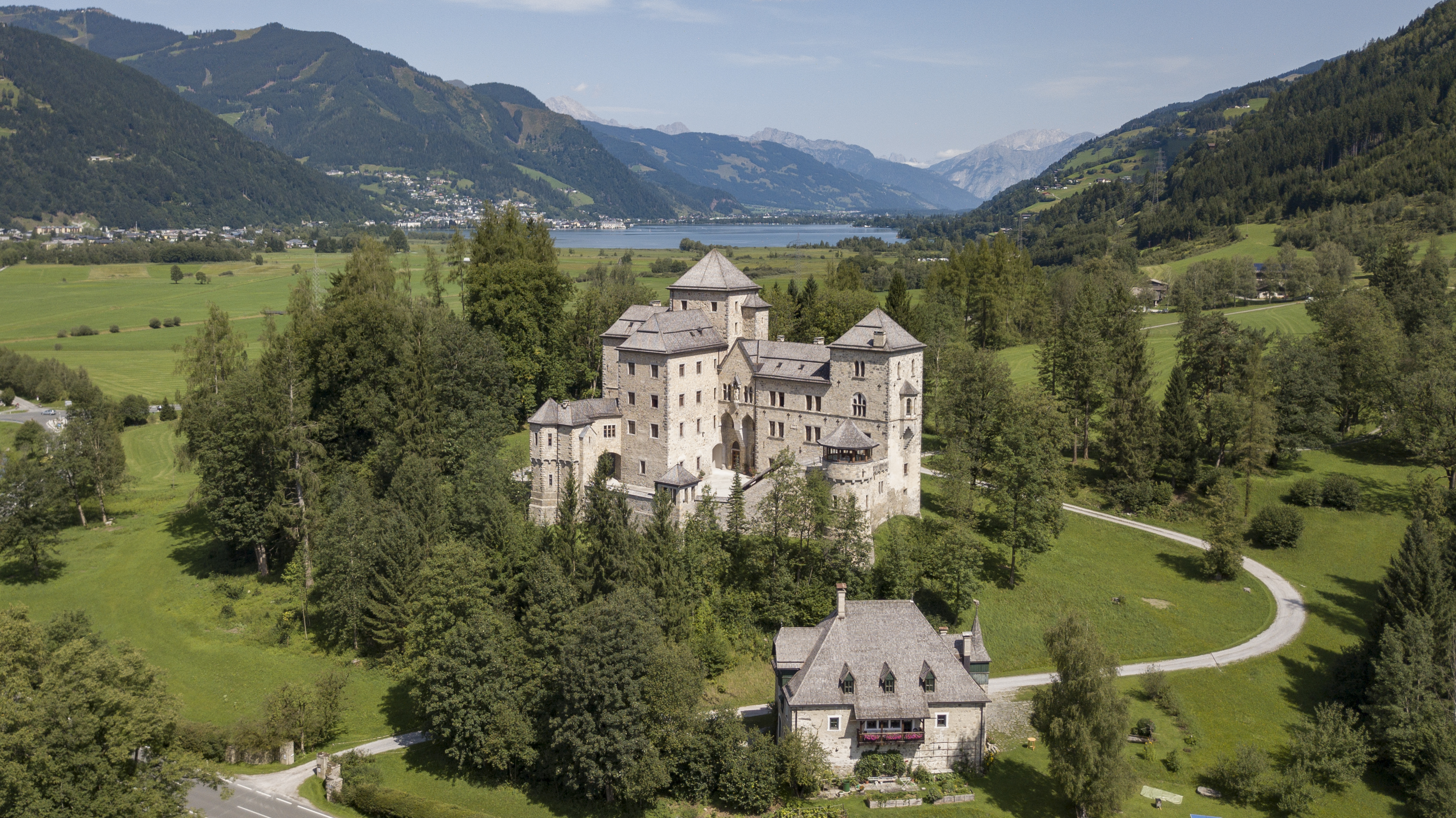
Fischhorn Castle

At the same time, the castle of Vischarn first appeared in the records, initially held as a fief by the Lords of Goldegg, later a possession of the Bishops of Chiemsee. The building was purchased by Princess Sophie of Liechtenstein and her brother Prince Johann II in 1862, who had it rebuilt in a Neo-Gothic style according to plans designed by Friedrich Schmidt. Again rebuilt after a blaze in 1920, it was seized by the Nazi SS organisation in 1943 and temporarily served as a subcamp of Dachau concentration camp. On 8 May 1945, American troops of the VIIe Army arrested Hermann Göring here before he was taken to Camp Ashcan.

Since the completion of the Grossglockner High Alpine Road in 1935, the city has been called Bruck an der Großglocknerstraße ("Bridge at the Grossglockner road"). In 1938, the independent village of Sankt Georgen was incorporated.

== Coat of arms ==
After the Second World War, in Bruck's efforts to create a separate community stepped up arms again, there was a new draft, which was included in the former official seal of the municipality. This seal had included the then-unofficial emblem Eismadonna (iron madonna) as a coat of arms. Considering the fact that several communities in the region of Pinzgau, from a long time ago, had also used the Madonna's heraldic symbol, it had been discouraged by this kind of arms design.

As provided in the following years, but again the link with the town's name of the bridge over the river, a crook was added to the former seal, symbolizing the close association with the Lord on Fischhorn Castle, the Bishop of Chiemsee. This kind of presentation of a herald was welcomed with little enthusiasm.

After long deliberation, it was decided then at least to a so-called speaking of arms, which was created by Prof. Mag Gerd Nowotny and then from the Salzburg provincial government on 17 September 1976, the town was also awarded: the coat of arms shows, in a silver shield, a three-peaked green mountain, with a silver bridge, in front, crossing along a river.

It is expressed therefore, in the coat of arms, as the bridge over the Salzach River, the name of the place and the connection with St. George brought about by the Three Brothers symbolized expression.

== Politics ==
The local council of Bruck an der Großglocknerstraße has 21 members and is made up from local council elections since 2024 as follows:

Party	Seats
Austrian People's Party (ÖVP)	12
Social Democratic Party of Austria (SPÖ)	5
Greens	2
Für unser Bruck (FBU)	2

The directly elected mayor is Barbara Huber (ÖVP).

== Transportation ==
The Grossglockner High Alpine Road, as a high-altitude mountain road, connects the two Austrian provinces of Salzburg and Carinthia. The span from Bruck to Heiligenblut along the road is 47.8 kilometres (29.7 mi) long. At Bruck-Fusch station the municipality has access to the Salzburg-Tyrol Railway line.
