= Viehhofen =

- Municipality
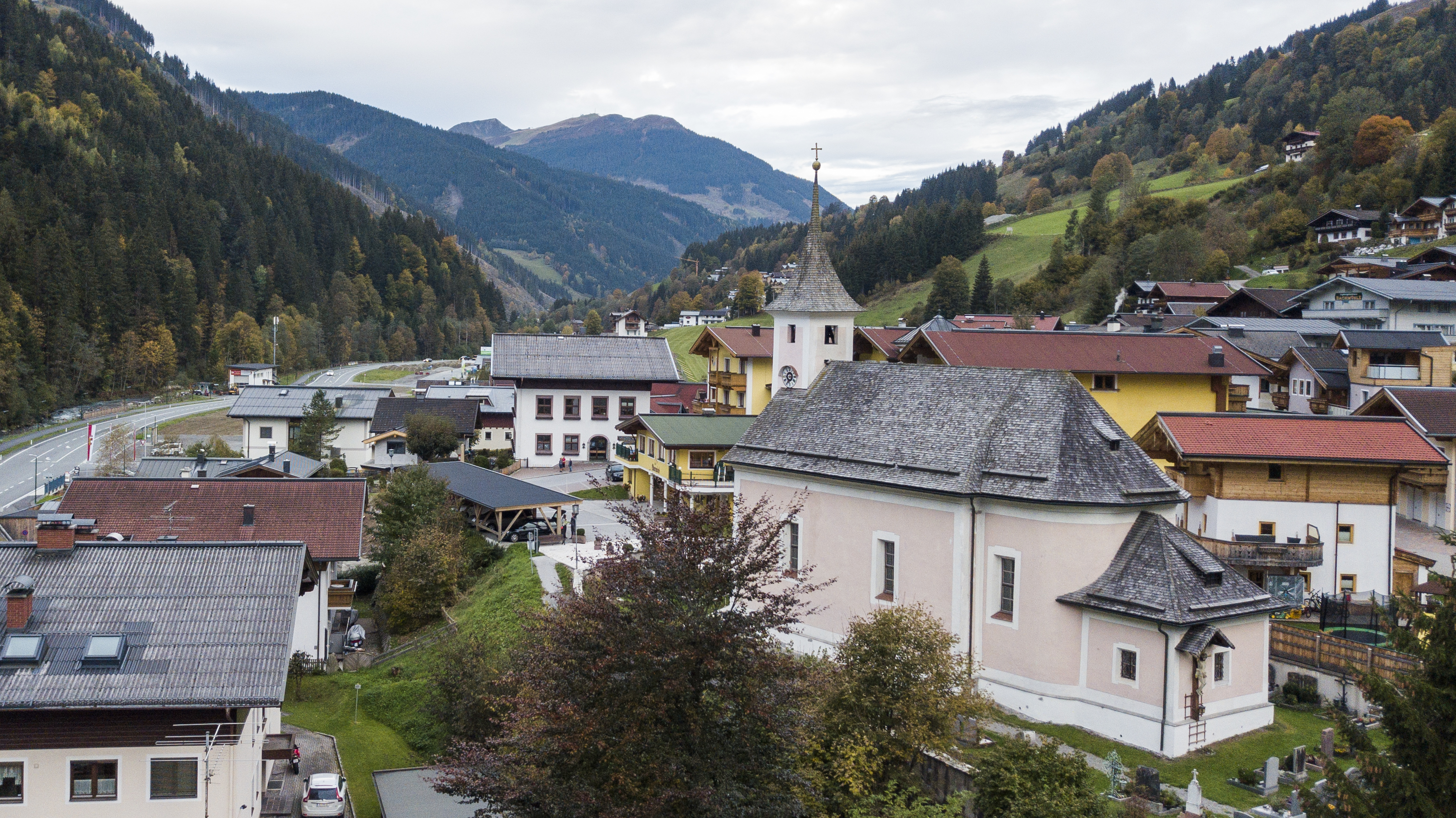

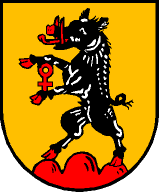
- Coat of arms

- Location within Austria
- Coordinates: 47°22′00″N 12°43′00″E
- Country: Austria
- State: Salzburg
- District: Zell am See

Government
  - Mayor: Reinhard Breitfuss (ÖVP)

Area
  - Total: 38.63 km^{2} (14.92 sq mi)
- Elevation: 856 m (2,808 ft)

Population (2018-01-01)
  - Total: 603
  - Density: 15.6/km^{2} (40.4/sq mi)
- Time zone: UTC+1 (CET)
  - Summer (DST): UTC+2 (CEST)
- Postal code: 5752
- Area code: 06542
- Vehicle registration: ZE
- Website: www.viehhofen.at

Viehhofen is a municipality in the district of Zell am See (Pinzgau region), in the state of Salzburg in Austria.

The town lies at an elevation of 856 m above sea level in the middle of Glemmtal Valley, through which flows the River Saalach. The valley's main town is our western neighbor, Saalbach-Hinterglemm. To the east, at the entrance to the valley, you will find the village of Maishofen.

The valley is flanked by the Kitzbühel Alps, better known here as the "Pinzgau Grass Mountains". The following mountains surround the village: to our SW, the Oberer Gernkogel (elev. 2,175 m) - highest point in Viehhofen to our SE, the Schmittenhöhe (1,965 m) to our NE, the Sausteige (1,912 m) - which is also the origin of the animal displayed on our coat-of-arms, the boar.

== Population ==
Historical population
| Year | Pop. | ±% |
|---|---|---|
| 1869 | 330 | — |
| 1880 | 303 | −8.2% |
| 1890 | 418 | +38.0% |
| 1900 | 333 | −20.3% |
| 1910 | 366 | +9.9% |
| 1923 | 349 | −4.6% |
| 1934 | 415 | +18.9% |
| 1939 | 386 | −7.0% |
| 1951 | 388 | +0.5% |
| 1961 | 406 | +4.6% |
| 1971 | 442 | +8.9% |
| 1981 | 537 | +21.5% |
| 1991 | 557 | +3.7% |
| 2001 | 635 | +14.0% |
| 2011 | 584 | −8.0% |

== Viehofen forced-labor camp ==
The Viehofen forced-labor camp, near St. Pölten, Austria, held approximately 150-180 Jewish prisoners, including the Balog family, who were transported from Subotica, Yugoslavia, in July 1944. This account, based on the recollections of Greta and Olga Balog, details the harsh conditions of the camp, where prisoners were forced to construct a dam on the Traisen River. Dr. Ernst Balog, the family patriarch and a physician, served as the camp's de facto leader, managing sanitation and medical needs. The camp's location, near industrial sites, was part of a network of forced-labor camps in the area, including camps for Ukrainian and other nationalities. While the local guards were relatively lenient, SS visits brought brutality. Prisoners endured hunger, disease, and the constant threat of violence, with some attempting escape. Despite the dire circumstances, the Balog family, including young Greta and Olga, navigated the camp's challenges, with Greta even organizing a makeshift school for the children. The camp operated until April 1945, when its inmates were sent on a death march to Mauthausen.
