= Unken =

- Municipality
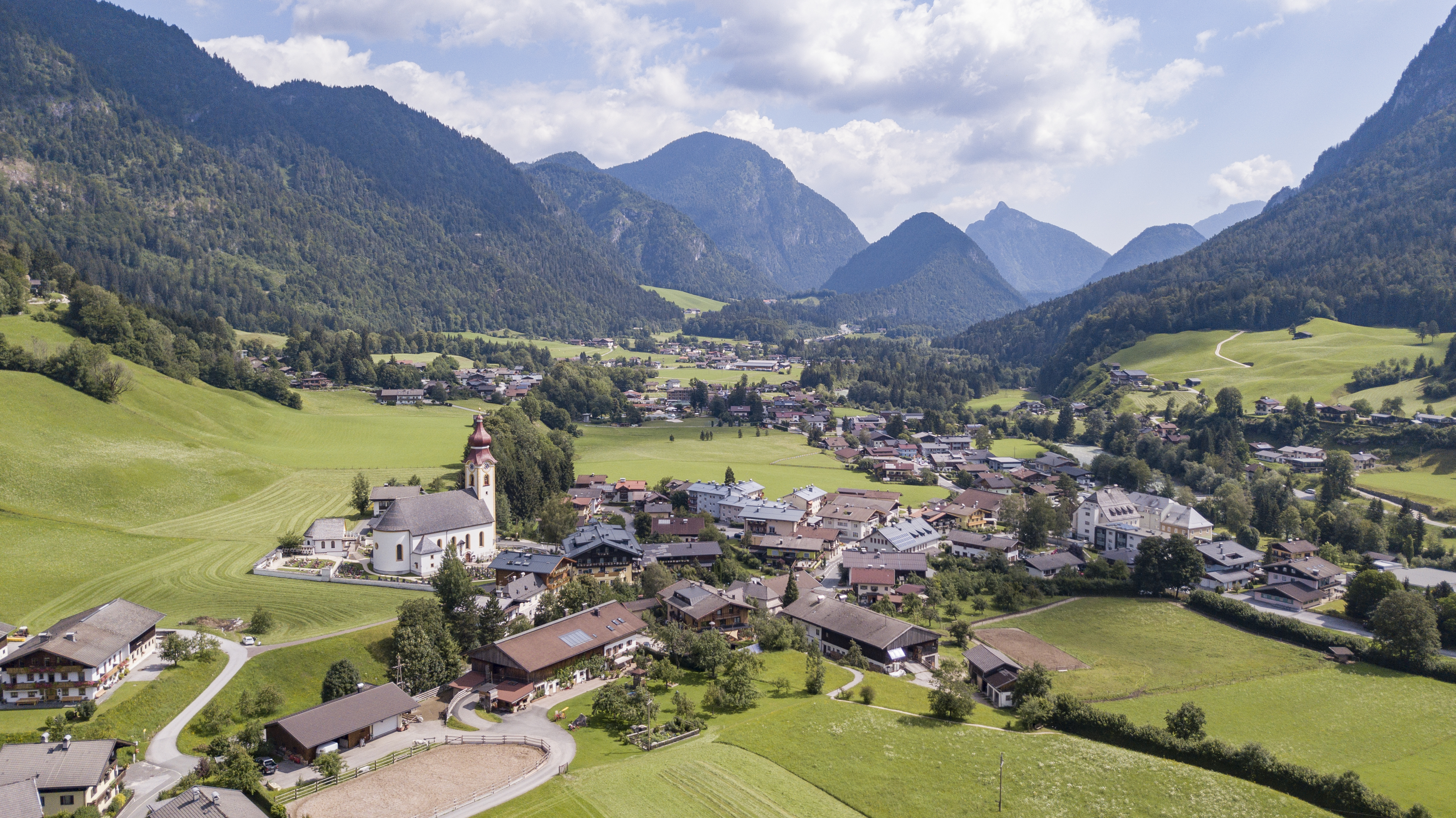

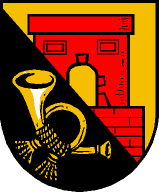
- Coat of arms

- Location within Austria
- Coordinates: 47°39′00″N 12°43′00″E
- Country: Austria
- State: Salzburg
- District: Zell am See

Government
  - Mayor: Hubert Lohfeyer (ÖVP)

Area
  - Total: 108.81 km^{2} (42.01 sq mi)
- Elevation: 564 m (1,850 ft)

Population (2018-01-01)
  - Total: 1,954
  - Density: 17.96/km^{2} (46.51/sq mi)
- Time zone: UTC+1 (CET)
  - Summer (DST): UTC+2 (CEST)
- Postal code: 5091
- Area code: 06589
- Vehicle registration: ZE
- Website: www.gemeinde-unken.at

Unken is a municipality in the district of Zell am See (Pinzgau region), in the state of Salzburg in Austria.

== Population ==
Historical population
Year	Pop.	±%
1869	1,022	—
1880	1,046	+2.3%
1890	1,033	−1.2%
1900	1,140	+10.4%
1910	1,213	+6.4%
1923	1,191	−1.8%
1934	1,284	+7.8%
1939	1,241	−3.3%
1951	1,483	+19.5%
1961	1,545	+4.2%
1971	1,683	+8.9%
1981	1,974	+17.3%
1991	1,920	−2.7%
2001	1,956	+1.9%
2011	1,925	−1.6%
