= Lend, Austria =

Lend
- Municipality
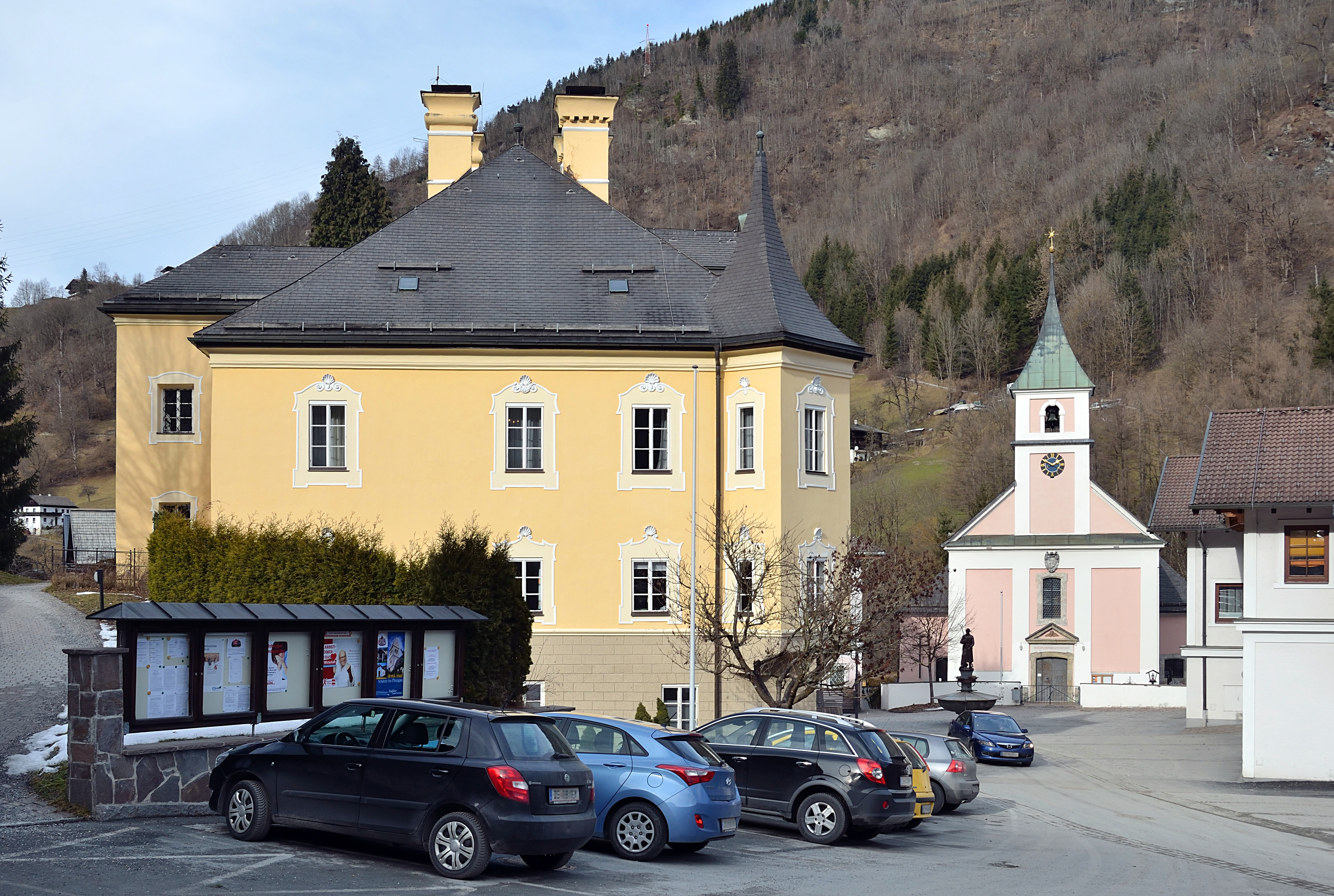
- Centre of Lend

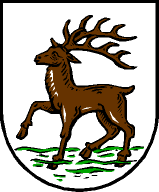
- Coat of arms

- Location within Austria
- Coordinates: 47°18′00″N 13°03′00″E
- Country: Austria
- State: Salzburg
- District: Zell am See

Government
  - Mayor: Michaela Höfelsauer (SPÖ)

Area
  - Total: 29.4 km^{2} (11.4 sq mi)
- Elevation: 663 m (2,175 ft)

Population (2018-01-01)
  - Total: 1,368
  - Density: 46.5/km^{2} (121/sq mi)
- Time zone: UTC+1 (CET)
  - Summer (DST): UTC+2 (CEST)
- Postal code: 5651
- Area code: 06416
- Vehicle registration: ZE
- Website: www.lend.at

Lend (German pronunciation: [lɛnt]) is a municipality in the district of Zell am See (Pinzgau region), in the state of Salzburg in Austria. Elevation: 2,175′

== Population ==
Historical population
Year	Pop.	±%
1869	900	—
1880	1,106	+22.9%
1890	1,210	+9.4%
1900	1,515	+25.2%
1910	1,761	+16.2%
1923	1,727	−1.9%
1934	2,085	+20.7%
1939	2,198	+5.4%
1951	2,253	+2.5%
1961	2,175	−3.5%
1971	2,093	−3.8%
1981	1,846	−11.8%
1991	1,633	−11.5%
2001	1,604	−1.8%
2011	1,411	−12.0%
2018	1,368	−3.0%
