= Stuhlfelden =

- Municipality
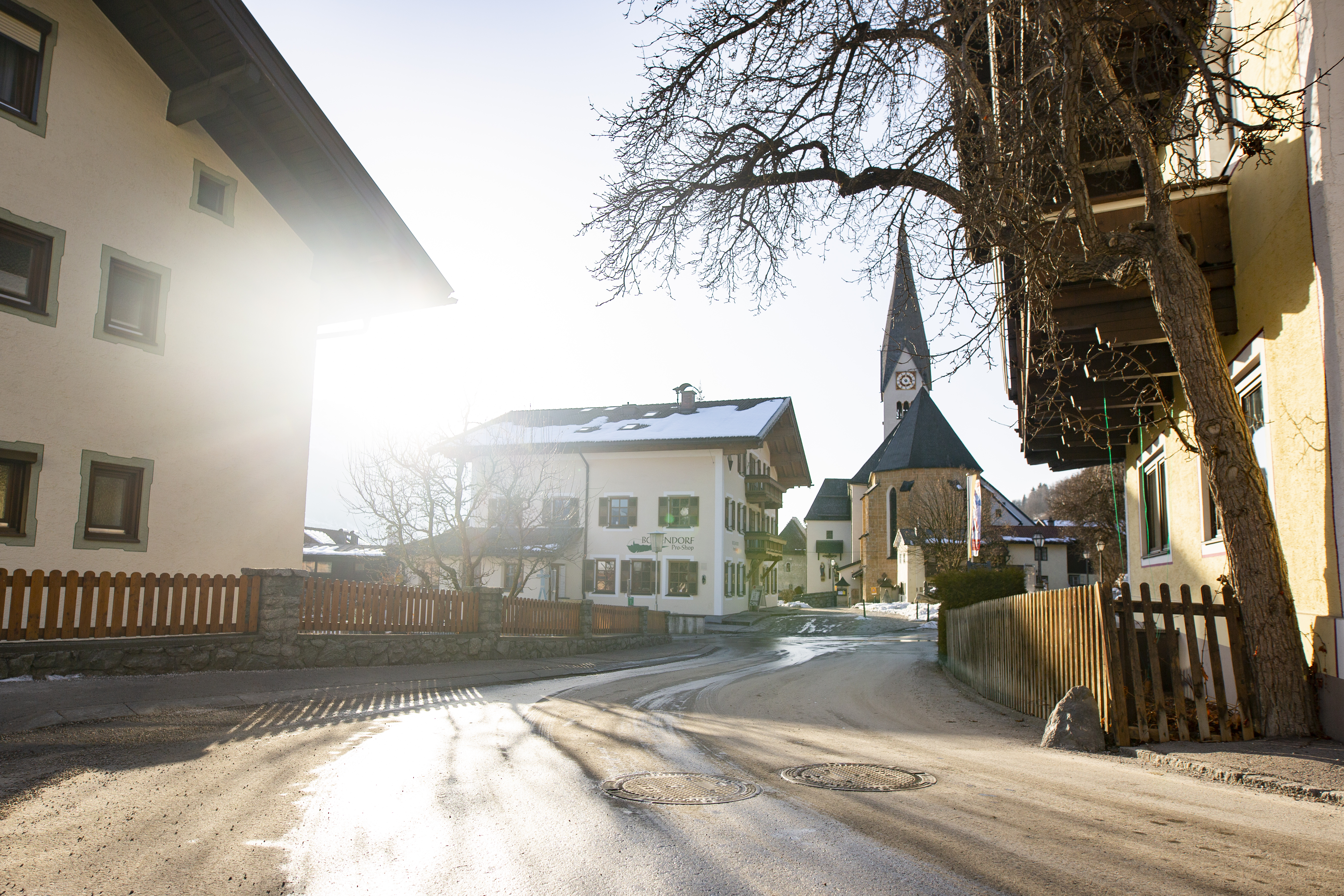

- Coat of arms

- Location within Austria
- Coordinates: 47°16′00″N 12°31′00″E
- Country: Austria
- State: Salzburg
- District: Zell am See

Government
  - Mayor: Sonja Ottenbacher (ÖVP)

Area
  - Total: 29.73 km^{2} (11.48 sq mi)
- Elevation: 800 m (2,600 ft)

Population (2018-01-01)
  - Total: 1,604
  - Density: 53.95/km^{2} (139.7/sq mi)
- Time zone: UTC+1 (CET)
  - Summer (DST): UTC+2 (CEST)
- Postal code: 5724
- Area code: 06562
- Vehicle registration: ZE
- Website: www.stuhlfelden.salzburg.at

Stuhlfelden is a municipality in the district of Zell am See (Pinzgau region), in the state of Salzburg in Austria.

== Population ==
Historical population
Year	Pop.	±%
1869	669	—
1880	682	+1.9%
1890	639	−6.3%
1900	725	+13.5%
1910	723	−0.3%
1923	754	+4.3%
1934	842	+11.7%
1939	977	+16.0%
1951	990	+1.3%
1961	1,087	+9.8%
1971	1,266	+16.5%
1981	1,352	+6.8%
1991	1,388	+2.7%
2001	1,539	+10.9%
2011	1,545	+0.4%
