= Zell am See District =

Coordinates: 47.35°N 12.7°E

Zell am See District Bezirk Zell am See
- District
- Country: Austria
- State: Salzburg
- Number of municipalities: 28
- Administrative seat: Zell am See

Government
  - District Governor: Bernhard Gratz

Area
  - Total: 2,640.85 km^{2} (1,019.64 sq mi)

Population (2001)
  - Total: 86,923
  - Density: 32.915/km^{2} (85.249/sq mi)
- Time zone: UTC+01:00 (CET)
  - Summer (DST): UTC+02:00 (CEST)
- Vehicle registration: ZE

Historical population
Year	Pop.	±%
1869	29,509	—
1880	31,303	+6.1%
1890	32,189	+2.8%
1900	35,019	+8.8%
1910	37,831	+8.0%
1923	38,554	+1.9%
1934	43,215	+12.1%
1939	45,555	+5.4%
1951	56,176	+23.3%
1961	58,009	+3.3%
1971	66,454	+14.6%
1981	71,811	+8.1%
1991	77,277	+7.6%
2001	84,124	+8.9%

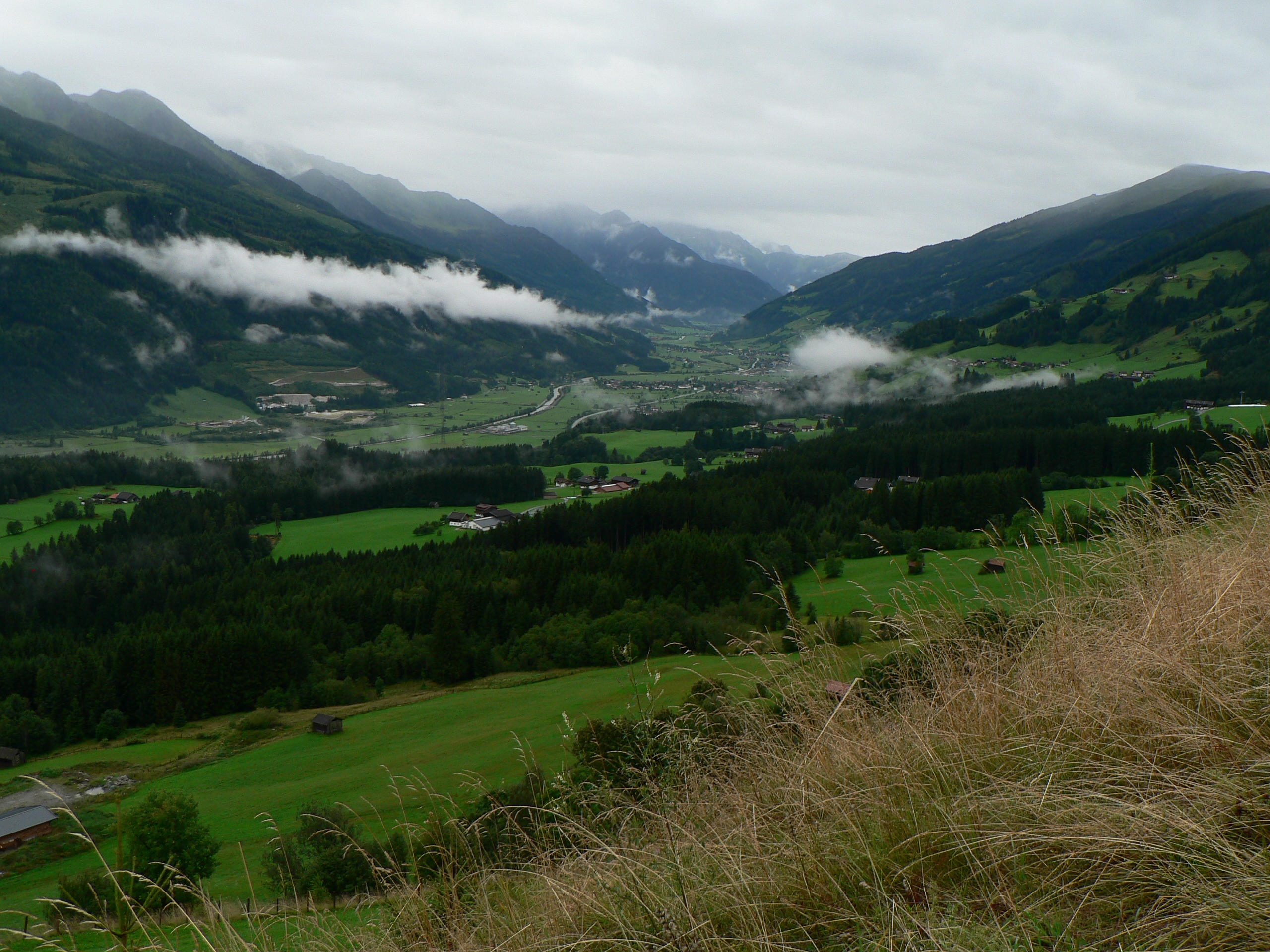
Upper Pinzgau Valley

The Bezirk Zell am See is an administrative district (Bezirk) in the federal state of Salzburg, Austria, and congruent with the Pinzgau region (pronunciation in German: [ˈpʰɪnt͡sˌɡ̊aʊ̯]).

The area of the district is 2,640.85 square kilometres (1,019.64 sq mi), with a population of 84,124 (May 15, 2001), and population density 32 persons per km^{2}. The administrative center of the district is Zell am See. It is a two-hour transfer to resort from Salzburg Airport. The region's biggest town is Saalfelden with a population of 20,000.

== Administrative divisions ==
The district is divided into 28 municipalities, three of them are towns, and four of them are market towns.

=== Towns ===
1. Saalfelden am Steinernen Meer (15,093)
2. Zell am See (9,638)
3. Mittersill (5,930)

=== Market towns ===
1. Lofer (1,943)
2. Neukirchen am Großvenediger (2,616)
3. Rauris (3,107)
4. Taxenbach (2,918)

=== Municipalities ===
1. Bramberg am Wildkogel (3,895)
2. Bruck an der Großglocknerstraße (4,430)
3. Dienten am Hochkönig (800)
4. Fusch an der Großglocknerstraße (754)
5. Hollersbach im Pinzgau (1,159)
6. Kaprun (2,903)
7. Krimml (886)
8. Lend (1,604)
9. Leogang (3,035)
10. Maishofen (3,026)
11. Maria Alm (2,143)
12. Niedernsill (2,413)
13. Piesendorf (3,481)
14. Saalbach-Hinterglemm (3,020)
15. St. Martin bei Lofer (1,151)
16. Stuhlfelden (1,539)
17. Unken (1,956)
18. Uttendorf (2,813)
19. Viehhofen (635)
20. Wald im Pinzgau (1,176)
21. Weißbach bei Lofer (406)

(population numbers May 15, 2001)

== Tourist attractions ==
- Castle Saalhof
- Grossglockner Hochalpenstrasse
- Krimmler Falls
- Pinzgauer Lokalbahn
