= Hollersbach im Pinzgau =

Hollersbach im Pinzgau Hoierschbouch an Pinzgau
- Municipality
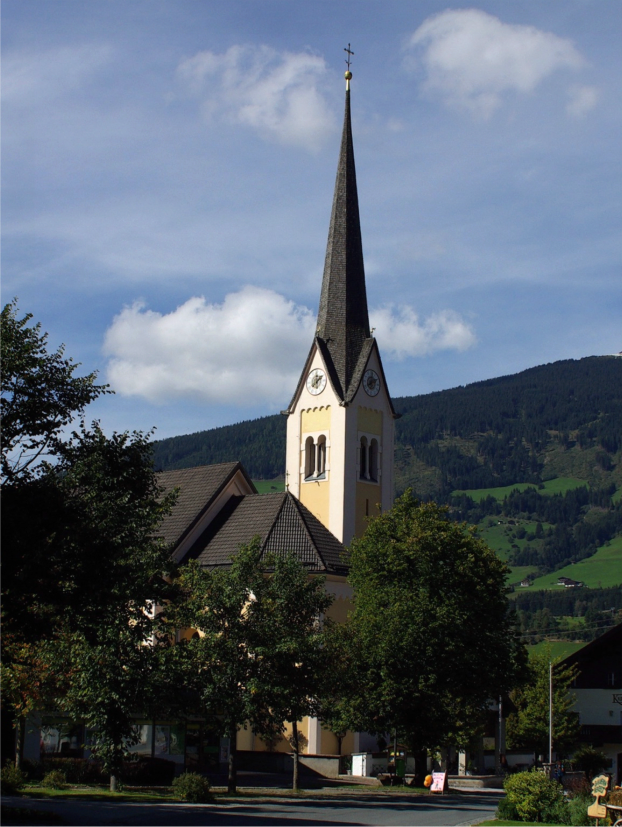
- Hollersbach parish church

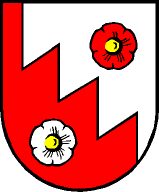
- Coat of arms

- Location within Austria Hollersbach im Pinzgau (Austria)
- Coordinates: 47°16′00″N 12°25′00″E
- Country: Austria
- State: Salzburg
- District: Zell am See

Government
  - Mayor: Günter Steiner (ÖVP)

Area
  - Total: 76.89 km^{2} (29.69 sq mi)
- Elevation: 806 m (2,644 ft)

Population (2018-01-01)
  - Total: 1,220
  - Density: 15.9/km^{2} (41.1/sq mi)
- Time zone: UTC+1 (CET)
  - Summer (DST): UTC+2 (CEST)
- Postal code: 5731
- Area code: 06562
- Vehicle registration: ZE
- Website: www.hollersbach.salzburg.at

Hollersbach im Pinzgau (Bavarian: Hoierschbouch an Pinzgau) is a municipality in the district of Zell am See (Pinzgau region), in the state of Salzburg in Austria. The population (as of May 2001) is 1159.

== Overview ==
Yearly, in the end of September, it holds a festival that celebrates the time when the cows come down from the alps (where they stay during the warm seasons) to the stables in the city where they stay during the winter.

== Economy ==
Its main economic activities are tourism and dairy farming.

In 2005 a cable-car that connects the city with the famous skiing region of Kitzbuehel was built, this brought a boost to real-estate in the municipality.
