= Uttendorf =

- Municipality
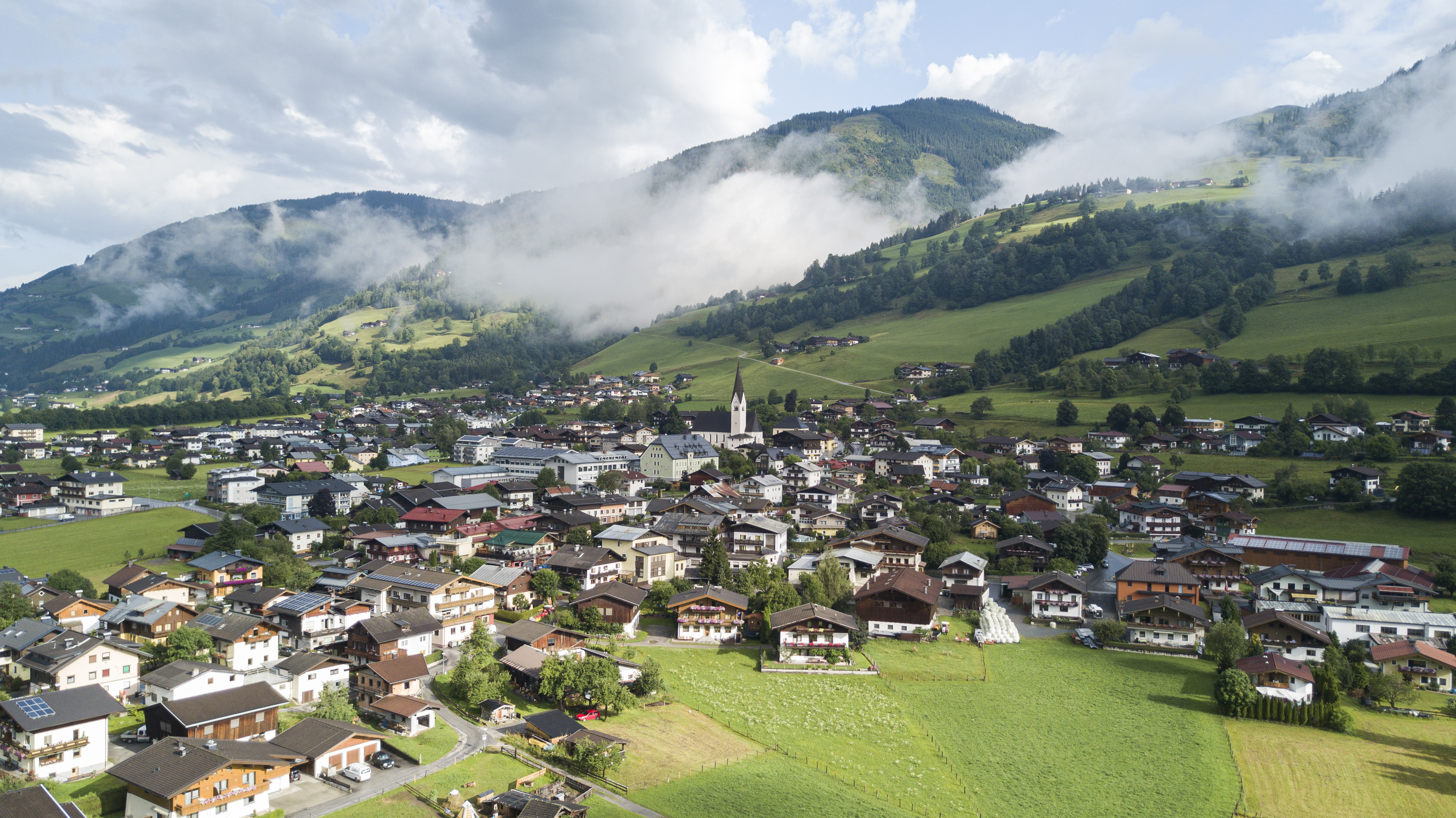
- View of Uttendorf

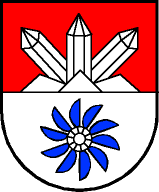
- Coat of arms

- Location within Austria
- Coordinates: 47°16′00″N 12°34′00″E
- Country: Austria
- State: Salzburg
- District: Zell am See

Government
  - Mayor: Hannes Lerchbaumer (SPÖ)

Area
  - Total: 167.97 km^{2} (64.85 sq mi)
- Elevation: 804 m (2,638 ft)

Population (2018-01-01)
  - Total: 2,982
  - Density: 17.75/km^{2} (45.98/sq mi)
- Time zone: UTC+1 (CET)
  - Summer (DST): UTC+2 (CEST)
- Postal code: 5723
- Area code: 06563
- Vehicle registration: ZE
- Website: www.uttendorf.at

Uttendorf is a municipality in the district of Zell am See (Pinzgau region), in the state of Salzburg in Austria.

== Population ==
Historical population
Year	Pop.	±%
1869	1,345	—
1880	1,289	−4.2%
1890	1,283	−0.5%
1900	1,296	+1.0%
1910	1,403	+8.3%
1923	1,629	+16.1%
1934	1,633	+0.2%
1939	1,836	+12.4%
1951	2,415	+31.5%
1961	2,347	−2.8%
1971	2,616	+11.5%
1981	2,668	+2.0%
1991	2,746	+2.9%
2001	2,813	+2.4%
2011	2,891	+2.8%

== Climate ==
The Köppen Climate Classification sub-type for this climate is "ET" (Tundra Climate).

Climate data for Uttendorf
Month	Jan	Feb	Mar	Apr	May	Jun	Jul	Aug	Sep	Oct	Nov	Dec	Year
Mean daily maximum °C (°F)	0 (32)	3 (37)	8 (47)	13 (56)	19 (66)	21 (70)	23 (73)	23 (73)	18 (65)	13 (56)	6 (42)	1 (33)	12 (54)
Mean daily minimum °C (°F)	−8 (17)	−7 (20)	−3 (27)	1 (34)	5 (41)	8 (47)	11 (51)	10 (50)	7 (44)	2 (36)	−3 (27)	−7 (20)	1 (34)
Average precipitation mm (inches)	48 (1.9)	38 (1.5)	58 (2.3)	66 (2.6)	100 (4.1)	150 (6)	180 (6.9)	150 (6)	100 (4.1)	76 (3)	64 (2.5)	64 (2.5)	1,100 (43.4)
Source: Weatherbase
