= Neukirchen am Großvenediger =

- Municipality
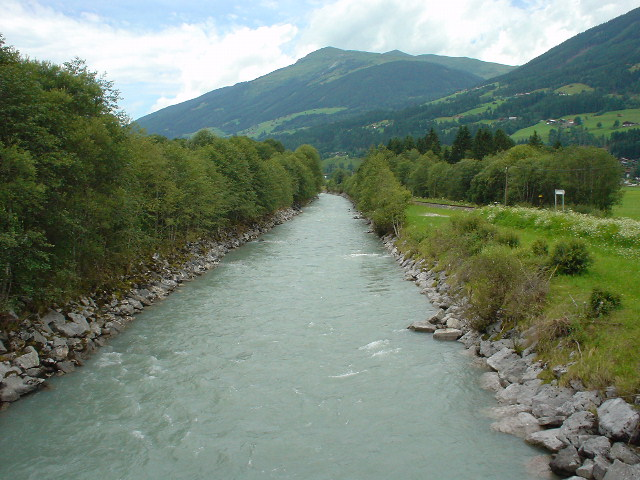
- Salzach river near Neukirchen

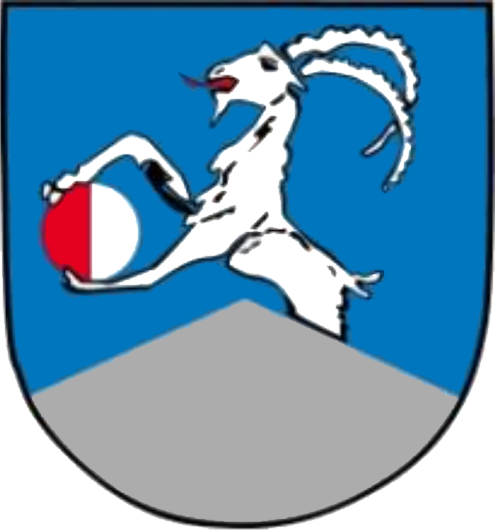
- Coat of arms

- Location within Austria
- Coordinates: 47°15′00″N 12°16′00″E
- Country: Austria
- State: Salzburg
- District: Zell am See

Government
  - Mayor: Andreas Schweinberger (ÖVP)

Area
  - Total: 165.87 km^{2} (64.04 sq mi)
- Elevation: 858 m (2,815 ft)

Population (2018-01-01)
  - Total: 2,517
  - Density: 15.17/km^{2} (39.30/sq mi)
- Time zone: UTC+1 (CET)
  - Summer (DST): UTC+2 (CEST)
- Postal code: 5741
- Area code: 06565
- Vehicle registration: ZE
- Website: www.neukirchen.at

Neukirchen am Großvenediger is a market town in the district of Zell am See (Pinzgau region), in the state of Salzburg in Austria. Neukirchen is at an altitude of 856 meters and its population (as of May 2001) is 2,616.

== Externan links ==
Media related to Neukirchen am Großvenediger at Wikimedia Commons
