= Saalbach-Hinterglemm =

- Municipality
- Coat of arms

- Location within Austria
- Coordinates: 47.3904°N 12.6370°E
- Country: Austria
- State: Salzburg
- District: Zell am See

Government
  - Mayor: Alois Hasenauer (ÖVP)

Area
  - Total: 125.47 km^{2} (48.44 sq mi)
- Elevation: 1,003 m (3,291 ft)

Population (2018-01-01)
  - Total: 2,859
  - Density: 22.79/km^{2} (59.02/sq mi)
- Time zone: UTC+1 (CET)
  - Summer (DST): UTC+2 (CEST)
- Postal code: 5753
- Area code: 06541
- Vehicle registration: ZE
- Website: www.saalbach.or.at

Saalbach-Hinterglemm is a municipality in the district of Zell am See (Pinzgau region), in the Austrian state of Salzburg. It is well known for its skiing and other winter sports. A four-piste network consisting of Saalbach, Hinterglemm, Fieberbrunn and Leogang is located in the municipality, adding up to 270 kilometres (170 mi) of ski slopes. It is short transfer to resort from Salzburg Airport.

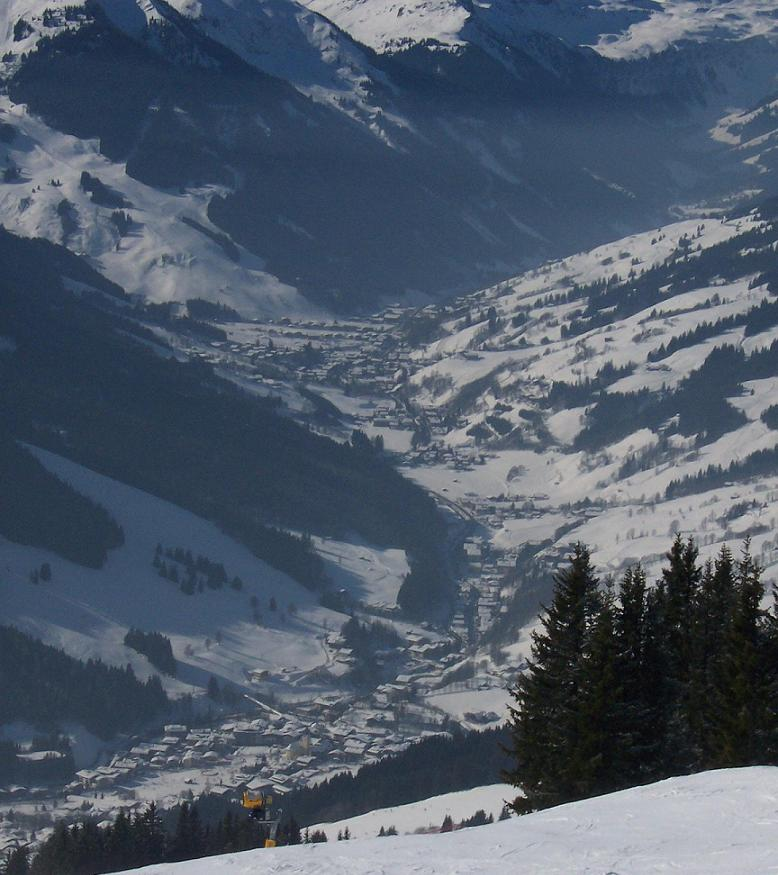
Saalbach-Hinterglemm from Bründlkopf

== Geography ==
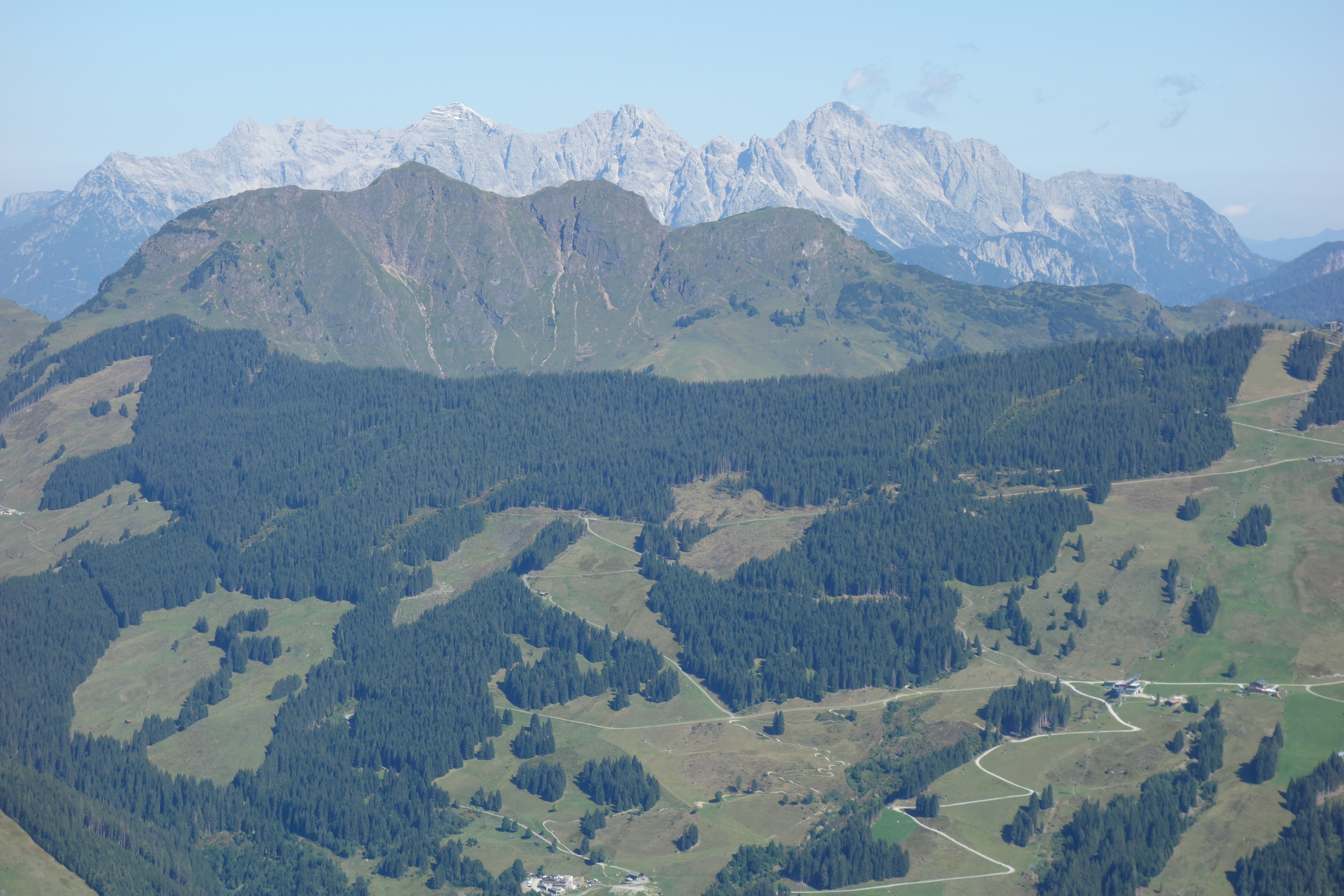
Spielberghorn

Saalbach-Hinterglemm is in the Pinzgau region, in the Saalbach Valley, which is oriented east–west. The region is part of the Kitzbüheler Alpen. The highest point is Spielberghorn (2,044 metres/6,706 ft) in the north and Hochkogel (2,249 metres/7,379 ft) in the south.

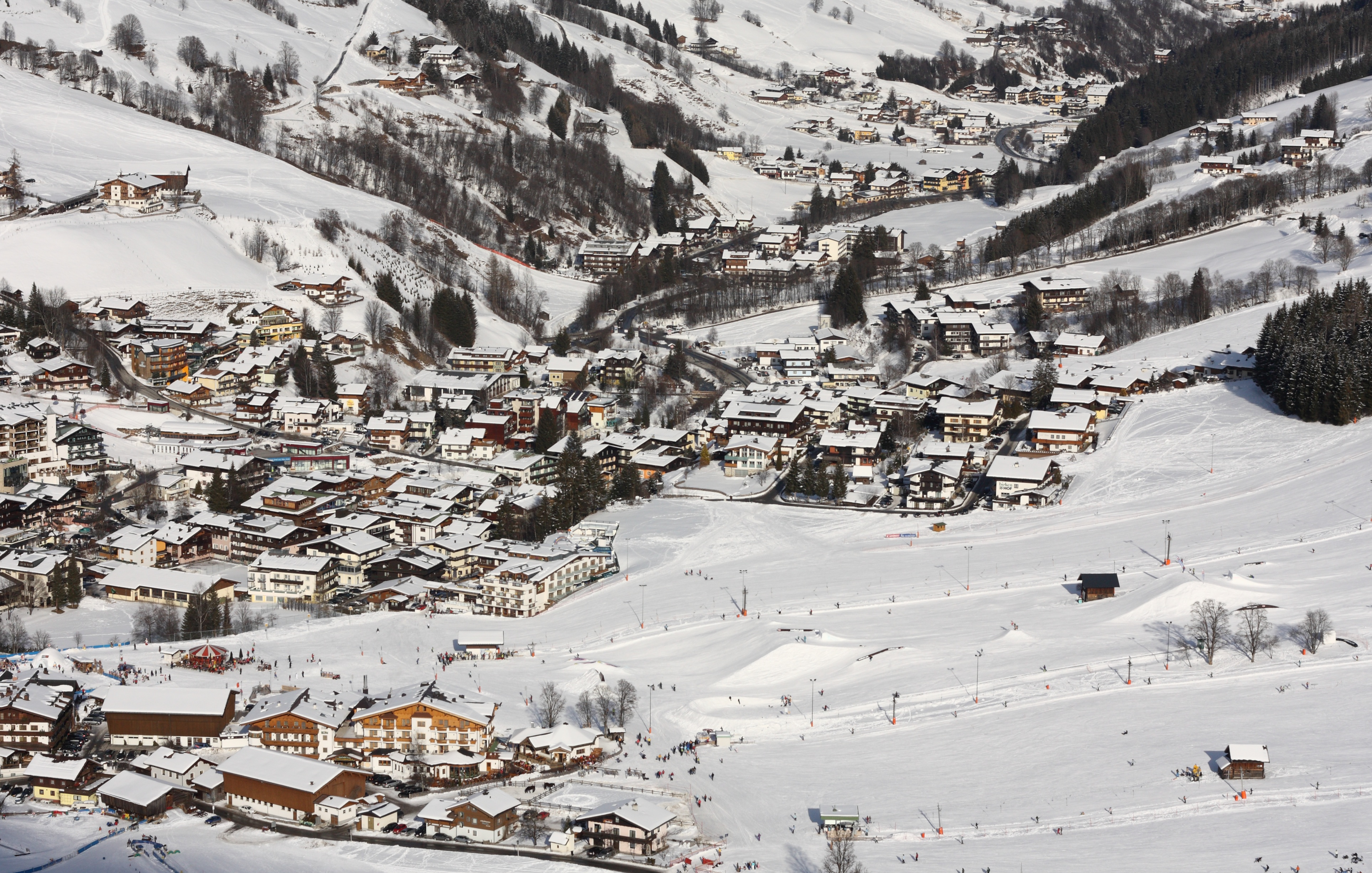
Hinterglemm in February 2010

The nearest larger town is Zell am See, about 20 kilometres (12 mi) away. The municipality consists of two small towns: Saalbach and Hinterglemm, which each make up several Katastralgemeinden.

== History ==
The oldest evidence of settlements in the municipality stems from 1222. The name Salpach first showed up in 1350. Before 1410 there was a church in the town. In 1489 archbishop Johann Beckensloer gave the town market rights, but Saalbach remained, for the most part, a poor agrarian community up into the 20th century.

In May 1945, about 1000 men of Jagdgeschwader 27 (JG 27) Afrika, a World War II Luftwaffe Geschwader, famous for service in the North African Campaign supporting the Afrika Korps, marched here from their last base in Salzburg to surrender to American troops occupying the village.

After the end of the war, tourists began arriving in the same 1945, and the village started to know a lasting increase in prosperity. In 1987 Saalbach's name was changed to Saalbach-Hinterglemm.

== Sports and recreation ==
The town of Saalbach is primarily orientated towards tourism, and many of the inhabitants' jobs are either directly or indirectly dependent on this industry.

Between 22 January and 3 February 1991, the FIS Alpine World Ski Championships took place in Saalbach-Hinterglemm. It has also been the venue for the British University Snowsports Championships (BUSC) and the British Royal Air Force Championships on several occasions.

== Coat of arms ==
The municipality's coat of arms is described as A red shield with two diagonally-crossed golden skis. They are accompanied by a silver snowflake above them and three silver balls resting on top of each other at the bottom. On top of all this is an undulating silver bar.

== Tourism ==
Saalbach-Hinterglemm

Climate chart (precipitation, max. and min. temperature)
J	F	M	A	M	J	J	A	S	O	N	D
101 1 −8	73 3 −7	97 7 −4	83 11 −1	107 17 4	156 19 7	191 21 9	159 21 9	111 18 6	83 13 2	87 5 −4	93 1 −7
- █ Average max. and min. temperatures in °C
- █ Precipitation totals in mm
- Source: ZAMG
Imperial conversion
J	F	M	A	M	J	J	A	S	O	N	D
4 34 18	2.9 37 19	3.8 45 25	3.3 52 30	4.2 63 39	6.1 66 45	7.5 70 48	6.3 70 48	4.4 64 43	3.3 55 36	3.4 41 25	3.7 34 19
- █ Average max. and min. temperatures in °F
- █ Precipitation totals in inches

=== Skiing ===
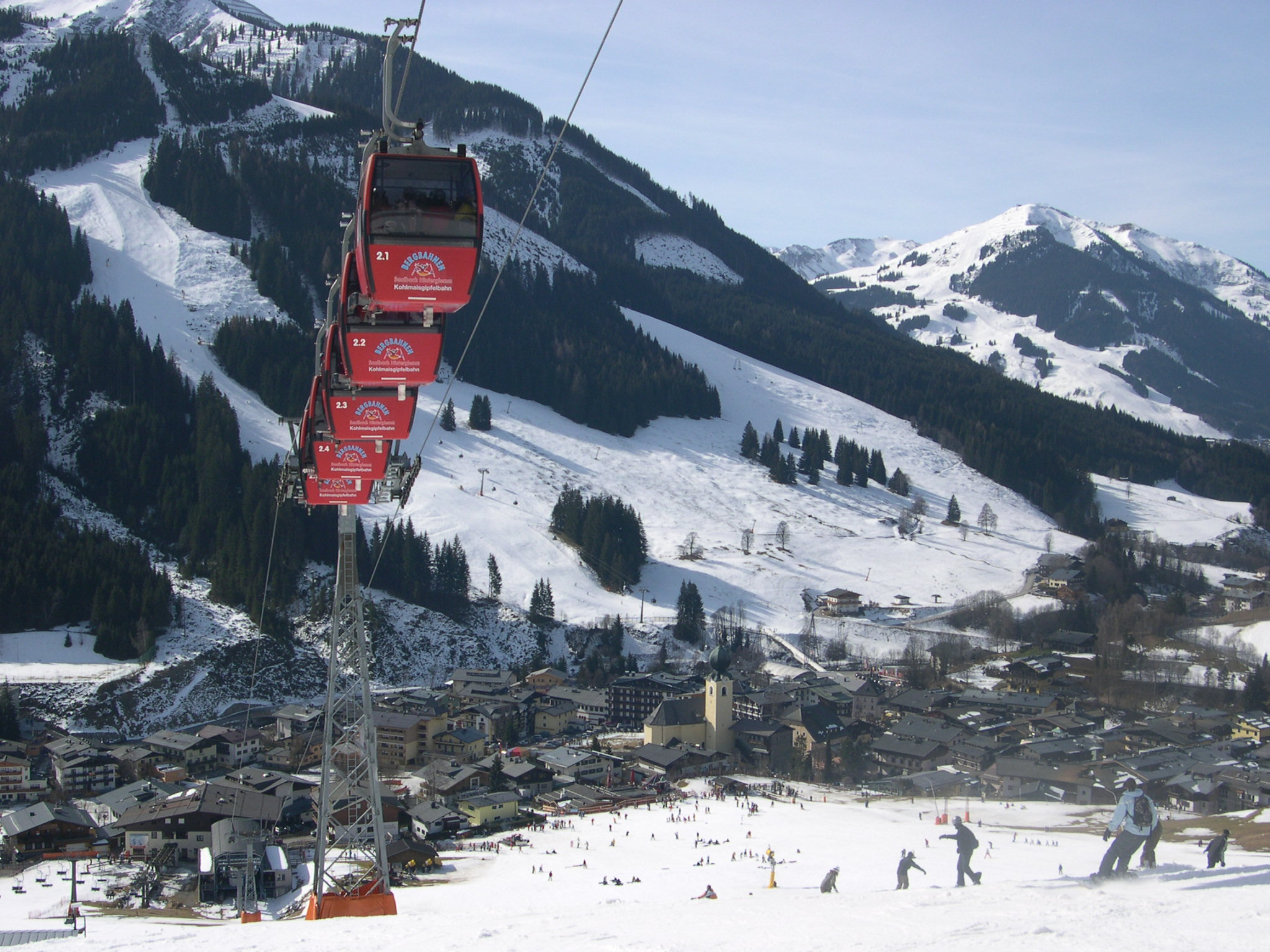
Kohlmaisbahn lift ascending from Saalbach village

Saalbach is one of Austria's premier ski resorts, offering a range of runs, extensive off piste, and a good snow record. Skiing can be found on both sides of the valley. The runs on the north side of the valley (south-facing side) tend to be preferred by visitors because of their sunny weather. The pistes on the south side of the valley (north-facing side) are normally in the shade, so have better snow cover, particularly in late season, as well as more trees. Much of the off-piste skiing is on the north side, where thigh-deep, untouched powder can be found only metres from many of the pistes. There is a small snowpark in Hinterglemm, but experienced snowboarders and skiers prefer to head to the snowpark in the adjacent valley in Leogang, which boasts superior kickers, as well as rails and jibs. Saalbach-Hinterglemm also features 6- and 8-man chairlifts with heated seats and retractable covers for use in bad weather.

== See also ==
- Salzburgerland
- Salzburg

== Notes ==
- Weal, John (2003). Jagdgeschwader 27 'Afrika'. Oxford: Osprey. ISBN 1-84176-538-4.
