= Salzburg (state) =

Austrian state

Coordinates: 47.42°N 13.22°E

- State
- State of Salzburg; Land Salzburg (German); Land Soizbuag (Bavarian)
- Flag Coat of arms
- Anthem: Salzburger Landeshymne
- Country: Austria
- Capital: Salzburg

Government
  - Body: Landtag of Salzburg
  - Governor: Karoline Edtstadler (ÖVP)
  - Deputy Governors: Marlene Svazek (FPÖ); Stefan Schnöll (ÖVP)

Area
  - Total: 7,052.88 km^{2} (2,723.13 sq mi)

Population (2022)
  - Total: 562,606
  - Density: 79.7697/km^{2} (206.603/sq mi)

GDP
  - Total: €37.663 billion (2024)
  - Per capita: €65,844 (2024)
- Time zone: UTC+1 (CET)
  - Summer (DST): UTC+2 (CEST)
- ISO 3166 code: AT-5
- HDI (2022): 0.945 very high · 2nd of 9
- NUTS Region: AT3
- Votes in Bundesrat: 4 (of 62)
- Website: www.salzburg.gv.at

Salzburg (Note: English: /ˈsɔːltsbɜːrɡ/, also UK: /ˈsæltsbɜːrɡ/, US: /ˈsɔːlzbɜːrɡ, ˈsɑːlz-, ˈsælz-, ˈzɑːltsbʊərk/.) (Austrian German: [ˈsaltsbʊrɡ], Northern German: [ˈzaltsbʊʁk]; Bavarian: Soizbuag, also known as Salzburgerland) is a state (Land) of Austria bordering Germany and Italy. In German, its official name is Land Salzburg, to distinguish it from its eponymous capital Salzburg.

The state of Salzburg is closely tied to the former Prince-Archbishopric of Salzburg, an ecclesiastical principality of the Holy Roman Empire that existed for centuries until its secularization in 1803. After the Napoleonic Wars, the territory changed hands several times, becoming part of Austria, then briefly Bavaria, before being permanently incorporated into the Austrian Empire in 1816. In the 20th century, the region became a federated state of Austria and is today known for its Alpine landscapes, cultural heritage, and the annual Salzburg Festival.

== Geography ==
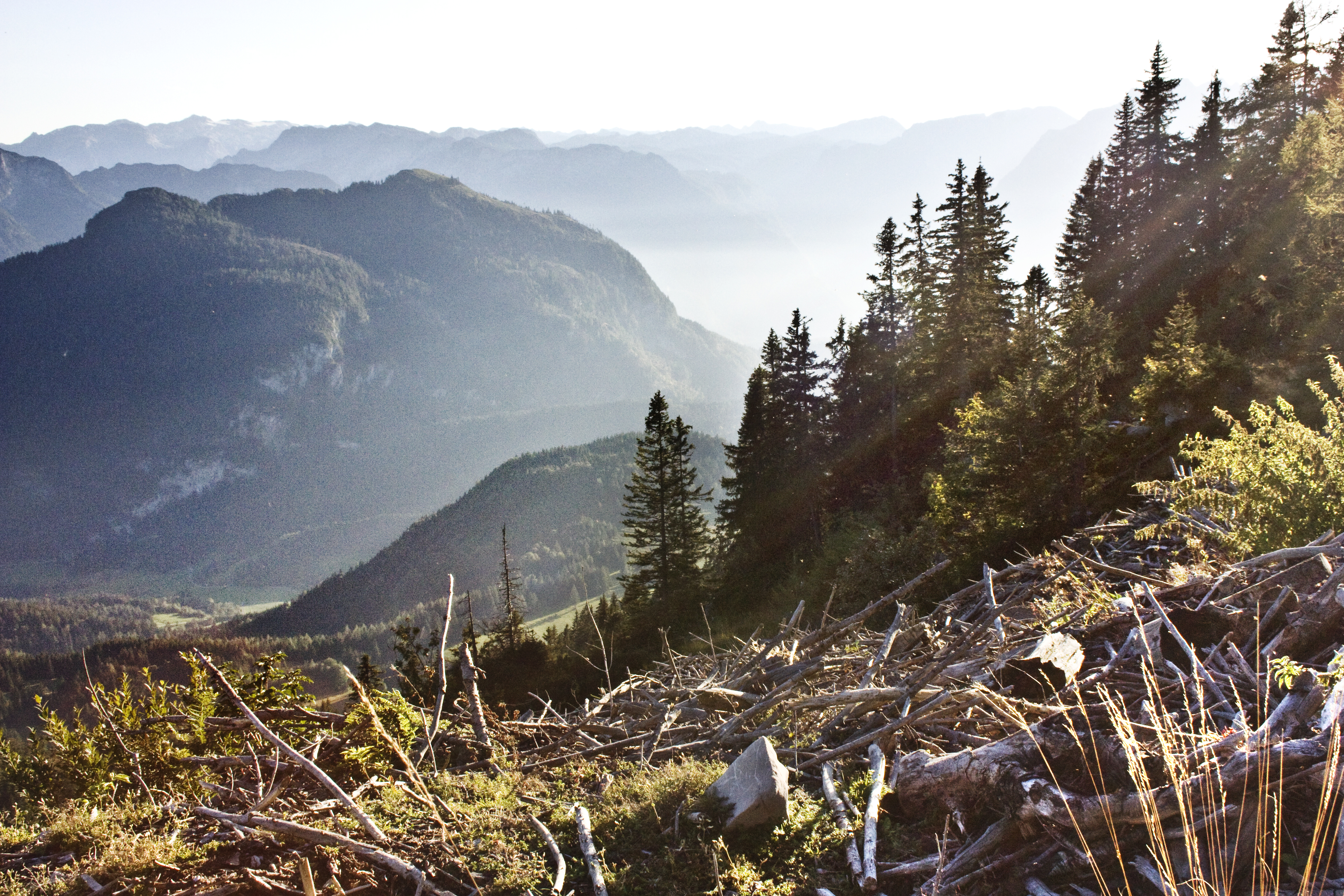
Typical Salzburg Alpine landscape near Sankt Koloman

=== Location ===
Salzburg State covers an area of 7,156 km^{2} (2,763 sq mi). It stretches along its main river — the Salzach – which rises in the Central Eastern Alps in the south to the Alpine foothills in the north. It is located in the north-west of Austria, close to the border with the German state of Bavaria; to the northeast lies the state Upper Austria; Styria to the east, to the south the Austrian states of Carinthia and Tyrol. With 561,714 inhabitants, it is one of Austria' smaller states in terms of population.

Running through the south are the main ranges of the Alpine divide (incl. the Hohe Tauern mountains) with numerous three-thousanders. The Dachstein massif and the Berchtesgaden Alps ranges of the Northern Limestone Alps border Salzburg State to the east and north.

=== Regions ===
The state is traditionally subdivided in five major regions (Gaue), congruent with its political districts (Bezirke, see administrative divisions).

Regions of Salzburg

- In the northern part:
  - Flachgau (Salzburg city and environs), the flat (German: flach) Salzburg Basin around the confluence of Salzach and Saalach, stretching from the slopes of the Salzkammergut Mountains in the east to the Untersberg massif and the Chiemgau Alps in the west.
  - Tennengau (district capital Hallein), named after the Tennen Mountains, including the broad Salzach Valley south of Salzburg and the surrounding ranges of the Limestone Alps.
- The southern, mountainous (colloquially Innergebirg) part is divided into:
  - Pinzgau (Zell am See) in the southwest,
  - Pongau (St. Johann im Pongau) on Salzach and Enns, and
  - Lungau (Tamsweg) in the southeast, separated by the Niedere Tauern range.

=== Major cities and towns ===
Salzburg municipalities with town privileges:

- Salzburg (pop. 148,521)
- Hallein (20,022)
- Saalfelden (16,046)
- St. Johann im Pongau (10,740)
- Bischofshofen (10,352)
- Zell am See (9,683)
- Seekirchen (9,945)
- Neumarkt am Wallersee (5,846)
- Oberndorf bei Salzburg (5,600)
- Mittersill (5,443)
- Radstadt (4,864)

Wals-Siezenheim, a common municipality with about 12,000 inhabitants, is known as 'Austria's largest village'.

== History ==
Salt mining has played an important role in the region's development; Salzburg means "salt city".

=== Salzburg as an independent state ===
Independence from Bavaria was secured in the late 14th century. The Archbishopric of Salzburg was an independent prince-bishopric and State of the Holy Roman Empire until German Mediatisation in 1803.

=== Electorate of Salzburg ===
The territory was secularized and, as the Electorate of Salzburg, given as compensation to Ferdinand III, former Grand Duke of Tuscany, the brother of Emperor Francis II.

=== The end of independence ===
Following the Austrian defeat at Austerlitz in 1805, Salzburg was annexed by Austria as compensation for the loss of Tyrol to the Kingdom of Bavaria, and Ferdinand was transferred to the Grand Duchy of Würzburg.

=== Bavarian Salzburg ===
After Austria's defeat in 1809, the region was handed over to Bavaria in 1810.

=== The country divided between Bavaria and Austria ===
In 1816, following the defeat of Napoleon and the provision of adequate compensation to Bavaria at the Congress of Vienna, it was returned to Austria with the exception of the north-western Rupertiwinkel which remained Bavarian. The Salzburger Land was administered as the department of Salzach from Linz, the capital of Upper Austria. In 1849 the Duchy of Salzburg was established as a crown land of the Austrian Empire and, after 1866, Austria-Hungary.

=== World War I ===
Salzburg participated in World War I, as part of the Austro-Hungarian Empire. 49,000 Salzburgers were called to arms, of whom 6,000 were killed.

=== Post-World War I Austrian republics ===
In 1918 after World War I, the Duchy of Salzburg was dissolved and replaced with the State of Salzburg, as a component part initially of German Austria and subsequently of the First Republic of Austria, the separate state which was mandated by the Allied powers.

In 1921 a plebiscite Salzburg, a majority of 99.11% voted for a unification with Germany.

=== Salzburg in Germany ===
As a result of Germany's annexation of Austria in 1938, Austria, including Salzburg State, was incorporated into Nazi Germany.

=== American control ===
After the defeat of Nazi Germany in 1945, the Allies occupied the territory of Austria, being recognized as an independent territory under their rule. Salzburg State was occupied by the United States.

=== Salzburg as an Austrian state ===
In 1955, Austria was again declared an independent state and Salzburg was once again one of the reconstituted federal states of the Second Republic of Austria.

== Demographics ==
Historical population
Year	Pop.	±%
1869	153,159	—
1880	163,570	+6.8%
1890	173,510	+6.1%
1900	192,763	+11.1%
1910	214,737	+11.4%
1923	222,831	+3.8%
1934	245,801	+10.3%
1939	257,226	+4.6%
1951	327,232	+27.2%
1961	347,292	+6.1%
1971	405,115	+16.6%
1981	442,301	+9.2%
1991	482,365	+9.1%
2001	515,327	+6.8%
2011	529,066	+2.7%
2021	561,714	+6.2%
Source: Censuses

The historical population is given in the following chart:

== Politics ==
Salzburg adopted its current provincial constitution in 1999. The provincial government (Landesregierung) is headed by a governor (Landeshauptmann), who is elected by a majority in the provincial parliament Landtag. Provincial elections are held every five years.

After World War II, most provincial governments were led by the conservative Austrian People's Party (ÖVP). ÖVP politician Josef Klaus (1910-2001), later chancellor of Austria, served as governor of Salzburg from 1949 till 1961. In 2004 Gabi Burgstaller became the first Social Democratic (and first female) governor of Salzburg.

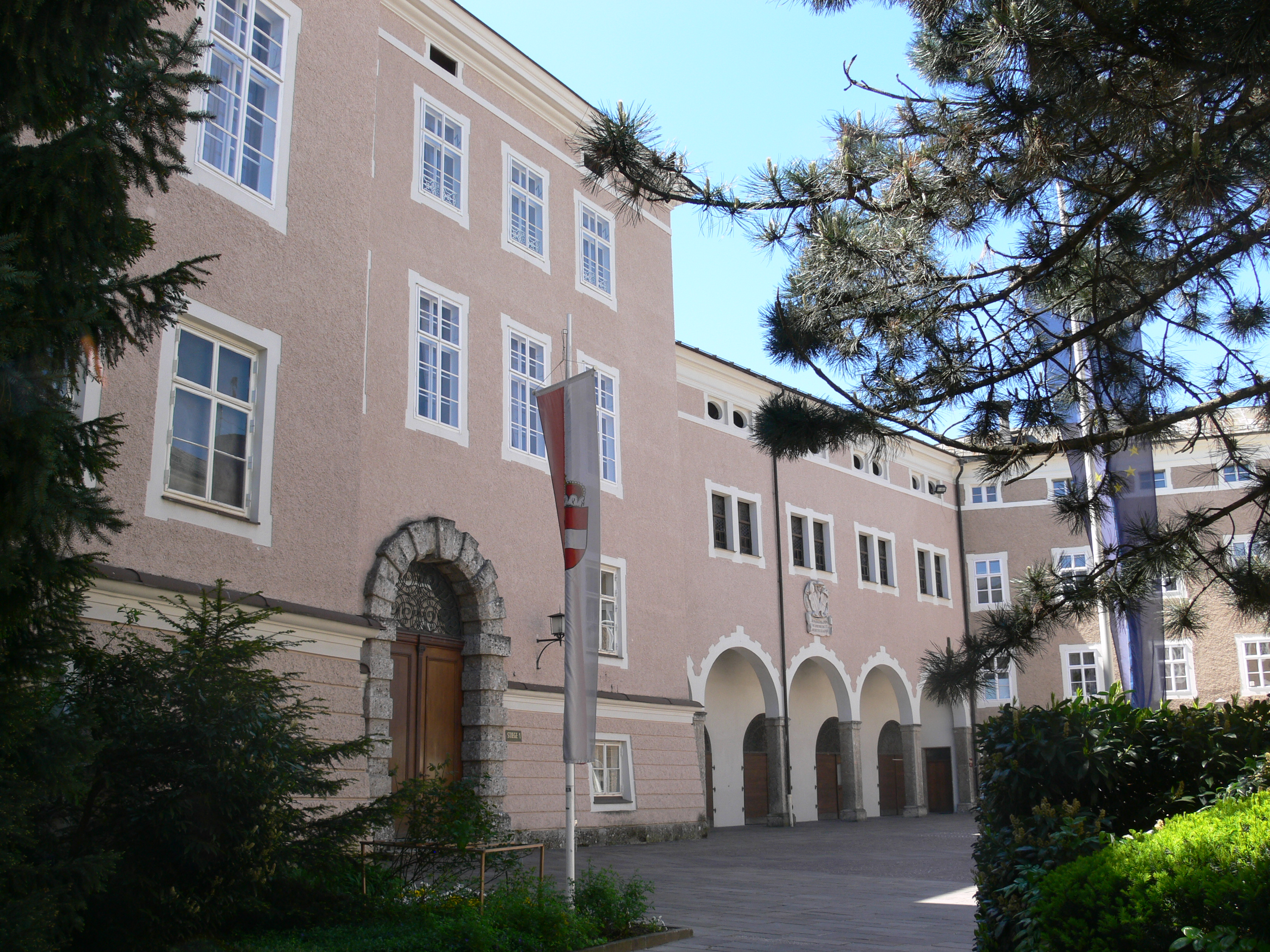
Chiemseehof, seat of Salzburg's provincial parliament

The last results, in April 2023 (Compared to 2018) were:

Party	Votes in %	Change	Seats	Change
Austrian People's Party (ÖVP)	30.37%	▼7.4%	12	▼3
Freedom Party of Austria (FPÖ)	25.75%	▲6.9%	10	▲3
Social Democratic Party of Austria (SPÖ)	17.87%	▼2.1%	7	▼1
Communist Party of Austria (KPÖ)	11.66%	▲11.3%	4	▲4
The Greens – The Green Alternative (GRÜNE)	8.20%	▼1.1%	3	-
NEOS – The New Austria and Liberal Forum (NEOS)	4.20%	▼3.1%	0	▼3
We are Salzburg (WIRS)	1.19%	▲1.2%	0	New
MFG Austria - People, Freedom, Fundamental Rights (MFG)	0.77%	▲0.8%	0	New

The current governor of Salzburg, Wilfried Haslauer (ÖVP), entered into coalition discussions with the FPÖ, after his proposition of a ÖVP-FPÖ-SPÖ coalition was rejected by the Social Democrats. Haslauer said "I regret that we could not implement the Alliance for Salzburg". After successful coalition negotiations, the ÖVP and the FPÖ entered into a governing coalition with Haslauer as the Governor and Marlene Svazek as the First Deputy Governor. Salzburg State has joined Lower Austria and Upper Austria as the third black-blue coalition provincial government. The ÖVP has four seats in the government, while the FPÖ has three. The current president (speaker) of the Salzburg federal state parliament is Brigitta Pallauf.

=== Government ===
Government ministers and their portfolios from the 2023 Salzburg state election.

==== Governor Wilfried Haslauer (ÖVP) ====
- State Direction
- Finance and Asset Management
- Security
- Disaster Prevention
- Museums
- Research and Science
- European Affairs

==== 1st Deputy Marlene Svazek (FPÖ) ====
- Nature and Environment Protection
- Business
- Early and Primary Education
- Hunting and Fishing
- Youth
- Families
- Integration
- Generations

==== 2nd Deputy Stefan Schnöll (ÖVP) ====
- Economy and Tourism
- Communities
- Employment and Labour Market
- Infrastructure and Traffic
- Culture

==== Members of the provincial government ====
- Josef Schwaiger (ÖVP): Agriculture, Personnel Management, Water, National Parks, Energy, Asylum Seekers
- Daniela Gutschi (ÖVP): Education, Health, Women and Diversity
- Christian Pewny (FPÖ): Social Services, Food, Consumer Protection, Regional Development, Apprenticeships
- Martin Zauner (FPÖ): Spatial Planning, Living, Sport, Basic Traffic

== Administrative divisions ==
=== Districts ===
Salzburg State comprises six districts, known as Bezirke or vernacularly Gaue:

- Hallein District (Tennengau region)
- St. Johann im Pongau District (Pongau region)
- Salzburg-Umgebung District (Salzburg environs) (Flachgau region)
- Tamsweg District (Lungau region)
- Zell am See District (Pinzgau region)

Salzburg city is its own administrative district.

=== Municipalities ===
The federal state is divided into 119 municipalities, including Salzburg City. 11 of them have city status (Städte), 25 are market towns (Marktgemeinden) and the other 83 are simple municipalities (Gemeinden). Below is a list of all the municipalities divided by district:

- Hallein District (Tennengau) (13 municipalities): Abtenau, Adnet, Annaberg-Lungötz, Bad Vigaun, Golling an der Salzach, Hallein, Krispl, Kuchl, Oberalm, Puch bei Hallein, Rußbach am Paß Gschütt, St. Koloman, Scheffau am Tennengebirge.
- Salzburg-Umgebung District (Flachgau) (37 municipalities): Anif, Anthering, Bergheim, Berndorf bei Salzburg, Bürmoos, Dorfbeuern, Ebenau, Elixhausen, Elsbethen, Eugendorf, Faistenau, Fuschl am See, Großgmain, Göming, Grödig, Hallwang, Henndorf am Wallersee, Hintersee, Hof bei Salzburg, Koppl, Köstendorf, Lamprechtshausen, Mattsee, Neumarkt am Wallersee, Nußdorf am Haunsberg, Oberndorf bei Salzburg, Obertrum, Plainfeld, St. Georgen bei Salzburg, St. Gilgen, Schleedorf, Seeham, Seekirchen am Wallersee, Straßwalchen, Strobl, Thalgau, Wals-Siezenheim.
- St. Johann im Pongau District (Pongau) (25 municipalities): Altenmarkt im Pongau, Bad Gastein, Bad Hofgastein, Bischofshofen, Dorfgastein, Eben im Pongau, Filzmoos, Flachau, Forstau, Goldegg, Grossarl, Hüttau, Hüttschlag, Kleinarl, Mühlbach am Hochkönig, Pfarrwerfen, Radstadt, St. Johann im Pongau, St. Martin am Tennengebirge, St. Veit im Pongau, Schwarzach im Pongau, Untertauern, Wagrain, Werfen, Werfenweng.
- Tamsweg District (Lungau) (15 municipalities): Göriach, Lessach, Mariapfarr, Mauterndorf, Muhr, Ramingstein, St. Andrä im Lungau, St. Margarethen im Lungau, St. Michael im Lungau, Tamsweg, Thomatal, Tweng, Unternberg, Weißpriach, Zederhaus.
- Zell am See District (Pinzgau) (28 municipalities): Bramberg am Wildkogel, Bruck an der Großglocknerstraße, Dienten am Hochkönig, Fusch an der Großglocknerstraße, Hollersbach im Pinzgau, Kaprun, Krimml, Lend, Leogang, Lofer, Maishofen, Maria Alm, Mittersill, Neukirchen am Großvenediger, Niedernsill, Piesendorf, Rauris, Saalbach-Hinterglemm, Saalfelden, St. Martin bei Lofer, Stuhlfelden, Taxenbach, Unken, Uttendorf, Viehhofen, Wald im Pinzgau, Weißbach bei Lofer, Zell am See.

== Economy ==
The federal state's gross domestic product (GDP) was 29 billion € in 2018, accounting for 7.5% of the Austria's economic output. GDP per capita adjusted for purchasing power was 46,500 € or 154% of the EU27 average in the same year. Salzburg is the federal state with the highest GDP per capita in Austria before Vienna.

== Infrastructure ==
The state is located in the area of the transport association Salzburger Verkehrsverbund (SVV).

== Architecture ==
The Salzburg Cathedral was the first Baroque building in the German-speaking artistic world. Two other important buildings initiated by the Salzburg archbishops were Hohenwerfen Castle and Hohensalzburg Fortress. The first Archbishop of Salzburg was Arno of Salzburg (785–821), in whose honor the world-famous hiking circuit — the Arnoweg — is named.

The predominant stylistic elements of Salzburg's architecture have their origins in the Baroque and the Rococo periods.

Salzburg City's historic centre was named by UNESCO as a World Heritage Site.

== Language ==
The official working language is Austrian German, and it can be heard especially in the cities and formal contexts. The vernacular language, typically spoken in informal settings and rural areas in Salzburg, is Bavarian.

== Visitors' attractions ==
- Eisriesenwelt: the largest ice cave in the world
- Großglockner Hochalpenstraße: a panoramic road, called Grossglockner High Alpine Road
- Salzkammergut: a lake district situated in Salzburg State, Upper Austria and Styria
- Liechtensteinklamm: Salzburg is home to one of the longest and deepest gorges of the Alps, the Liechtensteinklamm. It is located near Sankt Johann im Pongau or St.Johann/Pg., a small town in the centre of the federal state.
- Nonnberg Abbey: a Benedictine monastery that was immortalized in the movie The Sound of Music

== Sports ==
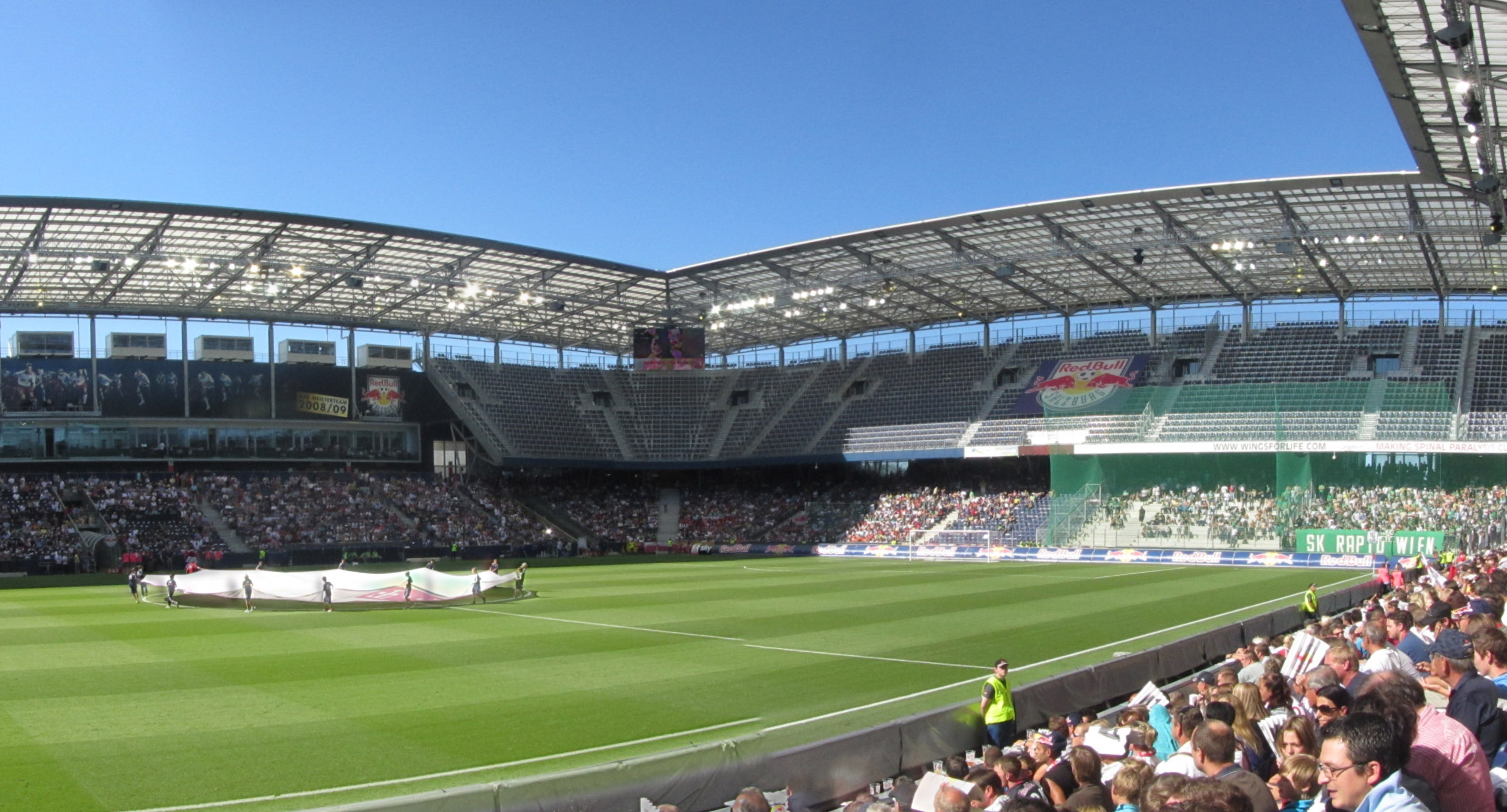
Stadion Wals-Siezenheim

- Salzburgring, a permanent racing circuit, north east of the city of Salzburg
- Ski Amadé
- Kitzsteinhorn, skiing the year round on a glacier
- Icespeedway in St. Johann im Pongau
- Aperschnalzen, an old tradition of competitive whipcracking

=== Ski resorts ===
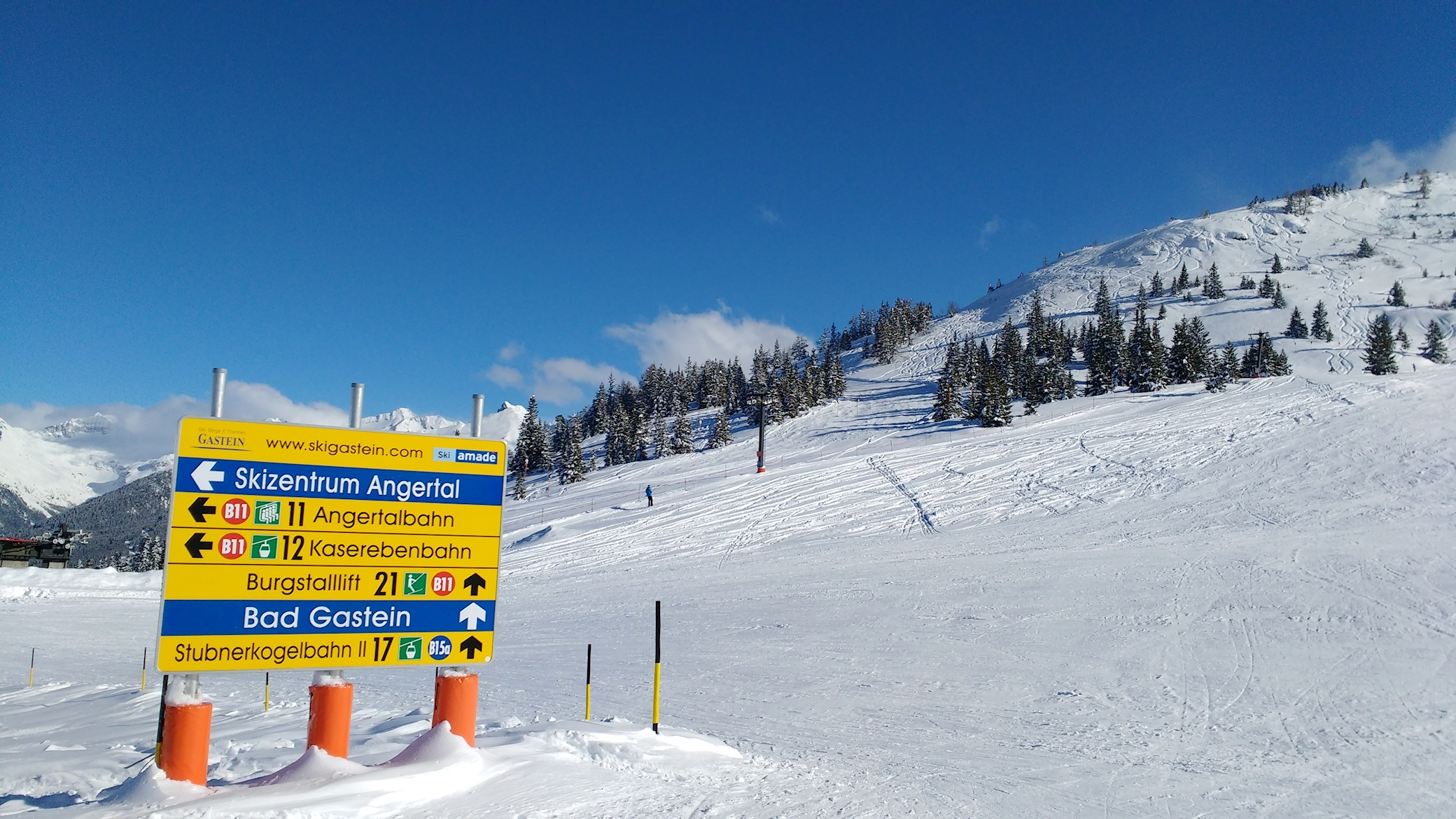
Ski run in Gastein Valley resort

Altenmarkt im Pongau, Flachau, Wagrain, St. Johann, Zell am See (Saalbach-Hinterglemm), Obertauern, Bad Gastein, Rauris, Lofer, Hochkönig, Krispl

== Assorted statistics ==
- Tourist Regions: 21
- Resort Towns: 115
- Guest Beds: 192,000
- Lakes: 185
- Biggest lake: Wolfgangsee
- Longest river: Salzach
- Highest mountain: Großvenediger — elevation 3,666 m (12,028 ft)
- Hiking paths: 7,200 km (4,500 mi)
- Hill farms: 1,800 — 550 of them serving refreshments
- National parks: 1
- Marked cycle paths: 2,000 km (1,200 mi)
- Mountainbike trails (including cross-border routes): 3,000 km (1,900 mi)
- Golf courses: 13
- Ski slopes: 1,700 km (1,100 mi)
- Cross-country ski trails: 2,220 km (1,380 mi)
- Night slopes: 14
- Winter hiking paths: 2,500 km (1,600 mi)
