= Taxenbach =

Town in Salzburg, Austria

- Municipality
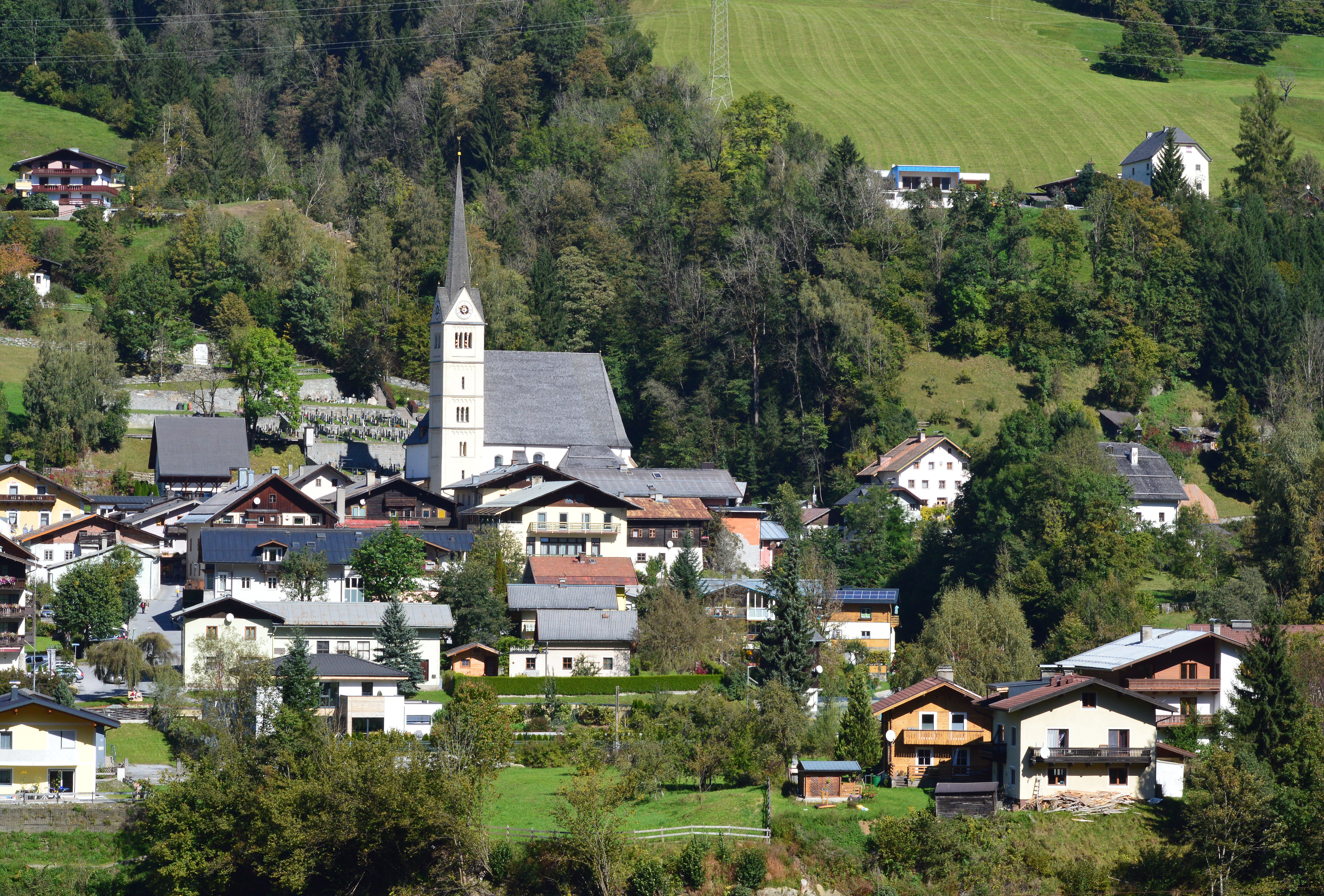
- View of Taxenbach

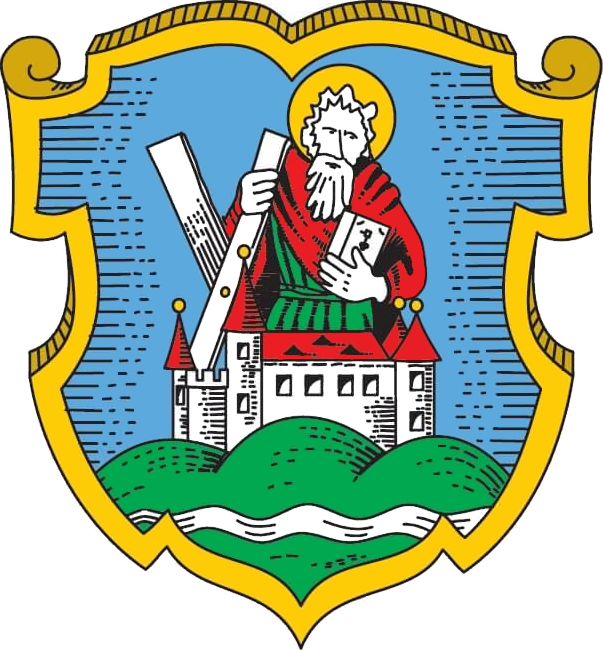
- Coat of arms

- Location within Austria
- Coordinates: 47°17′30″N 12°57′51″E
- Country: Austria
- State: Salzburg
- District: Zell am See

Government
  - Mayor: Johann Gassner (ÖVP)

Area
  - Total: 88.24 km^{2} (34.07 sq mi)
- Elevation: 776 m (2,546 ft)

Population (2018-01-01)
  - Total: 2,747
  - Density: 31.13/km^{2} (80.63/sq mi)
- Time zone: UTC+1 (CET)
  - Summer (DST): UTC+2 (CEST)
- Postal code: 5660
- Area code: 06543
- Vehicle registration: ZE
- Website: www.taxenbach.at

Taxenbach is a market town in the district of Zell am See (Pinzgau region), in the state of Salzburg in Austria.

== Population ==
Historical population
Year	Pop.	±%
1869	1,716	—
1880	1,820	+6.1%
1890	1,936	+6.4%
1900	2,107	+8.8%
1910	2,164	+2.7%
1923	2,203	+1.8%
1934	2,410	+9.4%
1939	2,357	−2.2%
1951	2,579	+9.4%
1961	2,715	+5.3%
1971	2,817	+3.8%
1981	2,983	+5.9%
1991	2,966	−0.6%
2001	2,918	−1.6%
2011	2,783	−4.6%
