= Weißbach bei Lofer =

- Municipality
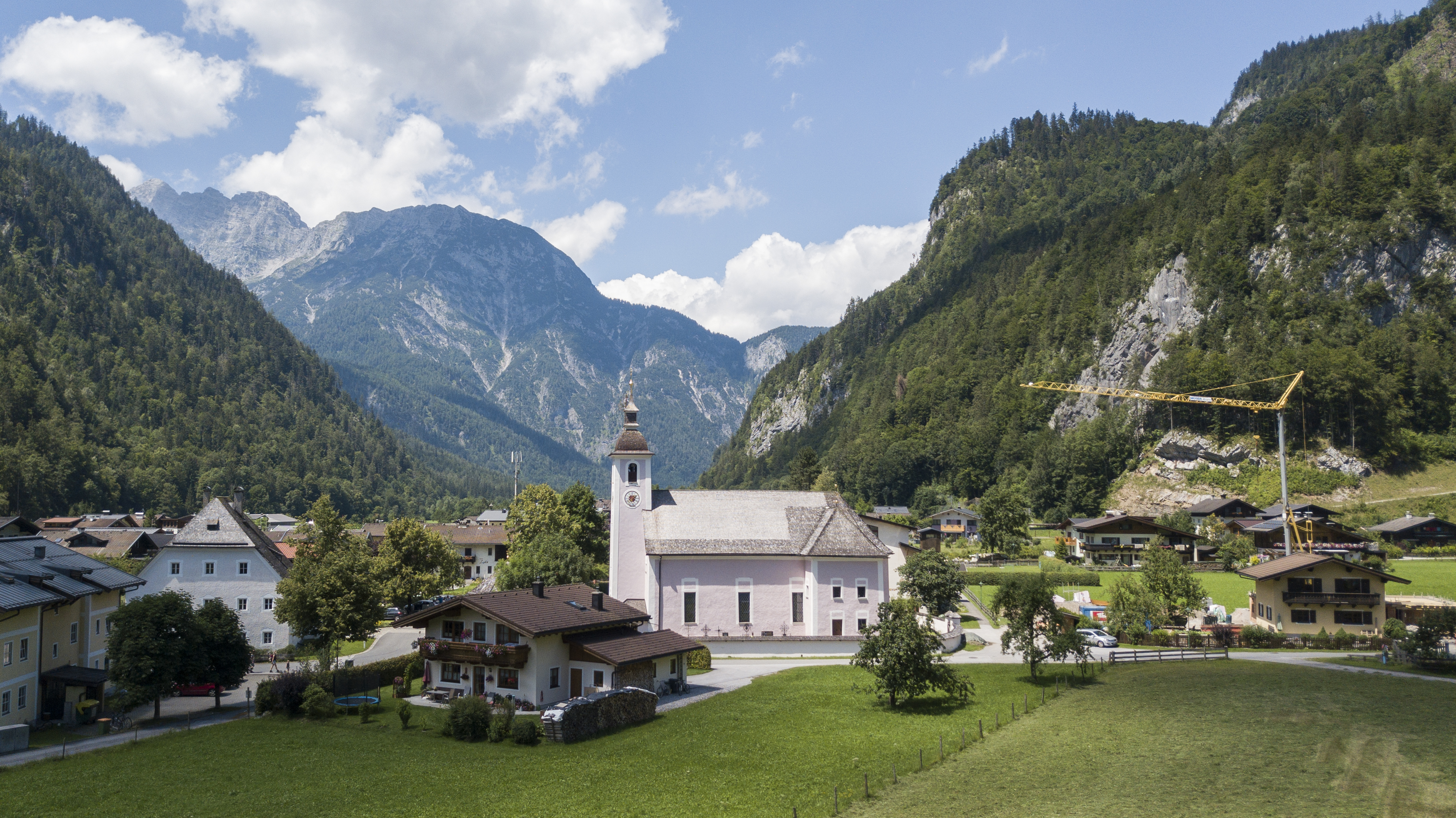

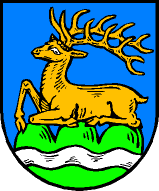
- Coat of arms

- Location within Austria
- Coordinates: 47°31′00″N 12°45′00″E
- Country: Austria
- State: Salzburg
- District: Zell am See

Government
  - Mayor: Josef Michael Hohenwarter (ÖVP)

Area
  - Total: 69.59 km^{2} (26.87 sq mi)
- Elevation: 666 m (2,185 ft)

Population (2018-01-01)
  - Total: 429
  - Density: 6.16/km^{2} (16.0/sq mi)
- Time zone: UTC+1 (CET)
  - Summer (DST): UTC+2 (CEST)
- Postal code: 5093
- Area code: 06582
- Vehicle registration: ZE
- Website: www.weissbach.at

Weißbach bei Lofer (German pronunciation: [ˈvaɪsbax baɪ ˈloːfɐ], lit. 'Weißbach near Lofer') is a municipality in the district of Zell am See (Pinzgau region), in the state of Salzburg in Austria.

== Population ==
Historical population
Year	Pop.	±%
1869	227	—
1880	248	+9.3%
1890	266	+7.3%
1900	305	+14.7%
1910	315	+3.3%
1923	329	+4.4%
1934	327	−0.6%
1939	357	+9.2%
1951	404	+13.2%
1961	432	+6.9%
1971	441	+2.1%
1981	422	−4.3%
1991	391	−7.3%
2001	406	+3.8%
2011	427	+5.2%
