= Maishofen =

- Municipality
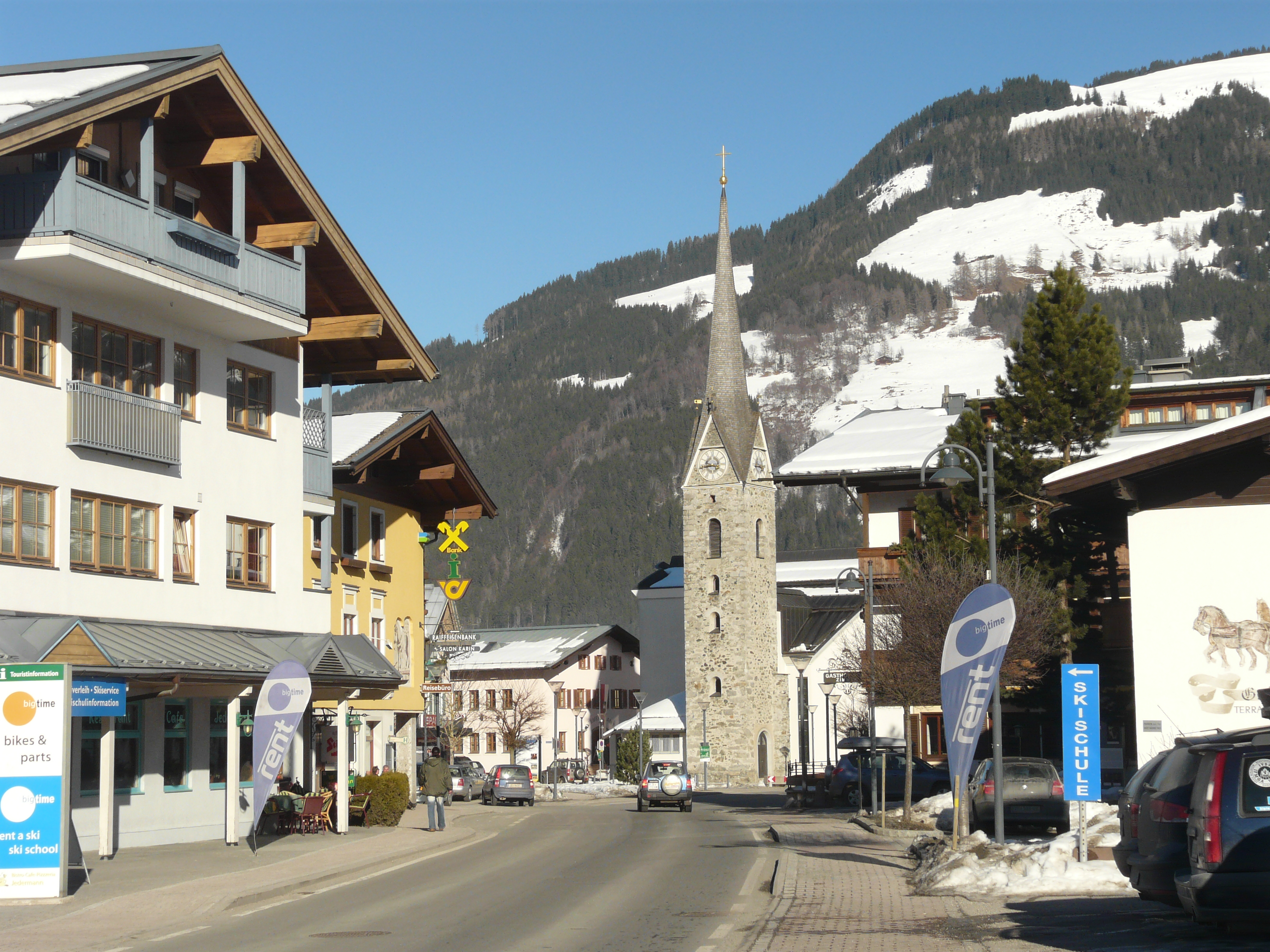
- Centre of Maishofen

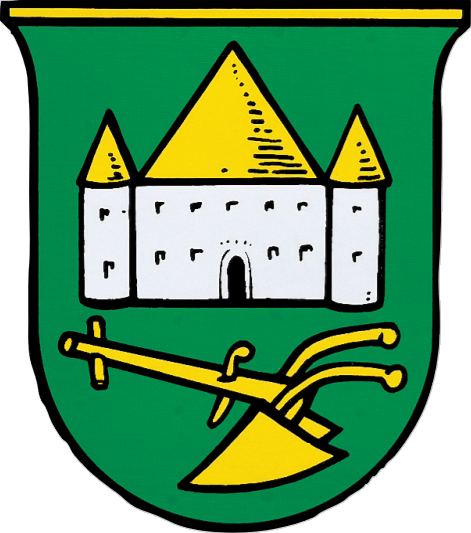
- Coat of arms

- Location within Austria
- Coordinates: 47°21′00″N 12°48′00″E
- Country: Austria
- State: Salzburg
- District: Zell am See

Government
  - Mayor: Stefan Aglassinger (ÖVP)

Area
  - Total: 29.54 km^{2} (11.41 sq mi)
- Elevation: 768 m (2,520 ft)

Population (2018-01-01)
  - Total: 3,601
  - Density: 121.9/km^{2} (315.7/sq mi)
- Time zone: UTC+1 (CET)
  - Summer (DST): UTC+2 (CEST)
- Postal code: 5751
- Area code: 06542
- Vehicle registration: ZE
- Website: www.maishofen.at

Maishofen is a municipality in the district of Zell am See (Pinzgau region), in the state of Salzburg in Austria.

== Population ==
Historical population
Year	Pop.	±%
1869	968	—
1880	1,023	+5.7%
1890	1,016	−0.7%
1900	1,105	+8.8%
1910	1,262	+14.2%
1923	1,268	+0.5%
1934	1,421	+12.1%
1939	1,459	+2.7%
1951	1,672	+14.6%
1961	1,664	−0.5%
1971	1,999	+20.1%
1981	2,288	+14.5%
1991	2,543	+11.1%
2001	3,026	+19.0%
2011	3,269	+8.0%
