= Salzburger Seengebiet =

Coordinates: 47°57′0″N 13°9′0″E

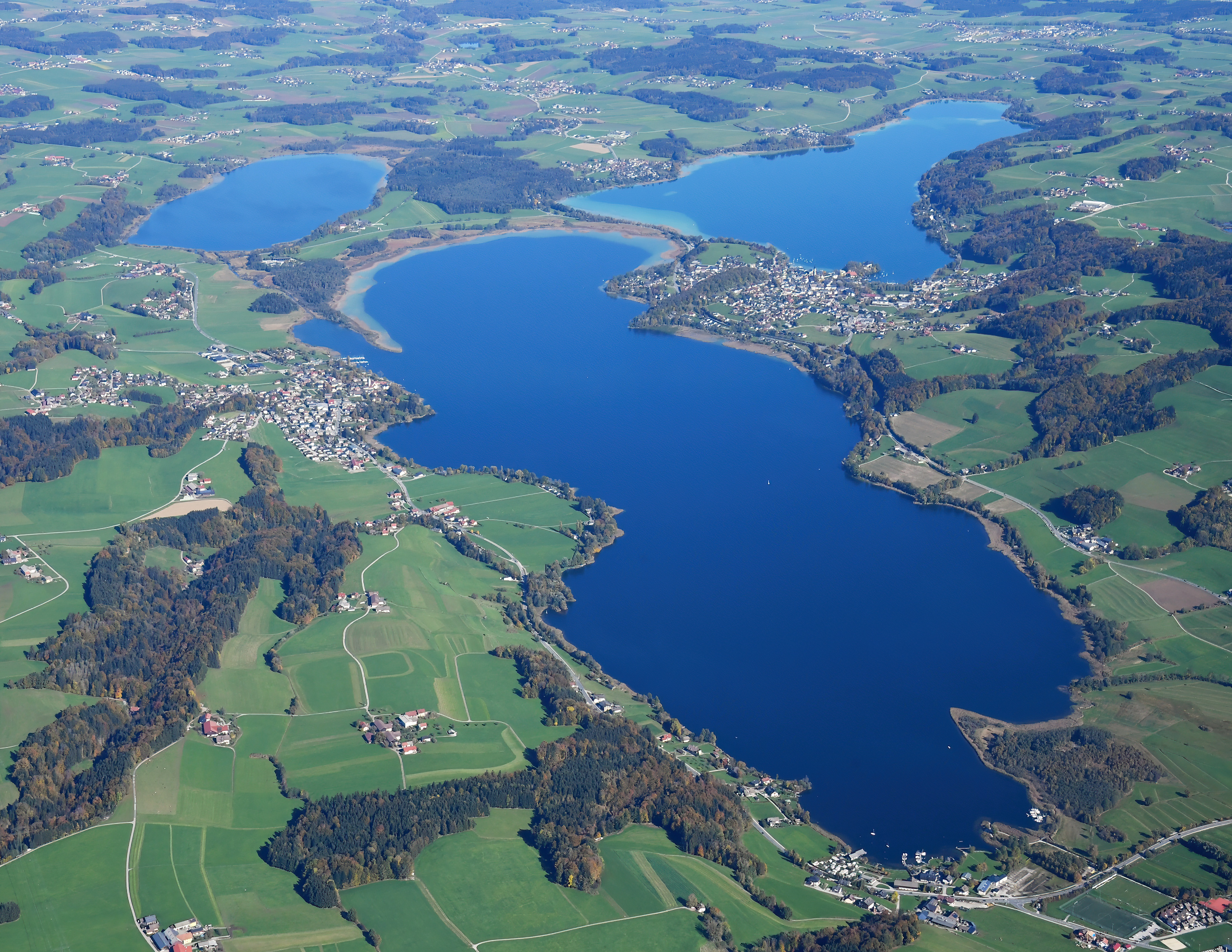
Aerial view of the Trumer Seen from the southwest

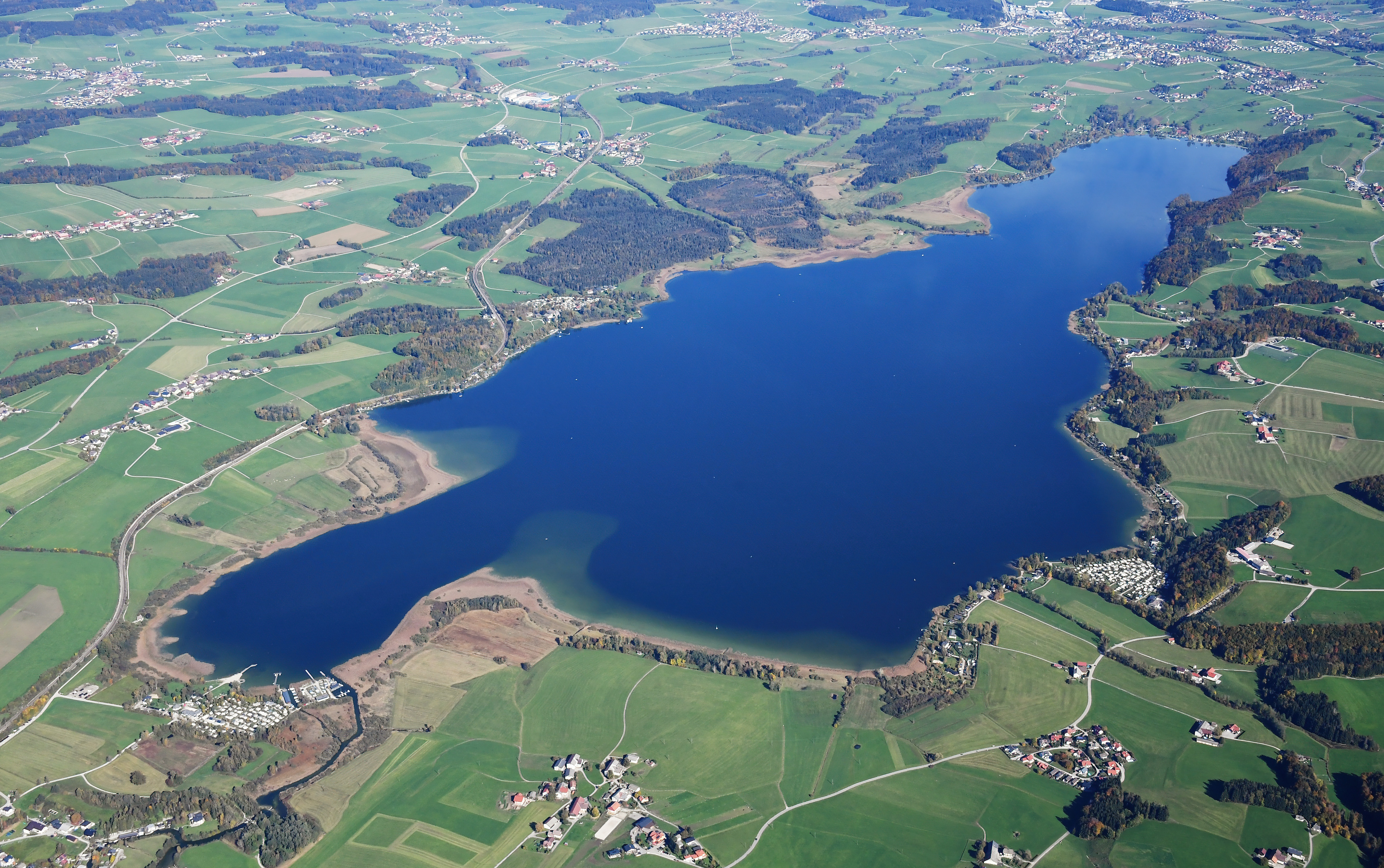
Aerial view of the Wallersee from the southwest

Das Salzburger Seengebiet or Salzburger Seenland is a group of natural lakes northeasterly of the city of Salzburg in Salzburg-Umgebung District (Region Flachgau) and is part of Salzburg alpine foothills.

== List of lakes ==
- Wallersee
- Trumer Seen, consisting of
  - Obertrumer See
  - Mattsee (a.k.a. „Niedertrumer See“) and
  - Grabensee
- Egelseen (3)

== List of municipalities in this area ==

- Berndorf bei Salzburg
- Henndorf am Wallersee
- Köstendorf
- Mattsee
- Neumarkt am Wallersee
- Obertrum am See
- Schleedorf
- Seeham
- Seekirchen am Wallersee
- Straßwalchen
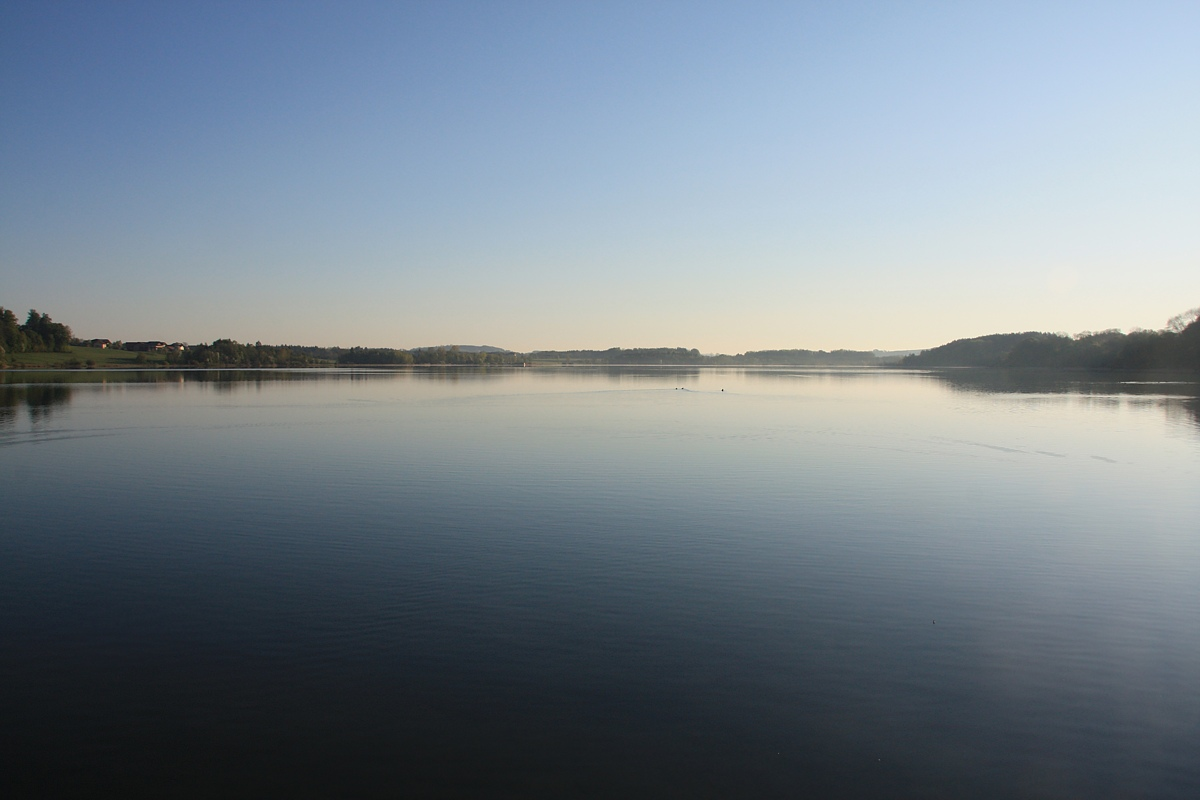
Grabensee

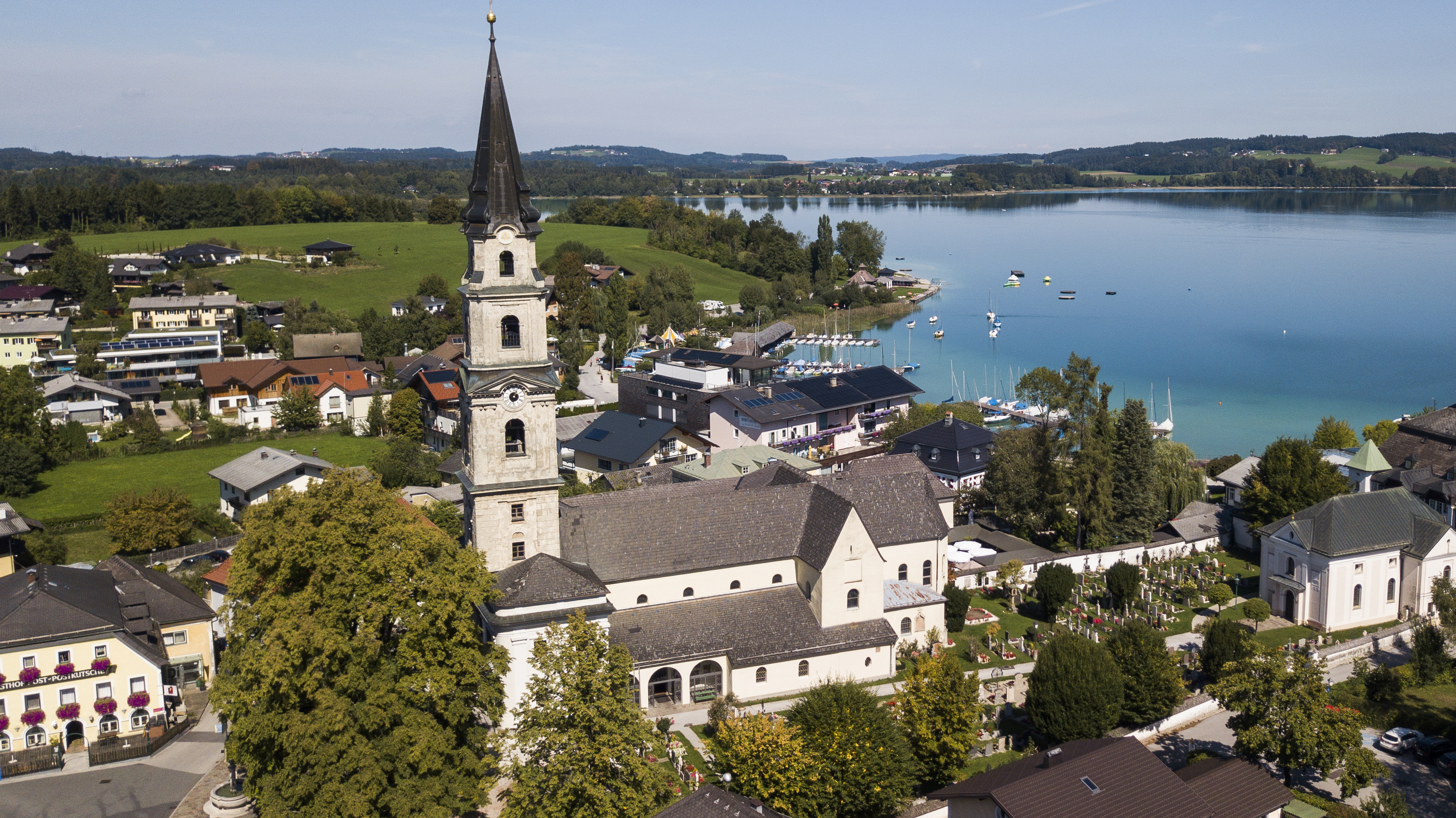
Mattsee (village) and Mattsee (lake)

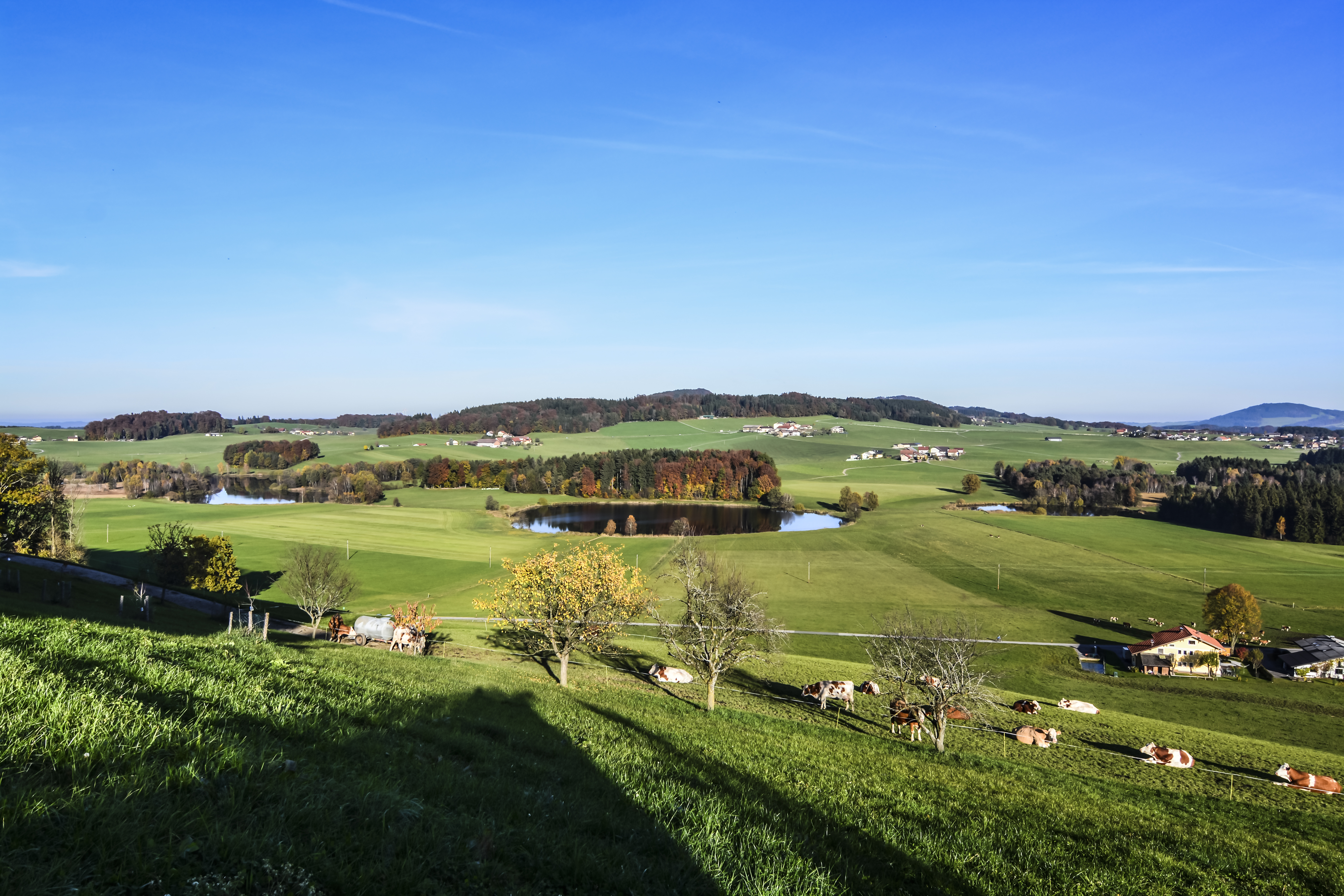
Egelseen

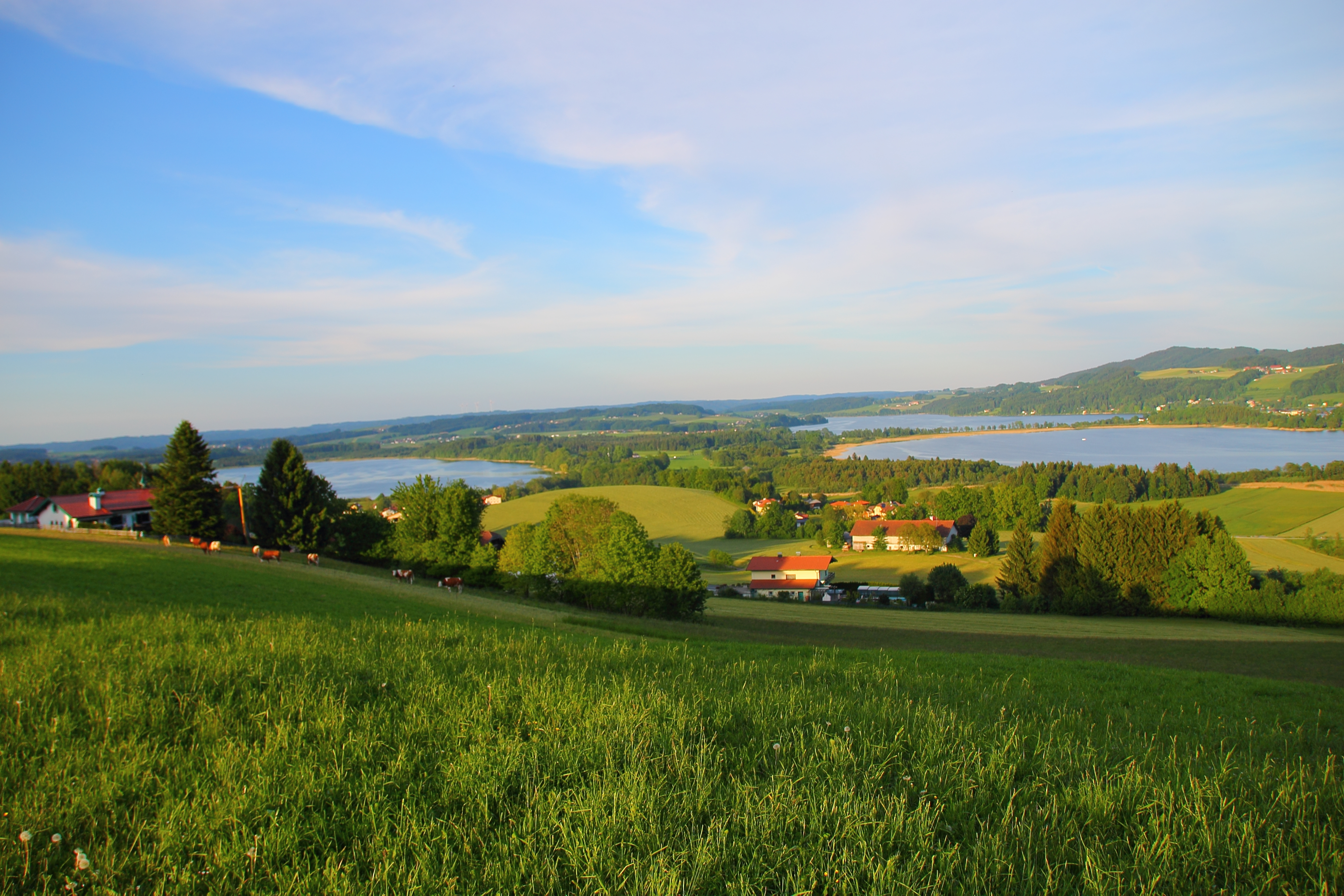
Obertrumer Seen as seen from Aining

== See also ==
- List of lakes of Austria
- Salzkammergut
