= Seekirchen am Wallersee =

- Municipality
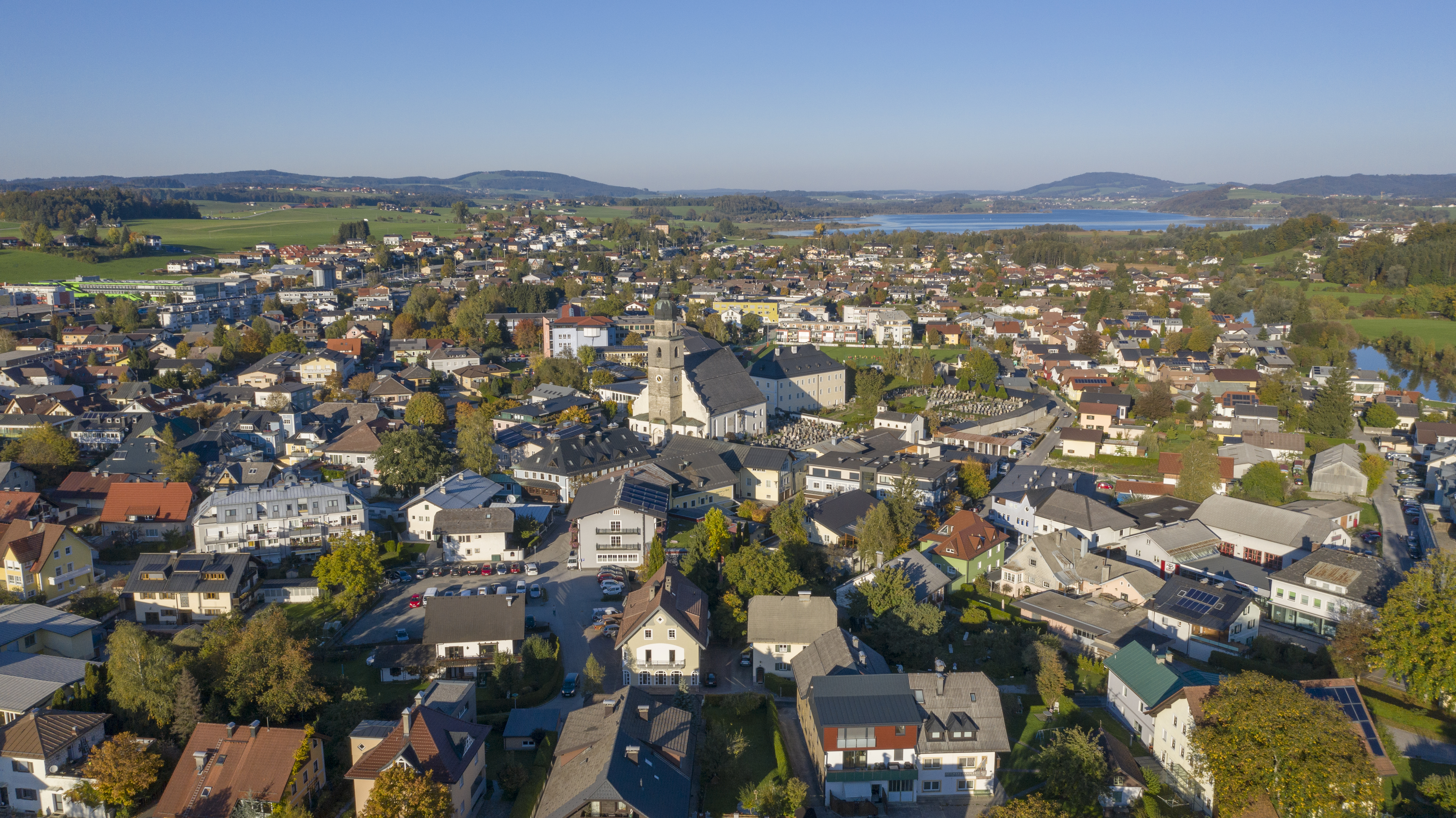

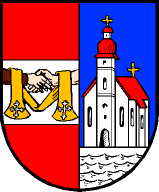
- Coat of arms

- Location within Austria
- Coordinates: 47°54′00″N 13°08′00″E
- Country: Austria
- State: Salzburg
- District: Salzburg-Umgebung

Government
  - Mayor: Konrad Pieringer (ÖVP)

Area
  - Total: 50.28 km^{2} (19.41 sq mi)
- Elevation: 512 m (1,680 ft)

Population (2018-01-01)
  - Total: 10,764
  - Density: 214.1/km^{2} (554.5/sq mi)
- Time zone: UTC+1 (CET)
  - Summer (DST): UTC+2 (CEST)
- Postal code: 5201
- Area code: 06212
- Vehicle registration: SL
- Website: www.seekirchen.at

Seekirchen am Wallersee (simply known as Seekirchen) is a town in the district of Salzburg-Umgebung in the state of Salzburg in Austria.

== History ==
The territory was settled 5,000 years ago and is the oldest Austrian settlement that still exists today. Today it has more than 10,000 inhabitants (because of that, it's officially called a "city").

== Geography ==
Seekirchen is part of the legal district Neumarkt bei Salzburg. It borders on the neighboring towns of Anthering, Elixhausen, Eugendorf, Hallwang, Henndorf am Wallersee, Köstendorf, Mattsee, Obertrum am See and Schleedorf.

The Austrian land register subdivides Seekirchen into districts, some of which are cadastral municipalities:

- Bayerham
- Brunn
- Fischtaging
- Halberstätten
- Huttich
- Kothgumprechting
- Kraiham
- Mayerlehen
- Marschalln (cadastral municipality)
- Mödlham (cadastral municipality)
- Ried
- Schmieding
- Schmiedkeller
- Schöngumprechting
- Seekirchen Land (cadastral municipality)
- Seekirchen Markt (cadastral municipality)
- Seewalchen (cadastral municipality)
- Waldprechting (cadastral municipality)
- Wies
- Wimm
- Wimmsiedlung
- Zaisberg

== Transportation ==
The city is 15 km distanced from Salzburg and is served by a railway line (2nd station "Seekirchen-Süd" planned in 2030) also included in the Salzburg S-Bahn

== See also ==
- Wallersee
- Salzburgerland

== Sons and daughters ==
- Andreas Ibertsberger (born 1982), football player
- Thomas Winklhofer (born 1970), football player and UEFA Cup finalist

== Connected to the town ==
- Robert Ibertsberger (born 1977 in Neumarkt), football player; grew up in Seekirchen
- Manfred Pamminger (born 1977 in Salzburg), footballer; grew up in Seekirchen
- Sebastian Gishamer (born 1988 in Salzburg region), a UEFA football referee; lives in Seekirchen
