= Plainfeld =

- Municipality
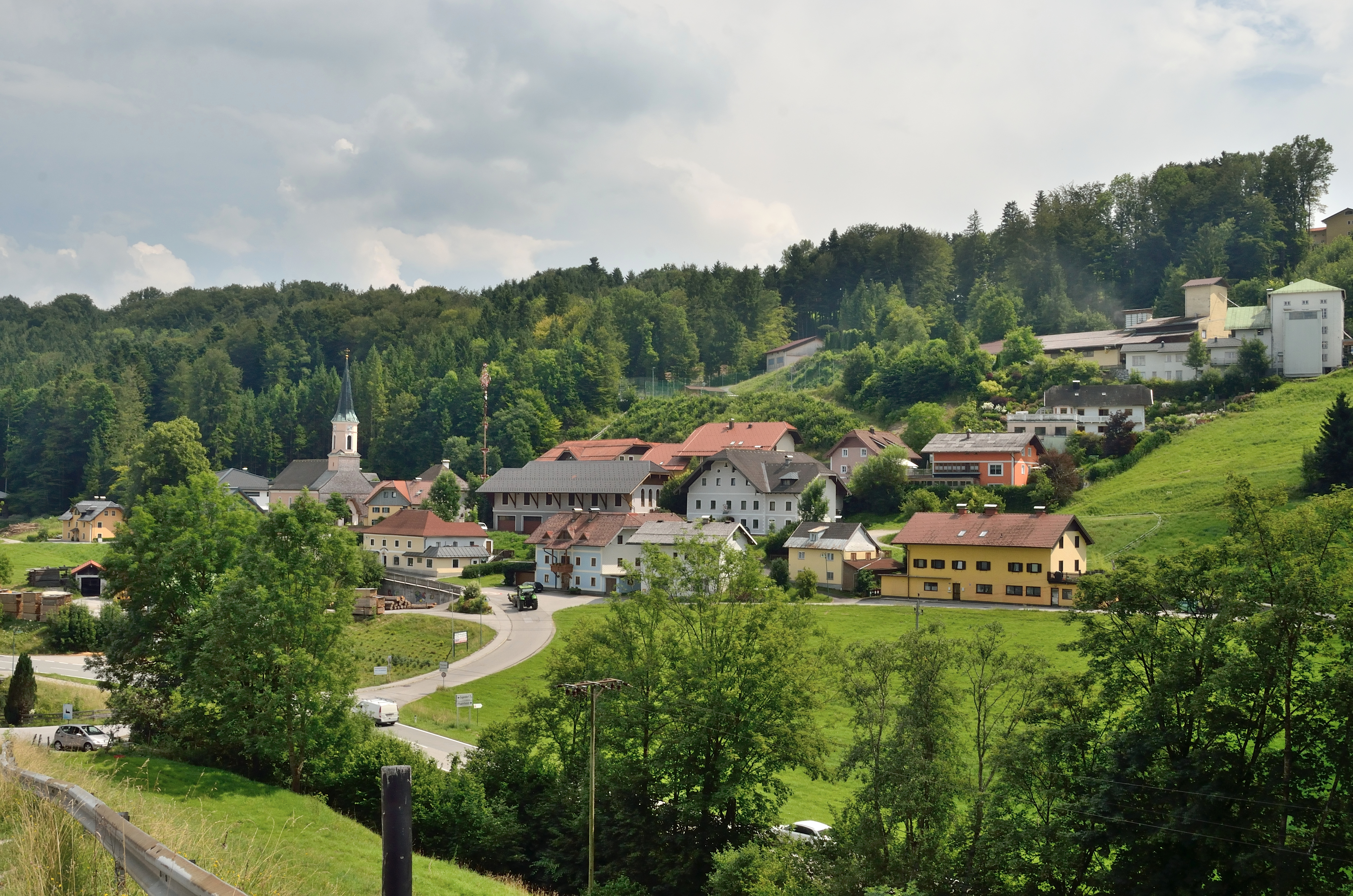
- View of Plainfeld

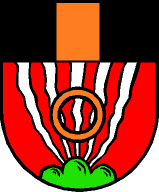
- Coat of arms

- Location within Austria
- Coordinates: 47°50′00″N 13°11′00″E
- Country: Austria
- State: Salzburg
- District: Salzburg-Umgebung

Government
  - Mayor: Leonhard Wörndl-Aichriedler (ÖVP)

Area
  - Total: 5.21 km^{2} (2.01 sq mi)
- Elevation: 629 m (2,064 ft)

Population (2018-01-01)
  - Total: 1,237
  - Density: 237/km^{2} (615/sq mi)
- Time zone: UTC+1 (CET)
  - Summer (DST): UTC+2 (CEST)
- Postal code: 5325
- Area code: 06229
- Vehicle registration: SL
- Website: www.plainfeld.salzburg.at

Plainfeld is a municipality in the district of Salzburg-Umgebung in the state of Salzburg in Austria.

== Geography ==
Plainfeld lies in the Flachgau 12 km east of the city of Salzburg.

The neighboring municipalities are Eugendorf, Hof bei Salzburg, Thalgau, and Koppl.
