= Göming =

- Municipality
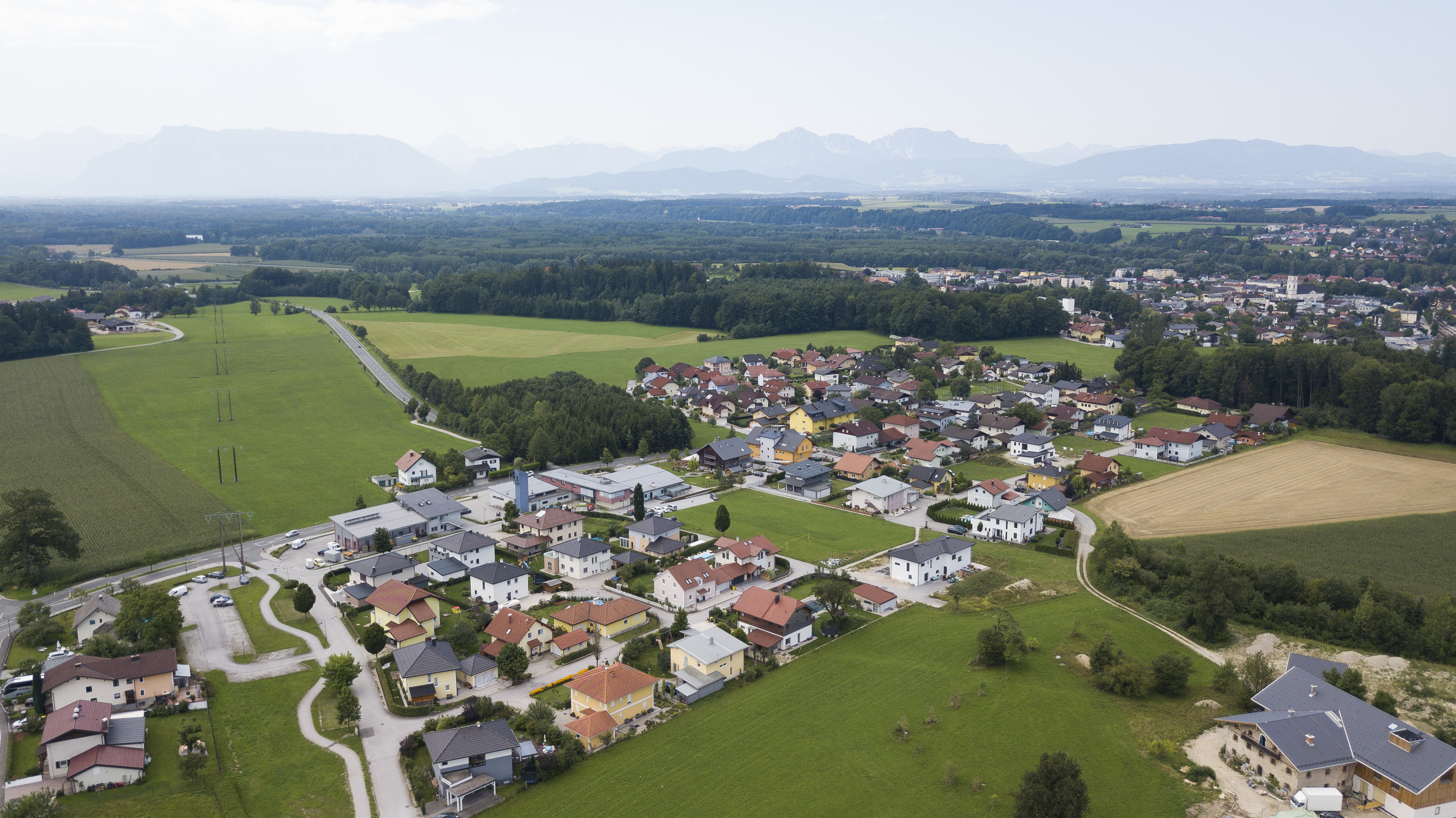
- Aerial view of Göming

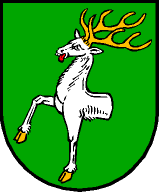
- Coat of arms

- Location within Austria
- Coordinates: 47°57′00″N 12°57′00″E
- Country: Austria
- State: Salzburg
- District: Salzburg-Umgebung

Government
  - Mayor: Rudolf Felber (ÖVP)

Area
  - Total: 8.75 km^{2} (3.38 sq mi)
- Elevation: 530 m (1,740 ft)

Population (2018-01-01)
  - Total: 764
  - Density: 87.3/km^{2} (226/sq mi)
- Time zone: UTC+1 (CET)
  - Summer (DST): UTC+2 (CEST)
- Postal code: 5114
- Area code: 06272
- Vehicle registration: SL
- Website: www.goeming.at

Göming is a municipality in the district of Salzburg-Umgebung in the state of Salzburg in Austria.

== Geography ==
Göming lies in the northern part of the Flachgau east of Oberndorf bei Salzburg. Other neighboring municipalities are Lamprechtshausen on the north and Nußdorf am Haunsberg on the east and south.
