= Henndorf am Wallersee =

Place in Salzburg, Austria

- Municipality
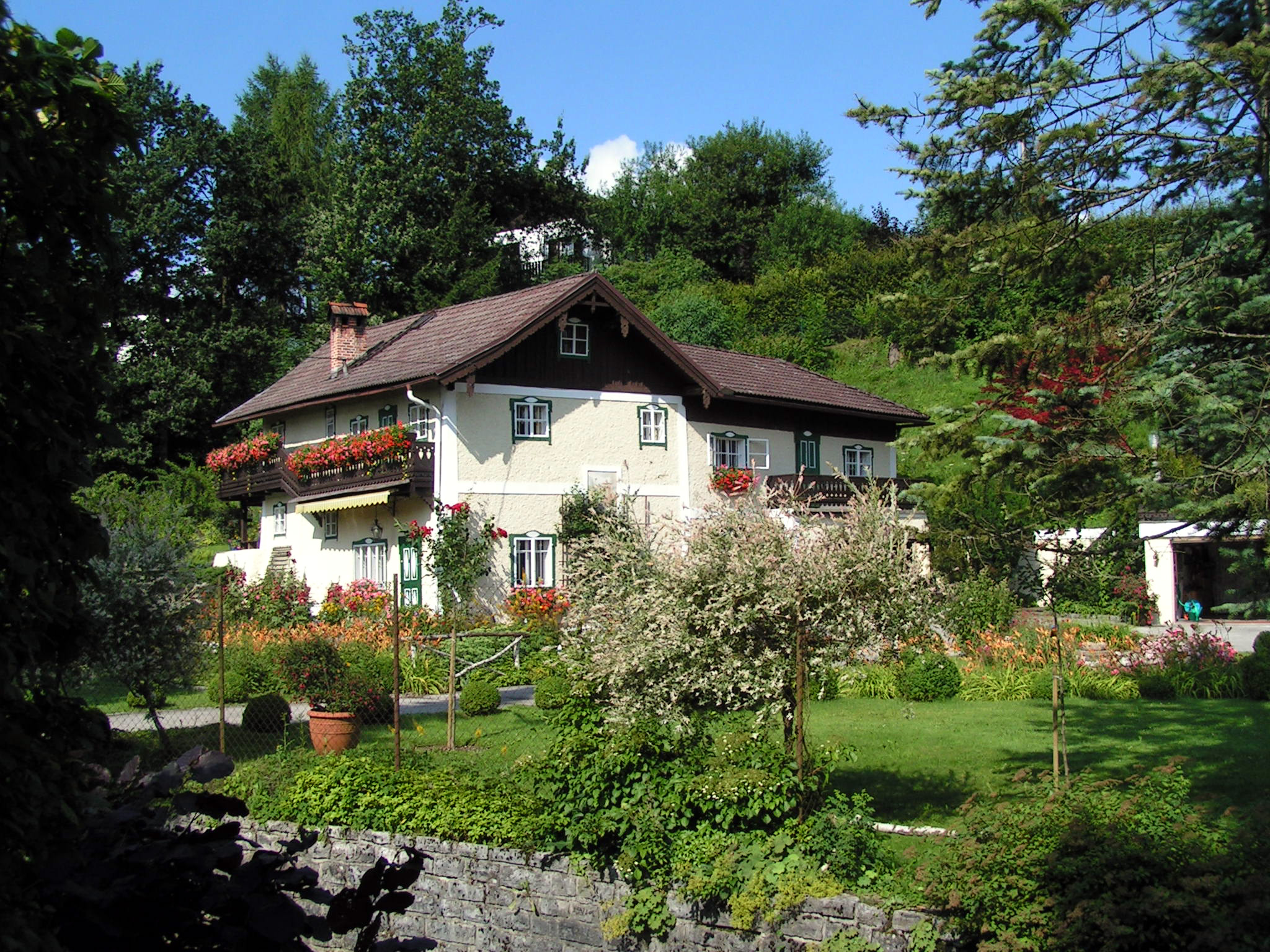

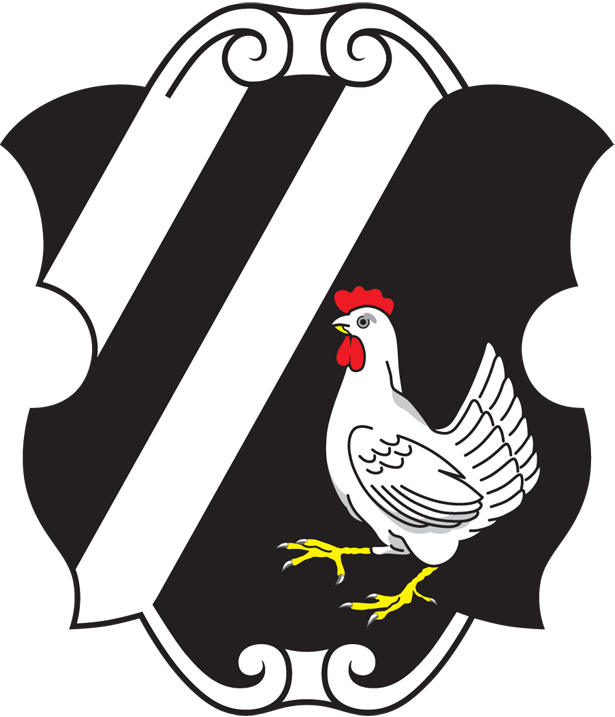
- Coat of arms

- Location within Austria
- Coordinates: 47°53′00″N 13°10′00″E
- Country: Austria
- State: Salzburg
- District: Salzburg-Umgebung

Government
  - Mayor: Rupert Eder (ÖVP)

Area
  - Total: 23.5 km^{2} (9.1 sq mi)
- Elevation: 551 m (1,808 ft)

Population (2018-01-01)
  - Total: 4,947
  - Density: 211/km^{2} (545/sq mi)
- Time zone: UTC+1 (CET)
  - Summer (DST): UTC+2 (CEST)
- Postal code: 5302
- Area code: 06214
- Vehicle registration: SL
- Website: Official website

Henndorf am Wallersee, commonly named Henndorf, is a municipality of 5,025 inhabitants in the district of Salzburg-Umgebung in the state of Salzburg in Austria.

== History ==
The town was first mentioned in 6th century.

== Geography ==
Henndorf is located around 16 kilometres to the north-east of Salzburg, by the Wallersee lake. The municipality borders with Eugendorf, Neumarkt am Wallersee, Seekirchen am Wallersee, Köstendorf and Thalgau. It is divided into 9 Katastralgemeinden: the town of Henndorf and 8 villages:

Village	Population (2001)
Henndorf am Wallersee	3,742
Berg	209
Enzing	58
Fenning	190
Hankham	86
Hatting	16
Hof	152
Oelling	127
Wankham	67

== Personalities ==
- Peter Machreich (1954–),

Austrian writer, raised nine children, was born in Henndorf

- Carl Zuckmayer (1896–1977), German writer, lived for some years in Henndorf
- Richard Mayr (1877-1935) renowned Austrian Bass-Baritone was very closely associated with Henndorf.

== See also ==
- Salzkammergut
- Salzkammergut-Lokalbahn
- Salzburg S-Bahn
