= Christoph Langwallner =

Austrian entrepreneur

- Born: 24 July 1972 (age 54); Salzburg, Austria
- Education: The Open University – MBA in Finance and Marketing; The College for Food Technology and Meat Processing at HTL Hollabrunn – Ingenieur's degree; Oxford Said Business School – Private Equity Programme
- Occupations: Entrepreneur; investor
- Title: CEO and founder of WhatIF Foods; Co-founder of NamZ; Originator of the Nutritional Paradox; Founder of SYMEGA Savoury technology Ltd.; Founder of Amadeus Private Ltd.
- Spouse: Margit Langwallner
- Children: 2
- Parent: Roswitha Langwallner (mother) Werner Langwallner (father)

Christoph Langwallner (born July 24, 1972) is an Austrian entrepreneur and investor. He is the CEO and co-founder of WhatIF Foods and the Nutritional Paradox. Langwallner is also the co-founder of SYMEGA Savoury Technology Ltd. and Amadeus Holdings Pte Ltd.

== Early life and education ==
Langwallner is one of two children born to Roswitha and Werner Langwallner. He was raised in Nussdorf am Haunsberg, north of Salzburg, Austria.

Langwallner holds a Master of Business Administration (MBA) in Finance and Marketing from The Open University Business School in Milton Keynes, UK, following an Ingenieur's degree for Food Technology and Meat Processing at HTL Hollabrunn, and a diploma from the technical school for Agriculture in Salzburg at Schloss Klessheim.

== Career ==
In 2014, Langwallner co-founded NamZ – a bio-science innovation incubator and predecessor to WhatIF Foods.

The dehydration technology innovated by Langwallner and Peter Cheetham at NamZ allowed the company to develop multi-colored noodles which use regenerative crops like the Bambara groundnut.

Langwallner founded WhaIF Foods, a consumer-facing brand, in 2020 to address what he calls the dysfunctional state of the food industry, which creates calorie-rich, nutrient poor foods in environmentally unsustainable ways, by adopting the technologies developed at NamZ.

Patents:

Langwallner is the co-inventor of 3 patents:

- US20180338515A1
- WO2018009149A1
- WO2017127025A1
