= Eugendorf =

- Municipality
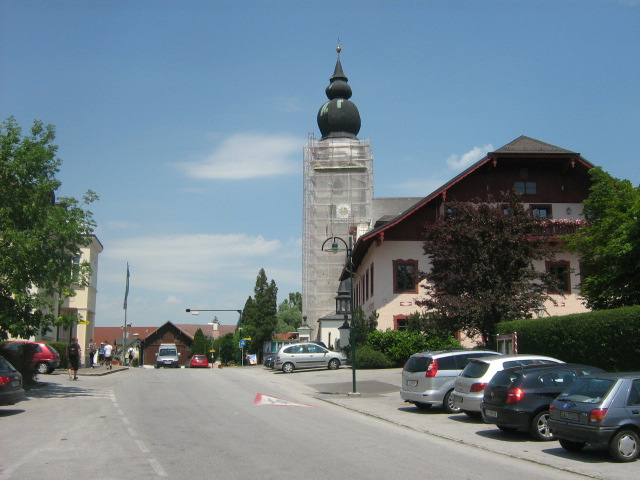

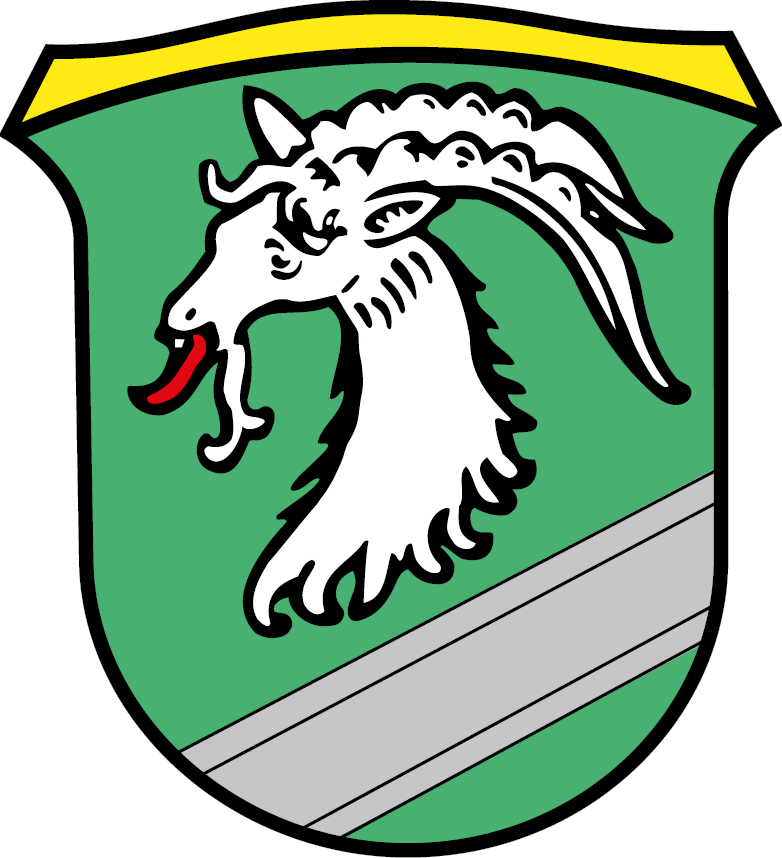
- Coat of arms

- Location within Austria
- Coordinates: 47°52′01″N 13°07′27″E
- Country: Austria
- State: Salzburg
- District: Salzburg-Umgebung

Government
  - Mayor: Johann Strasser (ÖVP)

Area
  - Total: 29.04 km^{2} (11.21 sq mi)
- Elevation: 560 m (1,840 ft)

Population (2018-01-01)
  - Total: 6,937
  - Density: 238.9/km^{2} (618.7/sq mi)
- Time zone: UTC+1 (CET)
  - Summer (DST): UTC+2 (CEST)
- Postal code: 5301
- Area code: 06225
- Vehicle registration: SL
- Website: www.eugendorf.at

Eugendorf is a market town of 6,439 inhabitants in the district of Salzburg-Umgebung in the state of Salzburg in Austria.

== History ==
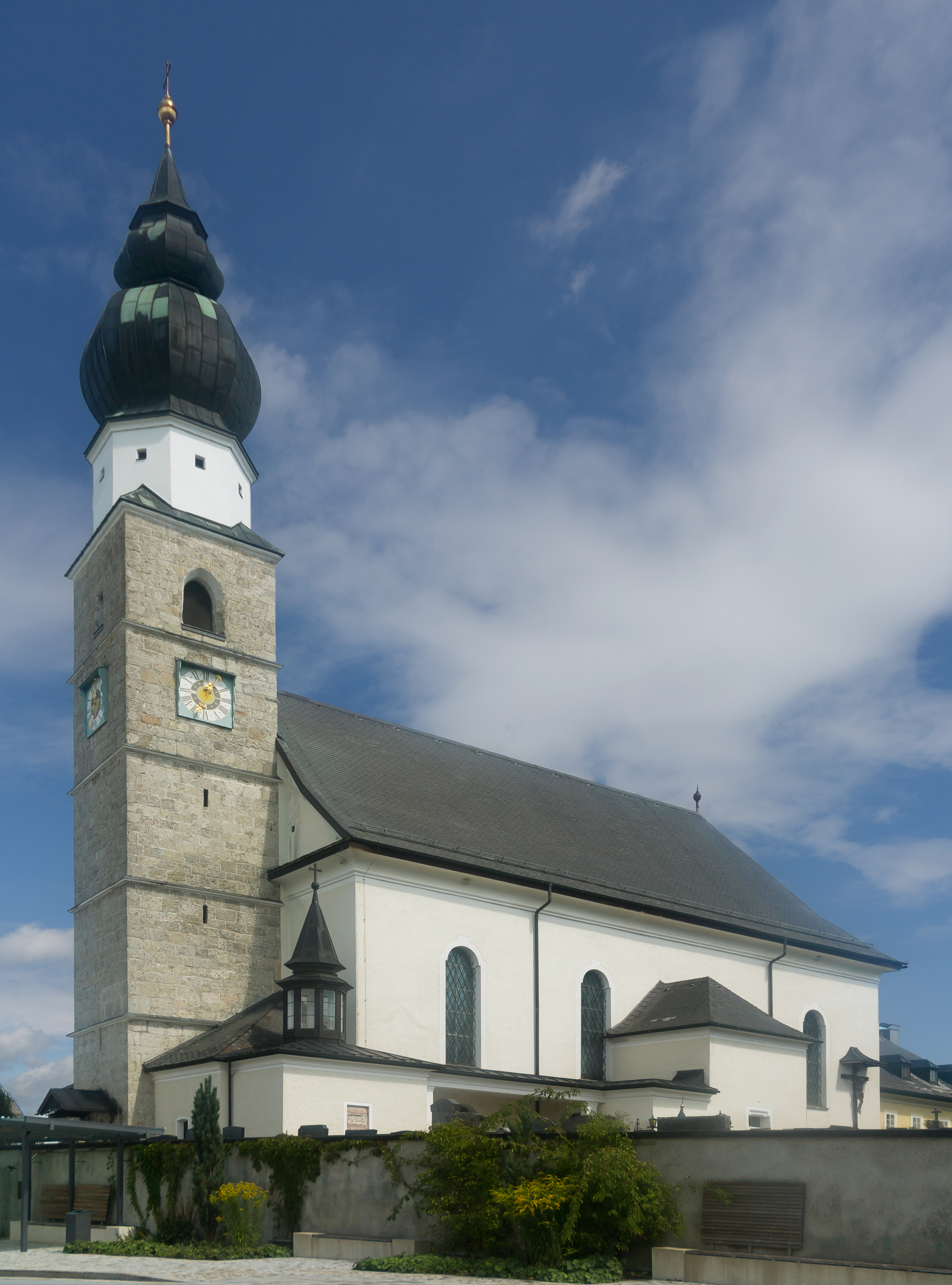
Sankt Martin church

The town was first documented in the year 736.

== Geography ==
Eugendorf is located about 10 kilometres to the northeast of Salzburg between the city and the Wallersee lake. The municipality borders with Seekirchen am Wallersee, Henndorf am Wallersee, Hallwang, Thalgau, Koppl and Thalgau. It is divided into 10 Ortschaften: the town of Eugendorf and 9 villages:

Village	Population (2015)
Eugendorf	2,144
Eugenbach	952
Kalham	458
Kirchberg	201
Knutzing	156
Neuhofen	303
Pebering	454
Reitberg	1,186
Schaming	334
Schwaighofen	635

== Transport ==
Eugendorf has a station on the international Westbahn Railway, that is also served by the Salzburg S-Bahn. It is also served by the A1 motorway at the exit "Wallersee-Eugendorf".

== See also ==
- Salzkammergut
- Salzkammergut-Lokalbahn
