= Berndorf =

Berndorf may refer to several places:

- Berndorf, Rhineland-Palatinate, in Rhineland-Palatinate, Germany
- Berndorf, part of Twistetal, Hesse, Germany
- Berndorf, Lower Austria, Austria
- Berndorf bei Salzburg, a town in the district of Salzburg-Umgebung in Austria
