= Faistenau =

- Municipality
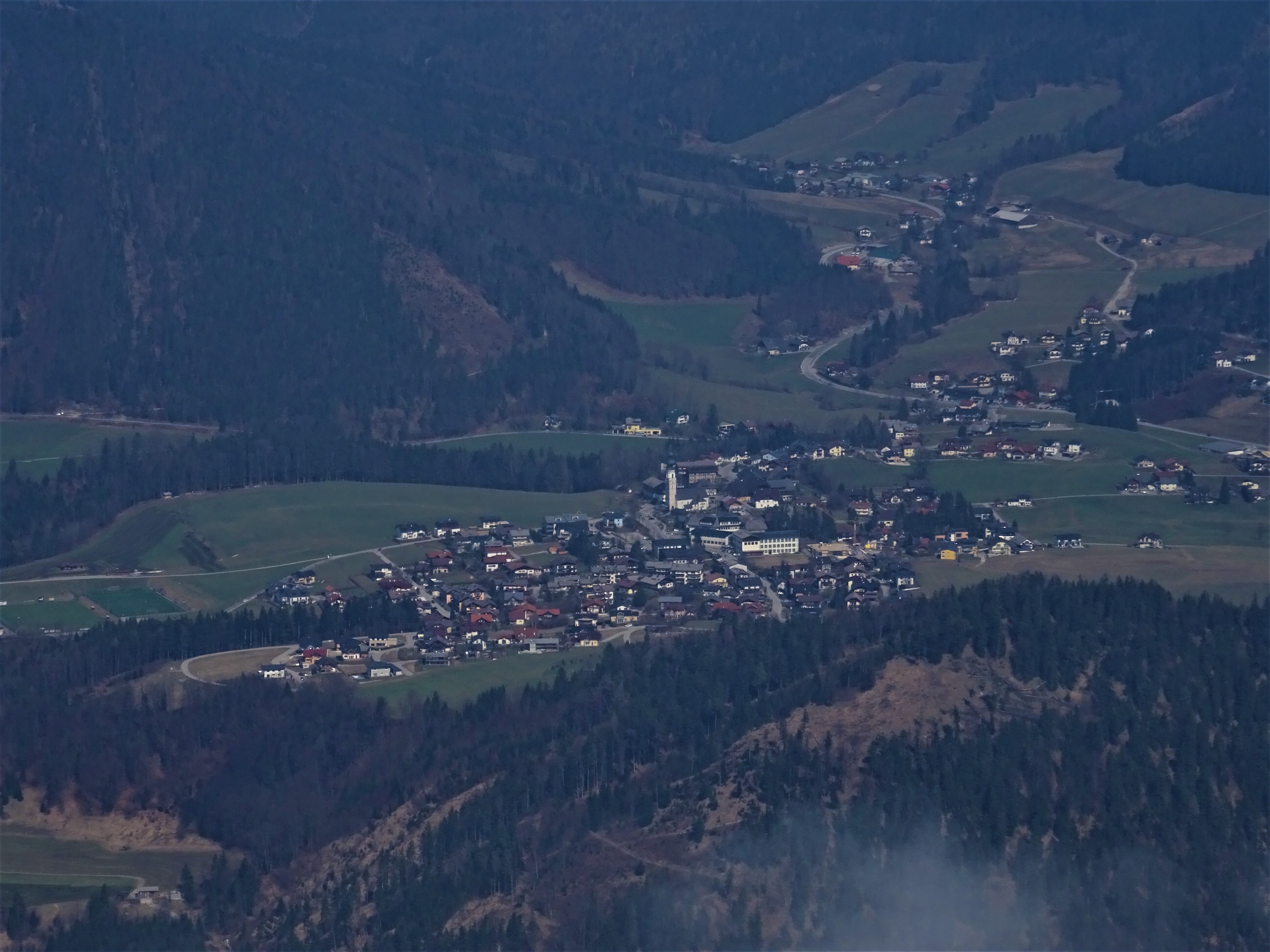

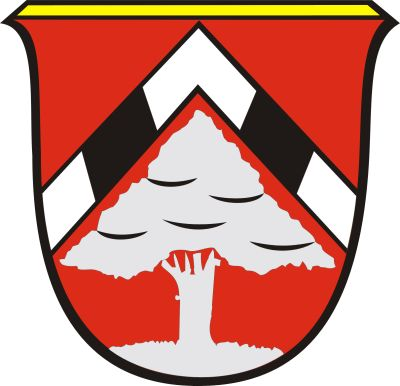
- Coat of arms

- Location within Austria
- Coordinates: 47°46′00″N 13°13′00″E
- Country: Austria
- State: Salzburg
- District: Salzburg-Umgebung

Government
  - Mayor: Hubert Ebner (ÖVP)

Area
  - Total: 51.24 km^{2} (19.78 sq mi)
- Elevation: 784 m (2,572 ft)

Population (2018-01-01)
  - Total: 3,103
  - Density: 60.56/km^{2} (156.8/sq mi)
- Time zone: UTC+1 (CET)
  - Summer (DST): UTC+2 (CEST)
- Postal code: 5324
- Area code: 06228
- Vehicle registration: SL
- Website: www.faistenau.at

Faistenau is a municipality in the Austrian state of Salzburg.

== Geography ==
It is located in the district of Salzburg-Umgebung. It is a significant tourist destination, located in the Salzkammergut region known for its natural lakes.

== Population ==
As of 15 May 2001 Faistenau had a population of 2,850, of whom 49.6% are male and 50.4% female. The earliest population records for Faistenau are from 1869, at which time the municipality had 1,103 inhabitants.
