= Elsbethen =

- Municipality
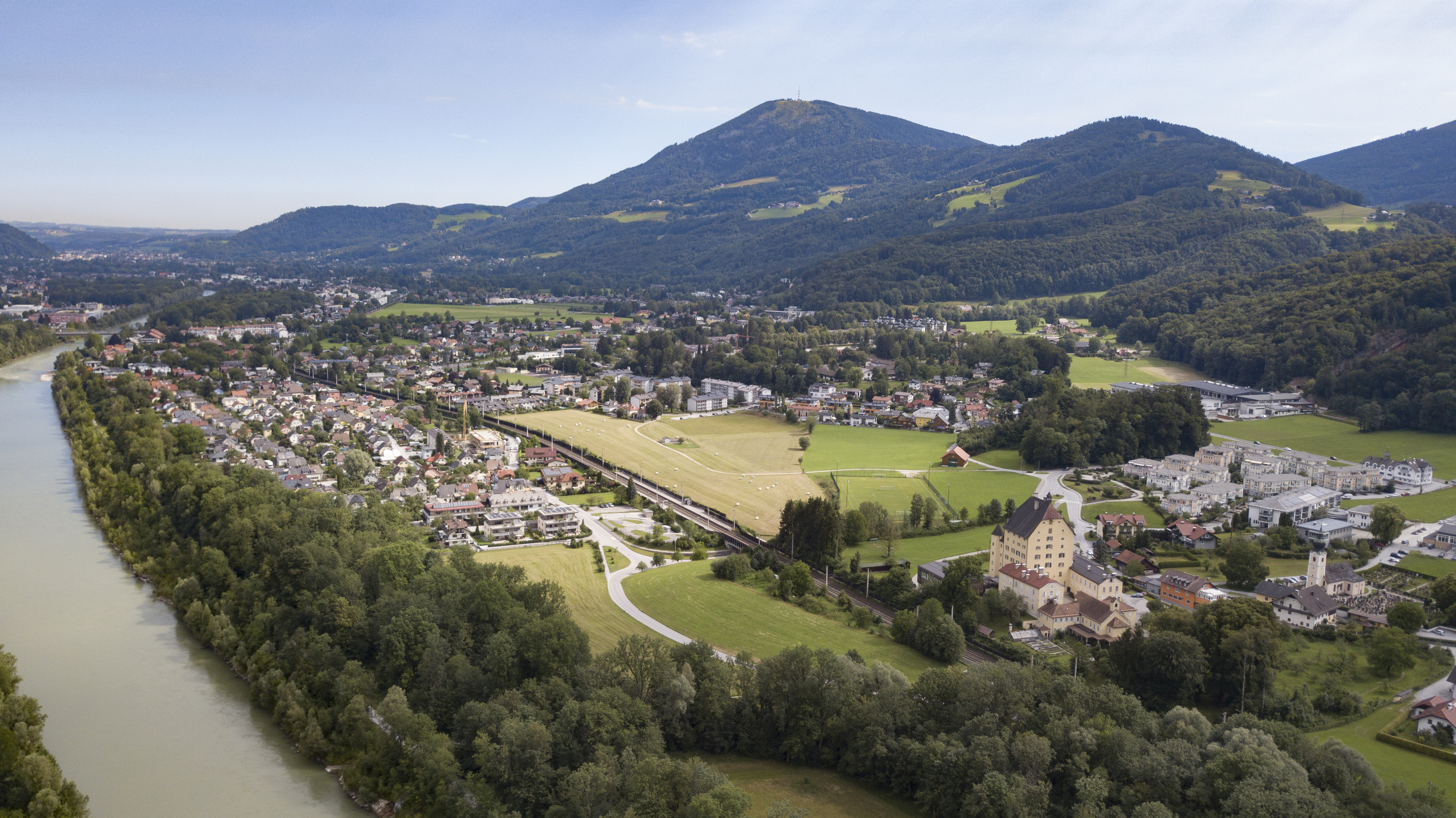
- Elsbethen

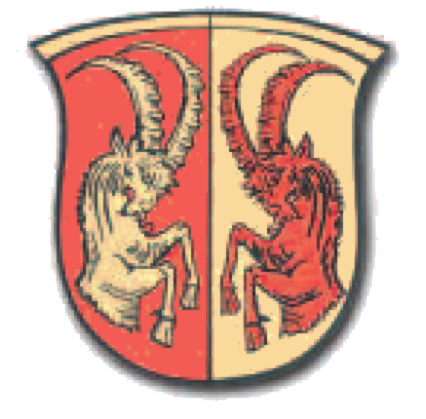
- Coat of arms

- Location within Austria
- Coordinates: 47°45′49″N 13°04′54″E
- Country: Austria
- State: Salzburg
- District: Salzburg-Umgebung

Government
  - Mayor: Matthias Herbst (ÖVP)

Area
  - Total: 23.94 km^{2} (9.24 sq mi)
- Elevation: 1,334 m (4,377 ft)

Population (2018-01-01)
  - Total: 5,424
  - Density: 226.6/km^{2} (586.8/sq mi)
- Time zone: UTC+1 (CET)
  - Summer (DST): UTC+2 (CEST)
- Postal code: 5061
- Area code: 0662
- Vehicle registration: SL
- Website: www.gde-elsbethen.at

Elsbethen is a municipality in the district of Salzburg-Umgebung in the Austrian state of Salzburg.

== Geography ==
The town lies directly south of the federal state capital, Salzburg, and borders Flachgau. Parts of the town have become infrastructurally connected with Salzburg.

The highest points in the Elsbethen area are the Schwarzenberg, the Gurlspitze and the Mühlstein.

== History ==
Elsbethen was first mentioned in 930 as Campanuaua. After the Second World War Glasenbach was home to an Allied POW camp, where members of Nazi organizations and war criminals were held.

== Politics ==
The mayor of Elsbethen is the graduate engineer Franz Tiefenbacher (ÖVP), the vice mayors are Edi Knoblechner (SPÖ) and Sebastian Haslauer (ÖVP).

== Buildings ==
The most famous building in Elsbethen is Schloss Goldenstein, which serves today as a private girls' school, attended at one time by Romy Schneider. The building is internationally known for being occupied by three nuns that re-settled the building (in 2025) after a group got a locksmith to break into the building. Next to Schloss Goldenstein is the gothic Elsbethen church.

== Transit ==
Elsbethen lies directly on the route of the Salzburg-Tyrol train, and has its own station. As well, there is the Salzburg-Sud station in Glasenbach.
