= Straßwalchen =

Straßwalchen Strosswoicher
- Municipality
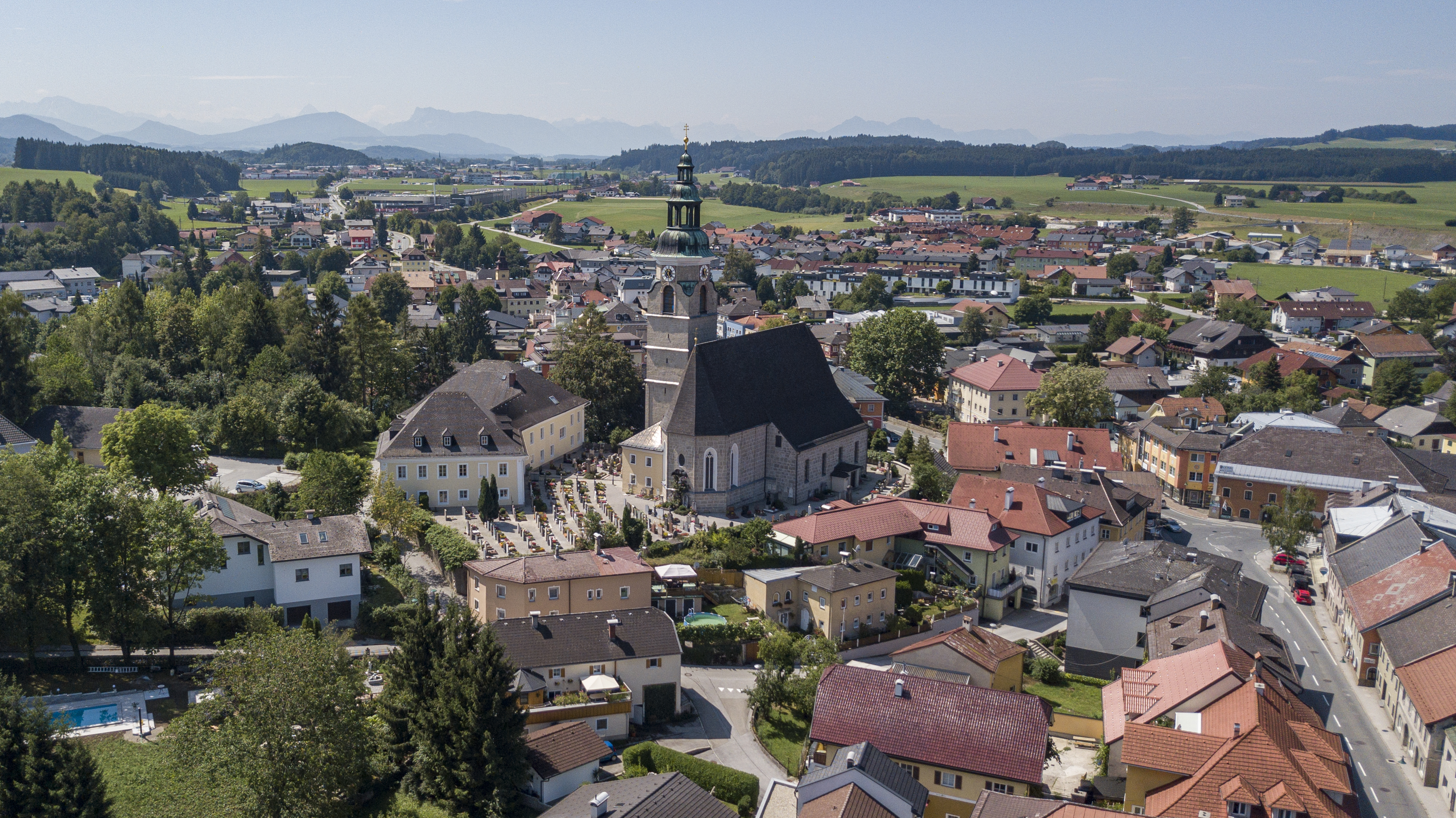

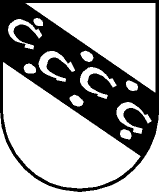
- Coat of arms

- Location within Austria
- Coordinates: 47°58′48″N 13°15′17″E
- Country: Austria
- State: Salzburg
- District: Salzburg-Umgebung

Government
  - Mayor: Tanja Kreer (SPÖ)

Area
  - Total: 44.53 km^{2} (17.19 sq mi)
- Elevation: 528 m (1,732 ft)

Population (2018-01-01)
  - Total: 7,420
  - Density: 167/km^{2} (432/sq mi)
- Time zone: UTC+1 (CET)
  - Summer (DST): UTC+2 (CEST)
- Postal code: 5204
- Area code: 06215
- Vehicle registration: SL
- Website: www.strasswalchen.at

Straßwalchen (Central Bavarian: Strosswoicher) is a market town in the district of Salzburg-Umgebung (Flachgau) in the state of Salzburg in Austria.

== Geography ==
The municipal area stretches along the northeastern border of Salzburg with the state of Upper Austria. It comprises the cadastral communities of Bruckmoos, Brunn, Haselreith, Irrsdorf, Straßwalchen-Land, and Straßwalchen-Markt.

Straßwalchen has access to the Austrian Western Railway line from the city of Salzburg to the capital Vienna, built in 1860 by the Empress Elisabeth Railway company. With the Western Railway Straßwalchen is connected to the Salzburg S-Bahn public transport network, as northeastern terminus of the S2 line. The parallel road link to Vienna (Wiener Straße) has become less important with the 1963 opening of the West Autobahn farther south.

== History ==
Archaeological finds indicate a settlement of the area since the Neolithic era. From the 6th century onwards, Bavarii tribes moved into the region—the name Strazzuualaha, first documented in 799, is probably derived from walha, the Proto-Germanic denotation for a Latinized population they had encountered, similar to nearby Seewalchen or Wals.

While the Lordship of Straßwalchen was held by the Prince-Bishops of Passau since 1243, the economically important toll station passed to the Wittelsbach dukes of Bavaria in 1286, which sparked a long-time dissension between the rivaling rulers. In 1390 the Passau bishops bequeathed the larger Lordship of Mattsee with Straßwalchen to the Archbishopric of Salzburg. Prince-Archbishop Burkhard Weisbriach granted market privileges to the citizens in 1462.

The Salzburg archbishopric retained Straßwalchen until its secularisation in 1803, however, the Dukes of Bavaria—Electors from 1623—insisted on their claims. From 1810 to 1816 the Kingdom of Bavaria, newly established with the support of Napoleon, comprised the Salzburg territory with Straßwalchen, before it finally passed to the Austrian Empire according to the resolutions of the Vienna Congress.

== Politics ==
Seats in the municipal assembly (Gemeindevertretung) as of 2009 elections:

- Austrian People's Party (ÖVP): 13
- Social Democratic Party of Austria (SPÖ): 7
- Freedom Party of Austria (FPÖ): 3
- Free Voters: 2

== Gallery ==
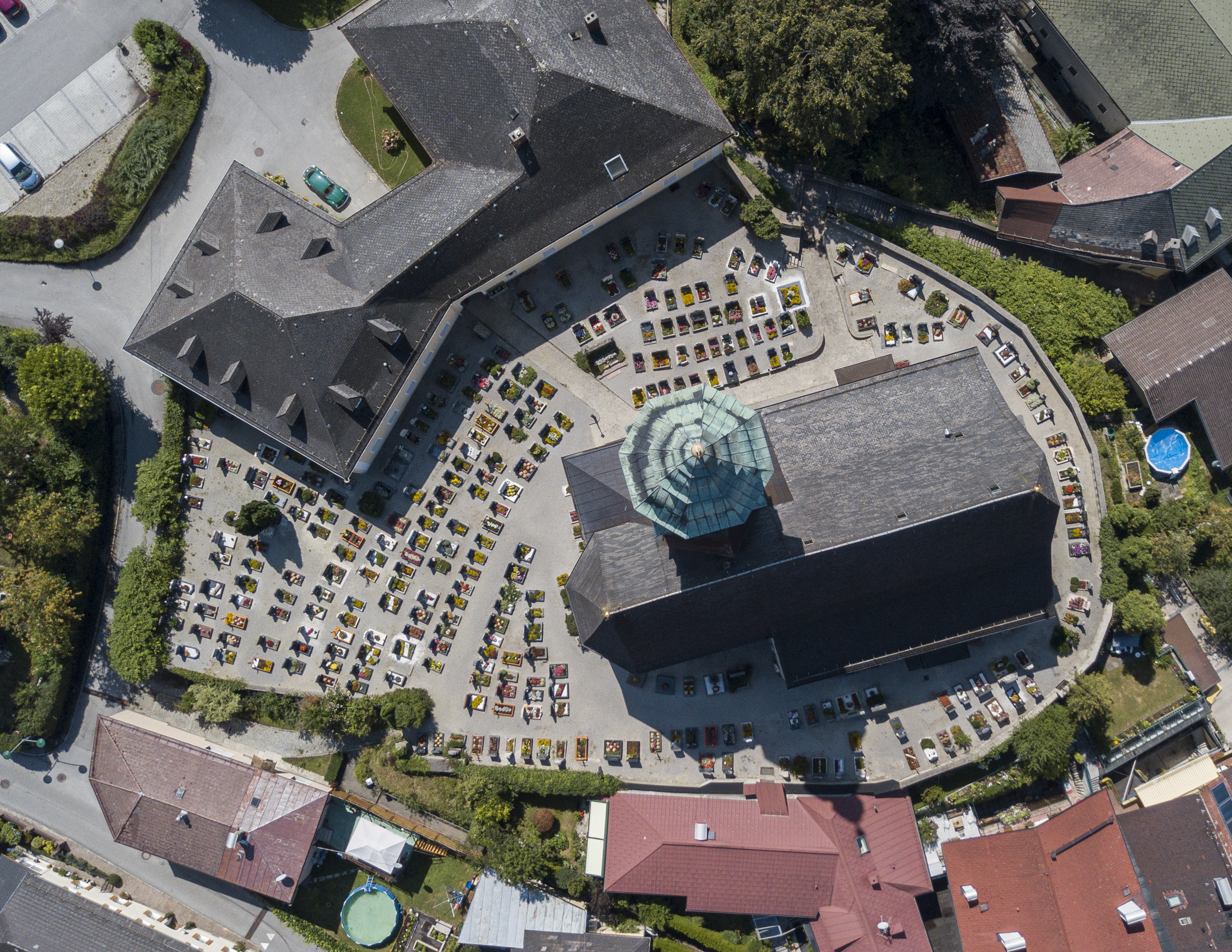
Church and Cemetery

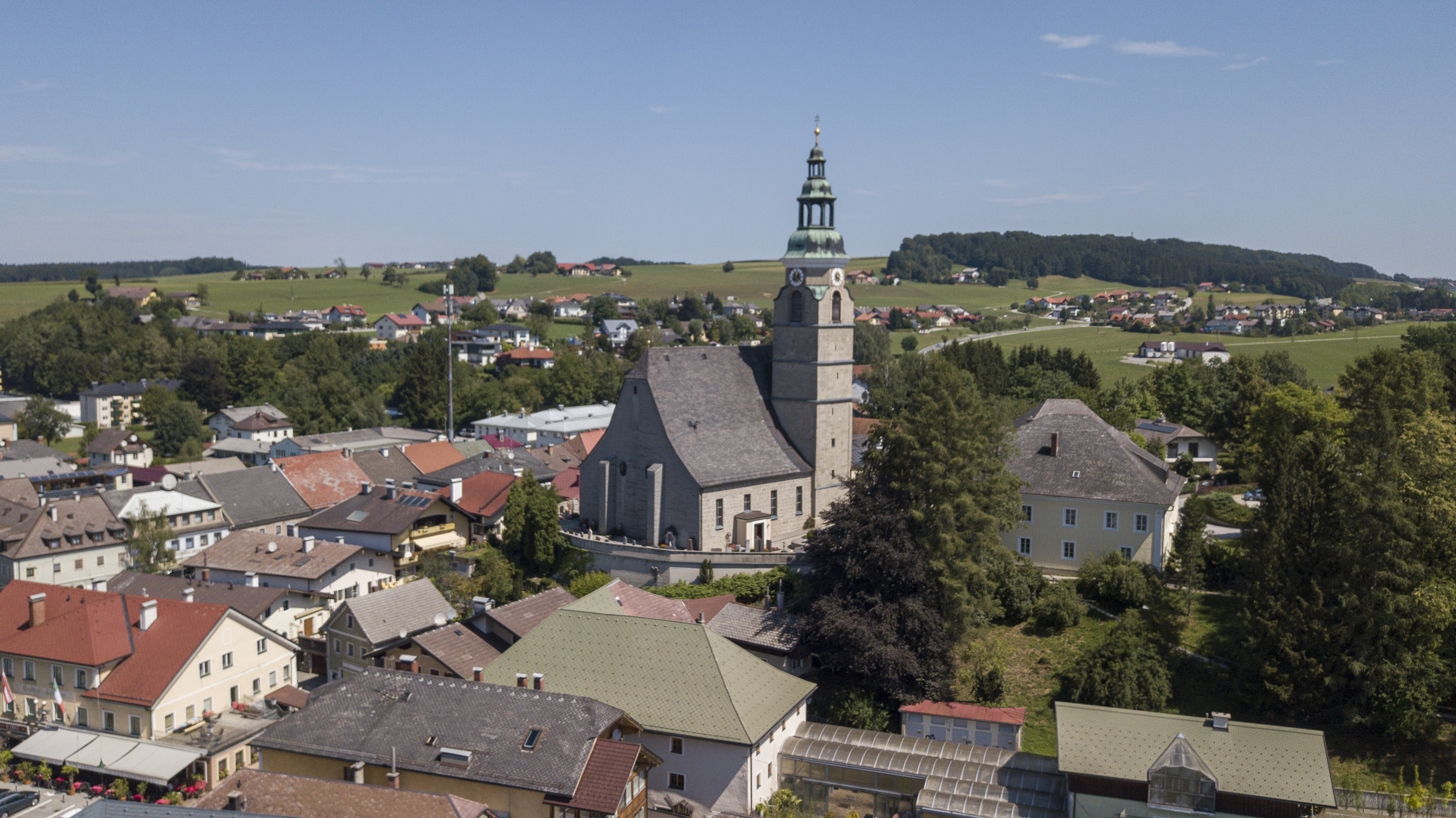
Straßwalchen
