= Anthering =

- Municipality
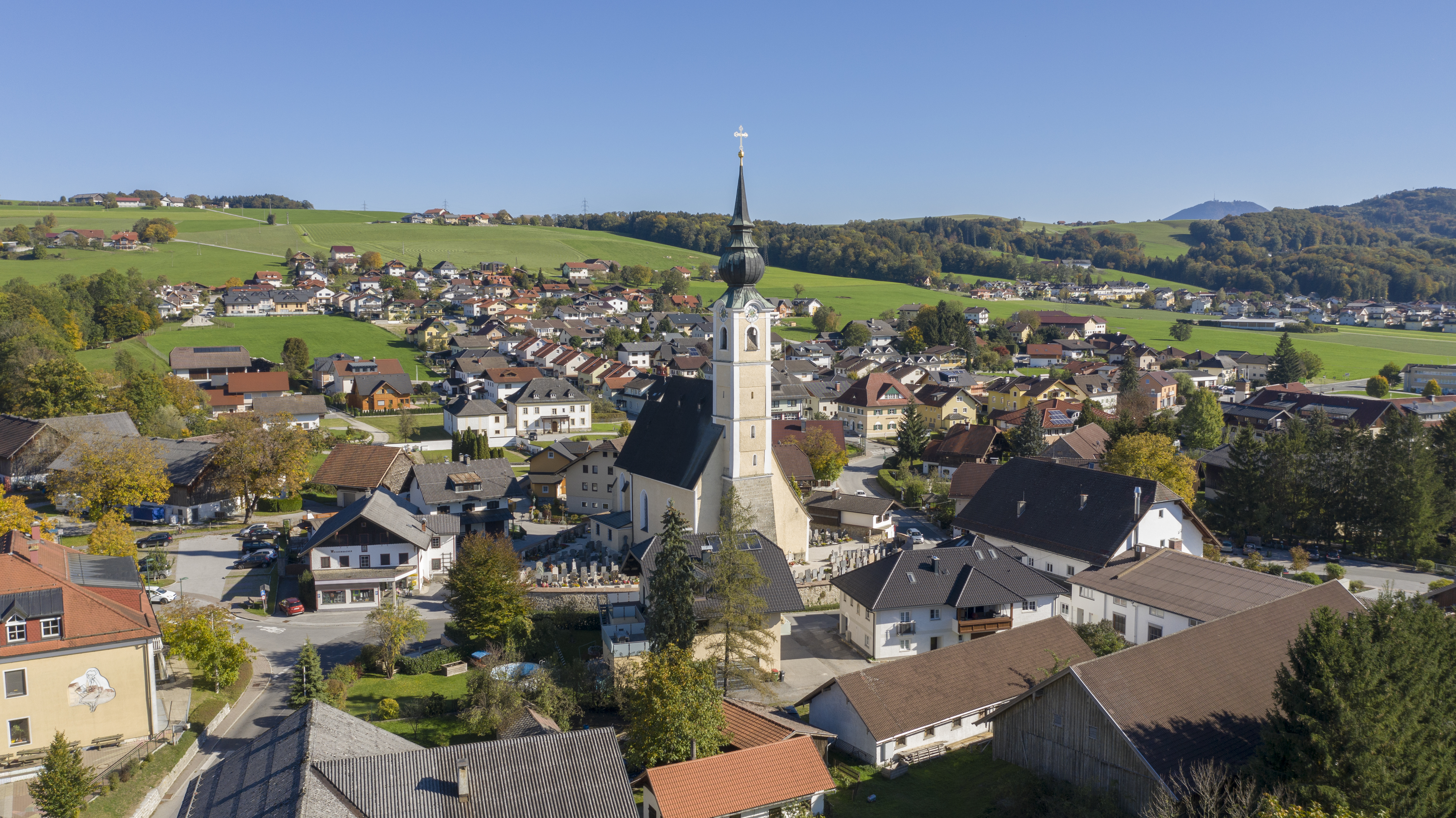

- Flag Coat of arms

- Location within Austria
- Coordinates: 47°52′00″N 13°01′00″E
- Country: Austria
- State: Salzburg
- District: Salzburg-Umgebung

Government
  - Mayor: Alois Mühlbacher (ÖVP)

Area
  - Total: 25.28 km^{2} (9.76 sq mi)
- Elevation: 422 m (1,385 ft)

Population (2018-01-01)
  - Total: 3,734
  - Density: 147.7/km^{2} (382.6/sq mi)
- Time zone: UTC+1 (CET)
  - Summer (DST): UTC+2 (CEST)
- Postal code: 5102
- Area code: 06223
- Vehicle registration: SL
- Website: www.anthering.at

Anthering is a municipality in the district of Salzburg-Umgebung in the state of Salzburg in Austria.

== Geography ==
Anthering lies north of the Salzburg basin. The Salzach forms the western boundary, which is also the border with Bavaria. On the east is the small town of Seekirchen am Wallersee.
