= Lamprechtshausen =

- Municipality
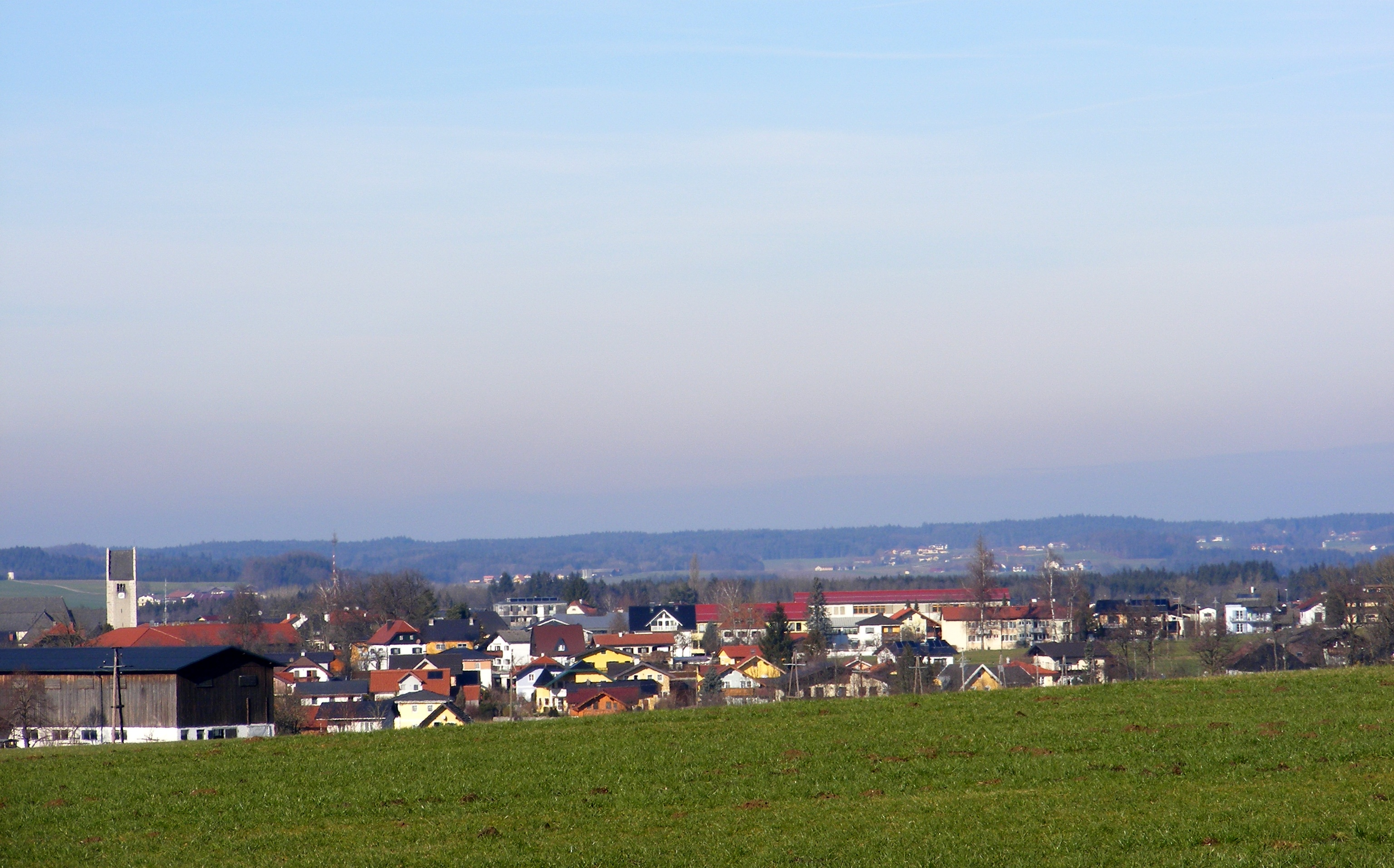
- View of Lamprechtshausen

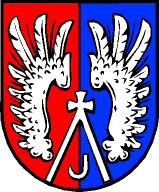
- Coat of arms

- Location within Austria
- Coordinates: 47°58′00″N 12°56′00″E
- Country: Austria
- State: Salzburg
- District: Salzburg-Umgebung

Government
  - Mayor: Johann Grießner (ÖVP)

Area
  - Total: 31.77 km^{2} (12.27 sq mi)
- Elevation: 458 m (1,503 ft)

Population (2018-01-01)
  - Total: 4,037
  - Density: 127.1/km^{2} (329.1/sq mi)
- Time zone: UTC+1 (CET)
  - Summer (DST): UTC+2 (CEST)
- Postal code: 5112
- Area code: 06274
- Vehicle registration: SL
- Website: www.lamprechtshausen.at

Lamprechtshausen (Central Bavarian: ‘’Låmbéhausen’’) is a municipality in the district of Salzburg-Umgebung in the state of Salzburg in Austria.

== Geography ==
Lamprechtshausen lies in the north of the district of Salzburg-Umgebung in the Flachgau about 22 km north of the city of Salzburg in the Salzburg Prealps. The municipality is partly flat and partly slightly hilly. It has very little forest. The municipality of Lamprechtshausen is divided into four cadastral communities: Arnsdorf, Lamprechtshausen, Schwerting, and St. Alban.
