= Köstendorf =

- Municipality
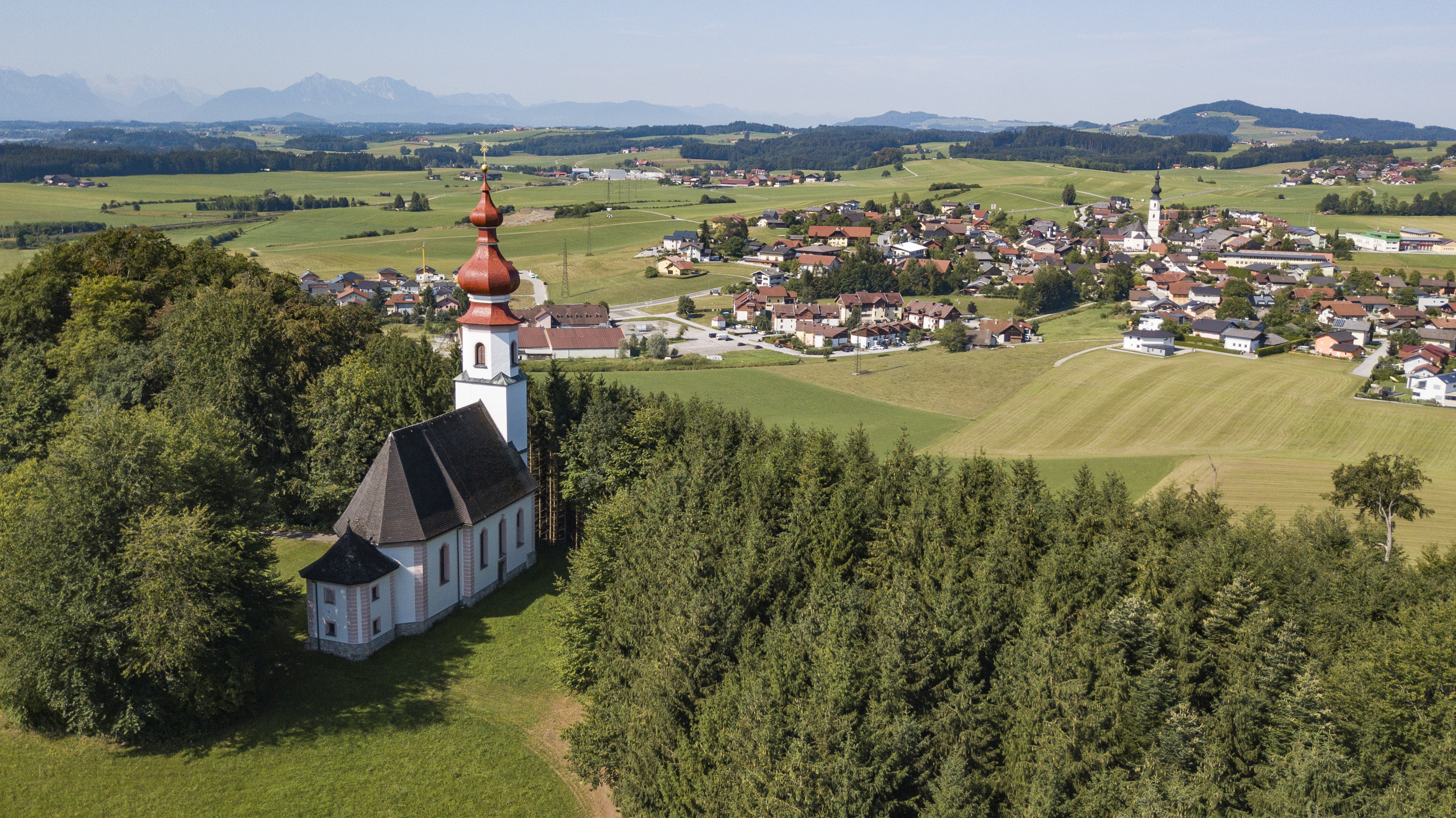
- Aerial view of Köstendorf

- Flag Coat of arms

- Location within Austria
- Coordinates: 47°57′26″N 13°11′50″E
- Country: Austria
- State: Salzburg
- District: Salzburg-Umgebung

Government
  - Mayor: Josef Krois (ÖVP)

Area
  - Total: 23.1 km^{2} (8.9 sq mi)
- Elevation: 561 m (1,841 ft)

Population (2018-01-01)
  - Total: 2,631
  - Density: 114/km^{2} (295/sq mi)
- Time zone: UTC+1 (CET)
  - Summer (DST): UTC+2 (CEST)
- Postal code: 5203
- Area code: 06216
- Vehicle registration: SL
- Website: www.koestendorf.at

Köstendorf is a municipality in the district of Salzburg-Umgebung in the state of Salzburg in Austria.

== Geography ==
Köstendorf lies 15 km northeast of the city of Salzburg on the Wallersee. It borders on the municipalities of Neumarkt am Wallersee, Seekirchen, and Schleedorf.
