= Obertrum =

Obertrum am See
- Municipality
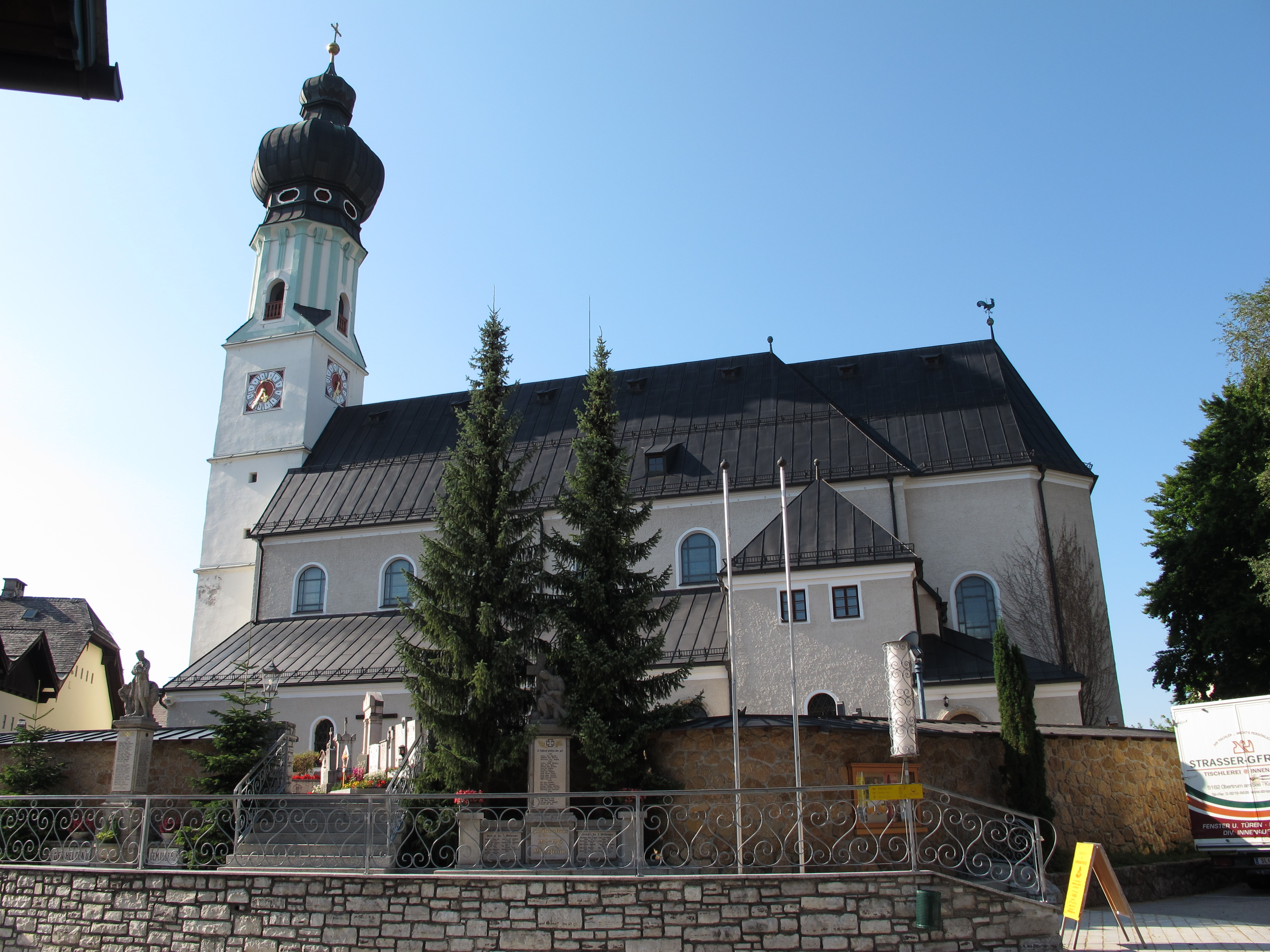
- Obertrum parish church

- Flag Coat of arms

- Location within Austria
- Coordinates: 47°56′00″N 13°04′00″E
- Country: Austria
- State: Salzburg
- District: Salzburg-Umgebung

Government
  - Mayor: Simon Wallner (ÖVP)

Area
  - Total: 21.27 km^{2} (8.21 sq mi)
- Elevation: 511 m (1,677 ft)

Population (2018-01-01)
  - Total: 4,808
  - Density: 226.0/km^{2} (585.5/sq mi)
- Time zone: UTC+1 (CET)
  - Summer (DST): UTC+2 (CEST)
- Postal code: 5162
- Area code: 06219
- Vehicle registration: SL
- Website: www.obertrum.at

Obertrum am See is a market town in the district of Salzburg-Umgebung in the state of Salzburg in Austria. It had a population of 4,639 as of January 1, 2014.

== Geography ==
The town is located roughly 15 km north of Salzburg in the Flachgau at the southern end of the Obertrumer See. The lake, together with Mattsee, Wallersee and Grabensee, forms the Salzburg lake district, a touristic area.

Obertrum is surrounded by Haunsberg on the east side and the Buchberg on the west side.

== History ==
Obertrum am See was first mentioned in 1143 as "Druma", which is a rough equivalent of "south end of the sea". This comes from the fact that the three lakes nearby were connected in the past.

Until 1398 the bishopric of Passau had control over the region near Mattsee, which included Obertrum. From this time on it was part of the Archbishopric of Salzburg, within which it became part of Austria in 1805.

== Population ==
Historical population
Year	Pop.	±%
1869	1,235	—
1880	1,241	+0.5%
1890	1,242	+0.1%
1900	1,249	+0.6%
1910	1,327	+6.2%
1923	1,431	+7.8%
1934	1,515	+5.9%
1939	1,436	−5.2%
1951	1,720	+19.8%
1961	1,818	+5.7%
1971	2,076	+14.2%
1981	2,573	+23.9%
1991	3,379	+31.3%
2001	4,208	+24.5%
2007	4,458	+5.9%
2014	4,639	+4.1%
