= Salzburg-Umgebung District =

Coordinates: 47.867°N 13.083°E

Bezirk Salzburg-Umgebung
- District
- Country: Austria
- State: Salzburg
- Number of municipalities: 37
- Administrative seat: Seekirchen

Area
  - Total: 1,004.47 km^{2} (387.83 sq mi)
- Elevation: 624 m (2,047 ft)

Population (2023)
  - Total: 157,440
  - Density: 156.74/km^{2} (405.95/sq mi)
- Time zone: UTC+01:00 (CET)
- Vehicle registration: SL
- NUTS code: AT323

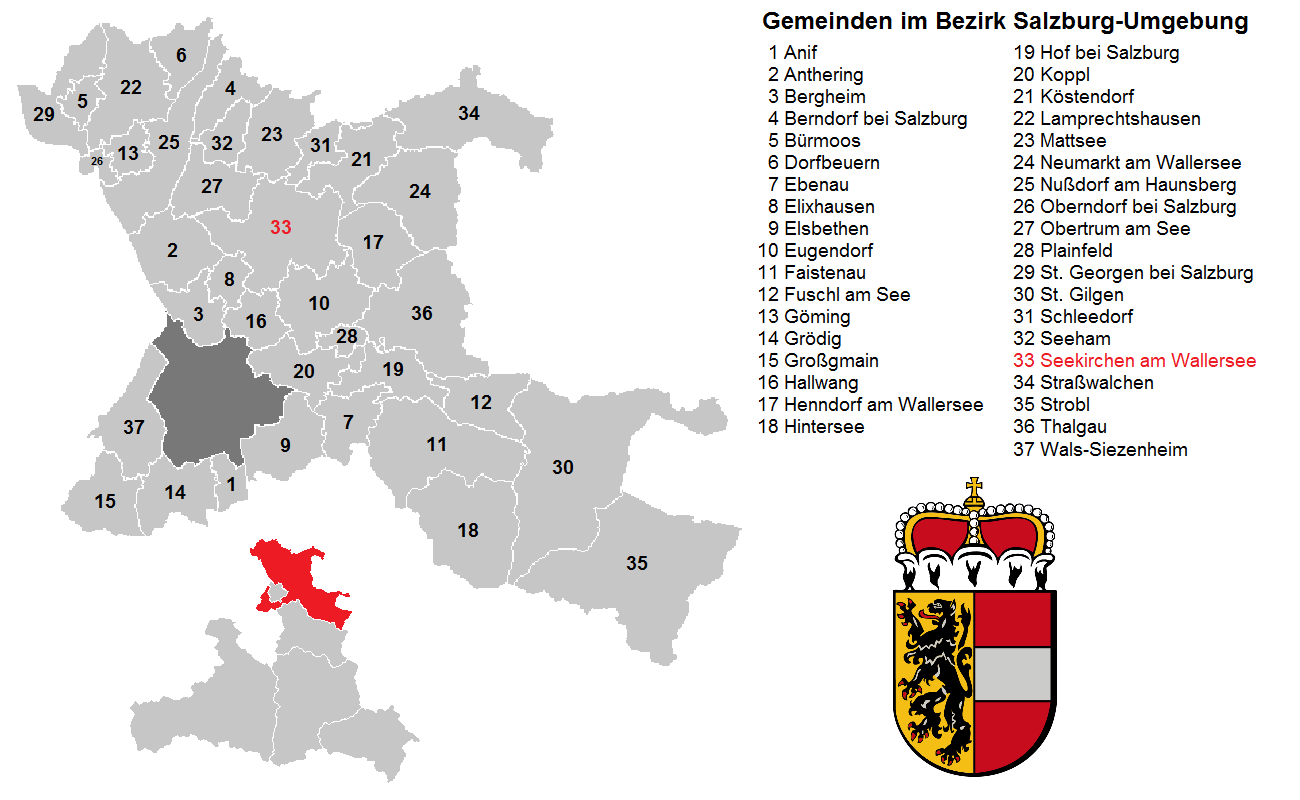
District map divided per municipalities (click to enlarge)

Historical population
Year	Pop.	±%
1869	37,004	—
1880	38,261	+3.4%
1890	40,722	+6.4%
1900	41,928	+3.0%
1910	45,313	+8.1%
1923	47,522	+4.9%
1934	49,736	+4.7%
1939	50,009	+0.5%
1951	64,236	+28.4%
1961	70,913	+10.4%
1971	85,032	+19.9%
1981	98,733	+16.1%
1991	118,137	+19.7%
2001	135,104	+14.4%
2011	143,081	+5.9%
2023	157,440	+10.0%

The Bezirk Salzburg-Umgebung (German, "surrounding area of Salzburg") is an administrative district (Bezirk) in the federal state of Salzburg, Austria, and congruent with the Flachgau region (German pronunciation: [ˈflaxˌɡaʊ̯]), except for the Statutarstadt of Salzburg, which forms a district of its own.

Area of the district is 1,004.47 km^{2}, with a population of 157,440 (January 1, 2023), and population density 157 persons per km^{2}. Administrative center of the district is Seekirchen am Wallersee.

== Administrative divisions ==
The district is divided into 37 municipalities, three of them are towns, and six of them are market towns.

(population numbers Jan. 1, 2023)

=== Towns ===
1. Neumarkt am Wallersee (6,626)
2. Oberndorf bei Salzburg (6,058)
3. Seekirchen am Wallersee (11,233)

=== Market towns ===
1. Eugendorf (7,199)
2. Grödig (7,408)
3. Mattsee (3,499)
4. Obertrum (4,958)
5. Straßwalchen (8,011)
6. Thalgau (6,030)

=== Municipalities ===
1. Anif (4,286)
2. Anthering (3,748)
3. Bergheim (5,855)
4. Berndorf bei Salzburg (1,744)
5. Bürmoos (5,027)
6. Dorfbeuern (1,621)
7. Ebenau (1,434)
8. Elixhausen (3,128)
9. Elsbethen (5,507)
10. Faistenau (3,100)
11. Fuschl am See (1,659)
12. Göming (761)
13. Großgmain (2,614)
14. Hallwang (4,235)
15. Henndorf am Wallersee (5,078)
16. Hintersee (470)
17. Hof bei Salzburg (3,630)
18. Koppl (3,679)
19. Köstendorf (2,678)
20. Lamprechtshausen (4,078)
21. Nußdorf am Haunsberg (2,535)
22. Plainfeld (1,305)
23. St. Georgen bei Salzburg (3,081)
24. St. Gilgen (4,076)
25. Schleedorf (1,148)
26. Seeham (2,004)
27. Strobl (3,691)
28. Wals-Siezenheim (14,246)

== Notable Citizens ==
- Leopold Kohr was born in Oberndorf near Salzburg.
- Andreas Maislinger was born in St. Georgen near Salzburg.
- Carl Zuckmayer lived in Henndorf am Wallersee near Salzburg from 1933 to 1938.

== Traditions ==
- The Aperschnalzen is an old tradition of competitive whipcracking.
