= Seeham =

- Municipality
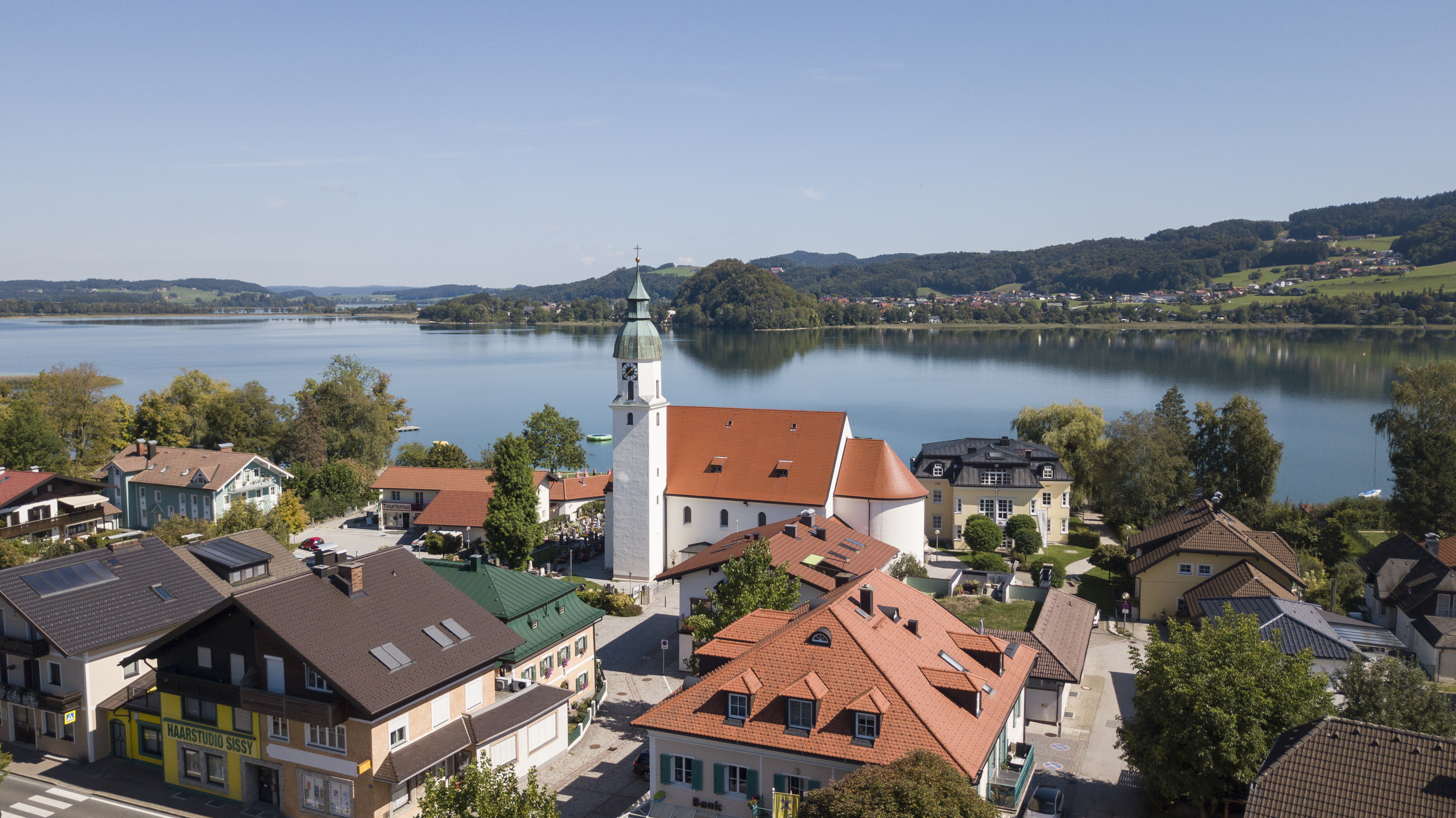

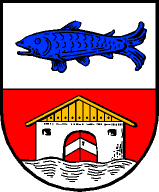
- Coat of arms

- Location within Austria
- Coordinates: 47°58′00″N 13°04′00″E
- Country: Austria
- State: Salzburg
- District: Salzburg-Umgebung

Government
  - Mayor: Peter Altendorfer (ÖVP)

Area
  - Total: 10.4 km^{2} (4.0 sq mi)
- Elevation: 503 m (1,650 ft)

Population (2018-01-01)
  - Total: 1,939
  - Density: 186/km^{2} (483/sq mi)
- Time zone: UTC+1 (CET)
  - Summer (DST): UTC+2 (CEST)
- Postal code: 5164
- Area code: 06217
- Vehicle registration: SL
- Website: www.seeham.at

Seeham is a municipality in the district of Salzburg-Umgebung in the state of Salzburg in Austria.

== Geography ==
Seeham is located in the Salzburg Lake District, on the western shore of Lake Obertrum. The municipality is surrounded by gently rolling hills and natural woodlands, creating a scenic and tranquil setting that blends rural charm with lakeside beauty. The landscape is characterized by a harmonious interaction between nature and agriculture, with more than 80% of local farming certified as organic, contributing to Seeham's reputation as an "organic paradise."

== Demographics ==
As of 2026, Seeham has an estimated population of 2,350 residents, according to figures from Statistics Austria. The municipality covers an area of 10.40 km², resulting in a population density of approximately 250 inhabitants per square kilometer. Between 2021 and 2026, the population grew at an average annual rate of 1.4%, reflecting a modest but steady increase.

The gender distribution in Seeham is relatively balanced, with 1,008 males (49.5%) and 1,027 females (50.5%). The age structure indicates a mature and stable population: 17.7% are children under 18 years old, 62.2% are in the working-age group of 18 to 64, and 20.1% are seniors aged 65 and over.

A large majority of the population (85.9%) hold Austrian citizenship. Citizens from other European Union countries, EFTA states, or the United Kingdom make up 9.4%, while 1.9% hold citizenship from non-European countries. The figures for country of birth closely mirror the citizenship statistics, with 87.7% born in Austria, 8.9% born in other European Union, EFTA countries, or the United Kingdom, and 3.4% born outside of Europe.

These figures suggest that while Seeham remains predominantly Austrian in its demographic makeup, it is also home to a small but notable international community, primarily from within Europe.
