= Hallwang =

- Municipality
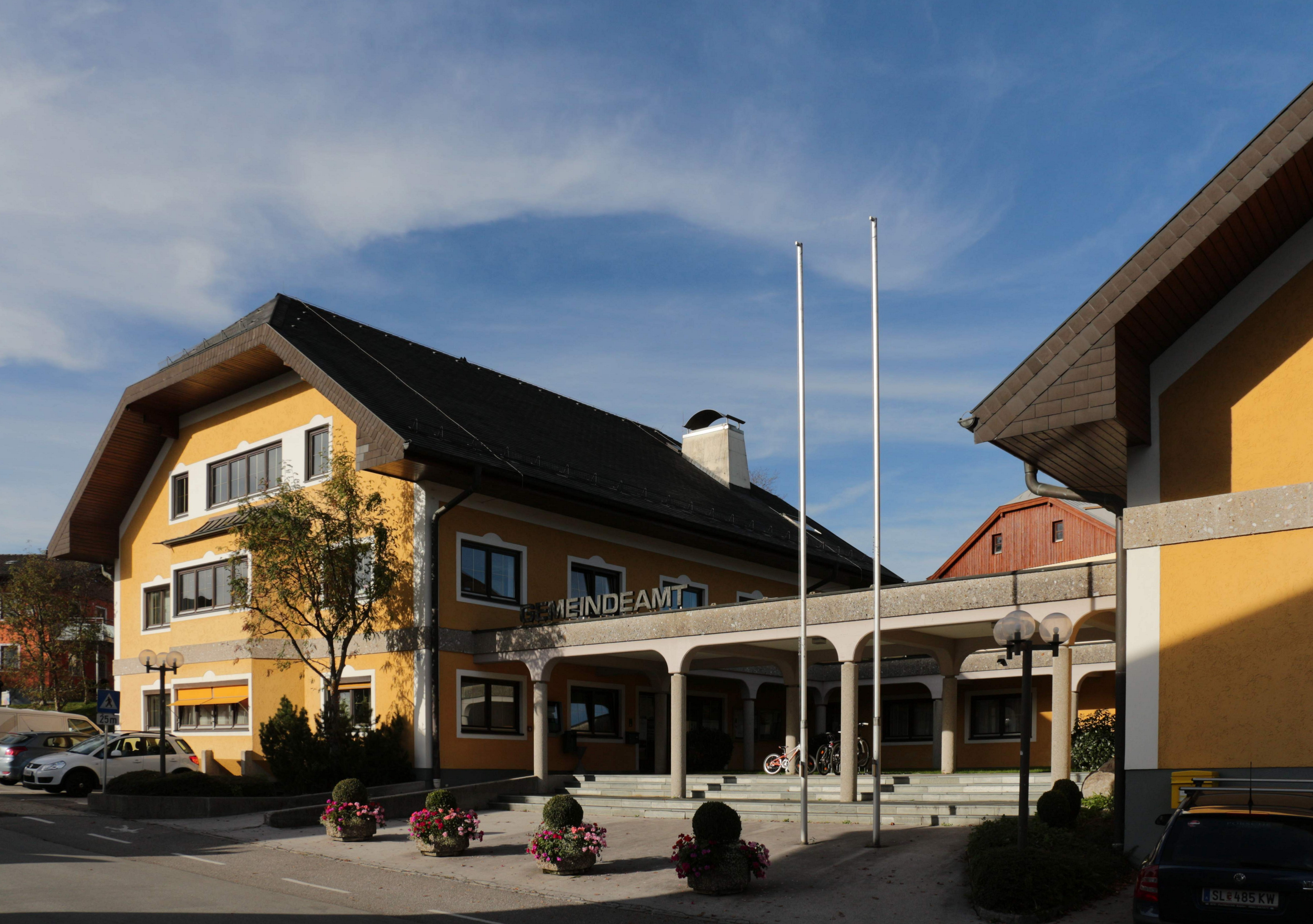
- Municipal office

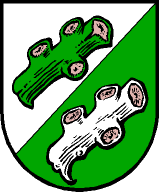
- Coat of arms

- Location within Austria
- Coordinates: 47°51′00″N 13°04′00″E
- Country: Austria
- State: Salzburg
- District: Salzburg-Umgebung

Government
  - Mayor: Johannes Ebner (ÖVP)

Area
  - Total: 13.12 km^{2} (5.07 sq mi)
- Elevation: 524 m (1,719 ft)

Population (2018-01-01)
  - Total: 4,189
  - Density: 319.3/km^{2} (826.9/sq mi)
- Time zone: UTC+1 (CET)
  - Summer (DST): UTC+2 (CEST)
- Postal code: 5300
- Area code: 0662
- Vehicle registration: SL
- Website: www.hallwang.salzburg.at

Hallwang is a municipality in the district of Salzburg-Umgebung in the state of Salzburg in Austria.
