= Nußdorf am Haunsberg =

- Municipality
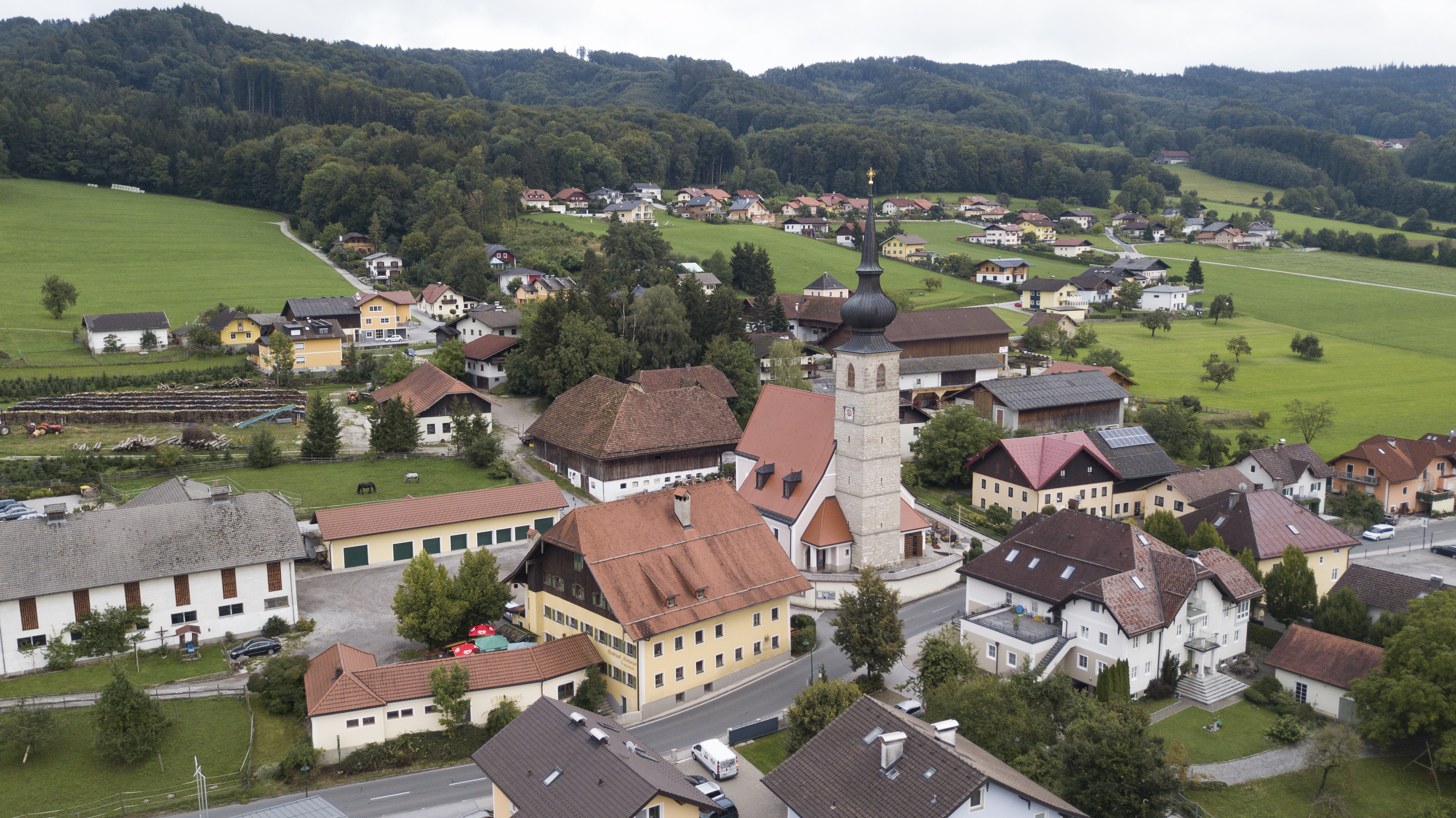
- Aerial view of Nußdorf

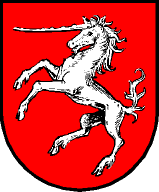
- Coat of arms

- Location within Austria
- Coordinates: 47°57′00″N 13°00′00″E
- Country: Austria
- State: Salzburg
- District: Salzburg-Umgebung

Government
  - Mayor: Johann Ganisl (ÖVP)

Area
  - Total: 35.54 km^{2} (13.72 sq mi)
- Elevation: 441 m (1,447 ft)

Population (2018-01-01)
  - Total: 2,383
  - Density: 67.05/km^{2} (173.7/sq mi)
- Time zone: UTC+1 (CET)
  - Summer (DST): UTC+2 (CEST)
- Postal code: 5151
- Area code: 06276
- Vehicle registration: SL
- Website: www.nussdorf.salzburg.at

Nußdorf am Haunsberg is a municipality in the district of Salzburg-Umgebung in the state of Salzburg in Austria.

== Geography ==
The municipality lies in the northern part of the Flachgau on the northwest side of the Haunsberg in the Oichten valley, about 20 km north of the city of Salzburg.
