= Berndorf bei Salzburg =

- Municipality
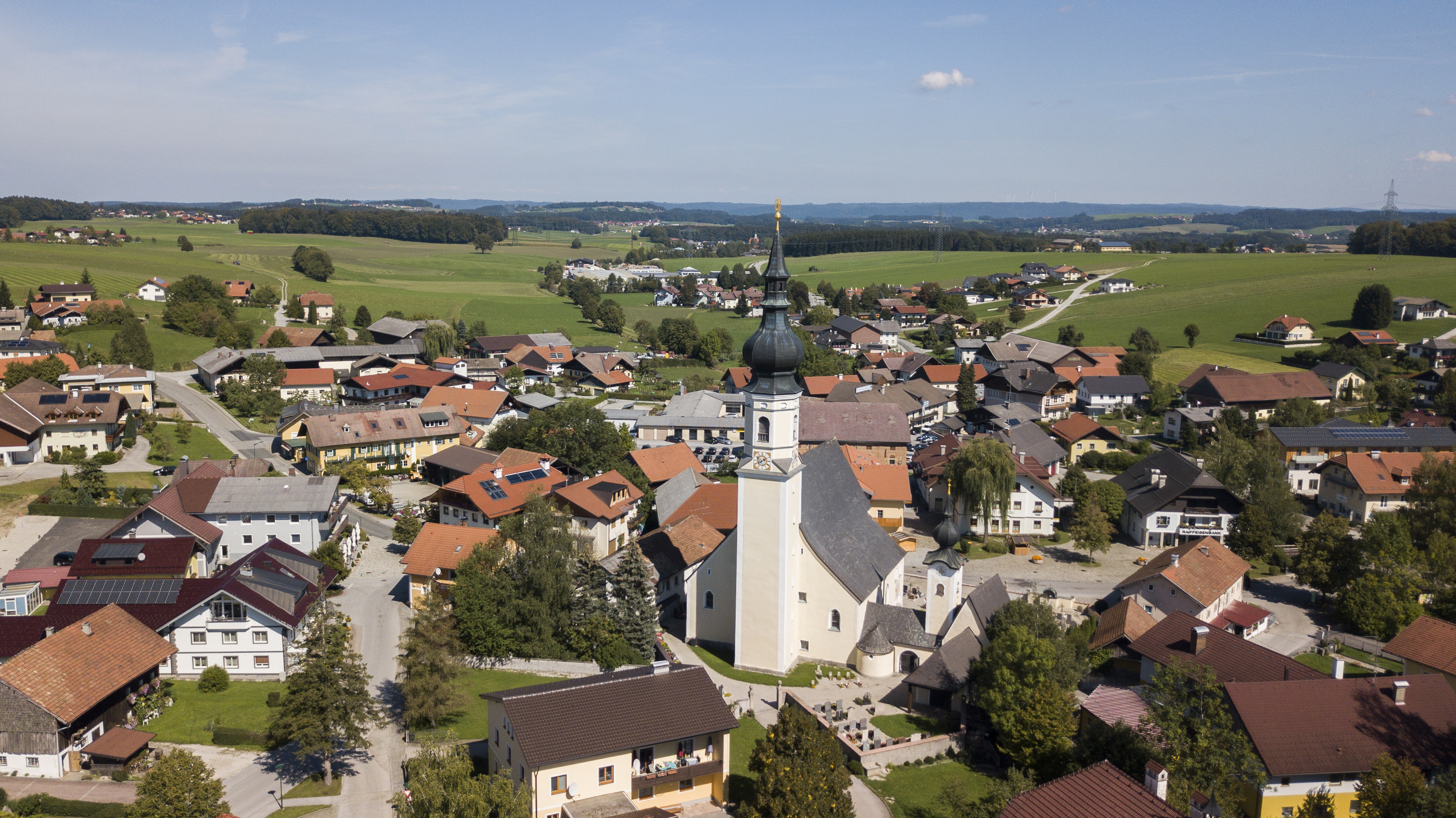
- Berndorf bei Salzburg (2018)

- Flag Coat of arms

- Location within Austria
- Coordinates: 47°58′00″N 13°04′00″E
- Country: Austria
- State: Salzburg
- District: Salzburg-Umgebung

Government
  - Mayor: Josef Guggenberger (ÖVP)

Area
  - Total: 14.48 km^{2} (5.59 sq mi)
- Elevation: 548 m (1,798 ft)

Population (2018-01-01)
  - Total: 1,689
  - Density: 116.6/km^{2} (302.1/sq mi)
- Time zone: UTC+1 (CET)
  - Summer (DST): UTC+2 (CEST)
- Postal code: 5165
- Area code: 06217
- Vehicle registration: SL
- Website: www.berndorf.salzburg.at

Berndorf is a municipality in the district of Salzburg-Umgebung in the state of Salzburg in Austria.

== Geography ==
The municipality lies in the northeast of the district of Salzburg-Umgebung. The Grabensee lies entirely within the municipality. Katastralgemeinden are: Berndorf bei Salzburg and Großenegg. Through the municipality flows the Reiter Bach, which flows into the river Mattig, a tributary of the Inn. Other creeks are the Egger Bach and the Schwandlbach, which are tributaries of the Reiter Bach.

== See also ==
- Salzburg
- Salzburgerland
