= Thalgau =

- Municipality
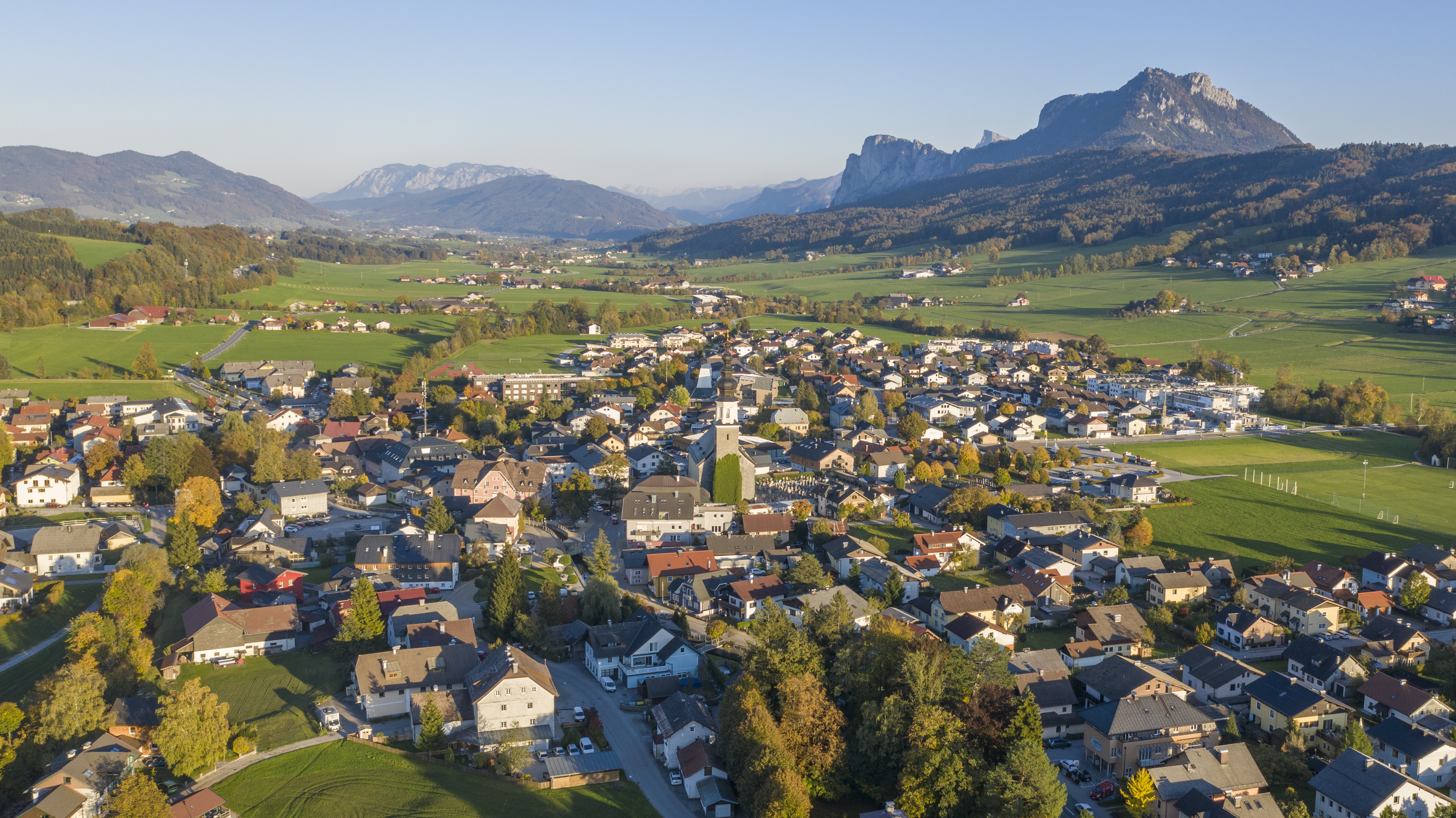

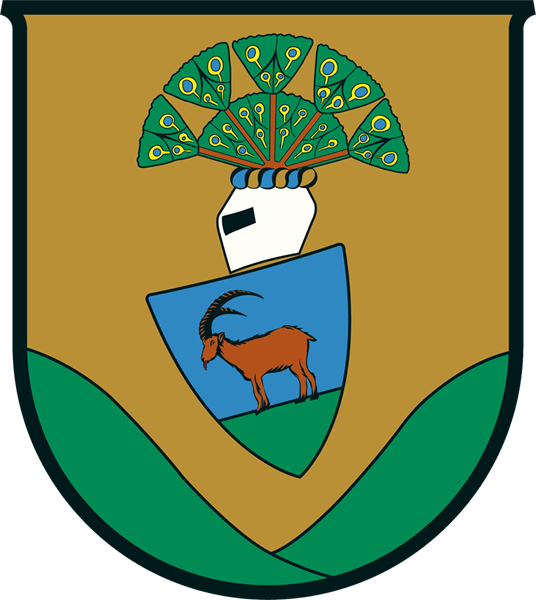
- Coat of arms

- Location within Austria
- Coordinates: 47°50′00″N 13°15′00″E
- Country: Austria
- State: Salzburg
- District: Salzburg-Umgebung

Government
  - Mayor: Martin Greisberger (ÖVP)

Area
  - Total: 48.16 km^{2} (18.59 sq mi)
- Elevation: 545 m (1,788 ft)

Population (2018-01-01)
  - Total: 5,931
  - Density: 123.2/km^{2} (319.0/sq mi)
- Time zone: UTC+1 (CET)
  - Summer (DST): UTC+2 (CEST)
- Postal code: 5303
- Area code: 06235
- Vehicle registration: SL
- Website: www.thalgau.at

Thalgau is a market town in the district of Salzburg-Umgebung in the state of Salzburg in Austria.

== Geography ==
Thalgau lies 18 kilometres (11 mi) east of the city of Salzburg. It is a central spot in the eastern Flachgau.

== Economy ==
Sony DADC, a Sony-owned optical disc manufacturing plant established in 1987, operates in Thalgau. In 2016, Lechner Racing opened its new headquarters in Thalgau. Red Bull operates a Red Bull Athlete Performance Center in Thalgau.
