= Neumarkt am Wallersee =

- Municipality
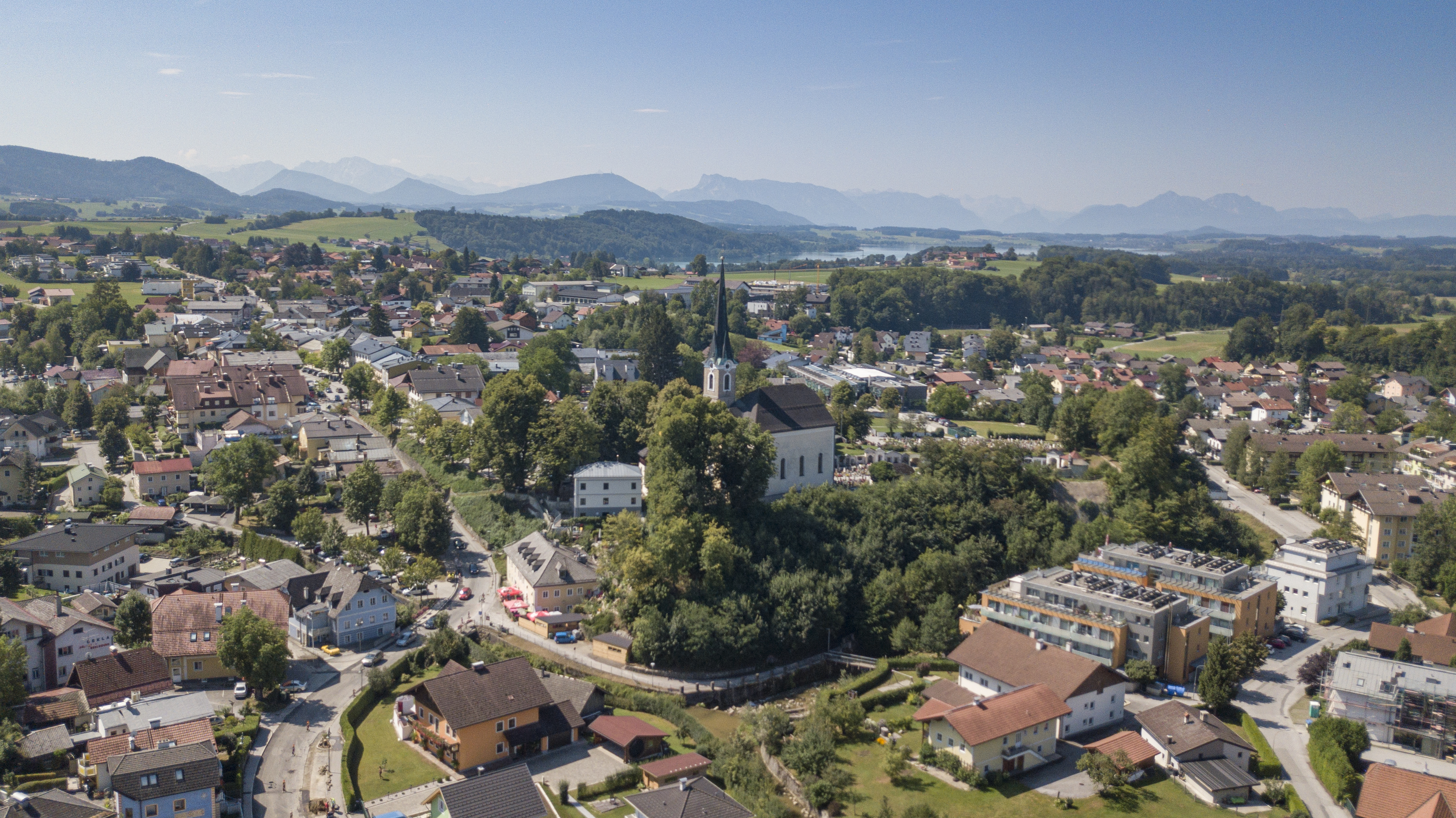

- Flag Coat of arms

- Location within Austria
- Coordinates: 47°56′43″N 13°13′29″E
- Country: Austria
- State: Salzburg
- District: Salzburg-Umgebung

Government
  - Mayor: Adolf Rieger (ÖVP)

Area
  - Total: 36.26 km^{2} (14.00 sq mi)
- Elevation: 552 m (1,811 ft)

Population (2018-01-01)
  - Total: 6,297
  - Density: 173.7/km^{2} (449.8/sq mi)
- Time zone: UTC+1 (CET)
  - Summer (DST): UTC+2 (CEST)
- Postal code: 5202
- Area code: 06216
- Vehicle registration: SL
- Website: www.neumarkt.at

Neumarkt am Wallersee is a town in the district of Salzburg-Umgebung in the state of Salzburg in Austria.

== Origins ==
The origins of the city are in 1240, with the Archbishop Erberhard II of Salzburg.

== Population ==
Neumarkt am Wallersee has a population of 5,651 inhabitants.

== Politics ==
The city council has 25 members:

- 11 ÖVP
- 8 SPÖ
- 3 Grüne
- 3 FPÖ

Mayor is Emmerich Karl Riesner (ÖVP).

== Equipments ==
- Höhere Bundeslehranstalt für wirtschaftliche Berufe
- Handelsakademie
- Handelsschule
- Fachschule
- Polytechnische Schule
- Hauptschule
- Volksschulen

== History ==
During the Napoleonic Wars, in December 1800, Neumarkt am Wallersee was the scene of a military action between the Austrian Army, fleeing after its major defeat in the Battle of Hohenlinden, and the pursuing French Army. The Austrians fared badly in this as in other engagements of this campaign.

== See also ==
- Salzburg
- Salzburgerland
