= Mattsee =

- Municipality
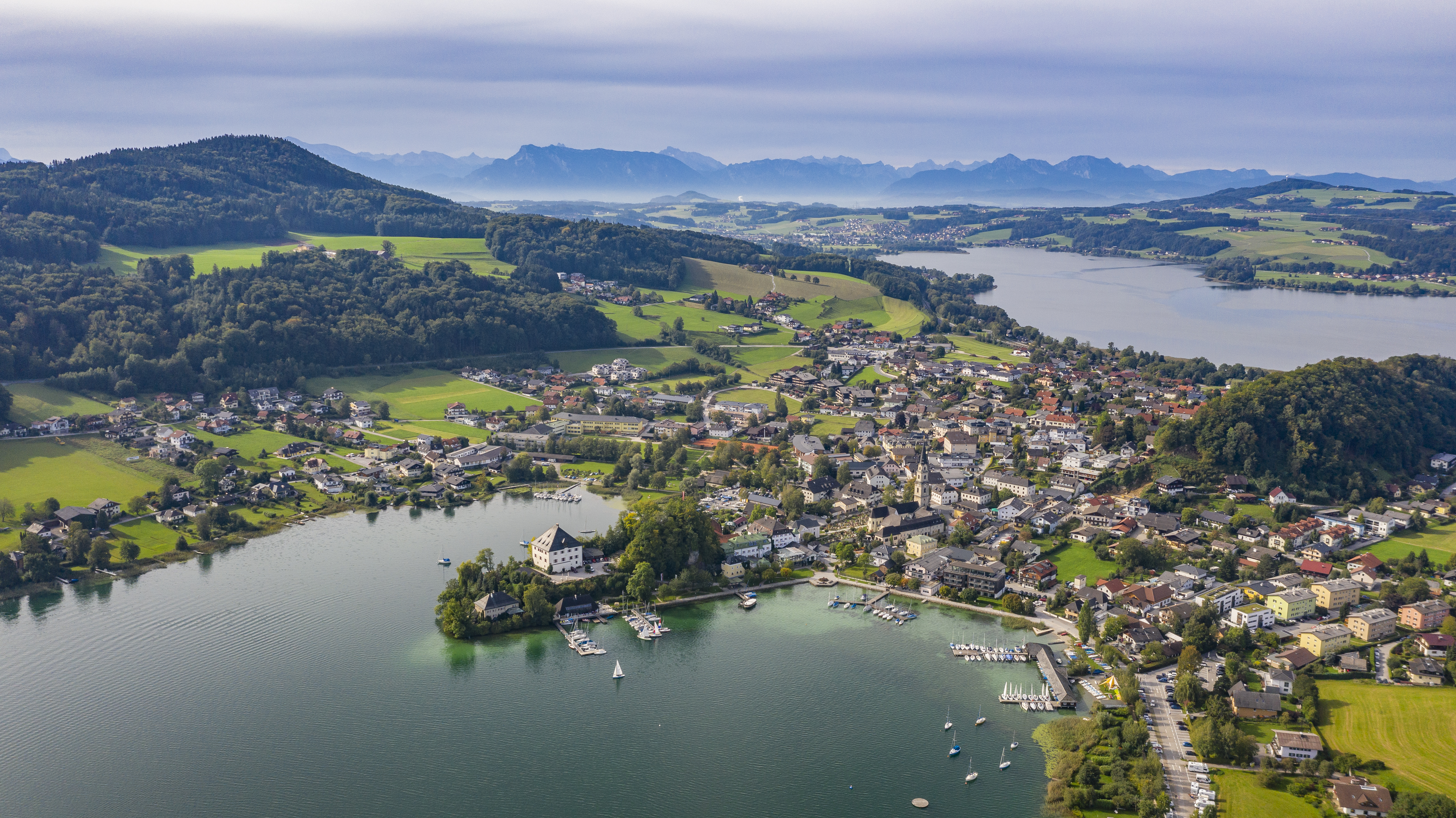
- View from the lake: castle and church

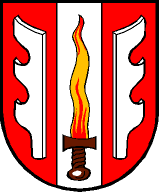
- Coat of arms

- Location within Austria
- Coordinates: 47°58′00″N 13°05′00″E
- Country: Austria
- State: Salzburg
- District: Salzburg-Umgebung

Government
  - Mayor: Michael Schwarzmayr (SPÖ)

Area
  - Total: 24.59 km^{2} (9.49 sq mi)
- Elevation: 505 m (1,657 ft)

Population (2018-01-01)
  - Total: 3,263
  - Density: 132.7/km^{2} (343.7/sq mi)
- Time zone: UTC+1 (CET)
  - Summer (DST): UTC+2 (CEST)
- Postal code: 5163
- Area code: 06217
- Vehicle registration: SL
- Website: www.mattsee.at

Mattsee is a market town at the eponymous lake in the district of Salzburg-Umgebung in the Austrian state of Salzburg.

== History ==
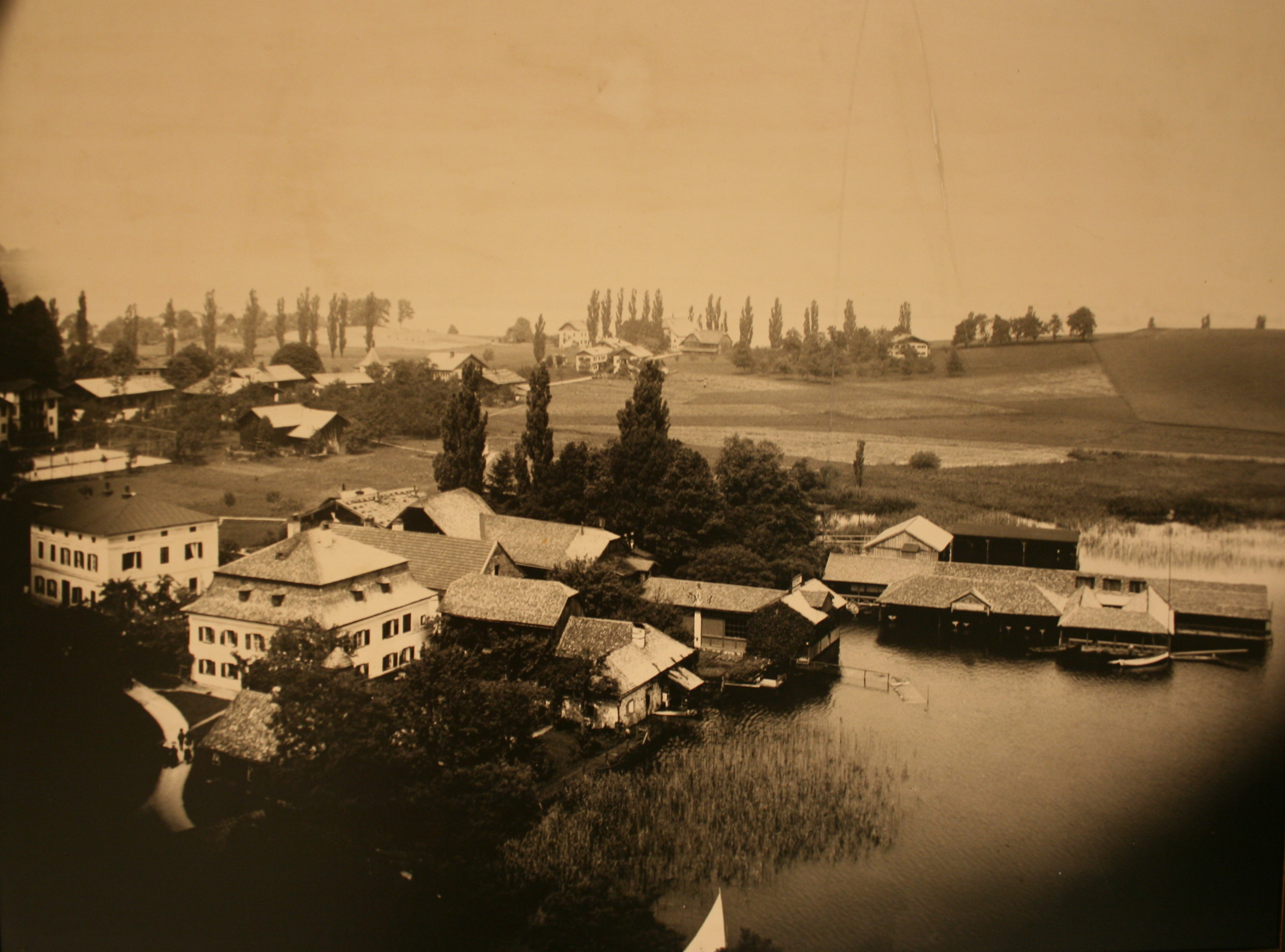
Mattsee in 1905

In ca. 765, Duke Tassilo III of Bavaria established the Mattsee Benedictine Abbey, which became a part of the Diocese of Passau in 993 and was transformed into a college of canons. The Bishops of Passau had the Mattsee Castle built in the 12th century.

Under the jurisdiction of the Archdiocese of Salzburg, the college has existed since 1807. The abbey church, a Gothic building, has a Baroque equipment and a prominent 60m/197 ft high steeple added in 1766. Adjacent is a museum showing paintings of Johann Michael Rottmayr, an astronomical clock, and an 860 grant deed by King Louis the German.

== Lake ==
The lake's water has a reputation of being of excellent quality, being fed by underground springs.

== Cultural places ==
The fahr(T)raum museum exhibits the car collection of Ernst Piëch, grandson of Ferdinand Porsche.

== Notable people ==
- Anton Diabelli, composer, born in Mattsee on September 6, 1781, died on April 8, 1858, in Vienna
- Dorothea Seyss-Inquart, daughter of Arthur Seyss-Inquart (born 7 May 1928, died 3 May 2026, Mattsee, Upper Austria).

== Twin town ==
- Bühl (Germany, since 1972)
