= Schwarzach im Pongau =

- Municipality
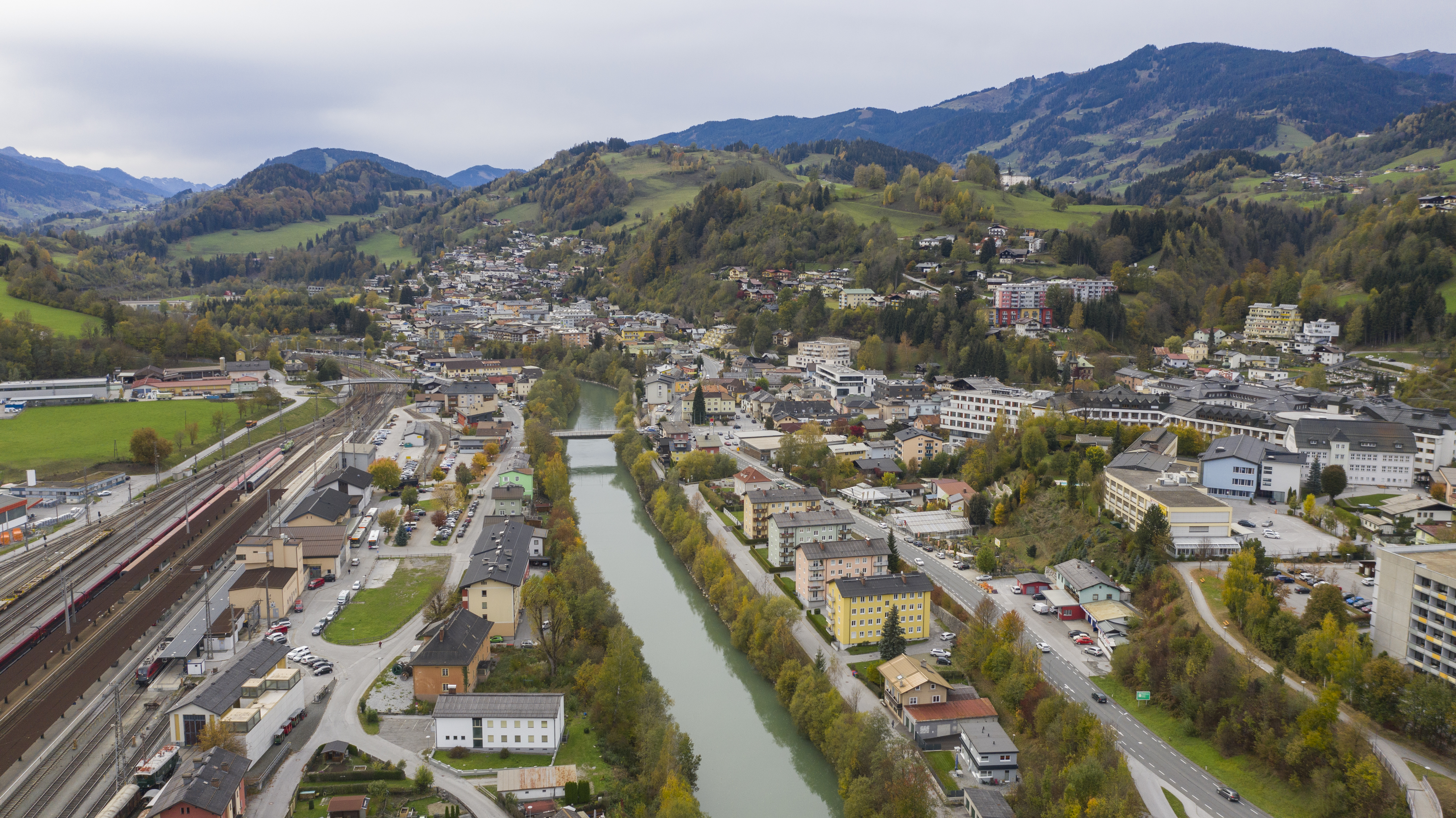
- Schwarzach im Pongau

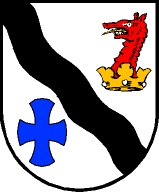
- Coat of arms

- Location within Salzburg Land Location within Austria
- Coordinates: 47°19′20″N 13°9′0″E
- Country: Austria
- State: Salzburg
- District: St. Johann im Pongau

Government
  - Mayor: Andreas Haitzer (SPÖ)

Area
  - Total: 3.2 km^{2} (1.2 sq mi)
- Elevation: 601 m (1,972 ft)

Population (2018-01-01)
  - Total: 3,515
  - Density: 1,100/km^{2} (2,800/sq mi)
- Time zone: UTC+1 (CET)
  - Summer (DST): UTC+2 (CEST)
- Postal code: 5620
- Area code: 06415
- Vehicle registration: JO
- Website: www.gde-schwarzach.salzburg.at

Schwarzach im Pongau is a market town in the St. Johann im Pongau District in the Austrian state of Salzburg.

== Geography ==
It is located in the valley of the Salzach river, between the Hohe Tauern mountain range (Goldberg and Ankogel groups) in the south and the Salzburg Slate Alps in the north. The municipal area is quite small, enclosed by the neighbouring municipalities of Sankt Veit and Goldegg.

== History ==
Schwarzach in the Archbishopric of Salzburg was first mentioned in a 1074 deed. Schernberg Castle west of the town centre, a 12th-century fortress, was purchased by Archbishop Friedrich von Schwarzenberg in 1845 and turned into the site of a brewery (Brauerei Schwarzach). Soon after, the business was relocated to Schwarzach centre and the castle was converted into a charitable mental hospital run by the Daughters of Charity. During the Austrian Anschluss to Nazi Germany from 1938 to 1945, the Daughters fought against compulsory sterilization and the Action T4 "euthanasia" programme, but could not save their patients.

In 1875, Schwarzach received access to the Salzburg-Tyrol Railway line (Giselabahn), running from the city of Salzburg through the Salzach valley to Wörgl in Tyrol, which decisively promoted the local economy. With the opening of the Tauern Railway across the Central Eastern Alps to Spittal an der Drau in Carinthia, the station became an important railway junction. Schwarzach was split off the Sankt Veit municipality in 1906 and received market rights two years later.

== Notable people ==
- The author Thomas Bernhard (1931–1989), suffering from tuberculosis had to spend much time in the area as a patient at the sanatorium in nearby Sankt Veit. He made Schwarzach the setting of his first novel Frost published in 1963.
- Adolf Krischanitz (born 1946), architect
- Patrick Reiter (born 1972), retired judoka
- Stefan Obermaier (born 1981), musician
- Iris Strubegger (born 1984), fashion model
- Andrea Fischbacher (born 1985), alpine skier, Olympic champion
- Michaela Kirchgasser (born 1985), alpine skier
- Marco Salvatore (born 1986), football player
- Giuliana Olmos (born 1993), Mexican tennis player (born in Schwarzach im Pongau)
- Stefan Kraft (born 1993), ski jumper, 2022 Olympic champion
- Jan Hörl (born 1998), ski jumper, 2022 Olympic champion
