= Lungau-Pinzgau-Pongau (National Council electoral district) =

Parliamentary electoral district in Austria

- Electoral District for the National Council
- Location of Lungau-Pinzgau-Pongau within Austria
- District: List: St. Johann im Pongau; Tamsweg; Zell am See
- State: Salzburg
- Population: 193,808 (2024)
- Electorate: 138,659 (2019)
- Area: 5,416 km^{2} (2023)

Current Electoral District
- Created: 1994
- Seats: 4 (1994–present)
- Members: List: Franz Eßl (ÖVP); Carina Reiter (ÖVP)

Lungau-Pinzgau-Pongau, also known as Electoral District 5C (German: Wahlkreis 5C), is one of the 39 multi-member regional electoral districts of the National Council, the lower house of the Austrian Parliament, the national legislature of Austria. The electoral district was created in 1992 when electoral regulations were amended to add regional electoral districts to the existing state-wide electoral districts and came into being at the following legislative election in 1994. It consists of the districts of St. Johann im Pongau, Tamsweg and Zell am See in the state of Salzburg. The electoral district currently elects four of the 183 members of the National Council using the open party-list proportional representation electoral system. At the 2019 legislative election the constituency had 138,659 registered electors.

== History ==
Lungau-Pinzgau-Pongau was one 43 regional electoral districts (regionalwahlkreise) established by the "National Council Electoral Regulations 1992" (Nationalrats-Wahlordnung 1992) passed by the National Council in 1992. It consisted of the districts of St. Johann im Pongau, Tamsweg and Zell am See in the state of Salzburg. The district was initially allocated four seats in May 1993.

== Electoral system ==
Lungau-Pinzgau-Pongau currently elects four of the 183 members of the National Council using the open party-list proportional representation electoral system. The allocation of seats is carried out in three stages. In the first stage, seats are allocated to parties (lists) at the regional level using a state-wide Hare quota (wahlzahl) (valid votes in the state divided by the number of seats in the state). In the second stage, seats are allocated to parties at the state/provincial level using the state-wide Hare quota (any seats won by the party at the regional stage are subtracted from the party's state seats). In the third and final stage, seats are allocated to parties at the federal/national level using the D'Hondt method (any seats won by the party at the regional and state stages are subtracted from the party's federal seats). Only parties that reach the 4% national threshold, or have won a seat at the regional stage, compete for seats at the state and federal stages.

Electors may cast one preferential vote for individual candidates at the regional, state and federal levels. Split-ticket voting (panachage), or voting for more than one candidate at each level, is not permitted and will result in the ballot paper being invalidated. At the regional level, candidates must receive preferential votes amounting to at least 14% of the valid votes cast for their party to over-ride the order of the party list (10% and 7% respectively for the state and federal levels). Prior to April 2013 electors could not cast preferential votes at the federal level and the thresholds candidates needed to over-ride the party list order were higher at the regional level (half the Hare quota or 1/6 of the party votes) and state level (Hare quota).

== Election results ==
=== Summary ===
Election	Communists KPÖ+ / KPÖ			Social Democrats SPÖ			Greens GRÜNE			NEOS NEOS / LiF			People's ÖVP			Freedom FPÖ		
Election	Votes	%	Seats	Votes	%	Seats	Votes	%	Seats	Votes	%	Seats	Votes	%	Seats	Votes	%	Seats
2019	320	0.30%	0	18,673	17.59%	0	7,830	7.38%	0	7,192	6.78%	0	54,372	51.22%	2	16,372	15.42%	0
2017	301	0.27%	0	24,968	22.22%	0	2,394	2.13%	0	5,027	4.47%	0	44,320	39.44%	1	30,650	27.27%	1
2013	347	0.33%	0	27,055	25.94%	1	9,774	9.37%	0	3,506	3.36%	0	29,537	28.32%	1	24,955	23.93%	0
2008	388	0.36%	0	29,720	27.23%	1	7,408	6.79%	0	890	0.82%	0	33,128	30.36%	1	19,866	18.20%	0
2006	519	0.50%	0	33,868	32.88%	1	7,456	7.24%	0				42,156	40.93%	1	12,328	11.97%	0
2002	342	0.32%	0	36,514	33.84%	1	6,819	6.32%	0	863	0.80%	0	51,741	47.95%	1	11,627	10.78%	0
1999	204	0.20%	0	33,085	32.58%	1	5,577	5.49%	0	2,216	2.18%	0	30,136	29.67%	1	29,324	28.87%	1
1995	141	0.13%	0	37,792	36.17%	1	3,877	3.71%	0	4,204	4.02%	0	31,644	30.28%	1	25,850	24.74%	0
1994				35,803	36.21%	1	5,410	5.47%	0	3,940	3.99%	0	30,330	30.68%	1	22,142	22.40%	0

=== Detailed ===
==== 2010s ====
===== 2019 =====
Results of the 2019 legislative election held on 29 September 2019:

Party		Votes per district				Total votes	%	Seats
Party		St. Johann im Pongau	Tams- weg	Zell am See	Voting card	Total votes	%	Seats
Austrian People's Party	ÖVP	22,991	6,454	24,835	92	54,372	51.22%	2
Social Democratic Party of Austria	SPÖ	8,273	1,820	8,549	31	18,673	17.59%	0
Freedom Party of Austria	FPÖ	6,953	2,496	6,887	36	16,372	15.42%	0
The Greens – The Green Alternative	GRÜNE	3,150	730	3,877	73	7,830	7.38%	0
NEOS – The New Austria and Liberal Forum	NEOS	2,950	700	3,493	49	7,192	6.78%	0
JETZT	JETZT	423	105	521	4	1,053	0.99%	0
Der Wandel	WANDL	130	43	166	3	342	0.32%	0
KPÖ Plus	KPÖ+	154	36	129	1	320	0.30%	0
Valid Votes		45,024	12,384	48,457	289	106,154	100.00%	2
Rejected Votes		681	164	674	3	1,522	1.41%	
Total Polled		45,705	12,548	49,131	292	107,676	77.66%	
Registered Electors		58,389	16,110	64,160		138,659		
Turnout		78.28%	77.89%	76.58%		77.66%		

The following candidates were elected:

- Party mandates - Franz Eßl (ÖVP), 3,942 votes; and Carina Reiter (ÖVP), 1,616 votes.

===== 2017 =====
Results of the 2017 legislative election held on 15 October 2017:

Party		Votes per district				Total votes	%	Seats
Party		St. Johann im Pongau	Tams- weg	Zell am See	Voting card	Total votes	%	Seats
Austrian People's Party	ÖVP	18,818	5,261	20,084	157	44,320	39.44%	1
Freedom Party of Austria	FPÖ	13,015	4,266	13,301	68	30,650	27.27%	1
Social Democratic Party of Austria	SPÖ	10,897	2,384	11,596	91	24,968	22.22%	0
NEOS – The New Austria and Liberal Forum	NEOS	2,093	520	2,351	63	5,027	4.47%	0
Peter Pilz List	PILZ	1,029	258	1,242	34	2,563	2.28%	0
The Greens – The Green Alternative	GRÜNE	912	252	1,196	34	2,394	2.13%	0
Free List Austria	FLÖ	351	89	831	4	1,275	1.13%	0
My Vote Counts!	GILT	260	49	372	8	689	0.61%	0
Communist Party of Austria	KPÖ	127	30	137	7	301	0.27%	0
The Whites	WEIßE	87	25	87	1	200	0.18%	0
Valid Votes		47,589	13,134	51,197	467	112,387	100.00%	2
Rejected Votes		521	122	658	3	1,304	1.15%	
Total Polled		48,110	13,256	51,855	470	113,691	81.94%	
Registered Electors		58,311	16,222	64,216		138,749		
Turnout		82.51%	81.72%	80.75%		81.94%		

The following candidates were elected:

- Party mandates - Franz Eßl (ÖVP), 3,182 votes; and Christian Pewny (FPÖ), 2,317 votes.

===== 2013 =====
Results of the 2013 legislative election held on 29 September 2013:

Party		Votes per district				Total votes	%	Seats
Party		St. Johann im Pongau	Tams- weg	Zell am See	Voting card	Total votes	%	Seats
Austrian People's Party	ÖVP	12,511	4,180	12,761	85	29,537	28.32%	1
Social Democratic Party of Austria	SPÖ	11,555	2,775	12,686	39	27,055	25.94%	1
Freedom Party of Austria	FPÖ	10,927	3,111	10,877	40	24,955	23.93%	0
The Greens – The Green Alternative	GRÜNE	4,029	998	4,682	65	9,774	9.37%	0
Team Stronach	FRANK	2,194	579	2,722	17	5,512	5.28%	0
NEOS – The New Austria	NEOS	1,538	340	1,587	41	3,506	3.36%	0
Alliance for the Future of Austria	BZÖ	1,435	384	1,286	11	3,116	2.99%	0
Pirate Party of Austria	PIRAT	180	46	273	4	503	0.48%	0
Communist Party of Austria	KPÖ	135	47	162	3	347	0.33%	0
Valid Votes		44,504	12,460	47,036	305	104,305	100.00%	2
Rejected Votes		994	233	1,164	5	2,396	2.25%	
Total Polled		45,498	12,693	48,200	310	106,701	76.97%	
Registered Electors		58,236	16,319	64,064		138,619		
Turnout		78.13%	77.78%	75.24%		76.97%		

The following candidates were elected:

- Personal mandates - Franz Eßl (ÖVP), 5,222 votes.
- Party mandates - Walter Bacher (SPÖ), 2,846 votes.

==== 2000s ====
===== 2008 =====
Results of the 2008 legislative election held on 28 September 2008:

Party		Votes per district				Total votes	%	Seats
Party		St. Johann im Pongau	Tams- weg	Zell am See	Voting card	Total votes	%	Seats
Austrian People's Party	ÖVP	13,995	4,224	14,610	299	33,128	30.36%	1
Social Democratic Party of Austria	SPÖ	12,508	2,914	14,123	175	29,720	27.23%	1
Freedom Party of Austria	FPÖ	8,938	2,515	8,300	113	19,866	18.20%	0
Alliance for the Future of Austria	BZÖ	5,902	2,059	6,210	102	14,273	13.08%	0
The Greens – The Green Alternative	GRÜNE	2,934	741	3,476	257	7,408	6.79%	0
Fritz Dinkhauser List – Citizens' Forum Tyrol	FRITZ	554	177	972	23	1,726	1.58%	0
The Christians	DC	508	112	311	14	945	0.87%	0
Liberal Forum	LiF	330	100	413	47	890	0.82%	0
Independent Citizens' Initiative Save Austria	RETTÖ	222	100	425	11	758	0.69%	0
Communist Party of Austria	KPÖ	141	43	197	7	388	0.36%	0
Left	LINKE	15	4	13	0	32	0.03%	0
Valid Votes		46,047	12,989	49,050	1,048	109,134	100.00%	2
Rejected Votes		1,244	272	1,376	11	2,903	2.59%	
Total Polled		47,291	13,261	50,426	1,059	112,037	81.17%	
Registered Electors		57,883	16,554	63,598		138,035		
Turnout		81.70%	80.11%	79.29%		81.17%		

The following candidates were elected:

- Party mandates - Franz Eßl (ÖVP), 4,315 votes; and Rosa Lohfeyer (SPÖ), 2,242 votes.

===== 2006 =====
Results of the 2006 legislative election held on 1 October 2006:

Party		Votes per district				Total votes	%	Seats
Party		St. Johann im Pongau	Tams- weg	Zell am See	Voting card	Total votes	%	Seats
Austrian People's Party	ÖVP	17,206	5,096	17,893	1,961	42,156	40.93%	1
Social Democratic Party of Austria	SPÖ	13,671	3,341	15,535	1,321	33,868	32.88%	1
Freedom Party of Austria	FPÖ	5,294	1,776	4,869	389	12,328	11.97%	0
The Greens – The Green Alternative	GRÜNE	2,637	628	3,262	929	7,456	7.24%	0
Hans-Peter Martin's List	MATIN	1,209	323	1,586	133	3,251	3.16%	0
Alliance for the Future of Austria	BZÖ	1,244	356	1,223	111	2,934	2.85%	0
Communist Party of Austria	KPÖ	210	59	221	29	519	0.50%	0
EU Withdrawal – Neutral Free Austria	NFÖ	172	63	241	15	491	0.48%	0
Valid Votes		41,643	11,642	44,830	4,888	103,003	100.00%	2
Rejected Votes		1,046	259	1,099	63	2,467	2.34%	
Total Polled		42,689	11,901	45,929	4,951	105,470	79.46%	
Registered Electors		55,477	16,002	61,253		132,732		
Turnout		76.95%	74.37%	74.98%		79.46%		

The following candidates were elected:

- Party mandates - Franz Eßl (ÖVP), 4,753 votes; and Erika Scharer (SPÖ), 5,085 votes.

Substitutions:

- Erika Scharer (SPÖ) resigned on 6 February 2007 and was replaced by Rosa Lohfeyer (SPÖ) on 7 February 2007.

===== 2002 =====
Results of the 2002 legislative election held on 24 November 2002:

Party		Votes per district				Total votes	%	Seats
Party		St. Johann im Pongau	Tams- weg	Zell am See	Voting card	Total votes	%	Seats
Austrian People's Party	ÖVP	20,974	6,354	22,098	2,315	51,741	47.95%	1
Social Democratic Party of Austria	SPÖ	15,098	3,536	16,861	1,019	36,514	33.84%	1
Freedom Party of Austria	FPÖ	4,605	1,698	4,967	357	11,627	10.78%	0
The Greens – The Green Alternative	GRÜNE	2,385	577	2,960	897	6,819	6.32%	0
Liberal Forum	LiF	289	86	433	55	863	0.80%	0
Communist Party of Austria	KPÖ	148	55	130	9	342	0.32%	0
Valid Votes		43,499	12,306	47,449	4,652	107,906	100.00%	2
Rejected Votes		757	175	841	32	1,805	1.65%	
Total Polled		44,256	12,481	48,290	4,684	109,711	85.90%	
Registered Electors		53,255	15,600	58,860		127,715		
Turnout		83.10%	80.01%	82.04%		85.90%		

The following candidates were elected:

- Party mandates - Franz Eßl (ÖVP), 6,116 votes; and Erika Scharer (SPÖ), 5,070 votes.

==== 1990s ====
===== 1999 =====
Results of the 1999 legislative election held on 3 October 1999:

Party		Votes per district				Total votes	%	Seats
Party		St. Johann im Pongau	Tams- weg	Zell am See	Voting card	Total votes	%	Seats
Social Democratic Party of Austria	SPÖ	13,387	3,168	15,323	1,207	33,085	32.58%	1
Austrian People's Party	ÖVP	12,405	3,944	12,423	1,364	30,136	29.67%	1
Freedom Party of Austria	FPÖ	11,755	3,623	12,812	1,134	29,324	28.87%	1
The Greens – The Green Alternative	GRÜNE	2,113	530	2,377	557	5,577	5.49%	0
Liberal Forum	LiF	682	196	946	392	2,216	2.18%	0
The Independents	DU	185	33	189	28	435	0.43%	0
Christian Voters Community	CWG	141	33	107	11	292	0.29%	0
No to NATO and EU – Neutral Austria Citizens' Initiative	NEIN	125	36	116	11	288	0.28%	0
Communist Party of Austria	KPÖ	89	26	71	18	204	0.20%	0
Valid Votes		40,882	11,589	44,364	4,722	101,557	100.00%	3
Rejected Votes		673	171	801	48	1,693	1.64%	
Total Polled		41,555	11,760	45,165	4,770	103,250	81.64%	
Registered Electors		52,692	15,577	58,195		126,464		
Turnout		78.86%	75.50%	77.61%		81.64%		

The following candidates were elected:

- Party mandates - Franz Hornegger (FPÖ), 1,898 votes; Georg Schwarzenberger (ÖVP), 3,264 votes; and Emmerich Schwemlein (SPÖ), 3,680 votes.

===== 1995 =====
Results of the 1995 legislative election held on 17 December 1995:

Party		Votes per district				Total votes	%	Seats
Party		St. Johann im Pongau	Tams- weg	Zell am See	Voting card	Total votes	%	Seats
Social Democratic Party of Austria	SPÖ	15,688	3,704	17,608	792	37,792	36.17%	1
Austrian People's Party	ÖVP	12,987	4,240	13,424	993	31,644	30.28%	1
Freedom Party of Austria	FPÖ	10,703	3,284	11,299	564	25,850	24.74%	0
Liberal Forum	LiF	1,444	339	1,943	478	4,204	4.02%	0
The Greens – The Green Alternative	GRÜNE	1,333	383	1,683	478	3,877	3.71%	0
No – Civic Action Group; Against the Sale of Austria	NEIN	427	116	407	34	984	0.94%	0
Communist Party of Austria	KPÖ	61	13	59	8	141	0.13%	0
Valid Votes		42,643	12,079	46,423	3,347	104,492	100.00%	2
Rejected Votes		985	236	1,087	29	2,337	2.19%	
Total Polled		43,628	12,315	47,510	3,376	106,829	86.50%	
Registered Electors		51,689	15,372	56,446		123,507		
Turnout		84.40%	80.11%	84.17%		86.50%		

The following candidates were elected:

- Party mandates - Georg Schwarzenberger (ÖVP), 2,183 votes; and Emmerich Schwemlein (SPÖ), 4,183 votes.

===== 1994 =====
Results of the 1994 legislative election held on 9 October 1994:

Party		Votes per district				Total votes	%	Seats
Party		St. Johann im Pongau	Tams- weg	Zell am See	Voting card	Total votes	%	Seats
Social Democratic Party of Austria	SPÖ	14,557	3,579	16,513	1,154	35,803	36.21%	1
Austrian People's Party	ÖVP	12,358	4,232	12,546	1,194	30,330	30.68%	1
Freedom Party of Austria	FPÖ	9,264	2,804	9,261	813	22,142	22.40%	0
The Greens – The Green Alternative	GRÜNE	2,026	551	2,208	625	5,410	5.47%	0
Liberal Forum	LiF	1,378	296	1,824	442	3,940	3.99%	0
No – Civic Action Group; Against the Sale of Austria	NEIN	306	73	361	32	772	0.78%	0
Christian Voters Community	CWG	152	42	147	25	366	0.37%	0
United Greens Austria – List Adi Pinter	VGÖ	43	5	51	7	106	0.11%	0
Valid Votes		40,084	11,582	42,911	4,292	98,869	100.00%	2
Rejected Votes		799	137	892	39	1,867	1.85%	
Total Polled		40,883	11,719	43,803	4,331	100,736	81.72%	
Registered Electors		51,622	15,386	56,269		123,277		
Turnout		79.20%	76.17%	77.85%		81.72%		

The following candidates were elected:

- Party mandates - Georg Schwarzenberger (ÖVP), 4,504 votes; and Emmerich Schwemlein (SPÖ), 4,130 votes.
