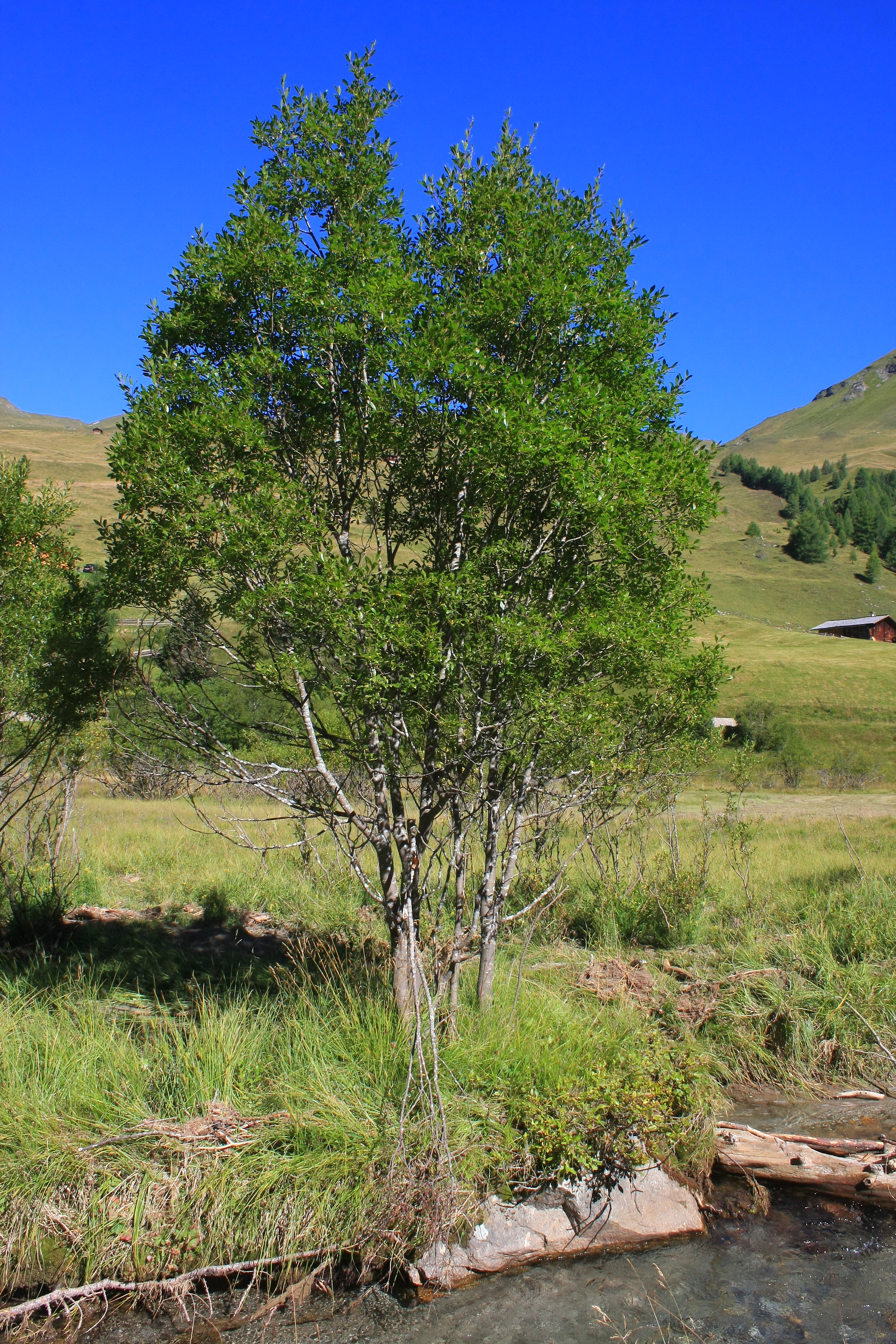

Conservation status
- Least Concern (IUCN 3.1)

Scientific classification
- Kingdom: Plantae
- Clade: Tracheophytes
- Clade: Angiosperms
- Clade: Eudicots
- Clade: Rosids
- Order: Malpighiales
- Family: Salicaceae
- Genus: Salix
- Species: S. mielichhoferi

Binomial name
- Salix mielichhoferi Saut.

= Salix mielichhoferi =

Plant in the genus of willows

Salix mielichhoferi, the Tauern willow, is a plant from the genus of willow (Salix). It occurs in the montane and subalpine altitudes in the crystalline central Alps of Italy and Austria.

== Vegetative characteristics ==
The Tauern willow is an upright shrub with a broad canopy and reaches heights of 1 to 4 m (3 ft 3 in to 13 ft 1 in). The bark of the branches is bare and shiny.

The leaves are divided into a petiole and a leaf blade. The petiole is 5 to 10 millimeters long and has no glands on top. The leaf blade is elliptic to oblong-elliptical to wide-inverted ovate-lanceolate at a length of 3 to 10 cm. It is green on both sides. When dried they are mostly black spots. The leaves are not frosted, they can only be indistinctly frosted on long shoots. The leaf veins protrude from the bare and shiny underside of the leaf.

== Generative characteristics ==
Flowering occurs between May and July before the leaves unfold.

== Chromosome set ==
In the Salix genus, the basic chromosome number is x = 19. The Tauern willow is mostly hexaploid and the chromosome number is usually 2n = 114. For Italian populations there are also reports for 2n = 152.

== Range ==
The Tauern willow occurs only in Italy and Austria.

In Austria, it occurs in the federal states of Upper Austria, Styria, Carinthia, Salzburg and Tyrol. The focus of the Austrian occurrence is in the Central Alps. The localities range from the Stubai Alps on the Tux and Zillertal Alps, the High and Low Tauern including Defereggengebirge, Kreuzeckgruppe, Nock, Koralpe, Saualpe and Seetal Alps to Stubalpe and the Seckau Alps. There are individual deposits in the northern Alps, for example on the Rofan, Hochkönig and Dachstein. In the Austrian Southern Alps, the Tauern willow occurs on the western edge of the Carnic Alps and in the Gailtal Alps.

In Styria and in Carinthia, the Tauern willow is completely protected, in Salzburg and Tyrol it is partially protected.

In Italy, the Tauern willow was found in the five provinces of Bozen (South Tyrol), Trento, Brescia, Belluno and Udine. Information from Switzerland for the Lower Engadine could not be confirmed.

The Tauern willow occurs in the montane to subalpine altitude range, in Austria at altitudes from 1300 to 2200 meters. The focus is on the subalpine level. There are also individual occurrences outside this altitude range, for example at Kals at 1250 meters and at the Großglockner High Alpine Road at 2300 meters. The main occurrences are in the green alder bush forest, in high-montane to subalpine willow bushes over silicate in alluvions and riverside pioneer locations of rivers.

== Taxonomy ==
Tauerngasleitung willow (Salix mielichhoferi) is connected to the black willow (Salix myrsinifolia) and is together with the latter in a Salix nigricans - aggregate provided.

Salix mielichhoferi was named by its first describer Anton Sauter after the Salzburg botanist Matthias Mielichhofer, who was the first to collect this species. The Locus classicus is the now dilapidated Schappachalm, southwest of Hüttschlag at around 1580 m above sea level, in the Ankogel group, Hohe Tauern, Salzburg.
