= Salzburg-Tyrol Railway =

Railway line in Austria

Coordinates: 47°29′30″N 12°03′40″E

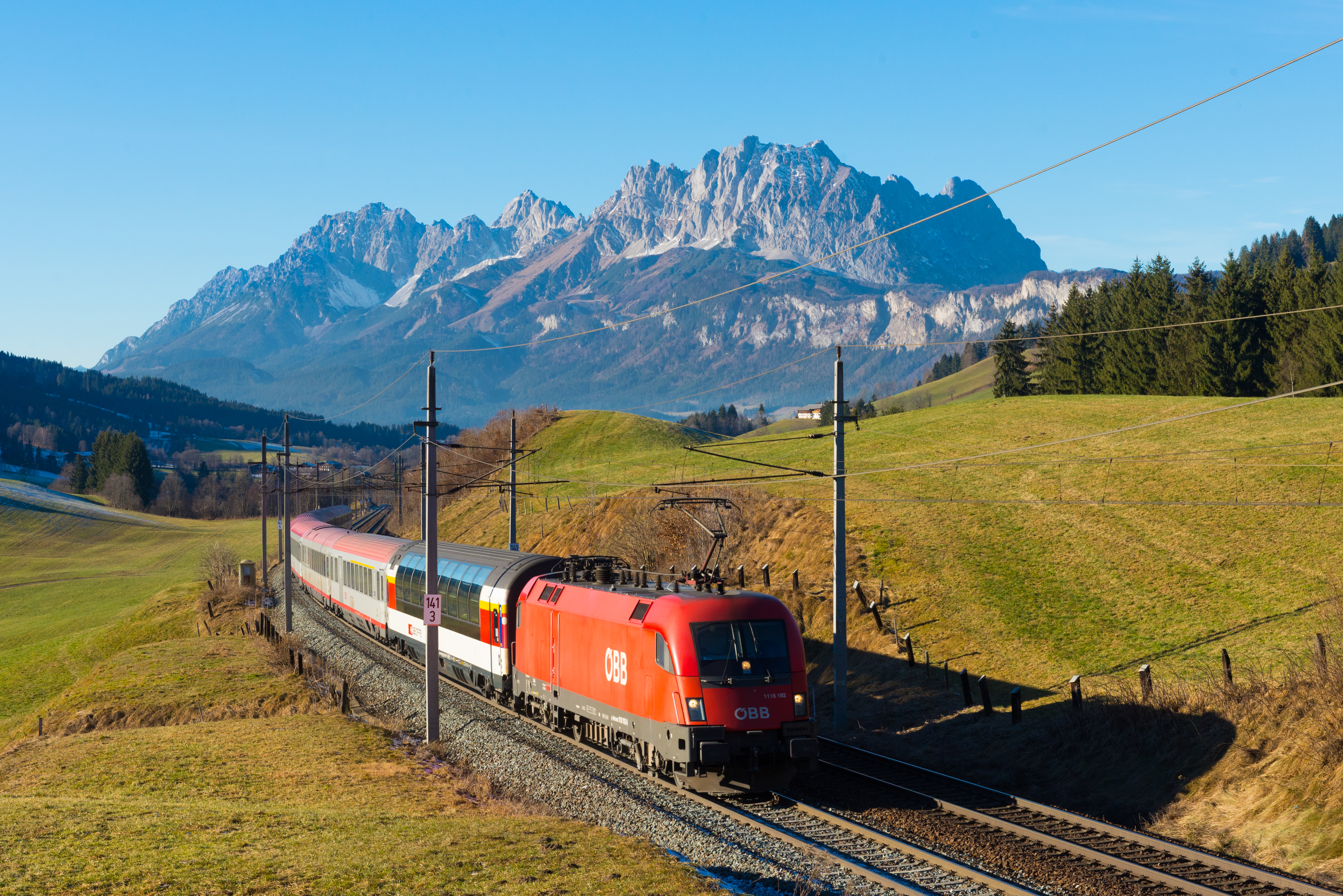
- EC 163 Transalpin passes the Kaiser Mountains.

Overview
- Native name: Salzburg-Tiroler-Bahn
- Status: Operational
- Owner: Austrian Federal Railways
- Line number: 101 03
- Locale: Salzburg; Tyrol
- Termini: Salzburg Hauptbahnhof; Wörgl Hauptbahnhof
- Stations: 55

Service
- Type: Heavy rail, Passenger/Freight rail Intercity rail, Regional rail, Commuter rail
- Route number: 200 (Freilassing – Saalfelden); 201 (Saalfelden - Innsbruck Hbf)
- Operator(s): Austrian Federal Railways

History
- Opened: Stages between 1873–1875

Technical
- Line length: 191.730 km (119.135 mi)
- Number of tracks: Double track
- Track gauge: 1,435 mm (4 ft 8 1/2 in) standard gauge
- Minimum radius: 200 m
- Electrification: 15 kV/16.7 Hz AC Overhead line
- Operating speed: 140 km/h (87 mph)
- Maximum incline: 2.6%

The Salzburg-Tyrol Railway (German: Salzburg-Tiroler-Bahn) is a main line railway in Austria. It runs through the states of Salzburg and Tyrol (North Tyrol) from the city of Salzburg to Wörgl and belongs to the core network (Kernnetz) of the Austrian Federal Railways (ÖBB). The section between Salzburg and Schwarzach-Sankt Veit is part of the Salzburg S-Bahn urban railway network.

== Course ==
The standard gauge line runs along the Salzach valley, the Bischofshofen hub being of particular importance as the junction with the Enns Valley Railway to Selzthal in Styria. At the Wörgl terminus, the Salzburg-Tyrol Railway meets the Lower Inn Valley Railway running from the Tyrolean capital Innsbruck to the German border at Kufstein and the Deutsches Eck transport link.

The line has been upgraded to double track throughout and both tracks may be worked in bi-directional running. The entire route is electrified and is powered by 15,000 Volt alternating current and a frequency of 16.7 Hertz. In particular the S-train section from Salzburg Hauptbahnhof to the southern branch-off of the Tauern Railway line at Schwarzach-St. Veit was given a major upgrade and, in places, entirely rebuilt and re-routed.

== Names ==
It is (and was) also known as the Gisela Railway (Giselabahn), after Archduchess Gisela of Austria, the second daughter of Emperor Franz Joseph I and his wife Elisabeth. Today it is frequently considered to be a continuation of the Western Railway from Vienna to Salzburg; the whole railway line from Wien Westbahnhof to Salzburg and Wörgl is also referred to as Empress Elisabeth Railway (Kaiserin-Elisabeth-Bahn). The westernmost Zell am See–Wörgl section in Tyrol is also called Brixental Railway.

== History ==
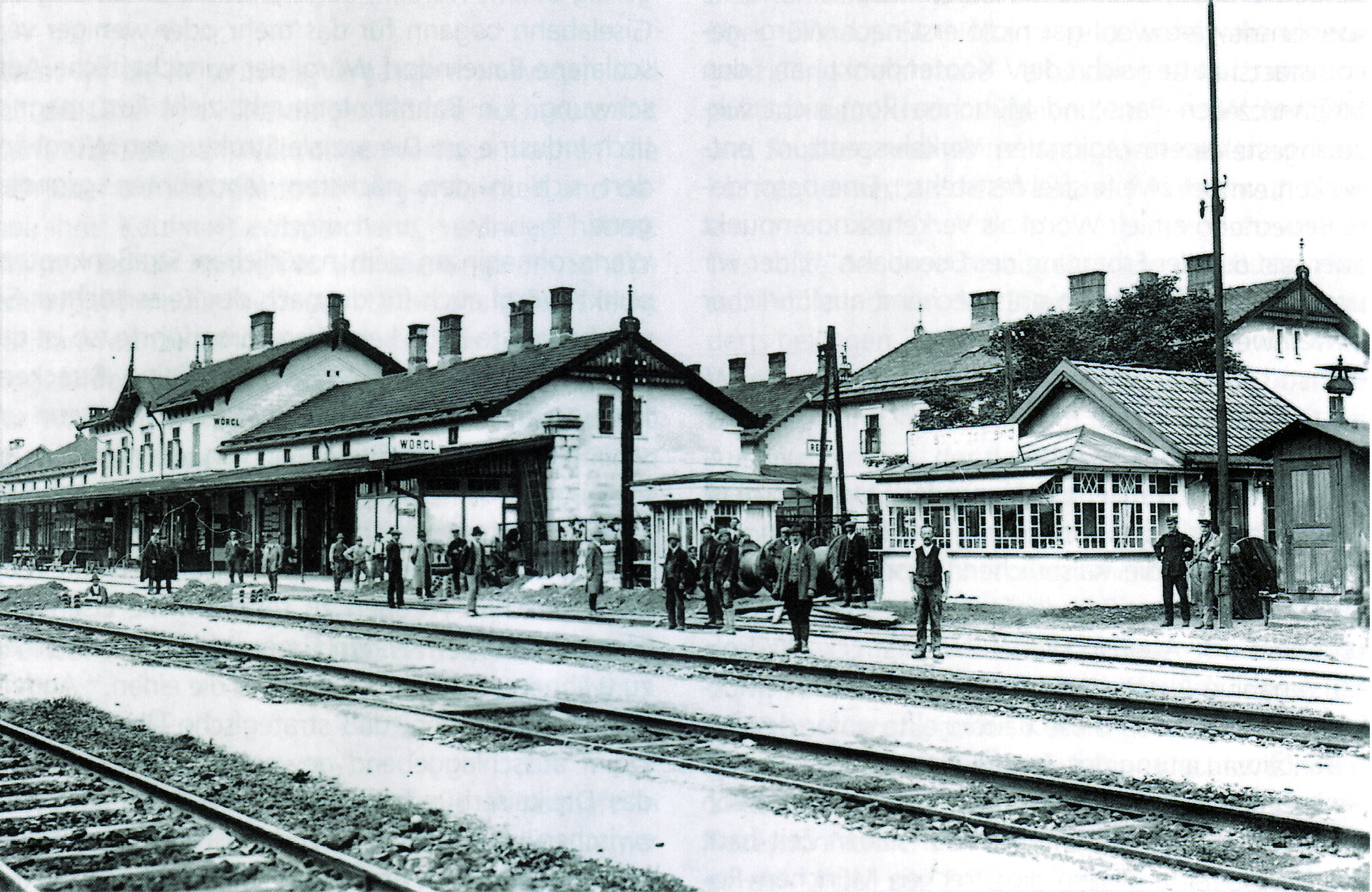
Wörgl Station, about 1900

The Salzburg-Tyrol Railway was built from 1873 to 1875 on the basis of the "Concession Authority dated 10 November 1872 for the Limited Company of the Privileged Empress Elisabeth Railway for the Construction and Operation of a Locomotive Railway Running from Upper Styria to Salzburg and North Tyrol". It runs from Salzburg via Hallein, Bischofshofen, St. Johann im Pongau, Schwarzach-St. Veit, Zell am See, Hochfilzen, St. Johann in Tirol and Kitzbühel to Wörgl.

The north ramp of the Tauern Railway, from Schwarzach-Sankt Veit station on the Salzburg-Tyrol Railway up to Bad Gastein, opened on 20 September 1905. The southern continuation across the main chain of the Alps to Spittal in the Drava Valley, including the Tauern Railway Tunnel, was inaugurated by Emperor Franz Joseph on 5 July 1909. By 1915 the Salzburg-Tyrol Railway was upgraded to double track and, in 1925, electrification of the line began, finished in 1930. Towards the end of World War II, the railway became a target for Allied bombing due to its strategic importance.

== Operation ==
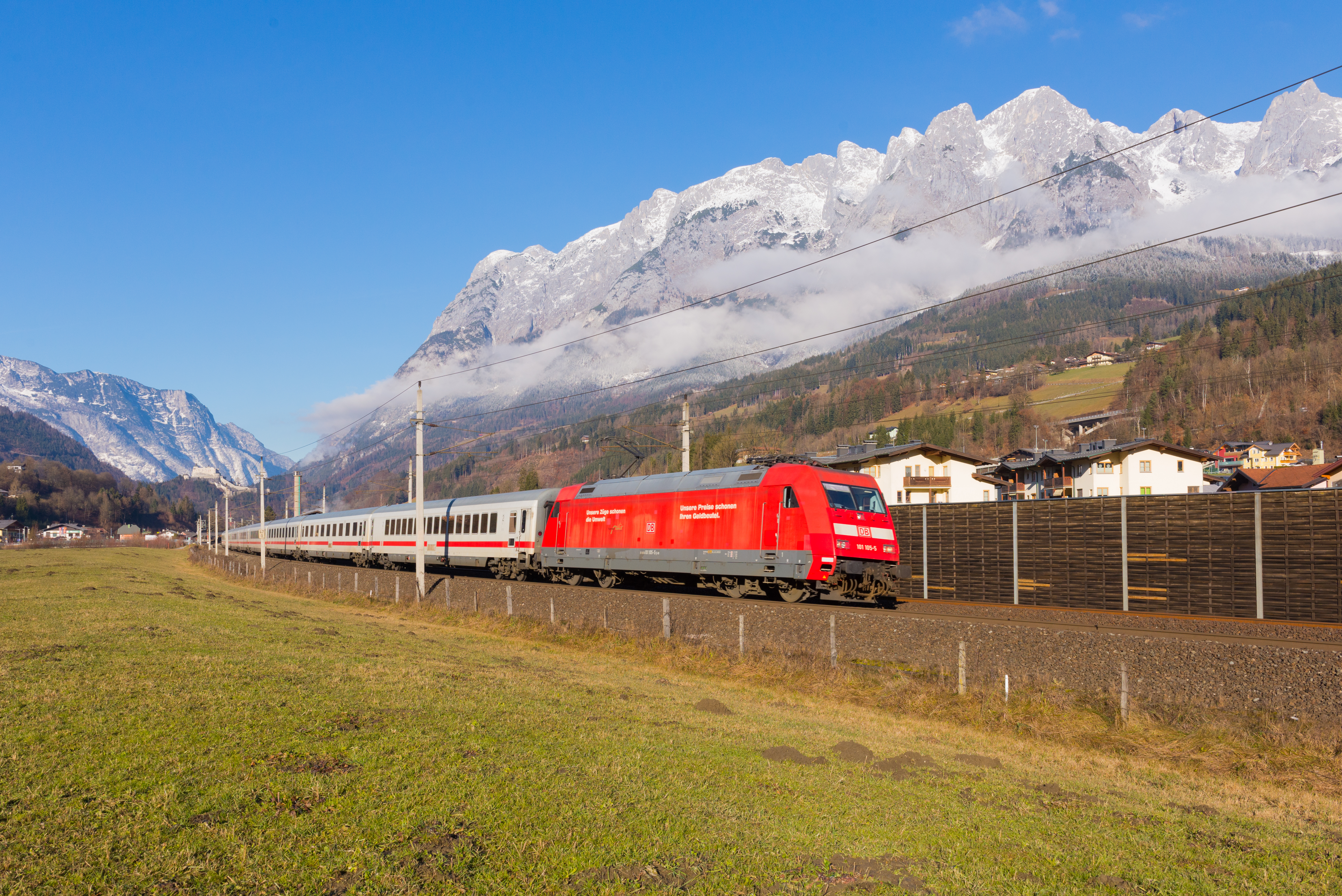
ÖBB EuroCity train near Pfarrwerfen.

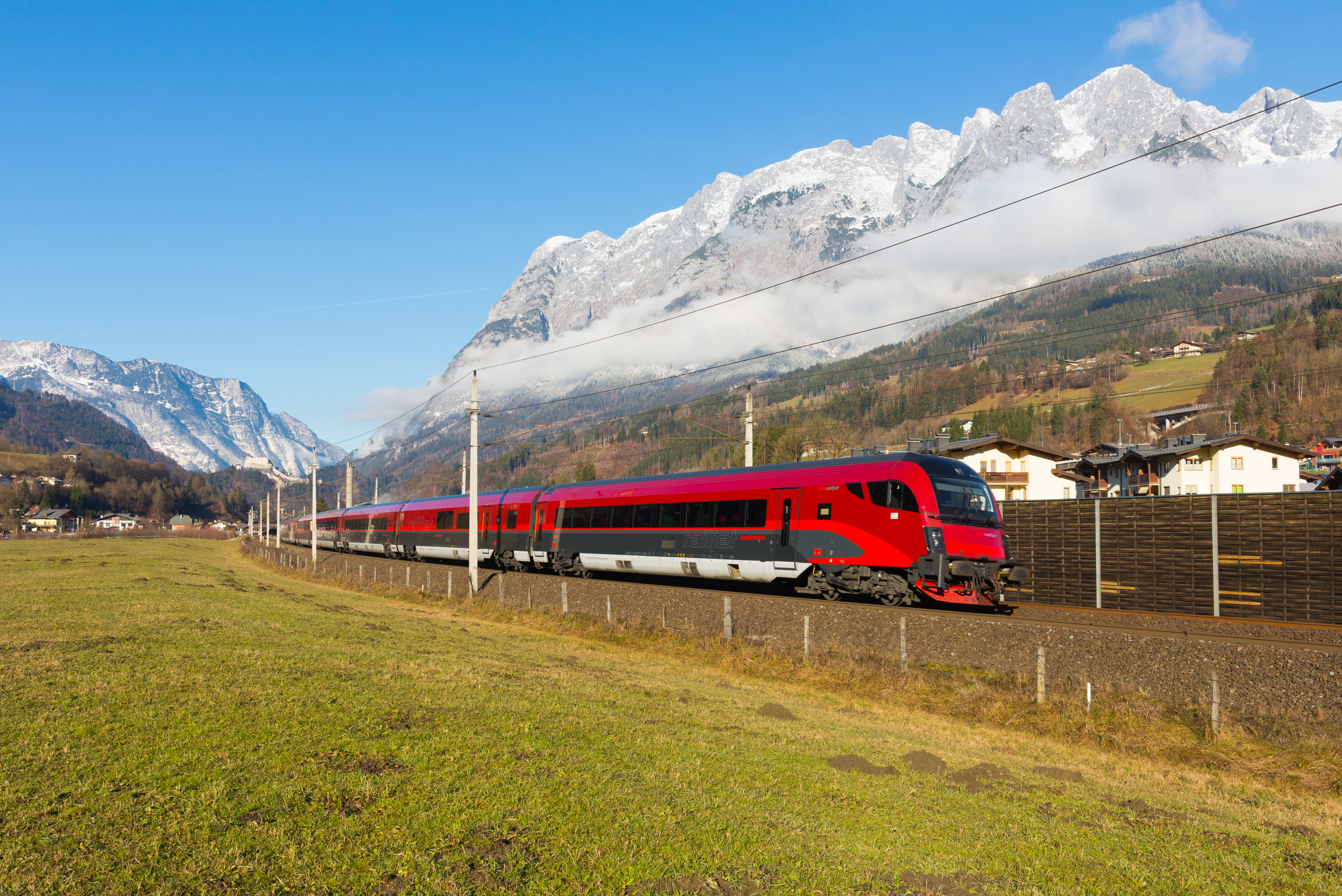
ÖBB Railjet train near Pfarrwerfen.

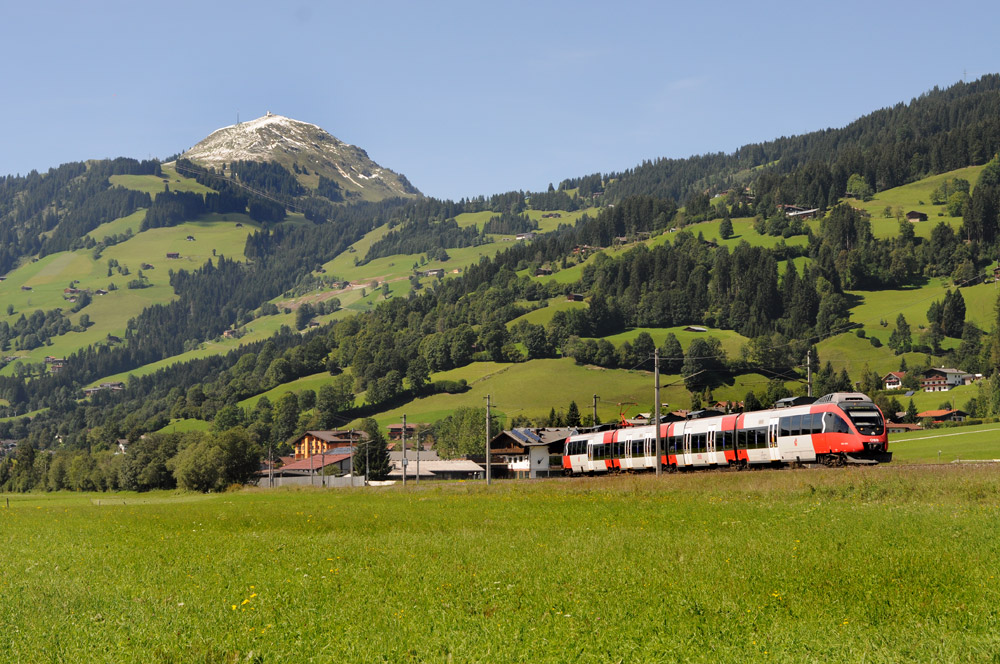
Bombardier Talent railcar near Brixen im Thale

Up to today, the Salzburg-Tyrol Railway is the only east–west railway link to Tyrol that runs entirely on Austrian territory. The fact that there is no parallel motorway link on national territory gave the line great importance, especially before Austria's accession to the EU in 1995. However, its significance is increasingly on the wane, partly because it has the characteristics of an Alpine railway with steep hills and tight curves, hence high-speed rail transport is not possible. Austrian east-west trains therefore usually use the route from Salzburg via Rosenheim station in Germany to Innsbruck, transiting the Deutsches Eck link.

The line is important, though, especially for regional services, as part of the connection from Innsbruck to the state capitals Klagenfurt and Graz as well as part of the line from Salzburg to Graz (via the Enns Valley Railway). In addition, the only Austrian coach transport service from North Tyrol to Lienz in East Tyrol leaves from Kitzbühel station on the Salzburg-Tyrol Railway. The line is also fairly important as an alternative route for international rail traffic on the east–west axis, but it is more significant as a feeder for the Tauern Railway crossing the Hohe Tauern range of the Central Eastern Alps from north to south. The Salzburg-Tyrol Railway is also used by sleeping car trains. The night train from Bregenz to Vienna used to run on this line until December 2008, in order to achieve journey times that enabled passengers to spend enough time in the sleepers and to save the rail tolls charged by German Deutsche Bahn railway company for using the Deutsches Eck transport link.

The railway is also important for local services in the central region of Salzburg and in North Tyrol. Between Salzburg Hauptbahnhof and Golling-Abtenau the line is served every half-an-hour and from Golling to Schwarzach every hour by the S3 line of the Salzburg S-Bahn network. The section from Wörgl to Saalfelden is served by the S6 line of Tyrol S-Bahn system.

== See also ==
- Rail transport in Austria

== Literature ==
- Alfred Horn: Die Eisenbahnen in Austria: Offizielles Jubiläumsbuch zum 150jährigen Bestehen, Bohmann Verlag 1986, ISBN 3-700206-43-7
- Eisenbahnatlas Austria, Verlag Schweers + Wall, S. 63, ISBN 978-3894941284
- Alfred Horn: ÖBB Handbuch 1993, Bohmann Verlag, Vienna 1993, ISBN 3-7002-0824-3
