= Carina Reiter =

Austrian politician (born 1988)

Member of the National Council
- Incumbent
- Assumed office 23 October 2019
- Constituency: Lungau-Pinzgau-Pongau

Personal details
- Born: 22 November 1988 (age 37)
- Party: Austrian People's Party

Carina Reiter (born 22 November 1988) is an Austrian politician of the Austrian People's Party. In the 2019 legislative election, she was elected member of the National Council. Since 2014, she has been a municipal councillor of Pfarrwerfen.
