= Hüttschlag =

- Municipality
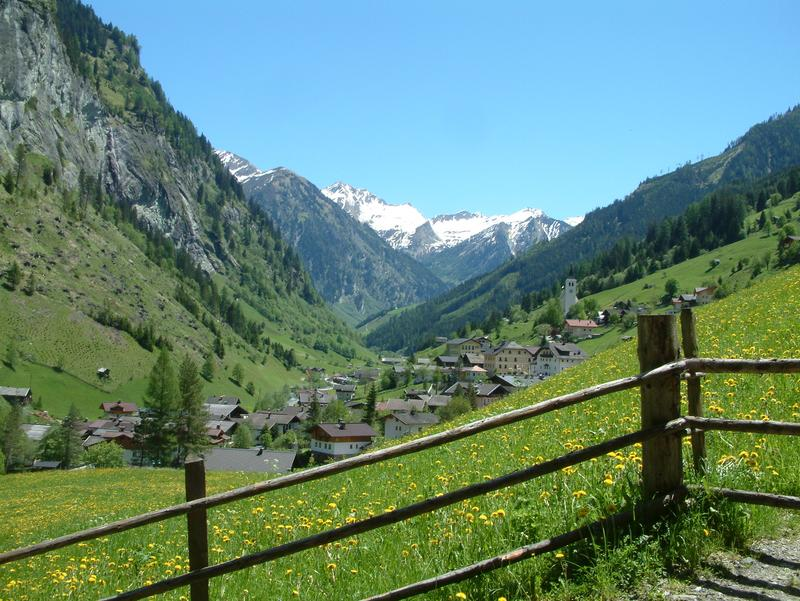
- View towards the High Tauern range

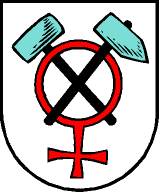
- Coat of arms

- Location within Austria
- Coordinates: 47°11′0″N 13°14′0″E
- Country: Austria
- State: Salzburg
- District: St. Johann im Pongau

Government
  - Mayor: Hans Toferer (ÖVP)

Area
  - Total: 97.18 km^{2} (37.52 sq mi)
- Elevation: 1,030 m (3,380 ft)

Population (2025-01-01)
  - Total: 885
  - Density: 9.11/km^{2} (23.6/sq mi)
- Time zone: UTC+1 (CET)
  - Summer (DST): UTC+2 (CEST)
- Postal code: 5612
- Area code: 06417
- Vehicle registration: JO
- Website: www.huettschlag.cc/

Hüttschlag is a municipality in the district of St. Johann im Pongau in the Austrian state of Salzburg.

== Geography ==
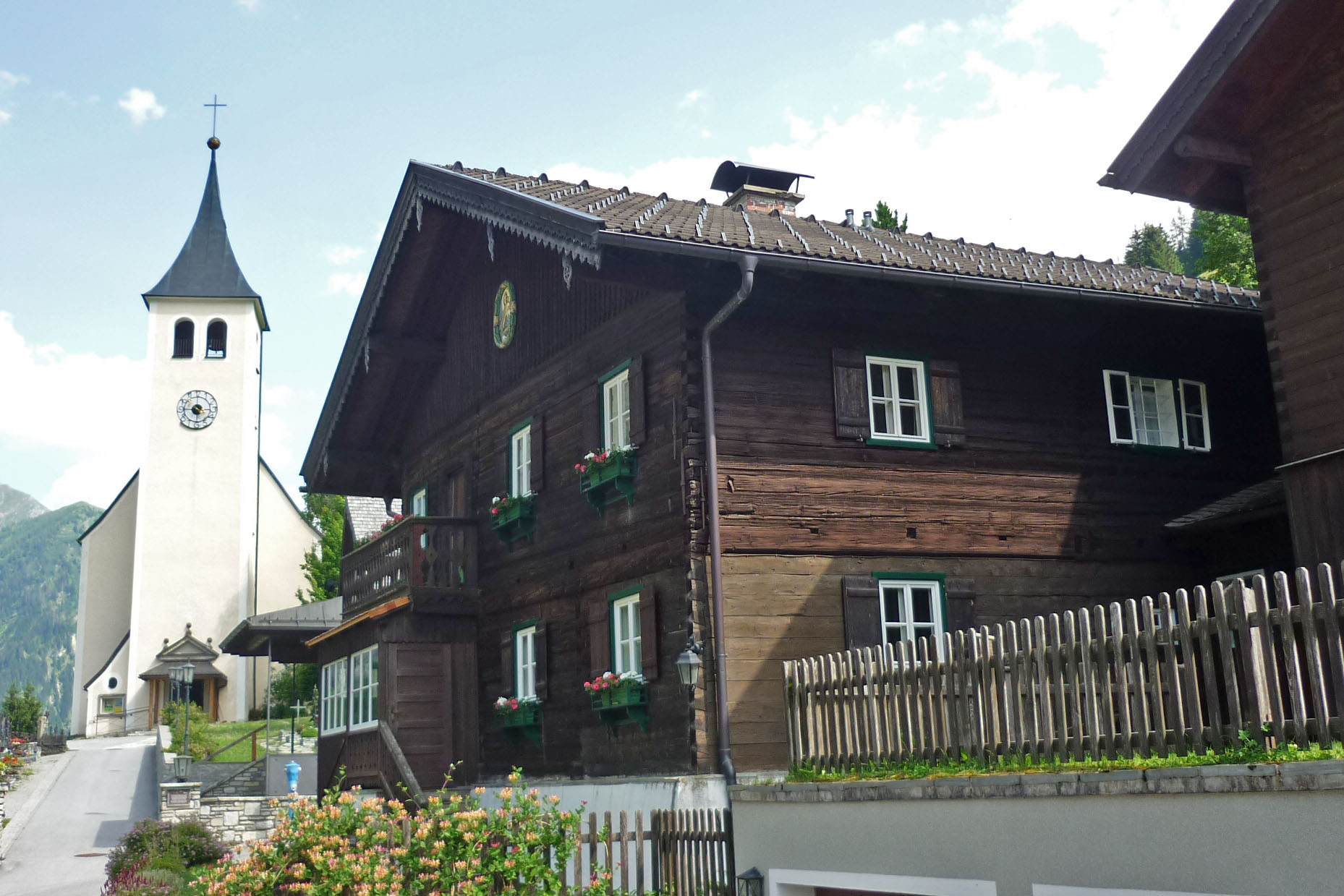
Parish church and parsonage

Hüttschlag lies in the Grossarl valley, south of the Grossarl municipality, in the Salzburg Pongau region. The settlement is situated in the upper valley immediately north of the Alpine crest, formed by the Ankogel and Hafner mountains of the High Tauern range. From Hüttschlag only a bridle pass leads up to Arlscharte Pass and the Malta valley in Carinthia.

The municipal area comprises the cadastral communities of Hüttschlag proper, Karteis, and See. Originally an agricultural area, Hüttschlag today mainly depends on tourism. Together with neighbouring Dorfgastein, the Grossarl valley forms a ski resort within the large Ski Amadé region.

== History ==
The Arla valley was first mentioned about 930 AD, when Bavarian settlers had already superseded the former Slavic population. The area up to the High Tauern crest was further developed by the Archbishops of Salzburg; from the early 15th century onwards, it became an important mining area, mainly for copper and sulphur. Extended smelting works (Hütten) arose around 1520; as a result of miners moving in, Hüttschlag became a centre of Protestantism in the Salzburg lands —many of these Salzburg Protestants were expelled under the rule of Prince-Archbishop Leopold Anton von Firmian in 1731.

== Politics ==
Seats in the municipal council (Gemeinderat):

- Austrian People's Party (ÖVP): 8
- Social Democratic Party of Austria (SPÖ): 5

=== Twin towns — sister cities ===
Hüttschlag is twinned with:

- Borken, Germany, since 1989
