= Hüttau =

Hüttau Hittau
- Municipality
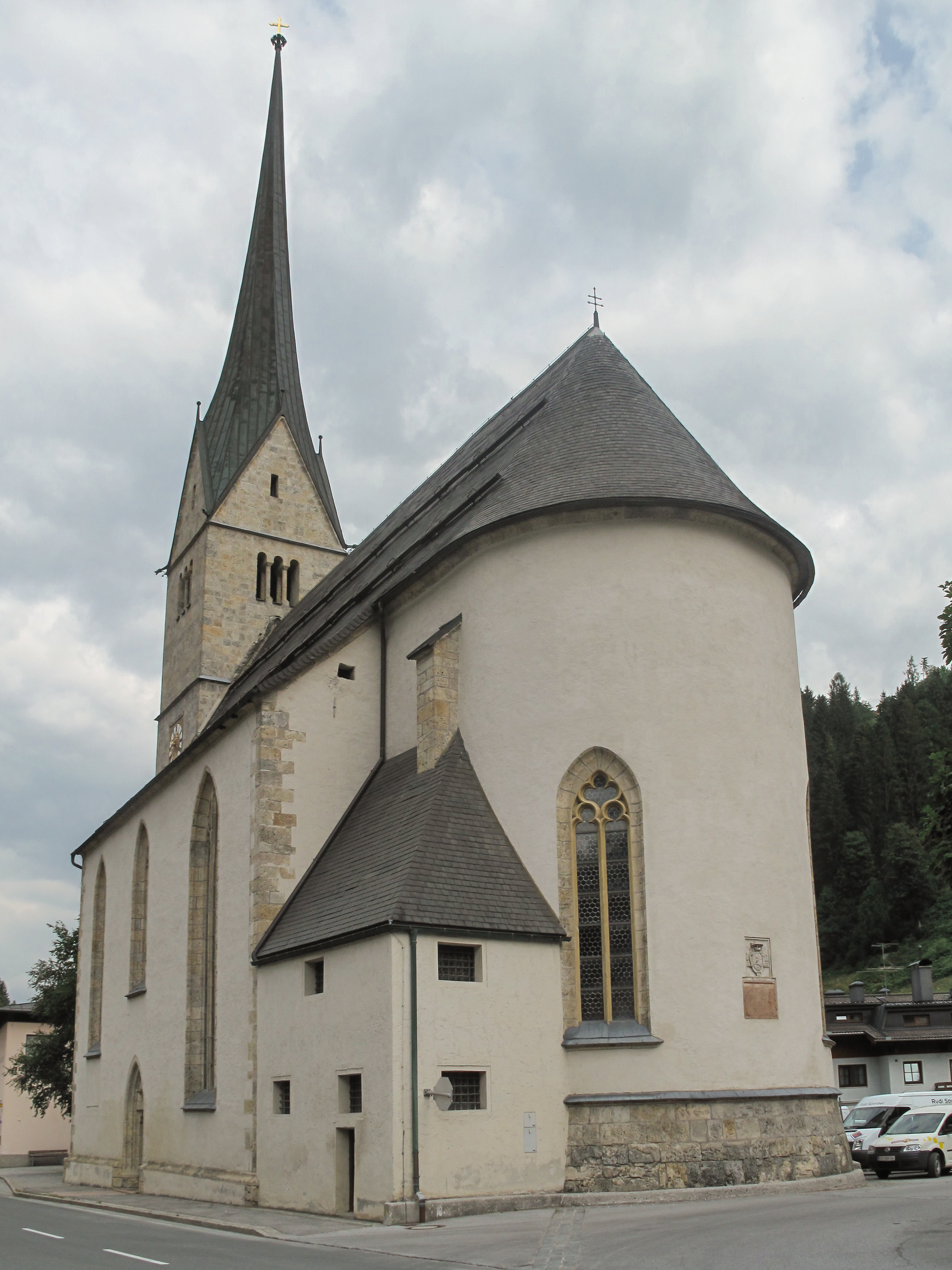

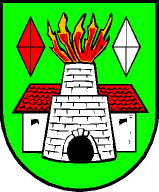
- Coat of arms

- Location within Austria
- Coordinates: 47°25′0″N 13°18′30″E
- Country: Austria
- State: Salzburg
- District: St. Johann im Pongau

Government
  - Mayor: Rupert Bergmüller (ÖVP)

Area
  - Total: 53.58 km^{2} (20.69 sq mi)
- Elevation: 697 m (2,287 ft)

Population (2018-01-01)
  - Total: 1,492
  - Density: 27.85/km^{2} (72.12/sq mi)
- Time zone: UTC+1 (CET)
  - Summer (DST): UTC+2 (CEST)
- Postal code: 5511
- Area code: 06458
- Vehicle registration: JO

Hüttau (Bavarian: Hittau) is a municipality in the St. Johann im Pongau district in the Austrian state of Salzburg.

== Geography ==
Hüttau lies in the Fritz valley in the Pongau.

== Gallery ==
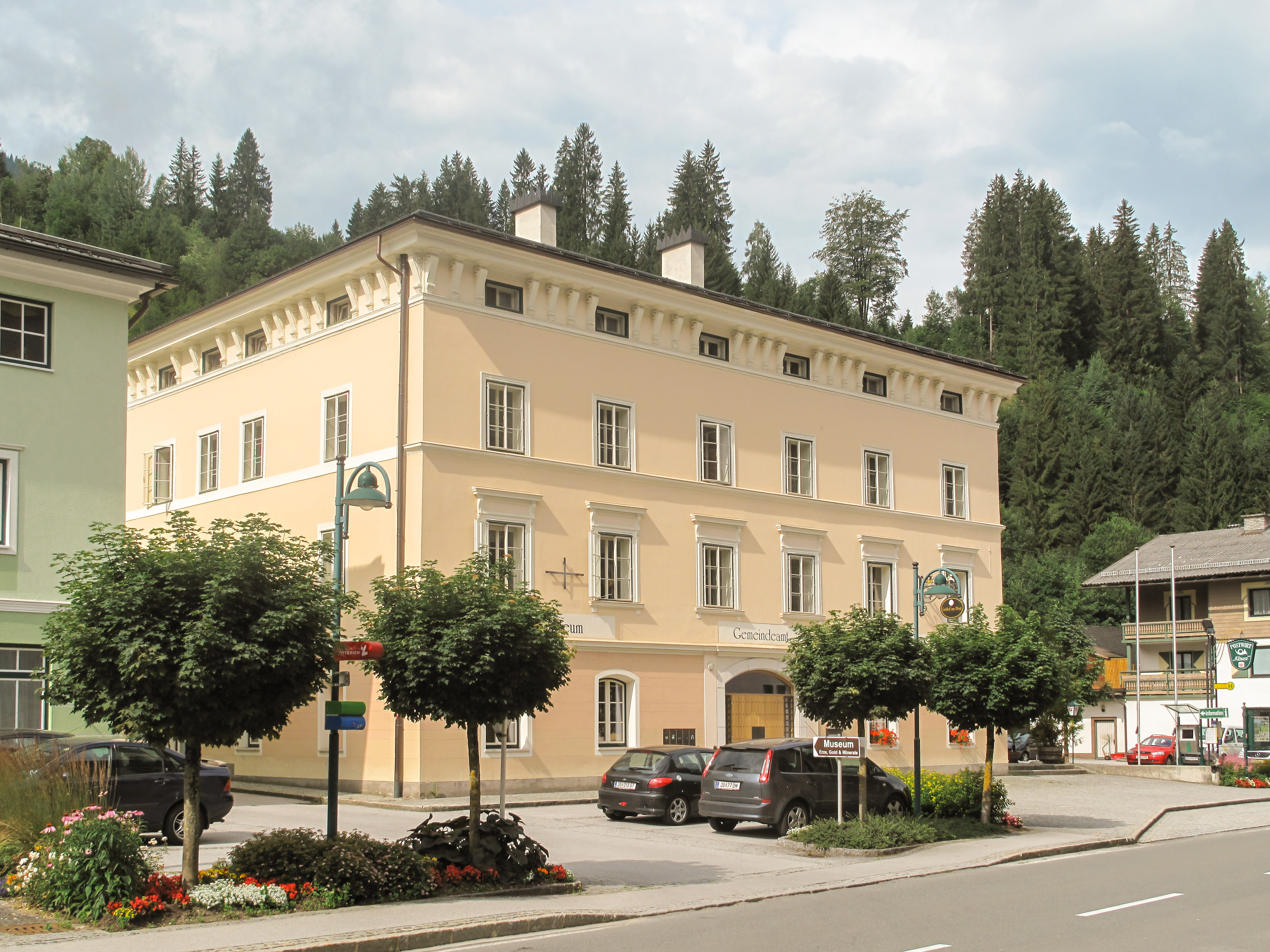
Hüttau, townhall

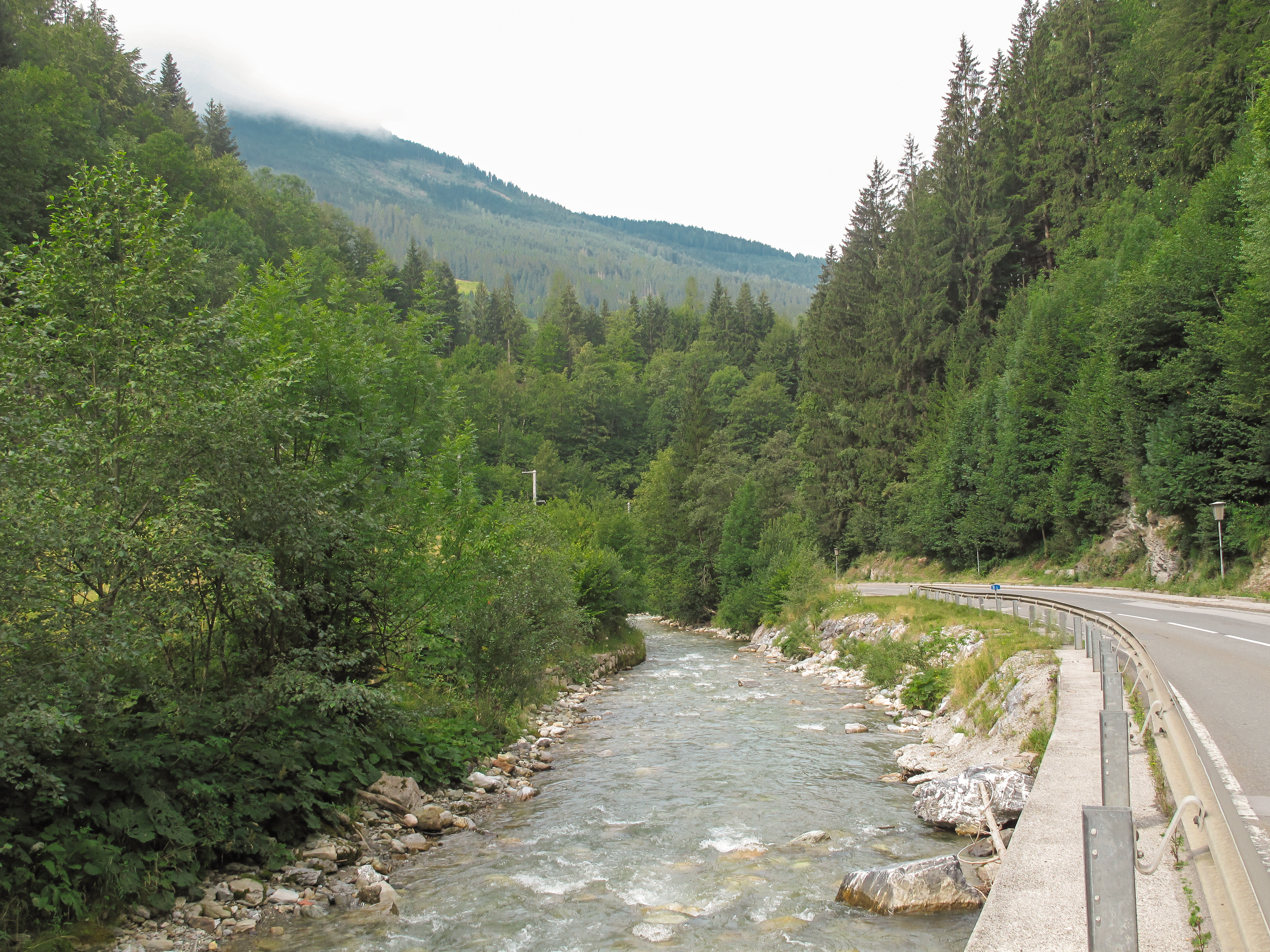
between Hüttau und Niedernfritz, river:der Fritzbach

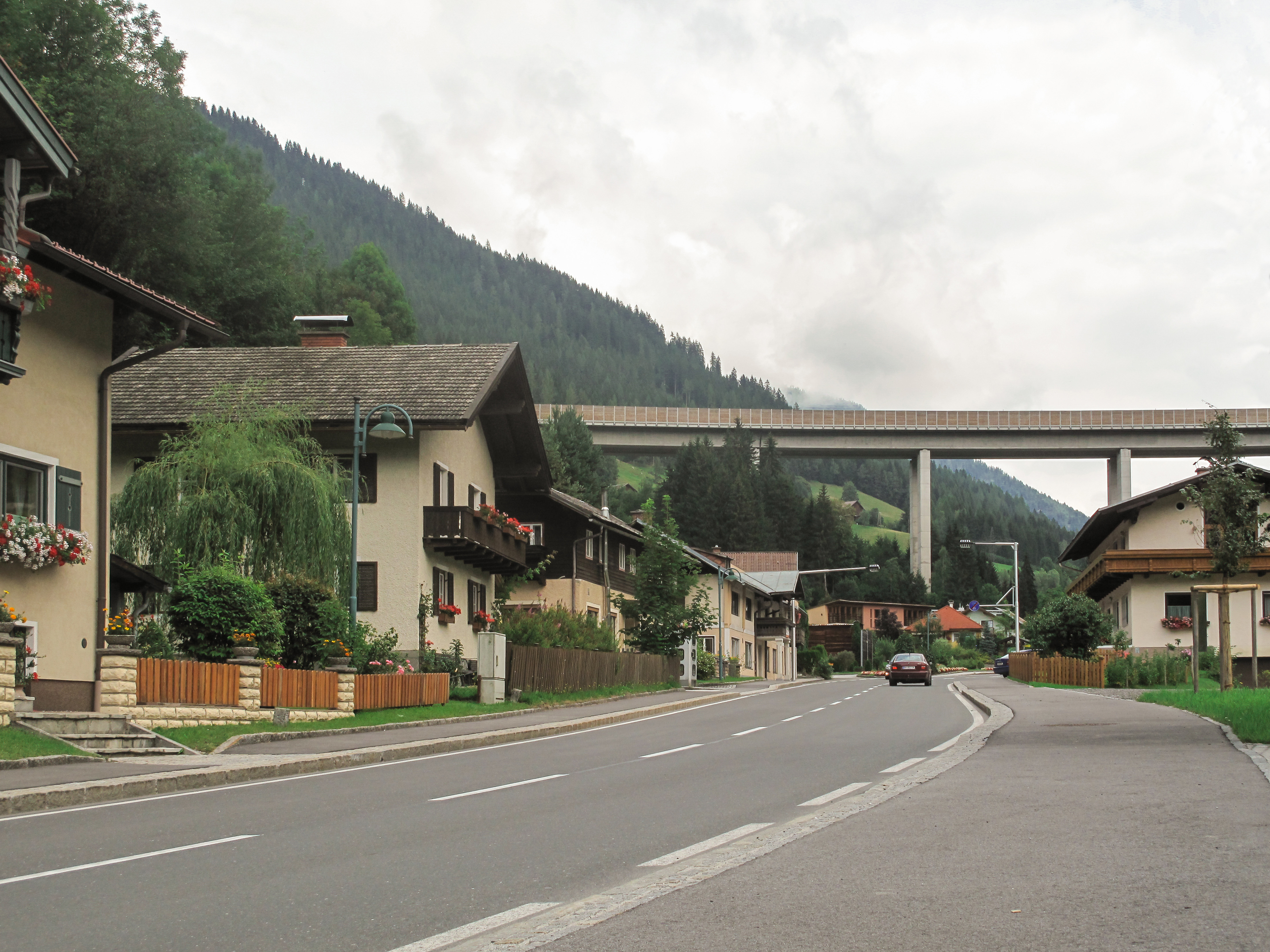
Niedernfritz, overpass
