= Forstau =

- Municipality
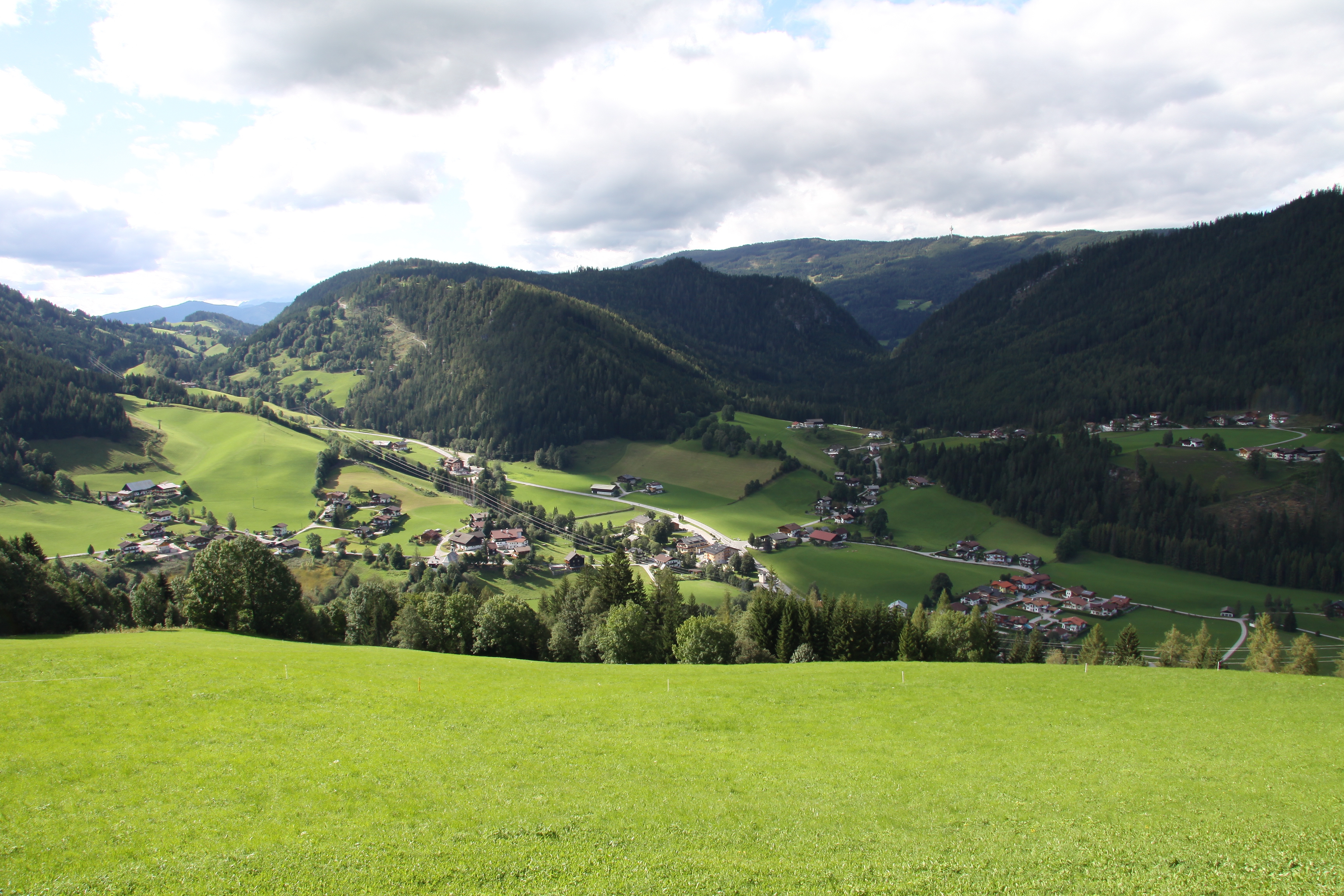
- Forstau

- Coat of arms

- Location within Austria
- Coordinates: 47°22′0″N 13°31′0″E
- Country: Austria
- State: Salzburg
- District: St. Johann im Pongau

Government
  - Mayor: Josef Buchsteiner (ÖVP)

Area
  - Total: 59.47 km^{2} (22.96 sq mi)
- Elevation: 923 m (3,028 ft)

Population (2018-01-01)
  - Total: 540
  - Density: 9.1/km^{2} (24/sq mi)
- Time zone: UTC+1 (CET)
  - Summer (DST): UTC+2 (CEST)
- Postal code: 5550
- Area code: 06454
- Vehicle registration: JO
- Website: www.forstau.at

Forstau is a municipality in the St. Johann im Pongau district in the Austria state of Salzburg.

== Geography ==
Forstau lies in the high valley between Radstadt and Schladming.
