= Grossarl =

- Municipality
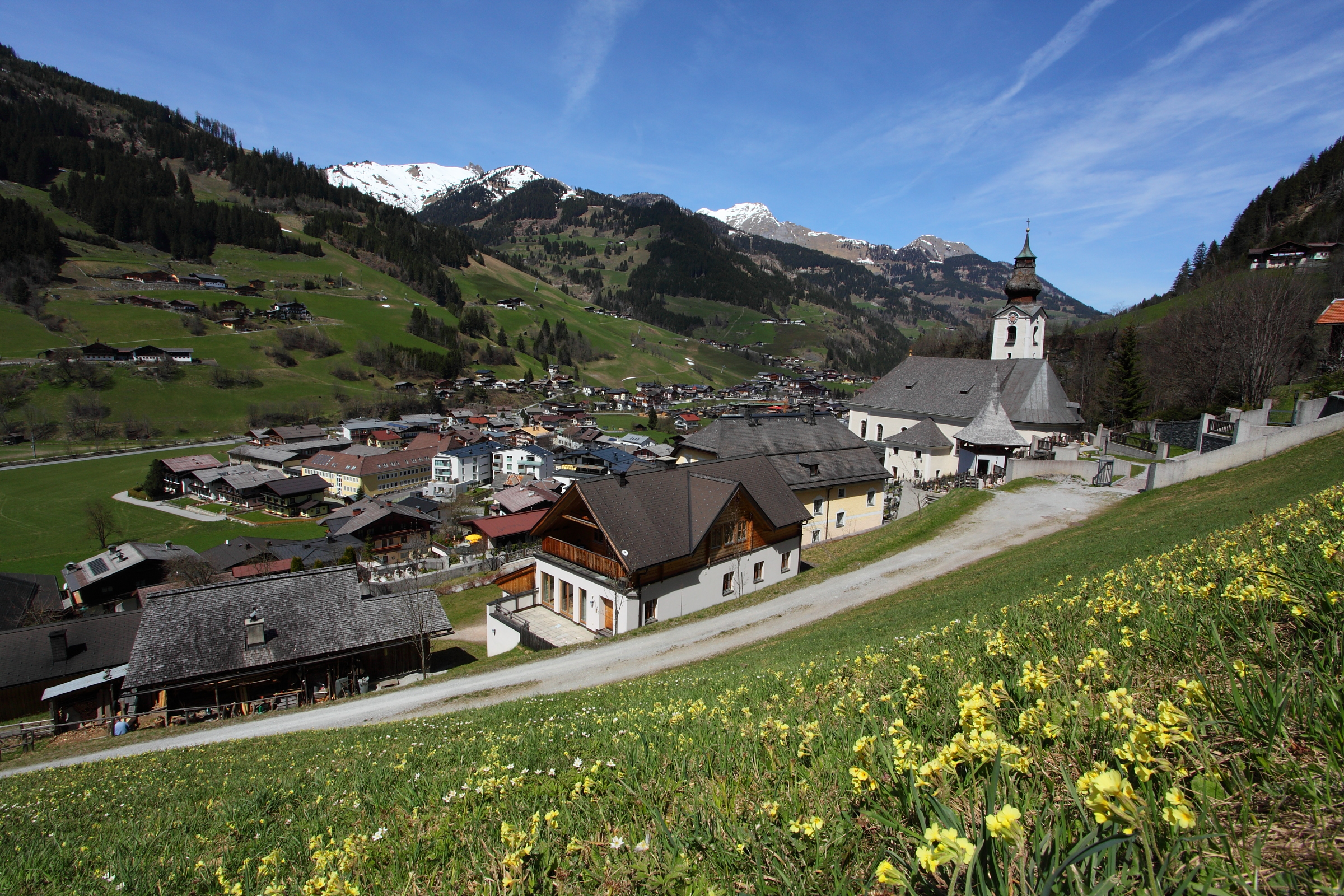

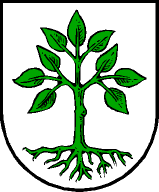
- Coat of arms

- Location within Austria
- Coordinates: 47°13′0″N 13°11′0″E
- Country: Austria
- State: Salzburg
- District: St. Johann im Pongau

Government
  - Mayor: Johann Rohrmoser (ÖVP)

Area
  - Total: 129.23 km^{2} (49.90 sq mi)
- Elevation: 924 m (3,031 ft)

Population (2025-01-01)
  - Total: 3,843
  - Density: 29.74/km^{2} (77.02/sq mi)
- Time zone: UTC+1 (CET)
  - Summer (DST): UTC+2 (CEST)
- Postal code: 5611
- Area code: 06414
- Vehicle registration: JO
- Website: www.gemeindegrossarl.at

Grossarl (Großarl) is a market town in the St. Johann im Pongau district in the state of Salzburg in western central Austria. The valley Grossarltal got its name from Grossarl.

== Geography ==
=== Location ===
The market town is located in the Grossarl Valley in Pongau, 70 kilometres (43 mi) south of the city of Salzburg. It is divided in the districts (north to south) Au (850 metres or 2,789 feet AMSL), Schied (860 m), Unterberg (900 metres or 2,953 feet), Großarl (895 m) as well as Eben and Bach (900 m).

== Politics ==
=== Local politics ===
Mayor is Johann Rohrmoser (ÖVP), Vice Mayor is Johann Ganitzer (SPÖ).

=== Coat of arms ===
Grossarl got its coat of arms in 1965. It is a green uprooted alder on white ground. The illustration of the alder accords to the old German name of the market town "Arla". In 1339, Grossarl was mentioned as the valley with "merern Arel", what means "many alders". The sign of the alder shows the big tree clearings in the valley from the 11th to the 13th century. It also shows the big meaning of the wood industry in the valley. Some people say that it is also a symbol for the attachment of the inhabitants to the valley and its leaves show many children which were born in Grossarl.

== Economy and infrastructure ==
Grossarl is a tourist-heavy market town. Because of the 40 alpine cottages, Grossarl is also called "the valley of alpine cottages", in German "Das Tal der Almen".

Over the years, many small and medium enterprises settled down in the valley and became important employers for citizens of Grossarl (carpenter, bricklayer and earth-moving companies, etc.)

== Prominent people ==
=== Notable citizens ===
- Sebastian Gruber (*05. July 1995 in Schwarzach) paraglider
- Edmund Entacher (* 30. September 1949 in Grossarl) General of the Austrian Armed Forces
- Anton Sauter (1800–1881), Botanist and Doctor, brother of Ferdinand Sauter, founder of the corporation of Salzburgs regional and cultural studies
- Ignatius Rieder (1858 Grossarl-1934 Salzburg), 1918-1934 archbishop of Salzburg
- Alois Rohrmoser (1932 Grossarl-2005 Wagrain), founder of the factory Atomic Skis
- Wolfram Paulus (*1957), film director and scriptwriter

=== Personalities with connections to the village ===
- Sepp Forcher (*17. December 1930 Rome), Austrian TV presenter, 1955-1959 host on the Berglandhaus in Grossarl
