= St. Martin am Tennengebirge =

- Municipality
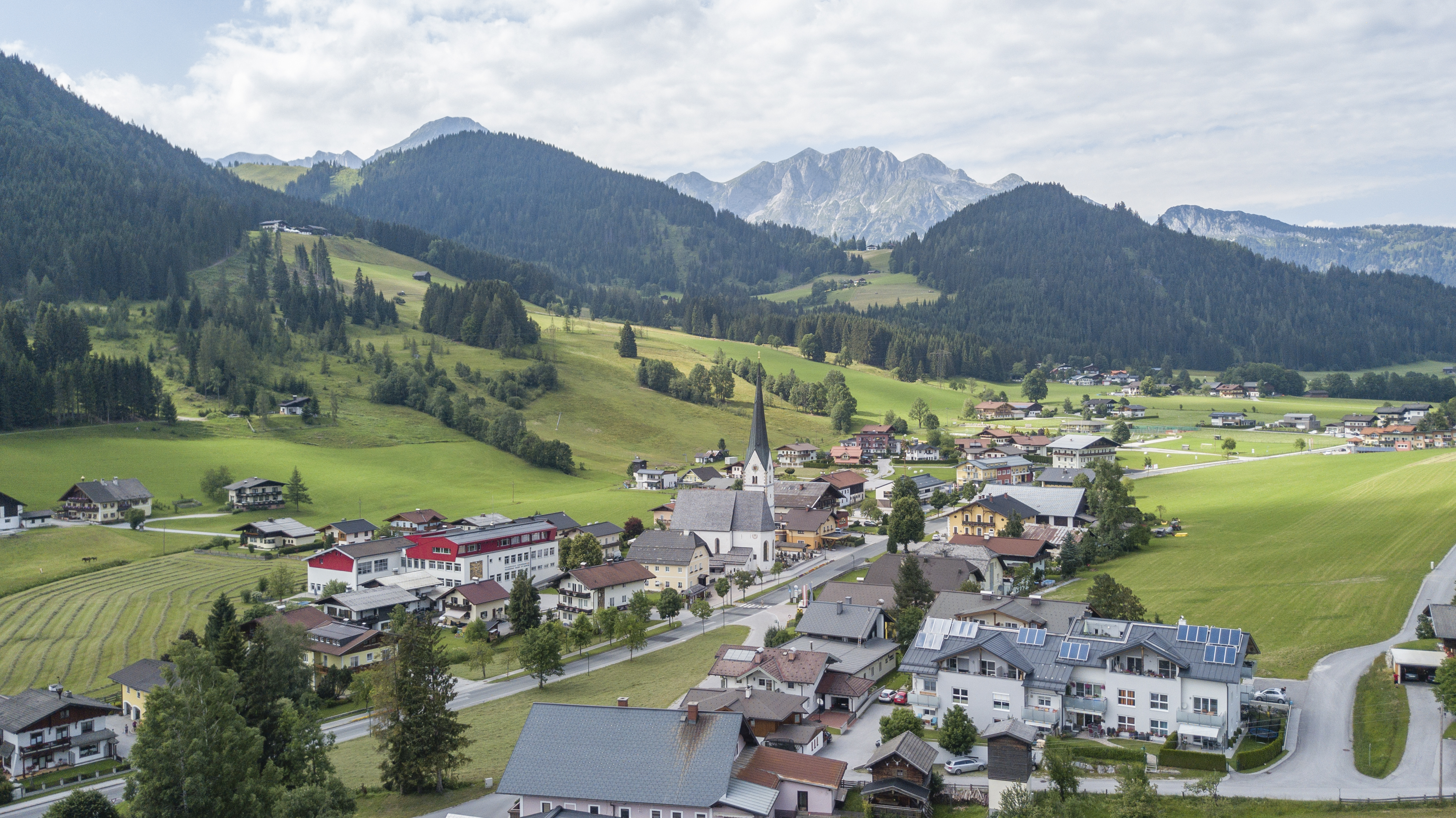

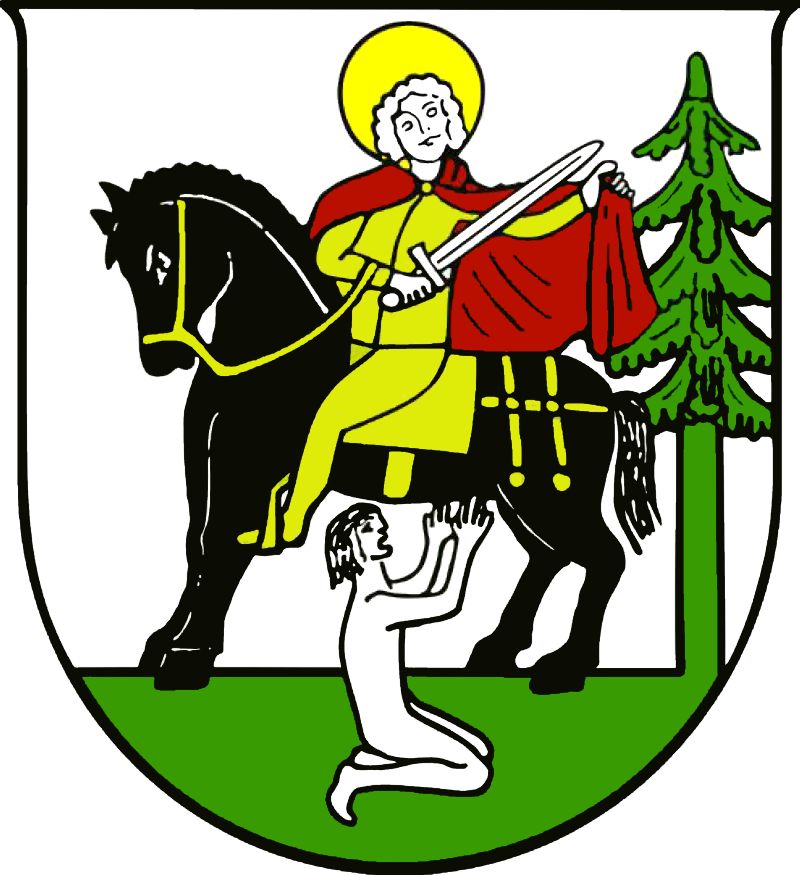
- Coat of arms

- Location within Austria
- Coordinates: 47°27′53″N 13°22′50″E
- Country: Austria
- State: Salzburg
- District: St. Johann im Pongau

Government
  - Mayor: Johannes Schlager (ÖVP)

Area
  - Total: 46.8 km^{2} (18.1 sq mi)
- Elevation: 949 m (3,114 ft)

Population (2025-01-01)
  - Total: 1,777
  - Density: 38.0/km^{2} (98.3/sq mi)
- Time zone: UTC+1 (CET)
  - Summer (DST): UTC+2 (CEST)
- Postal code: 5522
- Area code: 06463
- Vehicle registration: JO
- Website: www.sanktmartin.at

St. Martin am Tennengebirge is a municipality in the St. Johann im Pongau district in the Austrian state of Salzburg.

== Geography ==
The village is located in the Ennspongau of the Salzburger Land, in a side valley of the Fritztal, between the southern foot of the Tennen Mountains and the Gerzkopf, a foothill of the Dachstein massif. It also belongs to the Lammertal region, in which it has shares, and to which it represents the valley pass.

== Culture and places of interest ==
- Parish church of St. Martin am Tennengebirge, Gothic hall church of the 1430s with Baroque interior.

== Gallery ==
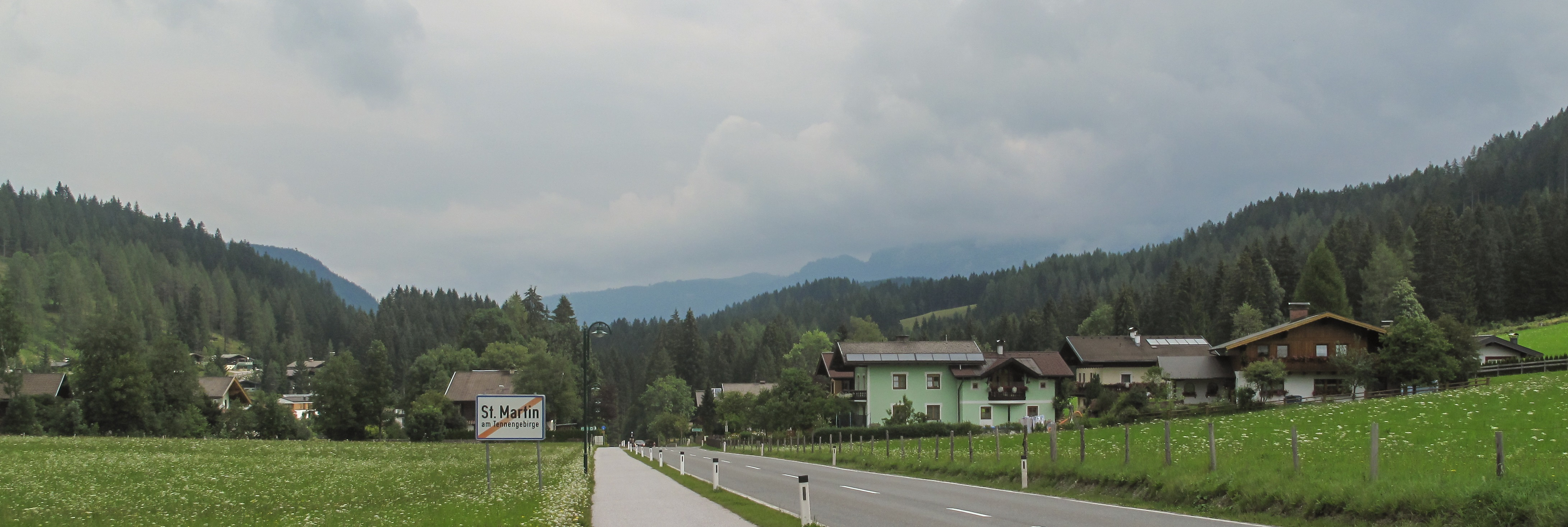
Sankt Martin am Tennengebirge, view to the village
