= Anton Eleutherius Sauter =

Austrian botanist and physician

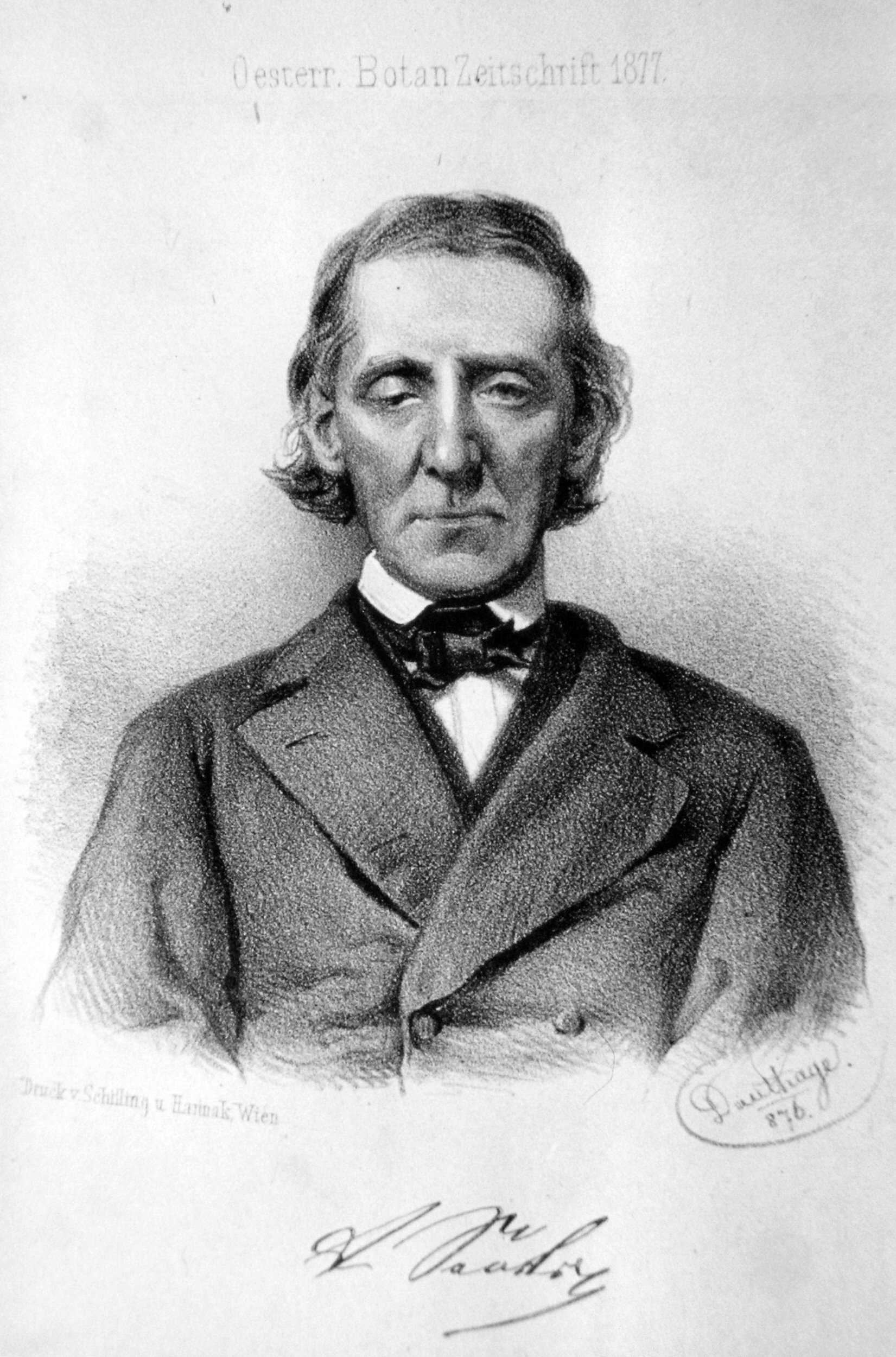
Anton Eleutherius Sauter

Anton Eleutherius Sauter (18 April 1800 in Grossarl – 1881 in Salzburg) was an Austrian medical doctor and botanist.

From 1820 to 1826 he studied medicine at the University of Vienna, where one of his instructors was Joseph Franz von Jacquin. After graduation, he worked as a physician at several locations in Austria. In 1840 he settled as a physician in Steyr, then from 1848 to 1871, served as a regional and district doctor in Salzburg.

He is largely known for his investigations of flora native to Land Salzburg. From 1866 to 1879 he published in seven volumes, "Flora des Herzogthums Salzburg" (Flora of the Duchy of Salzburg}. In 1860 he was co-founder of the Gesellschaft für Salzburger Landeskunde (board member, 1864–74). Numerous taxa with the specific epithet of sauteri are named after him, an example being Draba sauteri. Sauter edited two exsiccata-like series, namely Flora Tirolensis exsiccata alpina atque subalpina and Decaden getrockneter Alpenpflanzen.

== Works ==
- Versuch einer Geographisch-Botanischen Schilderung der Umgebung Wiens (1826), gedruckt bei Anton v. Haykul.
- Flora des Herzogthums Salzburg (1866–1879) Mitteilungen der Gesellschaft für Salzburger Landeskunde, Nr. 6 und folgende, veröffentlicht in 7 Teilen.
- Die Kryptogramische Flora der Nordseite unserer Alpen - verfasst in drei Teilen (Laubmoose, Lebermoose, Flechten) veröffentlicht im Botanischen Zentralblatt (1846).
