= Alois Rohrmoser =

Austrian entrepreneur

Alois Rohrmoser (July 11, 1932 in Grossarl, Austria, - April 2005 in Wagrain, Austria) is an Austrian entrepreneur, and founder of Atomic Skis, in Altenmarkt im Pongau.

== Career ==
At age 23 he bought a small business and began production of wooden skis with four employees. He gradually expanded in Wagrain to industrial ski production. He was the bearer of the golden honorary mark of the province of Salzburg, bearer of the Golden Ehrenring and vice-mayor of Wagrain. In 1982, he was appointed a commercial councilor. He died of a heart attack in Wagrain.
