= St. Johann im Pongau District =

Coordinates: 47.350°N 13.233°E

St. Johann im Pongau District Bezirk St. Johann im Pongau
- District
- Country: Austria
- State: Salzburg
- Number of municipalities: 25
- Administrative seat: St. Johann im Pongau

Government
  - District Governor: Harald Wimmer

Area
  - Total: 1,755.37 km^{2} (677.75 sq mi)

Population (2001)
  - Total: 77,872
  - Density: 44.362/km^{2} (114.90/sq mi)
- Time zone: UTC+01:00 (CET)
  - Summer (DST): UTC+02:00 (CEST)
- Vehicle registration: JO

Historical population
Year	Pop.	±%
1869	27,105	—
1880	28,678	+5.8%
1890	30,118	+5.0%
1900	31,499	+4.6%
1910	36,516	+15.9%
1923	38,317	+4.9%
1934	41,996	+9.6%
1939	43,115	+2.7%
1951	53,072	+23.1%
1961	57,100	+7.6%
1971	63,479	+11.2%
1981	67,410	+6.2%
1991	71,955	+6.7%
2001	77,872	+8.2%
Source: Statistik Austria

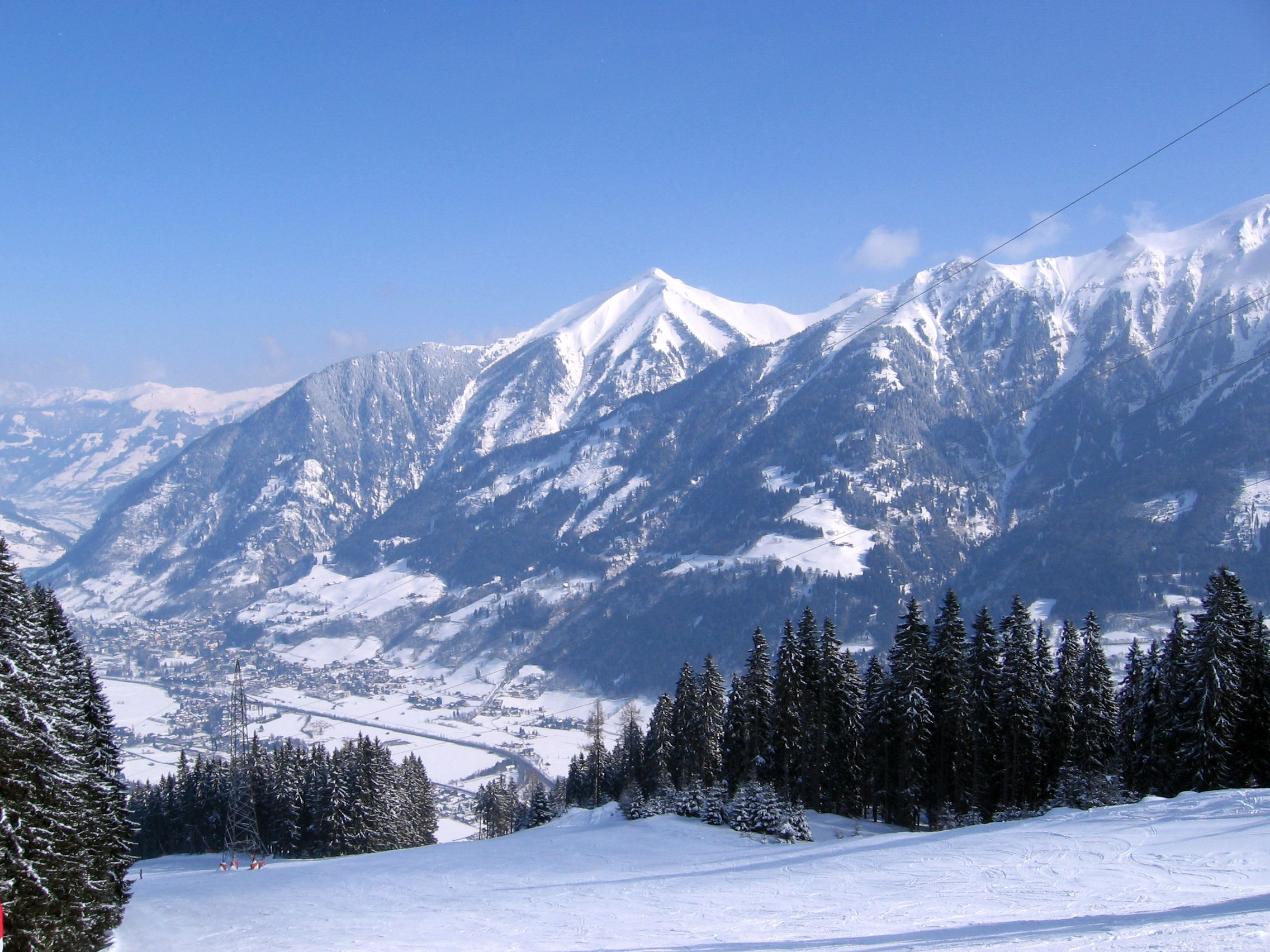
Bad Hofgastein from above, in winter

The Bezirk St. Johann im Pongau is an administrative district (Bezirk) in the federal state of Salzburg, Austria, and congruent with the Pongau region.

Area of the district is 1,755.37 km^{2}, with a population of 77,872 (May 15, 2001), and population density 44 people per km^{2}. Administrative center of the district is St. Johann im Pongau.

== Administrative divisions ==
The district is divided into 25 municipalities, three of them are towns, and seven of them are market towns.

=== Towns ===
1. Bischofshofen (10,087)
2. Radstadt (4,710)
3. St. Johann im Pongau (10,260)

=== Market towns ===
1. Altenmarkt im Pongau (3,486)
2. Bad Hofgastein (6,727)
3. Großarl (3,634)
4. St. Veit im Pongau (3,330)
5. Schwarzach im Pongau (3,526)
6. Wagrain (3,127)
7. Werfen (3,085)

=== Municipalities ===
1. Bad Gastein (5,838)
2. Dorfgastein (1,649)
3. Eben im Pongau (2,005)
4. Filzmoos (1,352)
5. Flachau (2,625)
6. Forstau (515)
7. Goldegg (2,216)
8. Hüttau (1,555)
9. Hüttschlag (974)
10. Kleinarl (743)
11. Mühlbach am Hochkönig (1,629)
12. Pfarrwerfen (2,174)
13. St. Martin am Tennengebirge (1,406)
14. Untertauern (453)
15. Werfenweng (766)

(population numbers May 15, 2001)

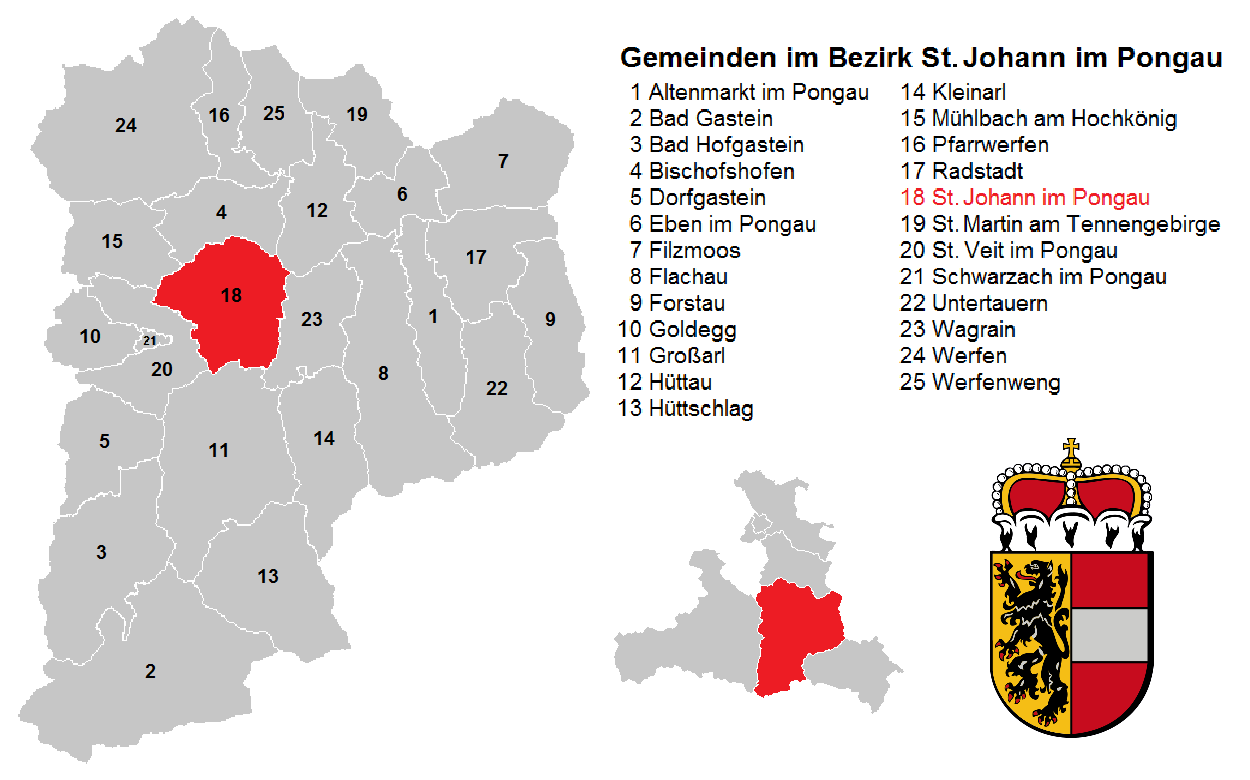

== Tourist attractions ==
- Liechtensteinklamm

== See also ==
- Salzburg
- Salzburgerland
