= Goldegg =

- Municipality
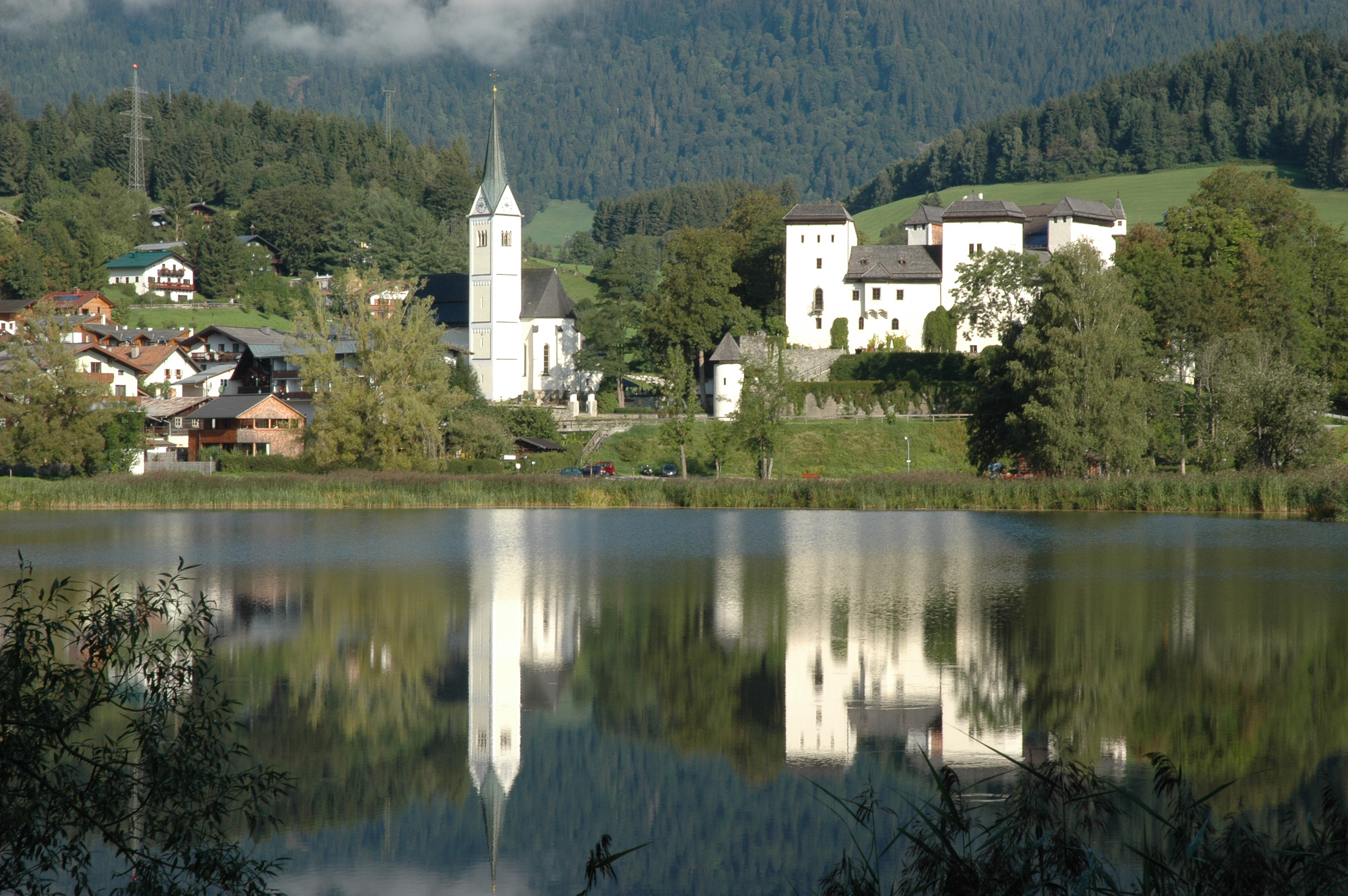
- Lakeside with parish church and castle

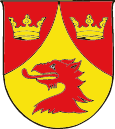
- Coat of arms

- Location within Austria
- Coordinates: 47°19′0″N 13°5′0″E
- Country: Austria
- State: Salzburg
- District: St. Johann im Pongau

Government
  - Mayor: Johann Fleißner (ÖVP)

Area
  - Total: 33.06 km^{2} (12.76 sq mi)
- Elevation: 822 m (2,697 ft)

Population (2018-01-01)
  - Total: 2,533
  - Density: 76.62/km^{2} (198.4/sq mi)
- Time zone: UTC+1 (CET)
  - Summer (DST): UTC+2 (CEST)
- Postal code: 5622
- Area code: 06415
- Vehicle registration: JO
- Website: www.goldeggamsee.at

Goldegg, also called Goldegg im Pongau, is a municipality in St. Johann im Pongau District, in the state of Salzburg in Austria.

== Geography ==
It is situated on a sunny plateau north of the Salzach River, the so-called « Sunny Terrace » at a distance of 60 km (37 mi) south of the City of Salzburg. In fact, the village owes its name (“Goldegg at the lake”) to a small lake at which it is located. There are approximately 2200 inhabitants living in the local area, which covers 33,1 square kilometres.

The municipal area includes the cadastral communities of Buchberg, Goldegg, and Weng.

== History ==
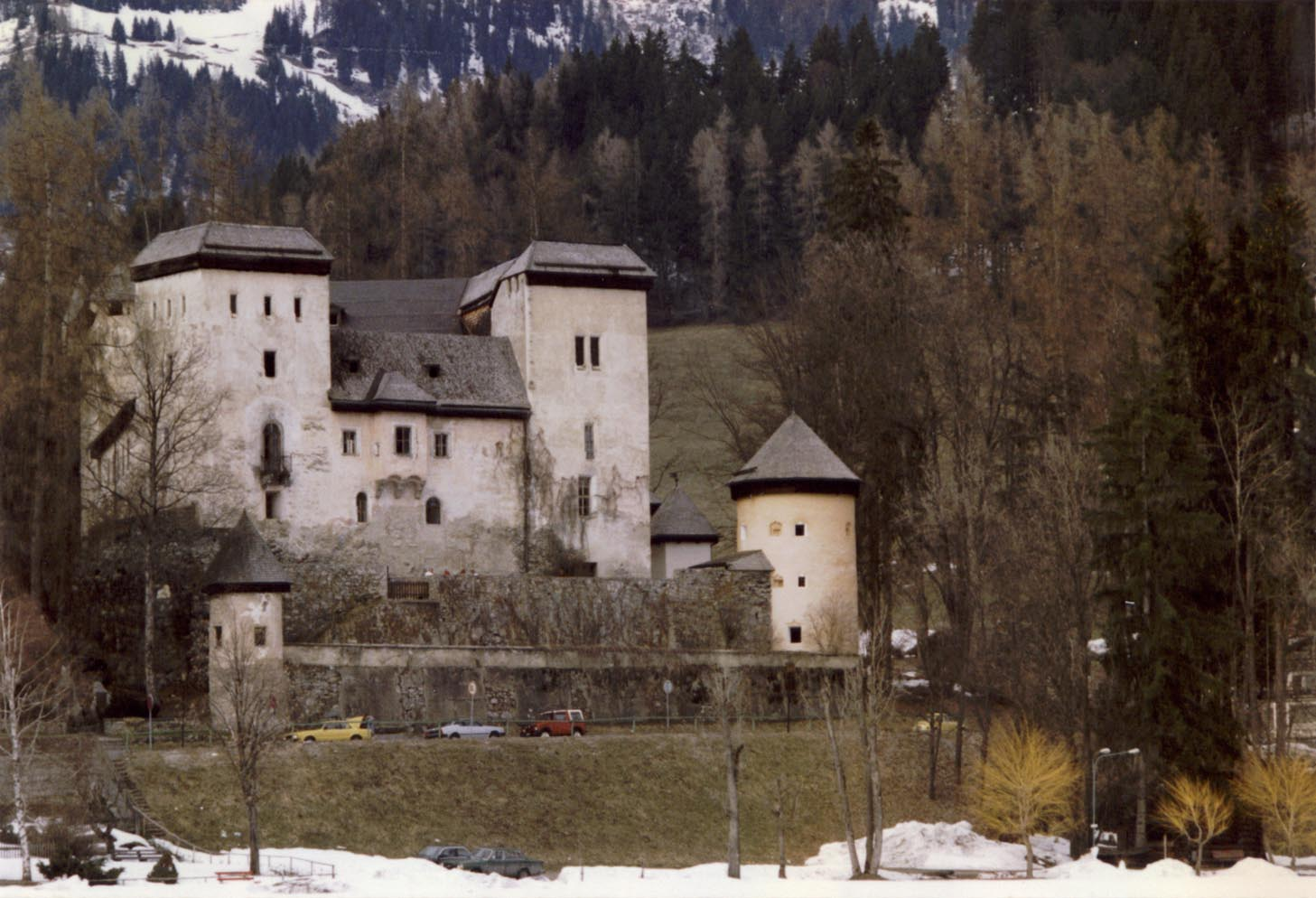
Goldegg Castle

Archaeological findings in the area date back to the Hallstatt era, where a settlement was located on the mountain pass road up the Gastein Valley and across the Hohe Tauern mountain range.

Goldegg Castle was built in the 14th century. The Lords of Goldegg had sided with the Wittelsbach king Louis IV of Germany in the conflict with his Habsburg rival Frederick the Fair, whereafter the Archbishops of Salzburg had their estates devastated. King Louis, having prevailed in the 1322 Battle of Mühldorf, backed the erection of a new castle and a parish church. The building remained a Salzburg fief, given in pawn several time and finally seized by Prince-Archbishop Wolf Dietrich Raitenau in 1612. It is now a modern cultural centre, offering interesting events all the year round, like concerts, exhibitions of regional or international artists, theatrical or comedian performances, seminars or workshops.

The municipality also possesses a museum, exhibiting a great collection of pottery, folkloristic clothes and rustic furniture.

=== Anti-fascist resistance and "Wehrmacht deserters" ===
During World War II, a substantial number of locals centered around the conscientious objector Karl Rupitsch resisted the Nazi hegemony present in the village. After the drawn-out conflict against this local resistance, the resisting forces, hiding in the mountains, were eventually captured one by one, after the local secret police had ordered a battalion of SS men from Hallein to assist in beating the bushes for the "Rupitsch clique". Consequently, a majority of them was deported to concentration camps, although two of them, the Hochleitner brothers, were executed on the spot.

In the past, the locals were divided in their opinions on these "deserters" and to this day remain divided. A large number of locals, primarily in the town centre, were supporters of the Nazis, whereas others, primarily in the neighborhood of Weng, fully supported the anti-fascist resistance. Only very recently, in 2014, the official chronicle of the town removed the references of the resistors as "bandits" and a "scourge". As well in 2014, a memorial to honor the Goldegg resistance was erected. This memorial was desecrated for the first time in 2018.
