= Pfarrwerfen =

- Municipality
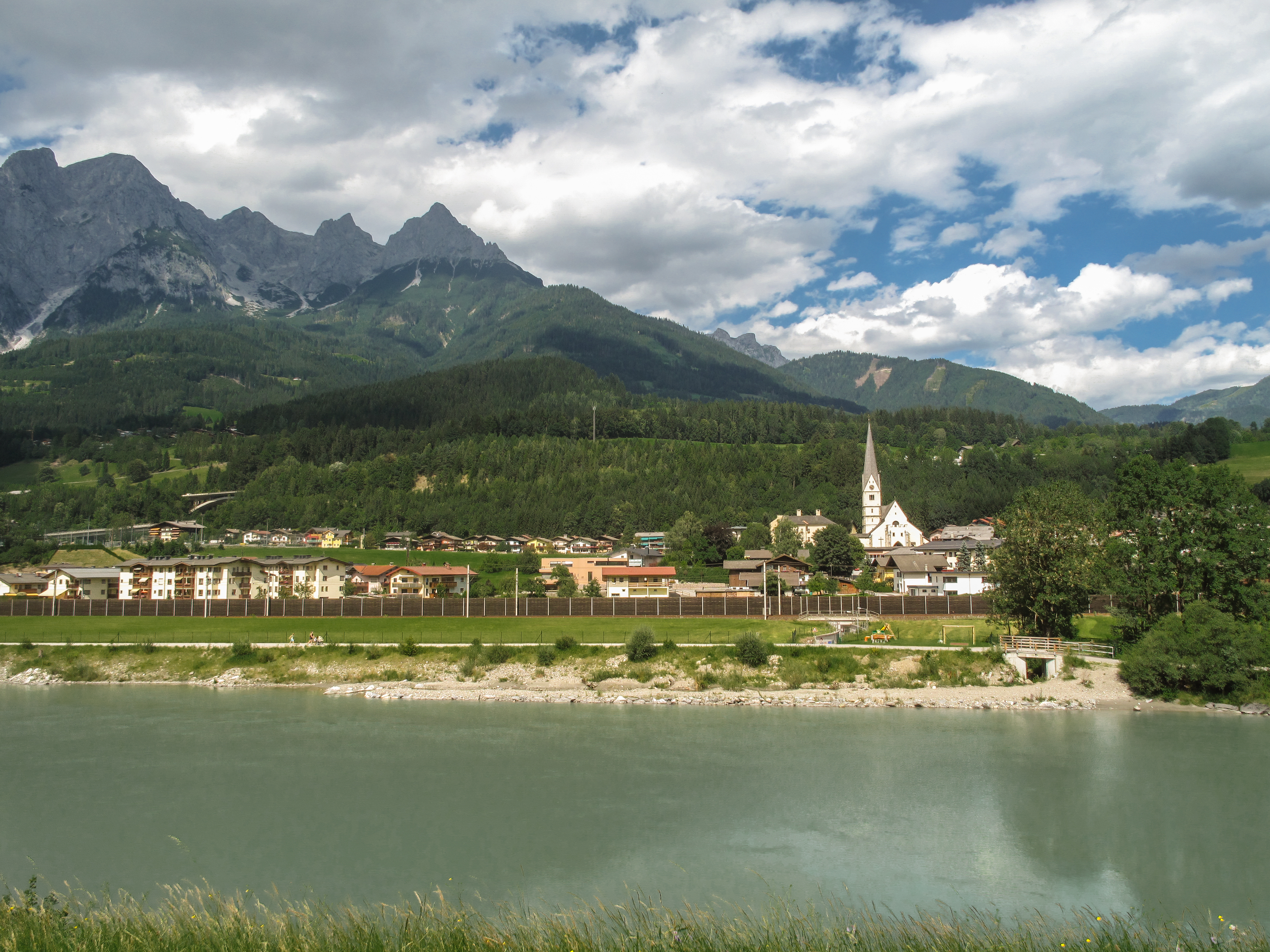

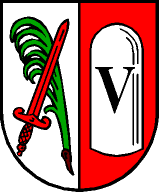
- Coat of arms

- Location within Austria
- Coordinates: 47°27′30″N 13°12′20″E
- Country: Austria
- State: Salzburg
- District: St. Johann im Pongau

Government
  - Mayor: Simon Illmer (ÖVP)

Area
  - Total: 38.18 km^{2} (14.74 sq mi)
- Elevation: 545 m (1,788 ft)

Population (2018-01-01)
  - Total: 2,292
  - Density: 60.03/km^{2} (155.5/sq mi)
- Time zone: UTC+1 (CET)
  - Summer (DST): UTC+2 (CEST)
- Postal code: 5452
- Vehicle registration: JO
- Website: www.pfarrwerfen.salzburg.at

Pfarrwerfen is a municipality in the St. Johann im Pongau district in the Austrian state of Salzburg.

== Geography ==
Pfarrwerfen lies in the Pongau.

== Gallery ==
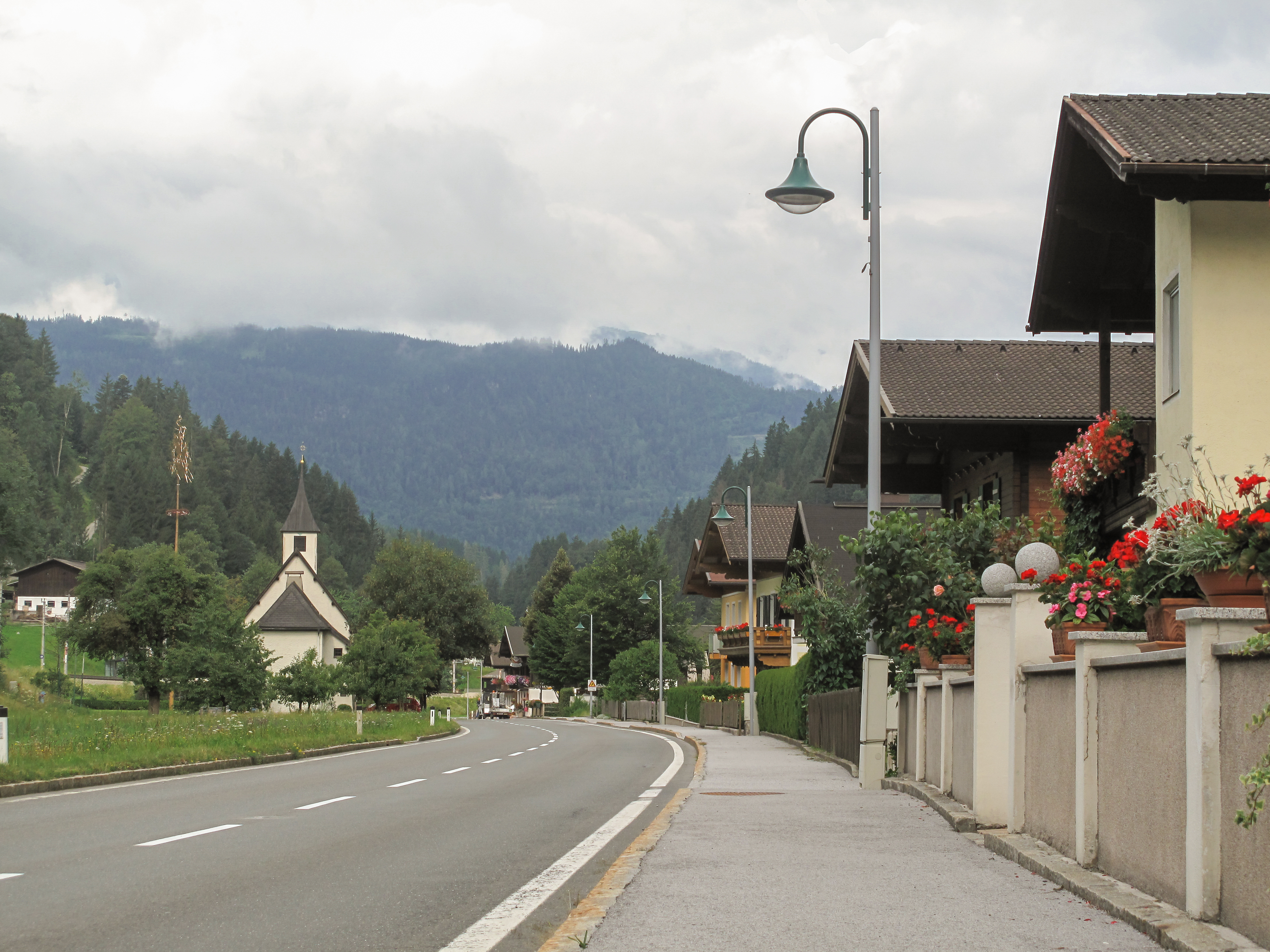
Pöham, church in the street

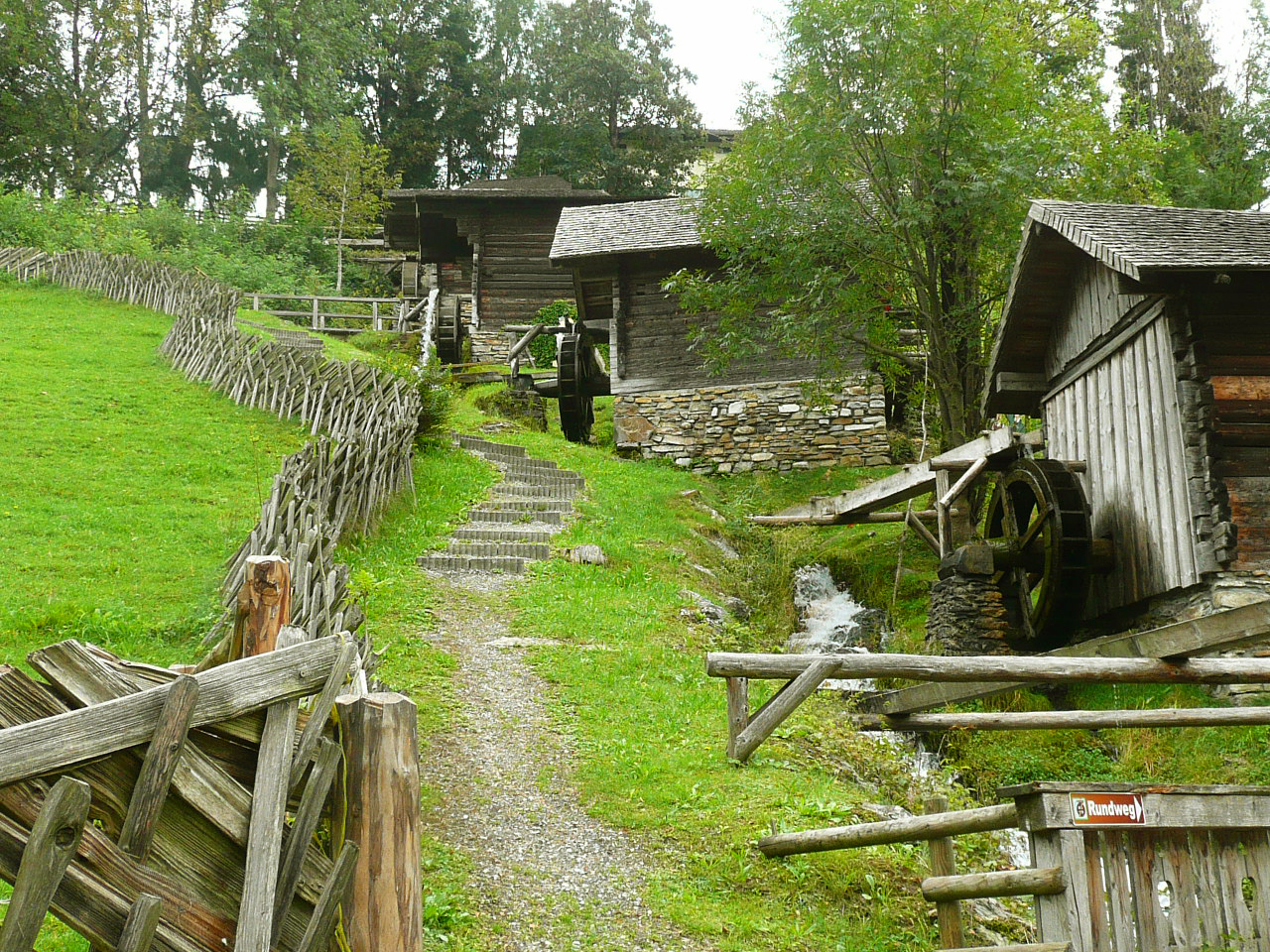
The water mills in the Open Air Museum
