= St. Veit im Pongau =

Town in Salzburg, Austria

- Municipality
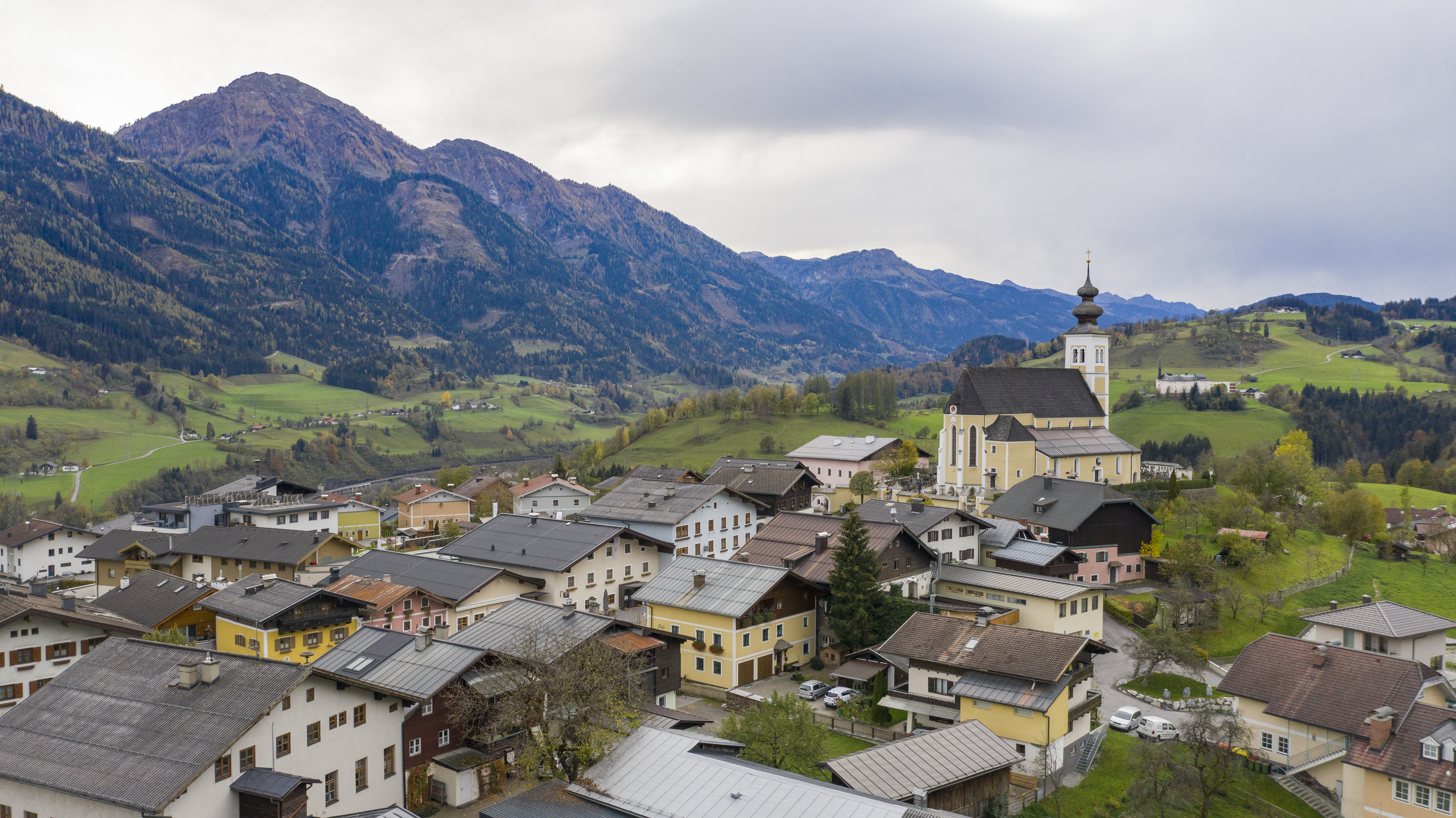

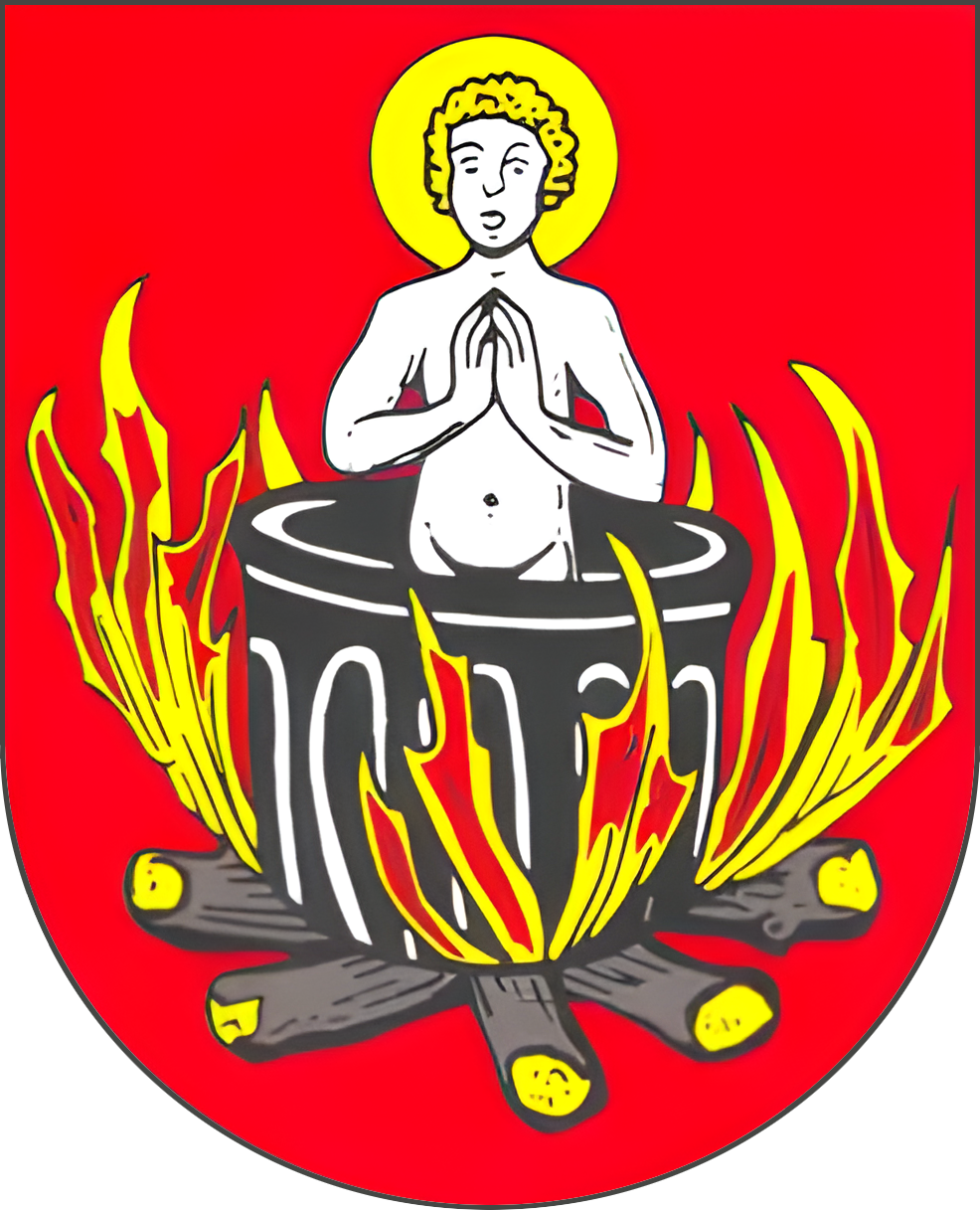
- Coat of arms

- Location within Austria
- Coordinates: 47°19′50″N 13°9′20″E
- Country: Austria
- State: Salzburg
- District: St. Johann im Pongau

Government
  - Mayor: Sebastian Pirnbacher (ÖVP)

Area
  - Total: 56.84 km^{2} (21.95 sq mi)
- Elevation: 764 m (2,507 ft)

Population (2018-01-01)
  - Total: 3,788
  - Density: 66.64/km^{2} (172.6/sq mi)
- Time zone: UTC+1 (CET)
  - Summer (DST): UTC+2 (CEST)
- Postal code: 5621
- Area code: +43 6415
- Vehicle registration: JO
- Website: www.gde-stveit.salzburg.at

St. Veit im Pongau is a market town in the St. Johann im Pongau district in the Austrian state of Salzburg. St. Veit is the first healthy climate spa town in Salzburg. Submontane to the "Hochglocker" there is the 1912 founded sanatorium. Author Thomas Bernhard was treated in there and he also wrote a book about his residence at the clinic.

== Geography ==
The municipality lies in the Pongau on the Salzach. Until Sankt Veit, the Salzach flows from west to east; after Sankt Veit, it flows north. The municipality lies on a high plateau. The climate is tempered by winds that come from the valleys to the south.
