= List of railway museums in Austria =

This is a list of railway museums in Austria.

== List ==
Name of the Line	Route	Gauge mm	T r a c k s	Length km	Worked by DC=direct current AC=altn. current	from	to	Operated by	Remarks
Burgenland
Märchenbahn	Grosspetersdorf - Rechnitz	1435	1	14,8	steam				
Carinthia
Ferlacher Bahn	Weizelsdorf - Ferlach	1435	1	5,7	steam			Nostalgiebahnen in Kärnten (NBiK)	
Gurktalbahn	Treibach-Althofen - Pöckstein	760	1	3,3	steam			Kärntner Museumsbahnen (KMB)	
Lavanttalbahn	St. Paul - Lavamünd	1435	1	12,6	diesel			Nostalgiebahnen in Kärnten (NBiK)	
Lendcanalstraßenbahn	Klagenfurt, Wörthersee	1000	1	1,0				Nostalgiebahnen in Kärnten (NBiK)	
Lower Austria
Waldbahn Nasswald	Nasswald	600	1	0,6	diesel, battery				currently closed
Höllentalbahn	Payerbach-Reichenau - Hirschwang	760	1	6,1	550 V DC			ÖGLB	
Reblaus-Express	Retz - Drosendorf	1435	1	39,8	diesel			ÖBB Erlebnisbahn	
Waldviertler Schmalspurbahnen	Gmünd NÖ - Groß Gerungs	760	1	43,1	diesel / steam			ÖBB-Erlebnisbahn	
Waldviertler Schmalspurbahnen	Gmünd NÖ - Alt Nagelberg - Litschau	760	1	25,3	diesel / steam			ÖBB-Erlebnisbahn	
Waldviertler Schmalspurbahnen	Alt Nagelberg - Heidenreichstein	760	1	13,2	diesel / steam			Waldviertler Schmalspurbahnverein (WSV)	
Ybbstalbahn-Bergstrecke	Lunz am See - Kienberg-Gaming	760	1	17,1	steam			NÖLB	
Upper Austria
Ampflwanger Bahn	Timelkam -Ampflwang	1435	1	10,4	diesel / steam			ÖGEG	
Schmalspurbahn Ampflwang	Ampflwang	760	1						
Florianerbahn	Linz Pichling - St. Florian	900	1	6,1	600 V DC			Club Florianerbahn (CFB)	currently closed
Steyrtalbahn	Steyr Lokalbahn – Grünburg	760	1	16,5	steam			ÖGEG	
Salzburg
Taurachbahn	Tamsweg - Mauterndorf	760	1	10,4	steam			Taurachbahn (TB) / Club 760	
Styria
Erzbergbahn	Vordernberg Markt - Eisenerz	1435	1	19,7	diesel			Verein Erzbergbahn	
Feistritztalbahn	Weiz - Birkfeld	760	1	23,9	diesel / steam			FTB / Club U 44	
Museumsstraßenbahn Mariazell-Erlaufsee	Mariazell - Erlaufsee	1435	1	2,5	steam, 600 V DC				
Stainzerbahn	Preding-Wieselsdorf - Stainz	760	1	11,3	steam			Marktgemeinde Stainz	
Tyrol
Wachtl-Express	Kiefersfelden - Wachtl	900	1	~4,8	1200 V DC			MEGW	
Vorarlberg
Bahn des Museums Rheinschauen	Bodensee - Lustenau- Steinbruch Kadelberg	750	1		steam, diesel, 750 V DC				
Bregenzerwaldbahn	Schwarzenberg -Bezau	760	1	5,0	diesel / steam			Verein Bregenzerwald-Museumsbahn	
