= Burgruine Edenvest =

Castle ruin in Austria

Coordinates: 47.0728°N 13.7283°E

- Salzburg, Austria
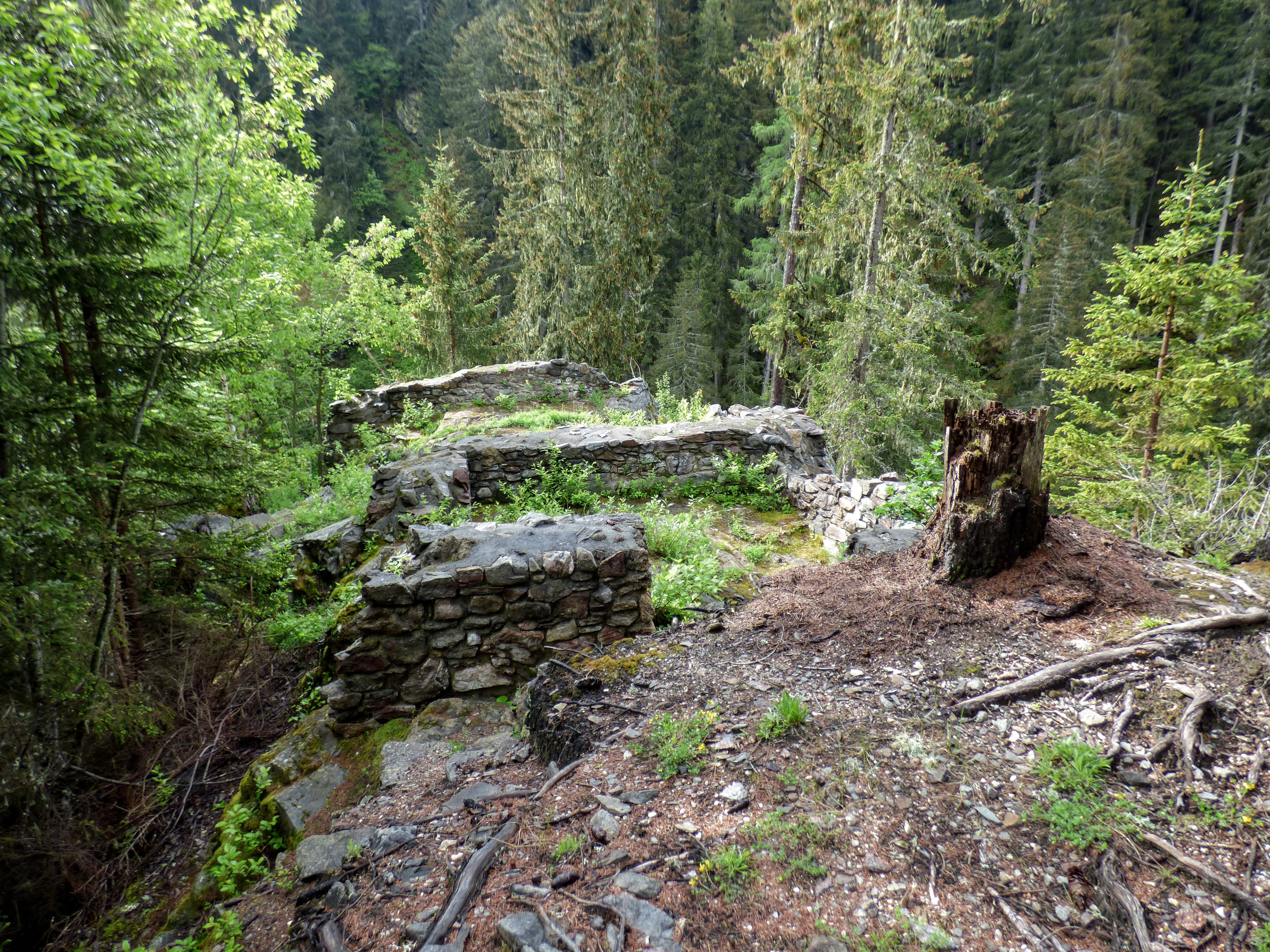

Site information
- Type: Rock castle

Site history
- Built: first mentioned 1147

Burgruine Edenvest (Edenvest castle ruins) is the ruins of a rock castle in the Thomatal municipality in the Tamsweg district of the state of Salzburg, Austria.

== See also ==
- List of castles in Austria
