= Taurach Railway =

Coordinates: 47°08′02″N 13°48′31″E

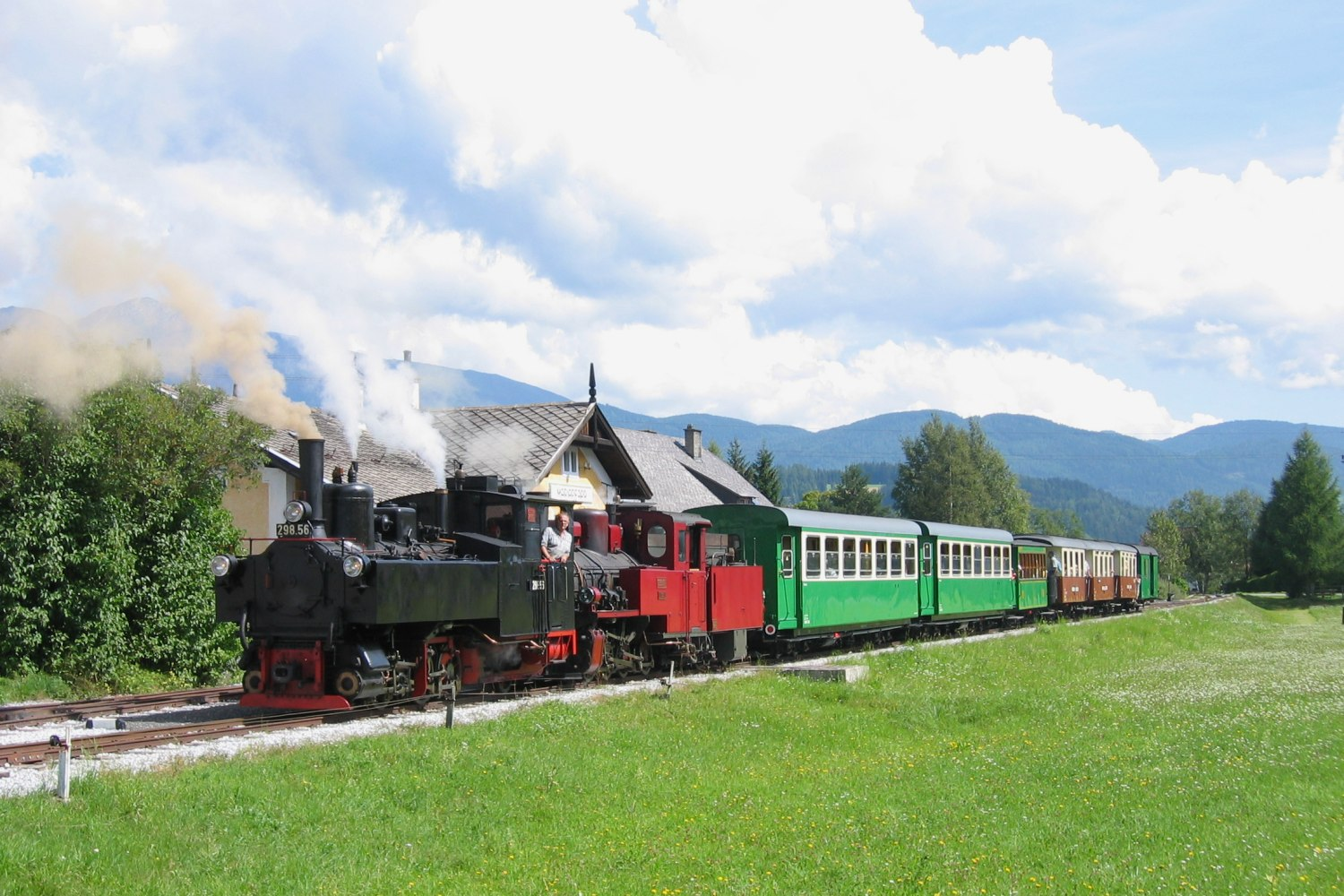
- 699.01 and 298.56 double-heading at Mariapfarr

Overview
- Native name: Taurachbahn
- Status: Seasonal museum service
- Owner: Steiermärkische Landesbahnen
- Locale: Lungau, Salzburg, Austria
- Termini: Tamsweg; Mauterndorf

Service
- Type: Heritage railway
- Operator: Taurachbahn GmbH (Club 760)

History
- Opened: 8 October 1894 (as part of the Murtalbahn)
- Closed: 31 March 1973 (passengers); 1 September 1981 (freight)
- Reopened: 9 July 1988 (heritage)

Technical
- Line length: 11.8 km (7.3 mi)
- Number of tracks: Single track
- Track gauge: 760 mm (2 ft 5 15/16 in)
- Highest elevation: 1,116 m (3,661 ft) (Mauterndorf)

he Taurach Railway (German: Taurachbahn) is a 760 mm (2 ft 5 15/16 in) narrow-gauge museum railway in the Lungau region of the Austrian state of Salzburg. It uses the upper end of the Murtalbahn between Tamsweg and Mauterndorf and has been run by the association Club 760 since 1988.

== History ==
The line opened on 8 October 1894 as the western end of the Murtalbahn from Unzmarkt. Because of low patronage, passenger services between Tamsweg and Mauterndorf were withdrawn on 31 March 1973. On 9 June 1980 a lorry too tall to pass under the railway bridge at St. Andrä lifted the bridge off its bearings and cut the line; the remaining freight traffic ended on 1 September 1981.

Club 760 leased the section from 1 April 1982. Repairs to the bridge were finished in June 1983, and in August 1983 locomotive 699.01 crossed it on its transfer to Mauterndorf. West of St. Andrä, about 650 m (2,130 ft) of the old alignment had to be removed after land consolidation, so club volunteers built a new alignment in 1984 and 1985; the first special train ran over it in October 1985. The district authority in Tamsweg licensed tourist passenger operation on 8 February 1988, and the Taurach Railway opened on 9 July 1988. It operates on summer weekends.

== The route ==
The line begins at Mauterndorf station and runs along the Taurach through Gröbendorf stop to Mariapfarr station. From there the route goes through Lintsching stop to St. Andrä-Andlwirt, which is the terminus for passenger traffic.

Beyond St. Andrä-Andlwirt the line continues about 1 km (0.62 mi) east to a derailer at Murtalbahn km 65.650, the boundary with the Murtalbahn towards Tamsweg. At St. Andrä-Wölting, the switch of a former industrial siding was kept and a short stub track laid, so that museum trains can run round there. This section is also used to transfer rolling stock between the two railways.

Regular museum trains do not run into Tamsweg station because of the access fees charged by Steiermarkbahn und Bus, but special trains occasionally run through between the Murtalbahn and Mauterndorf.

== Infrastructure ==
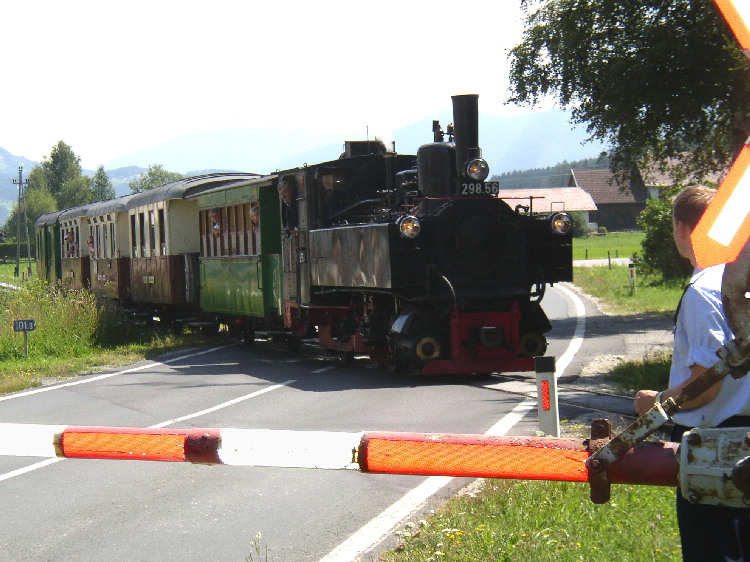
One of the level crossings on the Taurach Railway in 2002.

The major station on the railway is Mauterndorf, where there is a boiler house and workshop, and also a wagon-works constructed in 1999 with the assistance of a European Union grant. After passing through Mariapfarr the line crosses the Taurach, and Lignitzbach rivers, and then local highway L248. After St. Andrä-Andlwirt the railway crosses the Göriachbach river, local highway L222, and then finally the Lessachbach river.

The railway crossings on the federal highway at Mariapfarr station and the local highway at Lintsching stop are secured by barriers, which must be closed and opened by the train crew by hand. There are many crossings at local dirt roads, which are secured by speed limits, St Andrews crosses and/or stop boards.

== Rolling stock ==
Steam locomotives 298,56, 699,01, StLB 6 are used to operate the railway, and in 2004 locomotive 12 from a salt mine railway was obtained. Diesel locomotives 2091,03 and SKGLB D40 are also used, as well as three smaller diesel locomotives and a hand trolley for work trips. Several historic railway carriages are used for passenger traffic. In the goods yard are a number of goods wagons, several of which are used for maintenance on the railway.

== Operation ==
The railway operates on Saturday and Sunday afternoons from the middle of June to in the middle of September, in the mornings in July and August and on Friday afternoons from middle of July to the middle of August. The railway is operated completely by those voluntary members from Club 760.

part 1: H Mauterndorf-St.Andrä

part 2

part 3: St.Andrä-Mauterndorf
