= Superheater =

Technique for increasing the temperature of steam to improve steam engine efficiency

A superheater is a device used to convert saturated steam or wet steam into superheated steam or dry steam. Superheated steam is used in steam turbines for electricity generation, in some steam engines, and in processes such as steam reforming. There are three types of superheaters: radiant, convection, and separately fired. A superheater can vary in size from a few tens of feet to several hundred feet (a few metres to some hundred metres).

== Types ==
- A radiant superheater is placed directly in the radiant zone of the combustion chamber near the water wall so as to absorb heat by radiation.
- A convection superheater is located in the convective zone of the furnace, in the path of the hot flue gases, usually ahead of an economizer. A convection superheater is also called a primary superheater.
- A separately fired superheater is a superheater that is placed outside the main boiler and has its own separate combustion system. This superheater design incorporates additional burners in the area of superheater pipes. It is rarely, if ever, used because of its poor efficiency and the fact that the quality of the steam produced is no better than that from other superheater types.

== Steam turbines ==
A simplified diagram of a coal-fired thermal power station. The superheater is the element 19.

In many applications, a turbine will make more efficient use of steam energy than a reciprocating engine. However, saturated ("wet") steam at boiling point may contain, or condense into, liquid water droplets, which can cause damage to turbine blades. Therefore, steam turbine engines typically superheat the steam, usually within the primary boiler, to ensure that no liquid water enters the system and damages the blades.

== Steam engines ==
In a steam engine, the superheater further heats the steam generated by the boiler, increasing its thermal energy and decreasing the likelihood that it will condense inside the engine. Superheaters increase the thermal efficiency of the steam engine, and have been widely adopted. Steam which has been superheated is known as superheated steam, and non-superheated steam is called saturated steam or wet steam. From the early 20th century, superheaters were applied to many steam locomotives, to most steam vehicles, and to stationary steam engines. It is still used in conjunction with steam turbines in electrical power generating stations throughout the world.

=== Locomotives ===
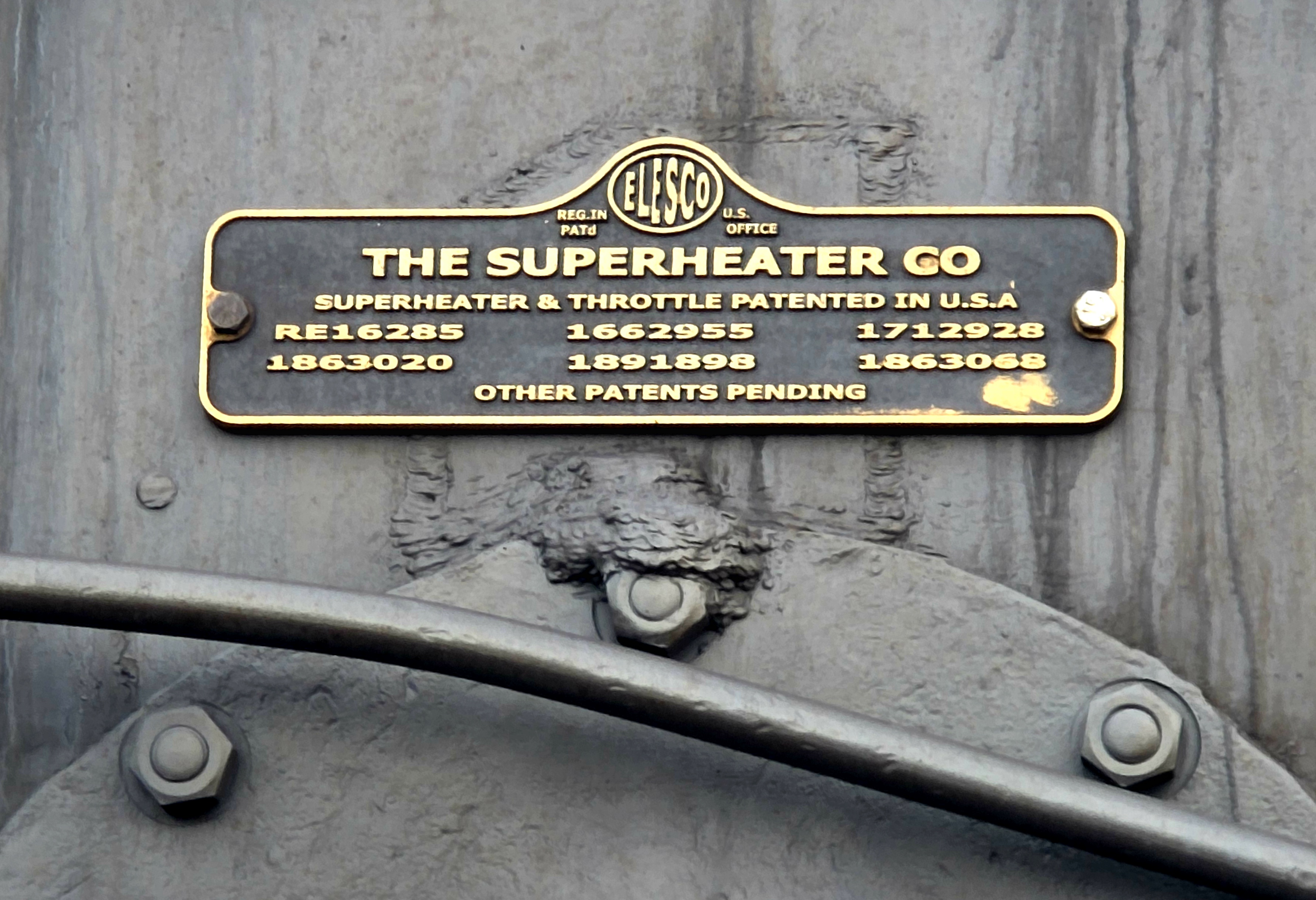
Manufacturer's information plate for The Superheater Company on the Union Pacific 4014 steam locomotive.

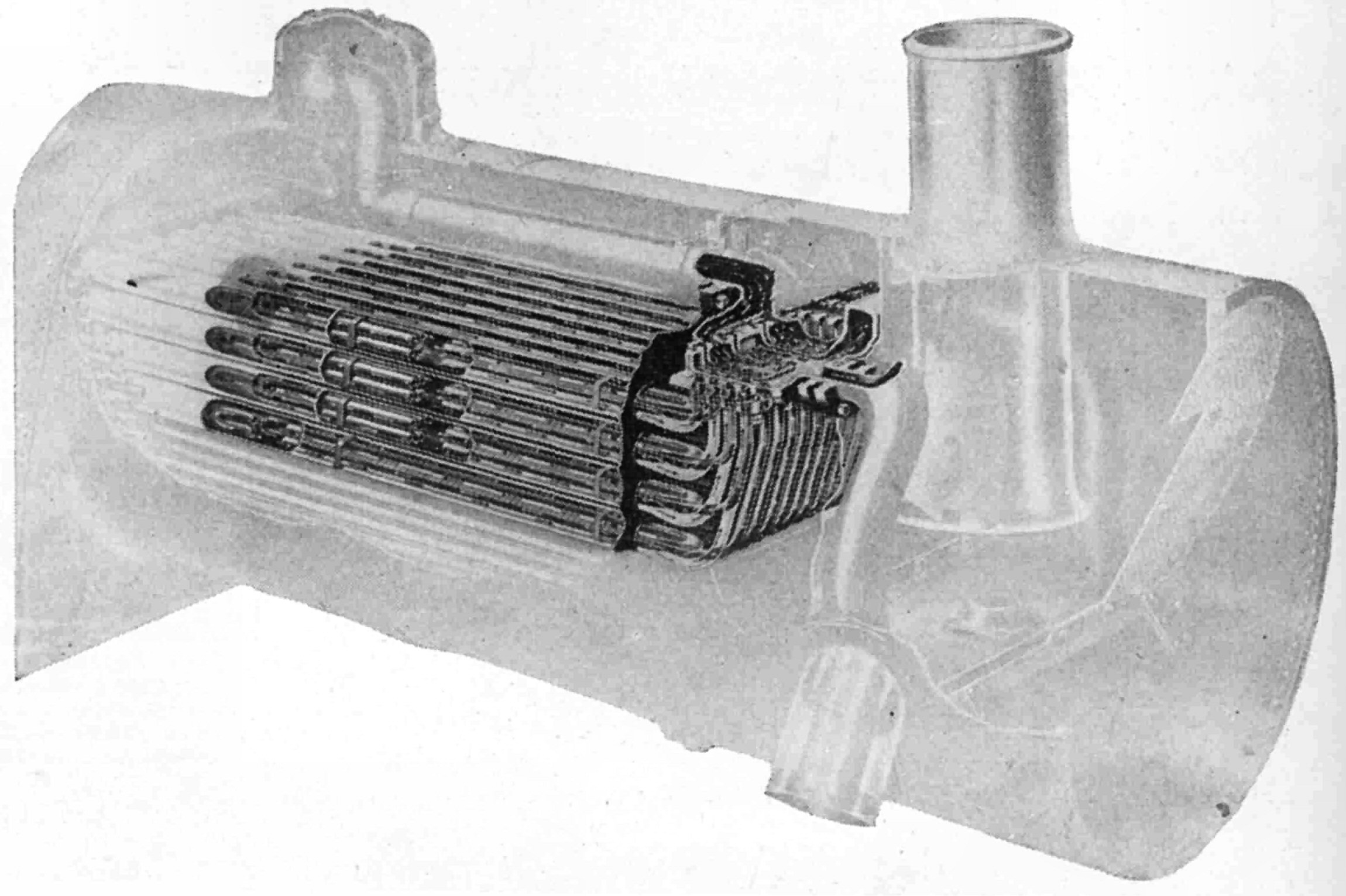
General arrangement of a superheater installation in a steam locomotive.

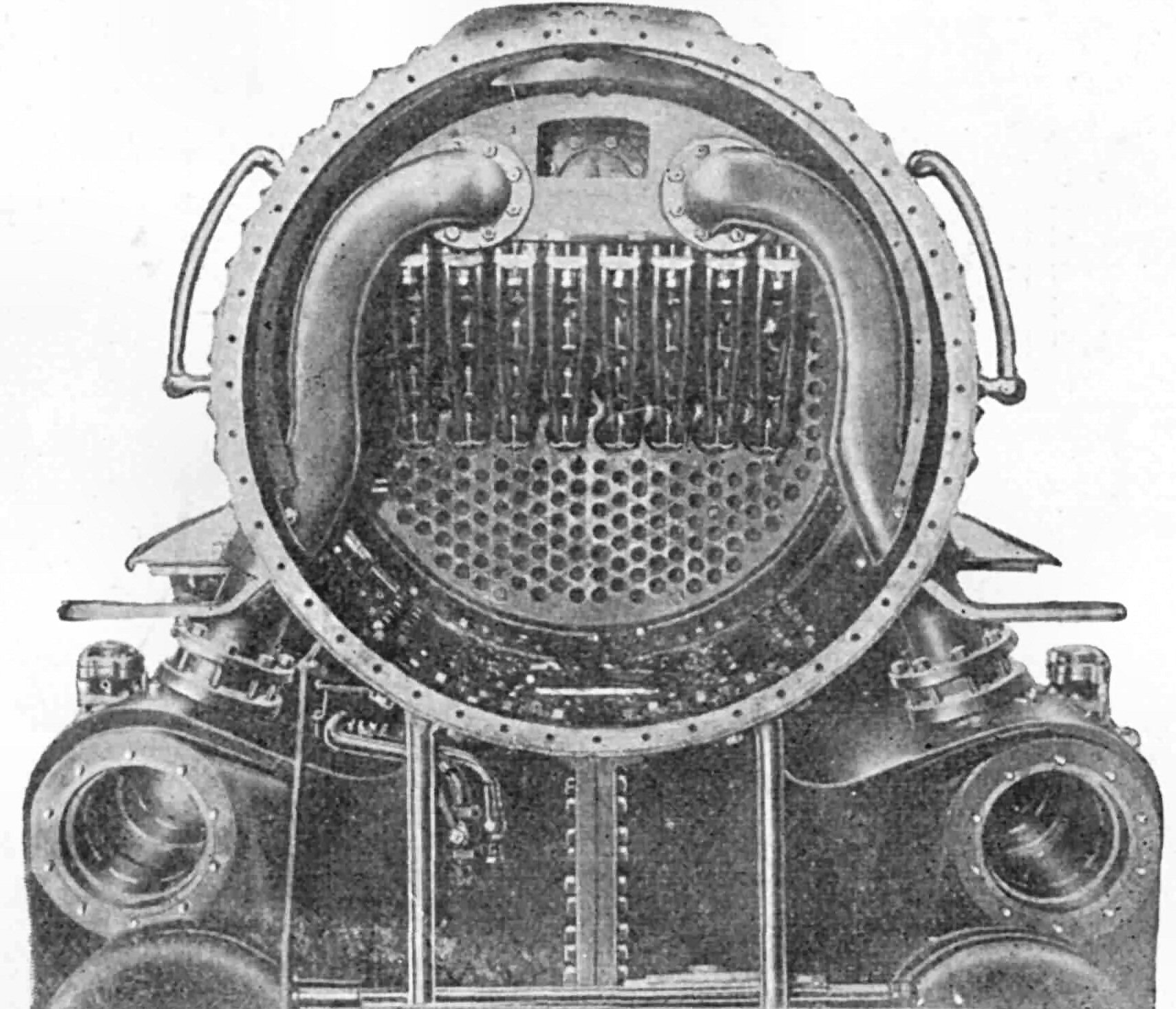
Superheater viewed from the smokebox. Top centre is the superheater header, with pipes leading to cylinders. Tubes below feed steam into and out of the superheater elements within the flues. The stack and the damper have been removed for clarity.

In steam locomotive use, by far the most common form of superheater is the fire-tube type. That takes the saturated steam supplied in the dry pipe into a superheater header mounted against the tube sheet in the smokebox. The steam is then passed through a number of superheater elements, which are long pipes placed inside the larger diameter fire tubes, called flues. Hot combustion gases from the locomotive's fire pass through the flues and, as well as heating the water in the surrounding boiler, they heat the steam inside the superheater elements they flow over. The superheater element doubles back on itself so that the heated steam can return. Most do that twice at the fire end and once at the smokebox end, so that the steam travels a distance of four times the header's length while being heated. At the end of its journey through the elements, the superheated steam passes into a separate compartment of the superheater header and then to the cylinders of the engine.

==== Damper and snifting valve ====
The steam passing through the superheater elements cools their metal and prevents them from melting, but when the throttle closes that cooling effect is absent, and so a damper closes in the smokebox to cut off the flow through the flues and prevent them being damaged. Some locomotives, particularly on the London and North Eastern Railway, were fitted with snifting valves, which admitted air to the superheater when the locomotive was coasting. That kept the superheater elements relatively cooler and the cylinders warm. The snifting valve can be seen behind the chimney on many LNER locomotives.

==== Front-end throttle ====
A superheater increases the distance between the throttle and the cylinders in the steam circuit and thus reduces the immediacy of throttle action. To counteract that, some later steam locomotives were fitted with a front-end throttle, placed in the smokebox after the superheater. Such locomotives can sometimes be identified by an external throttle rod that stretches the whole length of the boiler, with a crank on the outside of the smokebox. That arrangement also allows superheated steam to be used for auxiliary appliances, such as the dynamo and air pumps. Another benefit of the front-end throttle is that superheated steam is immediately available. With a dome throttle, it takes some time before the super heater actually provides an efficiency benefit.

==== Cylinder valves ====
Locomotives with superheaters are usually fitted with piston valves or poppet valves, because it is difficult to keep a slide valve properly lubricated at high temperature.

==== Applications ====
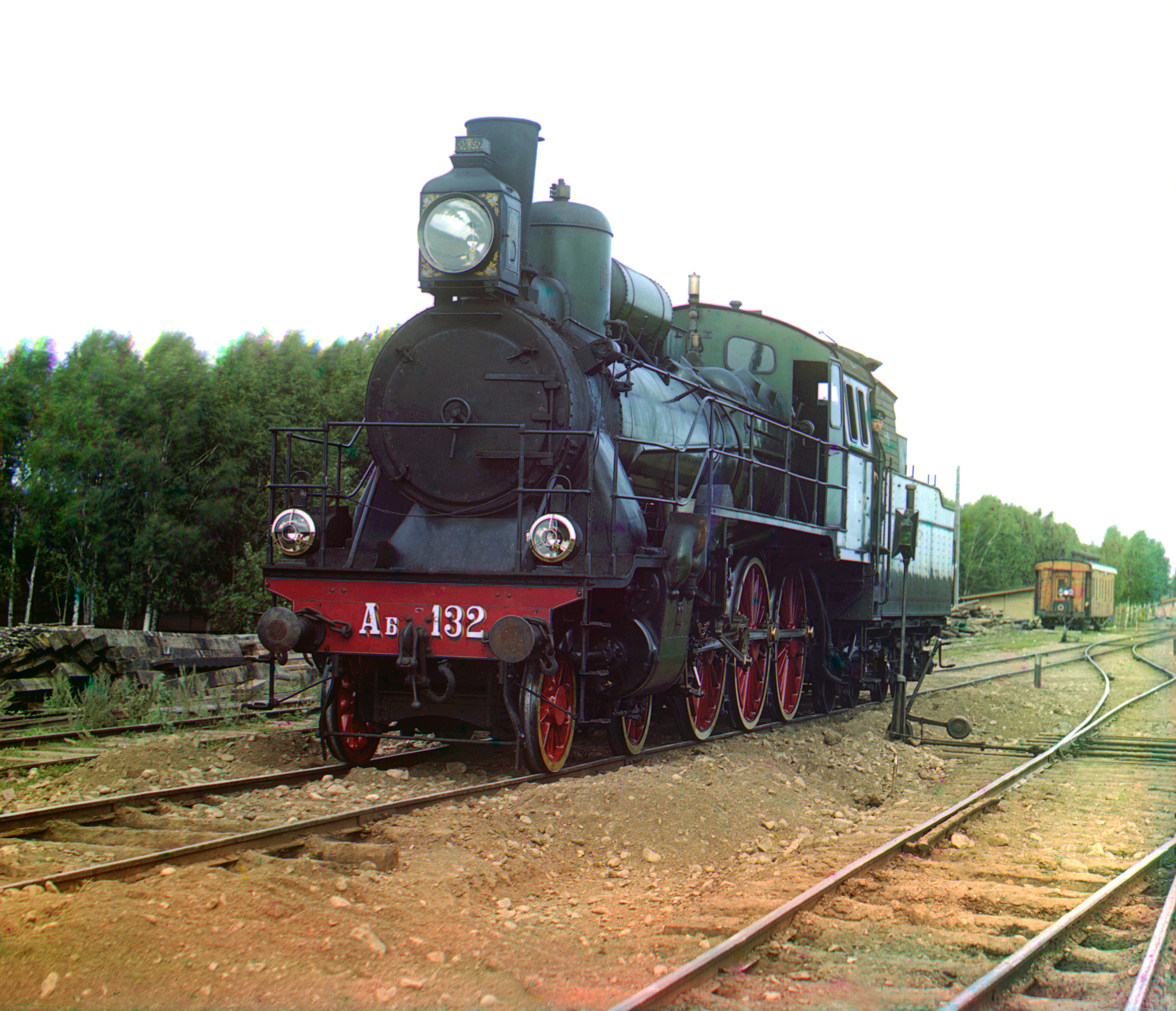
Early color photograph from Russia taken by Sergey Prokudin-Gorsky in 1910 of steam locomotive with a superheater

The first practical superheater was developed in Germany by Wilhelm Schmidt during the 1880s and 1890s. The Prussian S 4 locomotive, with an early form of superheater, was built in 1898, and more were produced in series from 1902. The benefits of the invention were demonstrated in the UK by the Great Western Railway (GWR) in 1906. The GWR Chief Mechanical Engineer, G. J. Churchward, believed that the Schmidt type could be bettered, and the design and testing of an indigenous Swindon type was undertaken, culminating in the Swindon No. 3 superheater in 1909. Douglas Earle Marsh carried out a series of comparative tests between members of his I3 class using saturated steam and those fitted with the Schmidt superheater between October 1907 and March 1910, proving the advantages of the latter in terms of performance and efficiency.

Improved superheaters were introduced by John G. Robinson of the Great Central Railway at Gorton Locomotive Works, by Robert Urie of the London and South Western Railway (LSWR) at Eastleigh Works, and Richard Maunsell of the Southern Railway, also at Eastleigh.

The oldest surviving steam locomotives with a superheater, as well as being the first narrow gauge locomotive with a superheater, is the Bh.1 owned by Steiermärkische Landesbahnen (STLB) in Austria, which runs excursions trains on the Mur Valley Railroad.

===== Urie's "Eastleigh" superheater =====
Robert Urie's design of superheater for the LSWR was the product of experience with his H15 class 4-6-0 locomotives. In anticipation of performance trials, eight examples were fitted with Schmidt and Robinson superheaters, and two others remained saturated. However, World War I intervened before the trials could take place, although an LSWR Locomotive Committee report from late 1915 noted that the Robinson version returned the best fuel efficiency. It consumed an average of 48.35 lb (21.9 kg) coal per mile over an average distance of 39,824 mi (64,090.5 km), compared to 48.42 lb (22.0 kg) and 59.05 lb (26.8 kg) coal for the Schmidt and saturated examples respectively.

However, the report stated that both superheater types had serious drawbacks. The Schmidt system featured a damper control on the superheater header that caused hot gases to condense into sulfuric acid, which caused pitting and subsequent weakening of the superheater elements. Leakage of gases was also commonplace between the elements and the header, and maintenance was difficult without removal of the horizontally-arranged assembly. The Robinson version suffered from temperature variations caused by saturated and superheated steam chambers being adjacent, causing material stress, and had similar access problems as the Schmidt type.

The report's recommendations enabled Urie to design a new type of superheater with separate saturated steam headers above and below the superheater header. They were connected by elements beginning at the saturated header, running through the flue tubes and back to the superheater header, and the whole assembly was vertically arranged for ease of maintenance. The device was highly successful in service, but was heavy and expensive to construct.

==== Advantages and disadvantages ====
The main advantages of using a superheater are reduced fuel and water consumption but there is a price to pay in increased maintenance costs. In most cases the benefits outweighed the costs and superheaters became widely used, although British shunting locomotives (switchers) were rarely fitted with superheaters. In locomotives used for mineral traffic the advantages seem to have been marginal. For example, the North Eastern Railway fitted superheaters to some of its NER Class P mineral locomotives but later began to remove them.

Without careful maintenance, superheaters are prone to a particular type of hazardous failure, involving the superheater tubes bursting at their U-shaped turns. They are difficult to manufacture, and to test when installed, and a rupture causes the superheated high-pressure steam to escape into the large flues, back to the fire and into the locomotive cab, creating extreme danger for the locomotive crew.
