= Fuchsberger =

Fuchsberger is a German surname and may refer to:

- Franz Fuchsberger (1910–1992), Austrian footballer
- Fuxi Fuchsberger, Austrian skier
- Joachim Fuchsberger (1927–2014), German actor, television host, lyricist and businessman
- Sebastian Fuchsberger (born 1971), Austrian musician
