= Burkhard von Weisbriach =

German Roman Catholic cardinal and Prince-Archbishop of Salzburg

Burkhard von Weisbriach (1420/23–1466) was a German Roman Catholic cardinal and Prince-Archbishop of Salzburg from 1461 until his death.

== Biography ==
He was probably born at Weißpriach Castle in the Salzburg Lungau region about 1420 or 1423, the son of Burkhard von Weisbriach the Elder and Anna of Liechtenstein-Kastelkorn. The Lords of Weißbriach had served as ministeriales and local administrators of the Salzburg archbishops for centuries. Burkhard enrolled in the University of Vienna in 1437, studying theology and law. After he completed his education, he traveled to Rome, where he became a protonotary apostolic.

He became a canon of Salzburg Cathedral in 1448 and its provost in 1452. Throughout the 1450s, he served as an envoy from the Habsburg emperor Frederick III and his brother Archduke Albert VI of Austria to the court of Pope Nicholas V in Rome. He repeatedly tried to alleviate the ongoing fratricidal conflict between the Habsburg rulers, though to no avail. In March 1459, the emperor sent him to Siena to congratulate Pope Pius II on his recent election to the papacy. In November, he intervened in the Council of Mantua. In the conflict of Cardinal Nicholas of Cusa, Prince-Bishop of Brixen with Archduke Siegmund of Austria-Tyrol, he likewise sided with the Habsburg dynasty.

In the secret consistory celebrated in Siena on 5 March 1460, Pope Pius II made him a cardinal. His appointment as a cardinal was announced in the consistory held in Viterbo on 31 May 1462, and he received the titular church of Santi Nereo e Achilleo at that time. He did not participate in the papal conclave of 1464 that elected Pope Paul II.

On 16 November 1461, the cathedral chapter of Salzburg Cathedral unanimously selected him as the new Prince-Archbishop of Salzburg. Pope Pius II confirmed his election on 15 January 1462 and sent the pallium on 18 January 1462. Weisbriach took possession of the archbishopric on 23 January 1462. He was consecrated as a bishop by Ulrich II of Plankenfels, Bishop of Chiemsee, on 9 May 1462. Burkhard turned out to be a strong proponent of nepotism granting several governmental offices to his relatives. In the summer of 1462, he sparked a tax revolt in the Archbishopric after he had quadrupled rents in some areas. The violence was most pronounced in the Pongau, Pinzgau, and Brixental. The dispute was eventually settled through the mediation of Duke Louis IX of Bavaria.

The cardinal had Hohensalzburg Castle and the Salzburg town fortifications significantly enlarged. In 1465, he founded an Augustinian collegiate church in Mülln.

He died in Salzburg on 16 February 1466 and was buried in Salzburg Cathedral.
