= St. Margarethen im Lungau =

Municipality in Salzburg, Austria

- Municipality
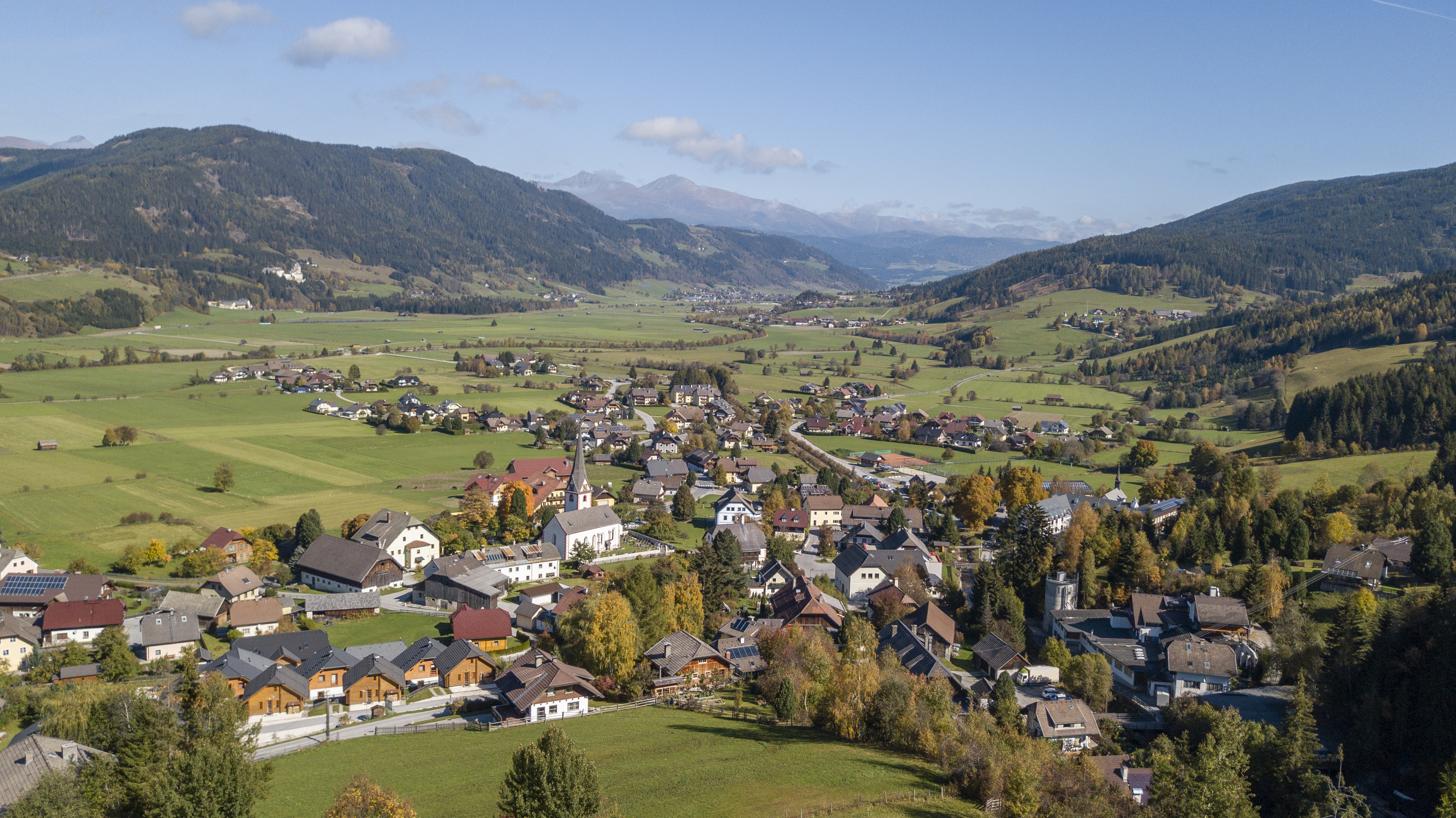

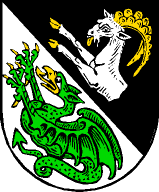
- Coat of arms

- Location within Austria
- Coordinates: 47°04′47″N 13°41′43″E
- Country: Austria
- State: Salzburg
- District: Tamsweg

Government
  - Mayor: Johann Lüftenegger (ÖVP)

Area
  - Total: 24.47 km^{2} (9.45 sq mi)
- Elevation: 1,065 m (3,494 ft)

Population (2018-01-01)
  - Total: 725
  - Density: 29.6/km^{2} (76.7/sq mi)
- Time zone: UTC+1 (CET)
  - Summer (DST): UTC+2 (CEST)
- Postal code: 5581
- Area code: +43 6476
- Vehicle registration: TA
- Website: www.st.margarethen.salzburg.at

St. Margarethen im Lungau is a municipality in the district of Tamsweg in the state of Salzburg in Austria.
