= St. Andrä im Lungau =

- Municipality
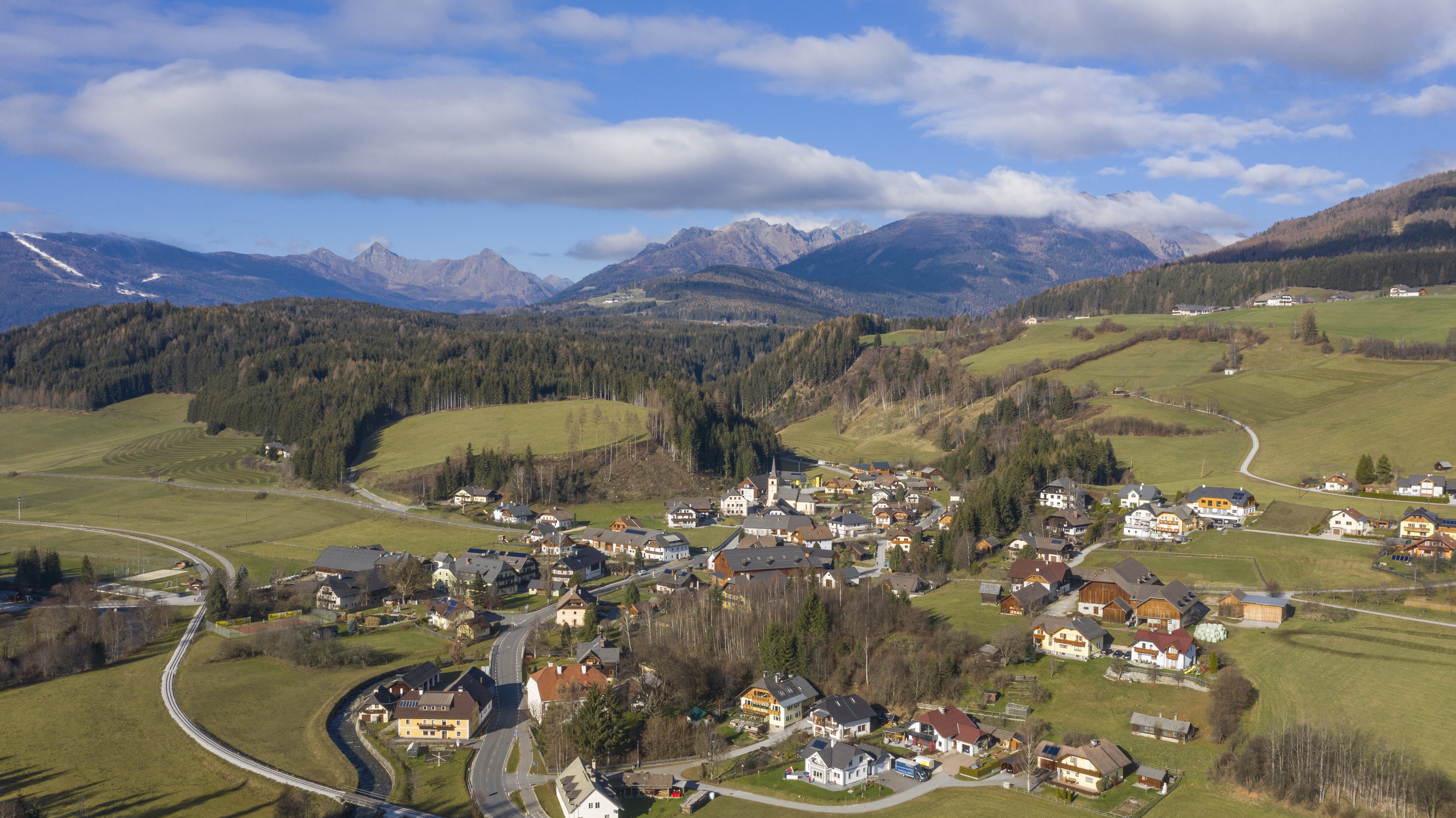

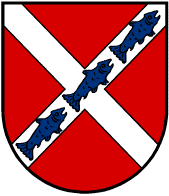
- Coat of arms

- Location within Austria
- Coordinates: 47°08′56″N 13°47′49″E
- Country: Austria
- State: Salzburg
- District: Tamsweg

Government
  - Mayor: Heinrich Perner (ÖVP)

Area
  - Total: 10.5 km^{2} (4.1 sq mi)
- Elevation: 1,055 m (3,461 ft)

Population (2018-01-01)
  - Total: 761
  - Density: 72.5/km^{2} (188/sq mi)
- Time zone: UTC+1 (CET)
  - Summer (DST): UTC+2 (CEST)
- Postal code: 5572
- Area code: +43 6474
- Vehicle registration: TA
- Website: www.st-andrae.salzburg.at

St. Andrä im Lungau is a municipality in the district of Tamsweg in the state of Salzburg in Austria.

== See also ==
- Salzburg
- Salzburgerland
