= Lessach =

- Municipality
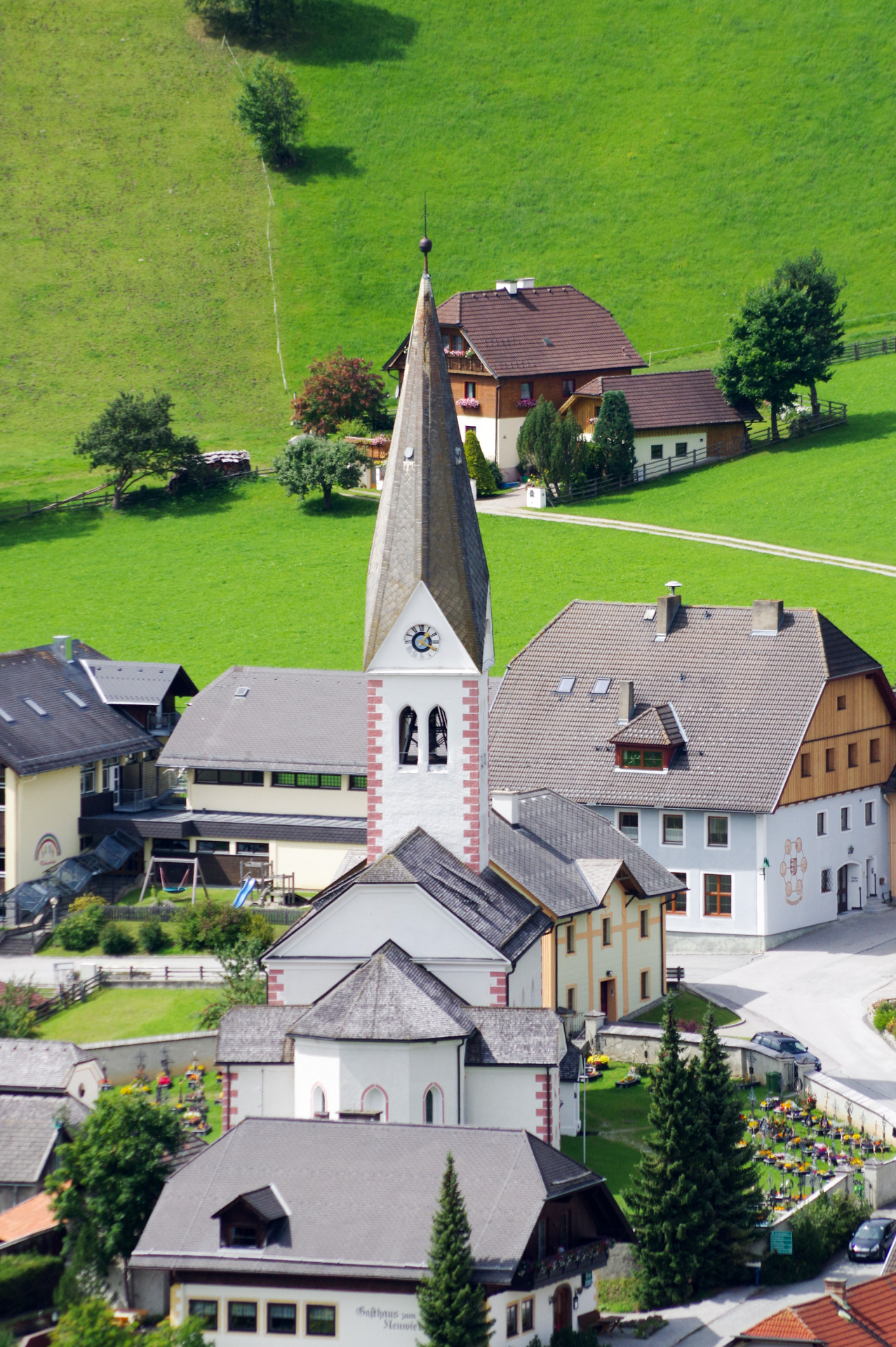
- Church of Saint Paul

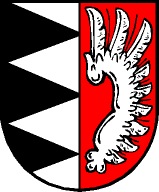
- Coat of arms

- Location within Austria
- Coordinates: 47°11′00″N 13°48′00″E
- Country: Austria
- State: Salzburg
- District: Tamsweg

Government
  - Mayor: Peter Perner (ÖVP)

Area
  - Total: 72.23 km^{2} (27.89 sq mi)
- Elevation: 1,208 m (3,963 ft)

Population (2018-01-01)
  - Total: 555
  - Density: 7.68/km^{2} (19.9/sq mi)
- Time zone: UTC+1 (CET)
  - Summer (DST): UTC+2 (CEST)
- Postal code: 5575
- Area code: +43 6484
- Vehicle registration: TA
- Website: www.lessach.at

Lessach is a municipality in the district of Tamsweg in the state of Salzburg in Austria.
