= Muhr =

- Municipality
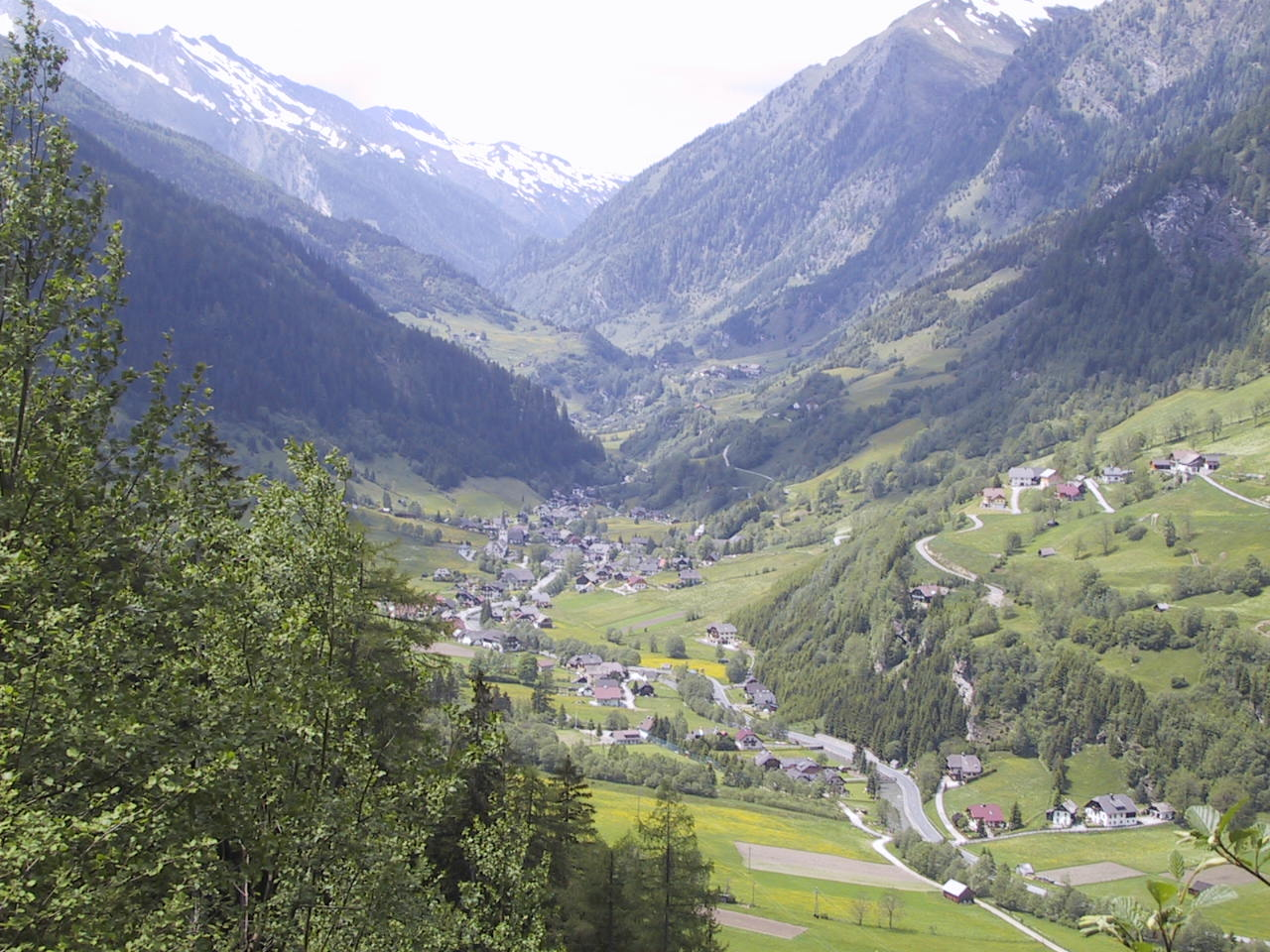
- Mur valley

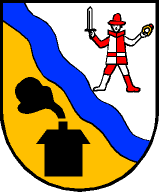
- Coat of arms

- Location within Austria
- Coordinates: 47°05′00″N 13°29′00″E
- Country: Austria
- State: Salzburg
- District: Tamsweg

Government
  - Mayor: Ernst Josef Kandler (SPÖ)

Area
  - Total: 115.96 km^{2} (44.77 sq mi)
- Elevation: 1,107 m (3,632 ft)

Population (2018-01-01)
  - Total: 510
  - Density: 4.4/km^{2} (11/sq mi)
- Time zone: UTC+1 (CET)
  - Summer (DST): UTC+2 (CEST)
- Postal code: 5583
- Area code: 06479
- Vehicle registration: TA
- Website: www.muhr.gv.at

Muhr is a municipality of the Tamsweg District in the Austrian state of Salzburg.

== Geography ==
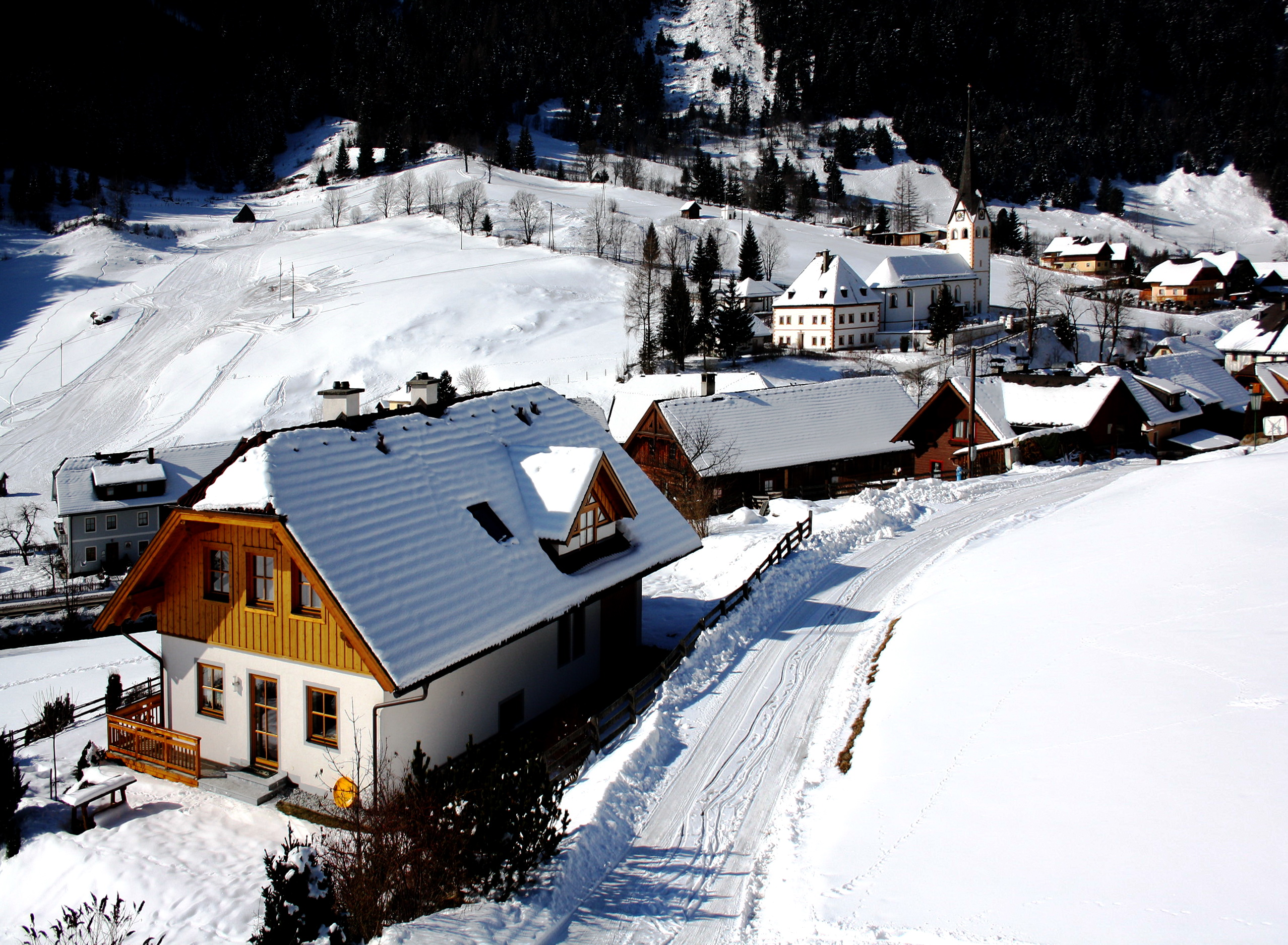
Main road and parish church

It is located in a southwestern valley of the Salzburg Lungau region at the source of the river Mur River, between the Hohe Tauern and the Niedere Tauern ranges of the Central Eastern Alps. The mountains of the Ankogel Group in the south separate it from the state of Carinthia.

The municipal area comprises the Katastralgemeinden of Vordermuhr, Hintermuhr, and Schellgaden. In the west it adjoins the Hohe Tauern national park.

== History ==
Like the eponymous river, its name may derive from Proto-Celtic mori, 'water' (compare Welsh môr or English mere). The Lungau region belonged to the Prince-Archbishopric of Salzburg until its secularisation in 1803. The settlement was first mentioned about 1470, the St. Rupert Church in a 1523 deed. Muhr once was a mining area for gold and arsenic.

A local custom is the annual procession with Prangstangen, up to 8 m (26 ft) high wooden poles which are decorated with flowers and carried by local bachelors on the Feast of Saints Peter and Paul, June 29 into the church. Muhr is also known for its Samson parades.

In some countries there is a tribe called Muhur, with other spelling variations like Muhr, Mohor, Mouhur. So the name of the place could have other origins.

== Politics ==
Seats in the municipal council (Gemeinderat) as of 2009 elections:

- Austrian People's Party (ÖVP): 4
- Social Democratic Party of Austria (SPÖ): 4
- Freedom Party of Austria (FPÖ): 1
