= Mauterndorf =

Mauterndorf Mautndorf
- Municipality
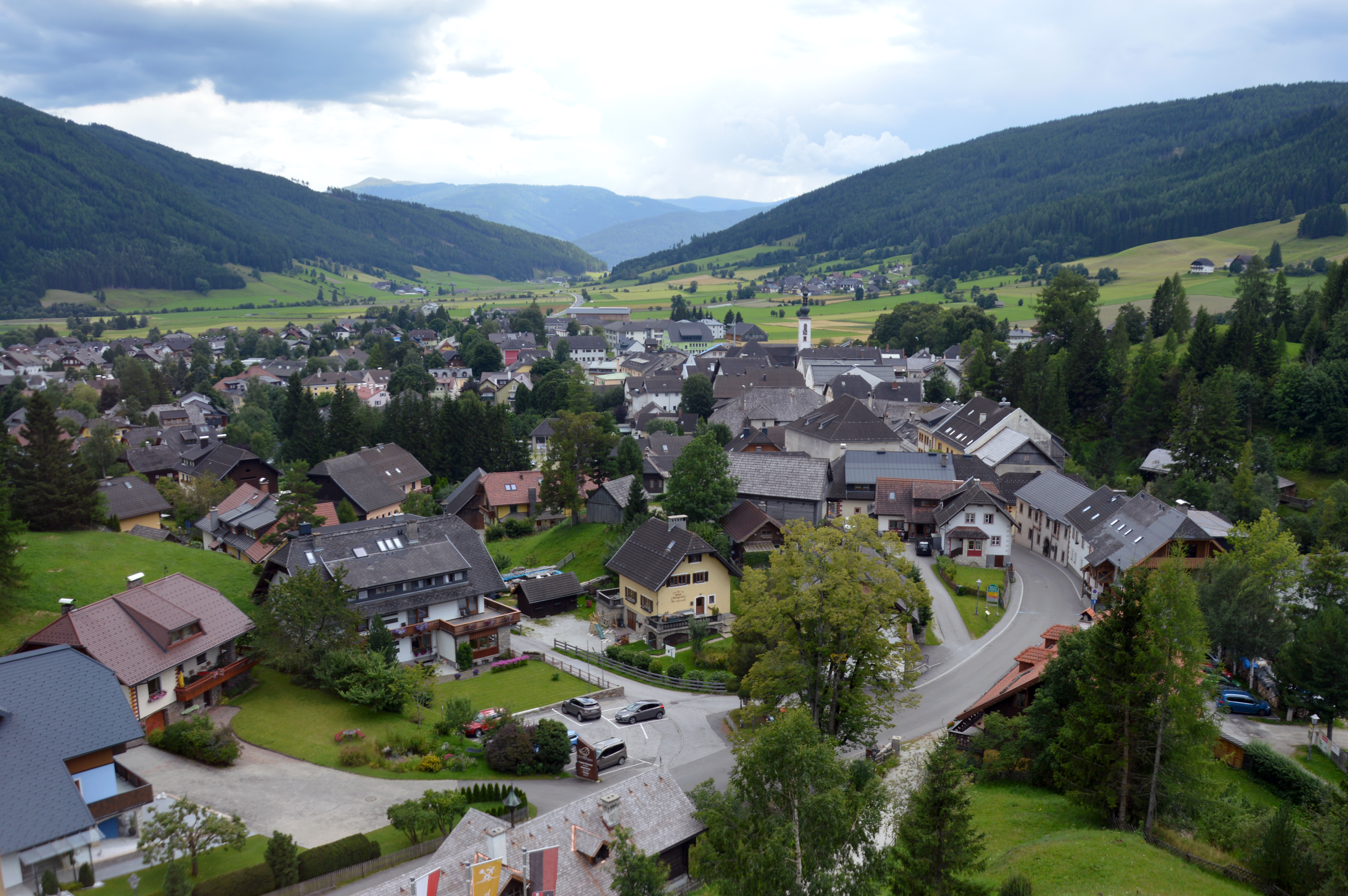
- View of Mauterndorf from the castle tower of Burg Mauterndorf

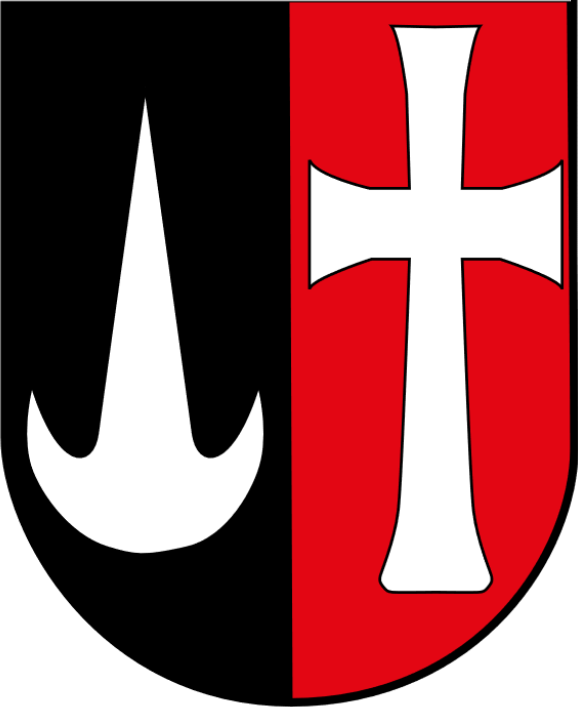
- Coat of arms

- Location within Austria
- Coordinates: 47°07′57″N 13°41′49″E
- Country: Austria
- State: Salzburg
- District: Tamsweg

Government
  - Mayor: Herbert Eßl (ÖVP)

Area
  - Total: 32.71 km^{2} (12.63 sq mi)
- Elevation: 1,123 m (3,684 ft)

Population (2018-01-01)
  - Total: 1,639
  - Density: 50.11/km^{2} (129.8/sq mi)
- Time zone: UTC+1 (CET)
  - Summer (DST): UTC+2 (CEST)
- Postal code: 5570
- Area code: 06472
- Vehicle registration: TA
- Website: www.mauterndorf.salzburg.at

Mauterndorf (Southern Bavarian: Mautndorf) is a market town of the Tamsweg District in the Austrian state of Salzburg. The municipality also comprises the Katastralgemeinden Faningberg, Neuseß and Steindorf.

== Geography ==
It is located in the centre of the Salzburg Lungau region, in the valley of the Southern Taurach River, a tributary of the Mur rising at the Radstädter Tauern Pass. In the north, the Niedere Tauern range forms a part of the main chain of the Alps. In the south, the Katschberg Roads via Sankt Michael leads to the Tauern Autobahn and the Katschberg Pass, crossing the Hohe Tauern range towards Carinthia.

== History ==
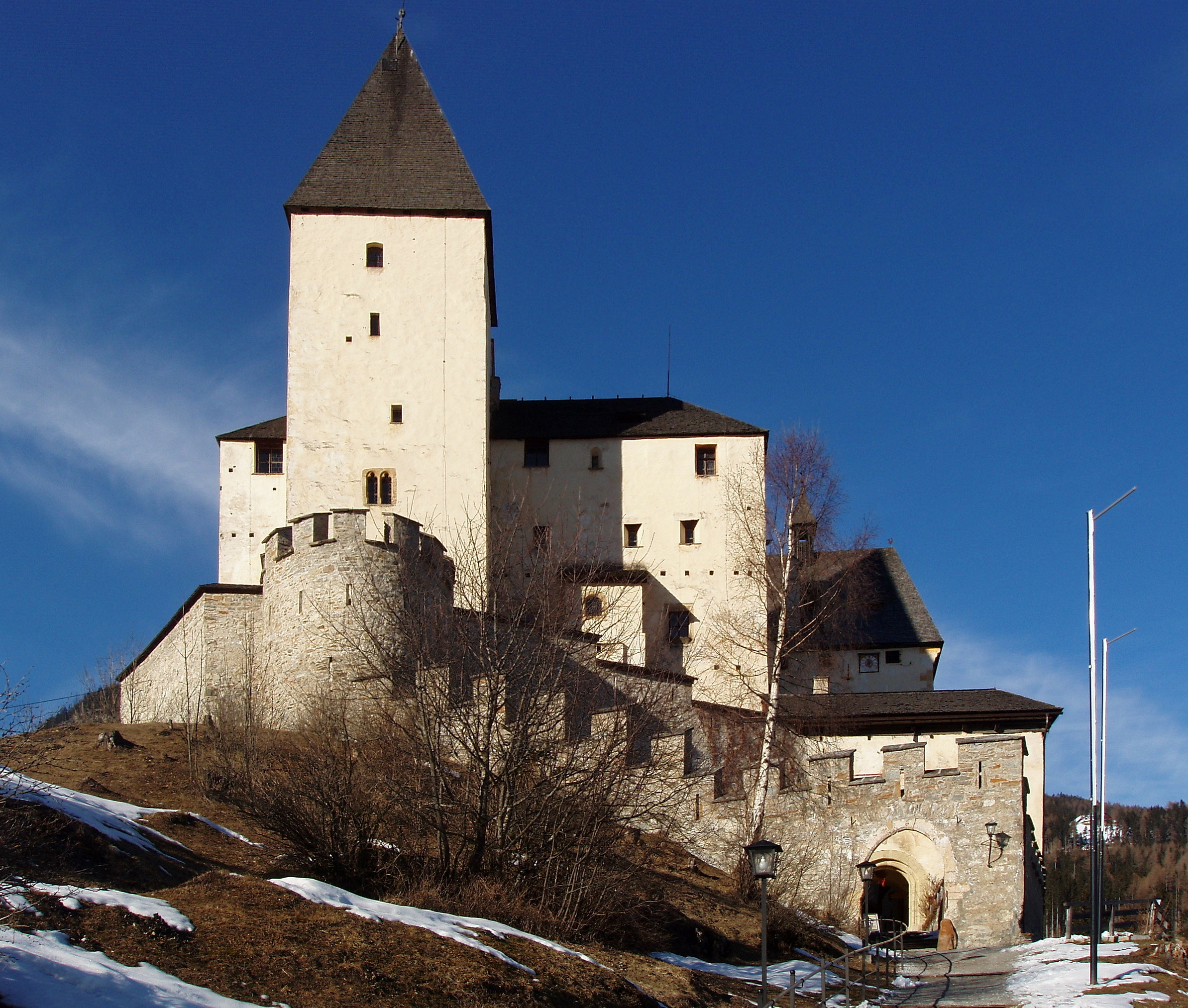
Mauterndorf Castle

The settlement arose from a Roman castra in the Noricum province, at the mountain road from Teurnia to the Radstädter Tauern Pass and Iuvavum (Salzburg). Mauterndorf was first mentioned in a 1002 deed, Mauterndorf Castle was acquired by the Salzburg archbishops in 1023, who set up a toll (Maut) station and ceded the inhabitants market rights in 1217. From the 15th century, the fortress was significantly enlarged as a stronghold at the behest of the archbishops Burkhard Weisbriach and Leonhard von Keutschach.

Mauterndorf received access to the Mur Valley Railway in October 1894, as the western terminus of the narrow gauge line leading to Tamsweg and Murau in Styria. Passenger service from Tamsweg to Mauterndorf ceased in 1973, the section is today used by the museal Taurach Railway.

In 1894 Mauterndorf Castle was purchased by the German staff surgeon Hermann von Epenstein, godfather of Hermann Göring. Göring spent several times in his childhood at the castle and in 1939 inherited it from Epenstein's widow. At the end of World War II he fled to Mauterndorf. Leaving there, he surrendered to the US Army at Bruck an der Großglocknerstraße. Since 1968 the castle has been owned by the State of Salzburg. In 1985 Mauterndorf and was the site of the first-ever FAI World Glider Aerobatic Championships.

== Notable people ==
- Herbert Dreilich (1942-2004), musician

== Politics ==
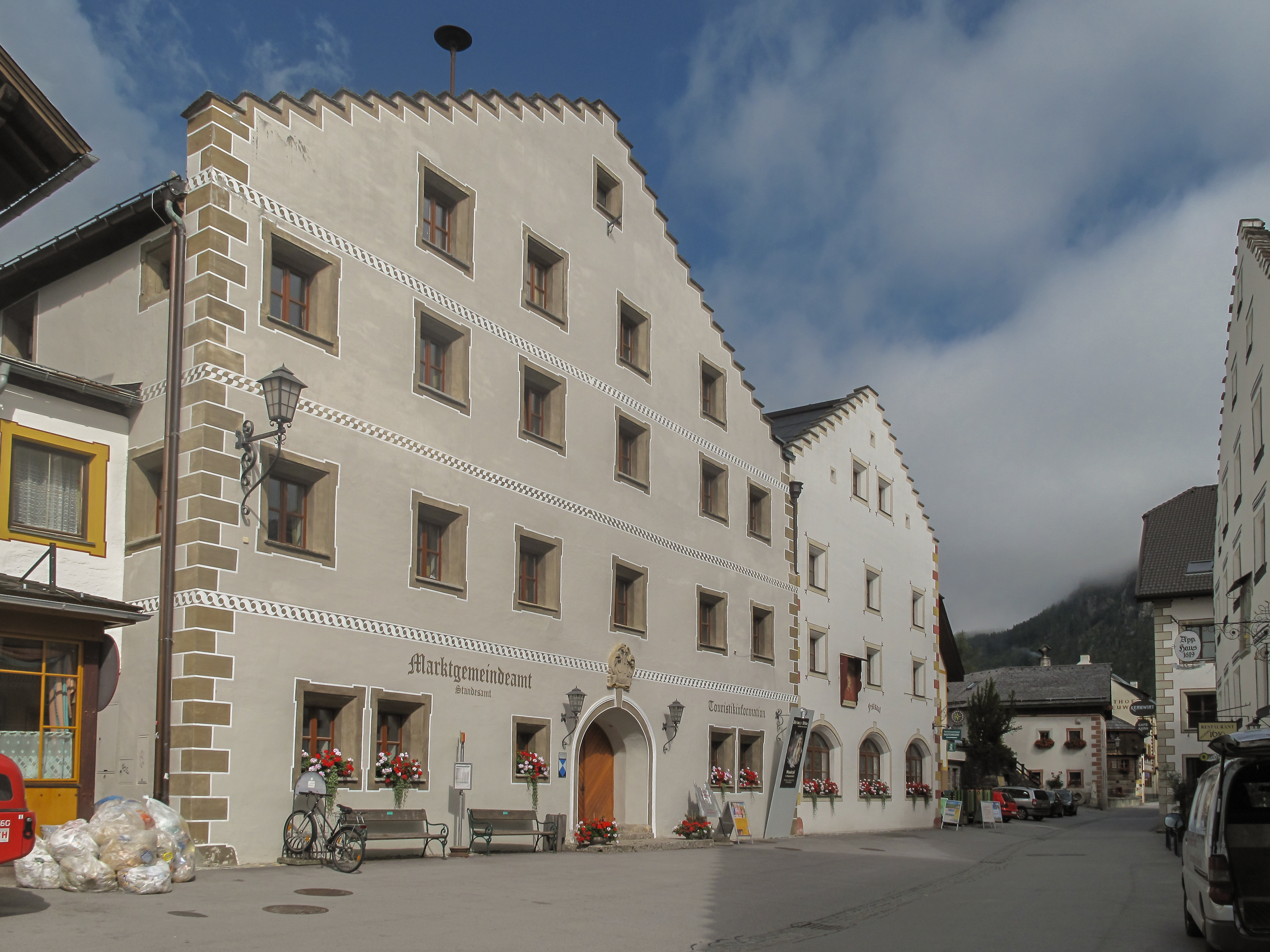
Town hall

Seats in the municipal assembly (Gemeinderat) as of 2009 elections:

- 11 Austrian People's Party (ÖVP)
- 3 Social Democratic Party of Austria (SPÖ)
- 3 Freedom Party of Austria (FPÖ)

== Twin town ==
- Cadolzburg, Germany

== See also ==
- Samson parade
