= Tamsweg =

- Municipality
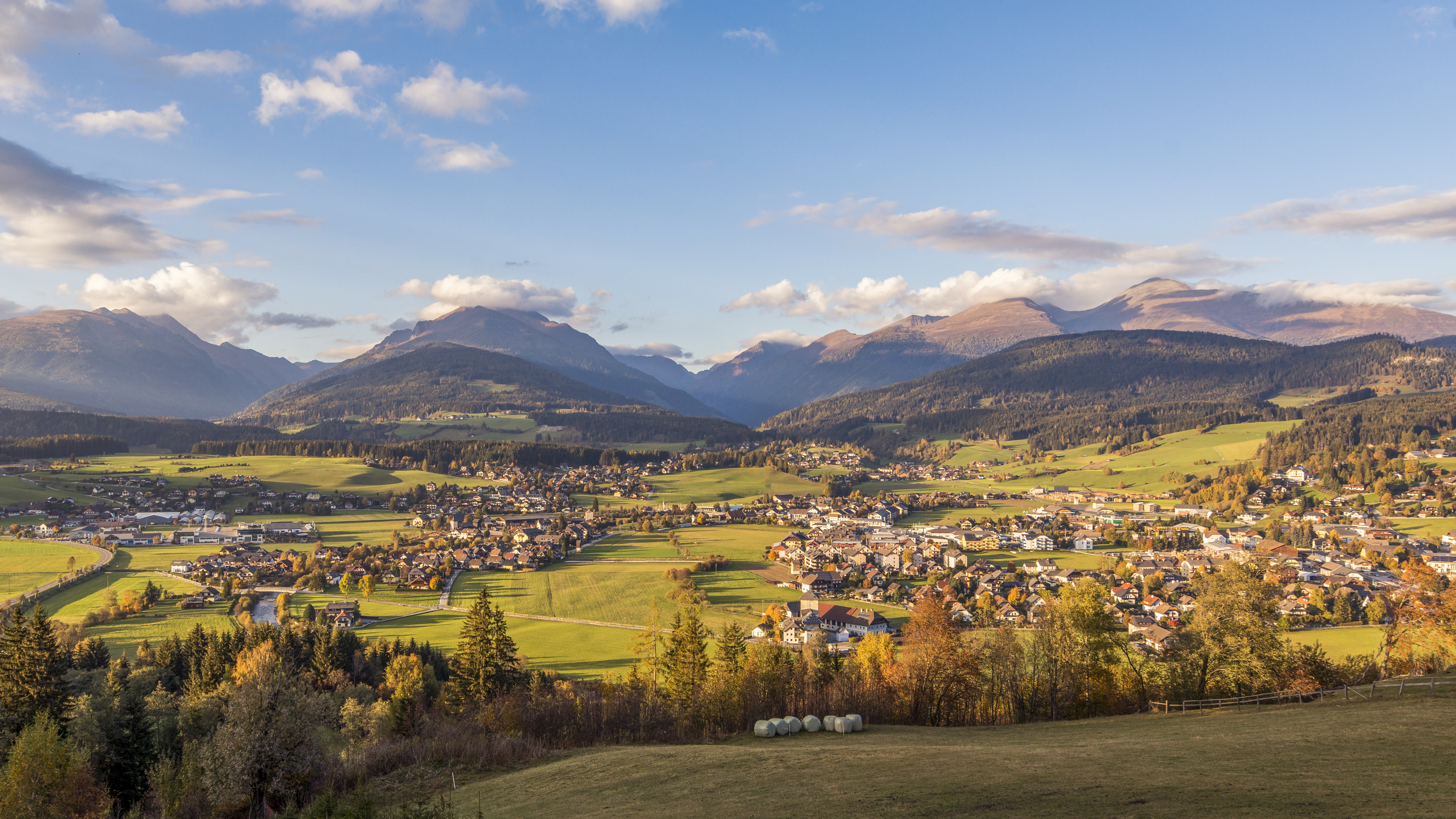
- View from St Leonhard Church

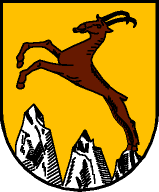
- Coat of arms

- Location within Austria
- Coordinates: 47°07′00″N 13°48′00″E
- Country: Austria
- State: Salzburg
- District: Tamsweg

Government
  - Mayor: Wolfgang Pfeifenberger (ÖVP)

Area
  - Total: 117.36 km^{2} (45.31 sq mi)
- Elevation: 1,022 m (3,353 ft)

Population (2018-01-01)
  - Total: 5,717
  - Density: 48.71/km^{2} (126.2/sq mi)
- Time zone: UTC+1 (CET)
  - Summer (DST): UTC+2 (CEST)
- Postal code: 5580
- Area code: 06474
- Vehicle registration: TA
- Website: www.tamsweg.at

Tamsweg (German pronunciation: [ˈtamsˌveːk]) is a market town in the Austrian state of Salzburg near the border with Styria. It is the administrative centre of the eponymous Tamsweg District (Bezirk) and the largest town of the Salzburg Lungau region.

== Geography ==
Tamsweg is located on the southern slope of the Schladminger Tauern mountain range within the Central Eastern Alps, in the valley of the upper Mur River, the driest basin in Austria. The municipality consists of the cadastral communities of Haiden, Keusching, Lasaberg, Mörtelsdorf, Sauerfeld, Seetal, Tamsweg and Wölting.

=== Climate ===
Climate data for Tamsweg (1991−2020 normals, extremes 1943−present): 1,025 m (3,363 ft)
Month	Jan	Feb	Mar	Apr	May	Jun	Jul	Aug	Sep	Oct	Nov	Dec	Year
Record high °C (°F)	15.7 (60.3)	17.6 (63.7)	21.4 (70.5)	27.2 (81.0)	30.8 (87.4)	34.3 (93.7)	35.2 (95.4)	34.4 (93.9)	29.6 (85.3)	25.7 (78.3)	20.1 (68.2)	16.8 (62.2)	35.2 (95.4)
Mean daily maximum °C (°F)	0.5 (32.9)	4.2 (39.6)	8.3 (46.9)	12.9 (55.2)	16.5 (61.7)	21.6 (70.9)	21.9 (71.4)	21.8 (71.2)	17.9 (64.2)	12.6 (54.7)	6.3 (43.3)	0.6 (33.1)	12.1 (53.8)
Daily mean °C (°F)	−4.3 (24.3)	−1.7 (28.9)	2.7 (36.9)	6.7 (44.1)	11.3 (52.3)	15.2 (59.4)	16.9 (62.4)	16.8 (62.2)	12.4 (54.3)	7.8 (46.0)	2.0 (35.6)	−3.5 (25.7)	6.9 (44.3)
Mean daily minimum °C (°F)	−8.8 (16.2)	−7.8 (18.0)	−3.1 (26.4)	0.4 (32.7)	4.5 (40.1)	8.7 (47.7)	9.6 (49.3)	9.6 (49.3)	6.1 (43.0)	2.1 (35.8)	−2.1 (28.2)	−7.2 (19.0)	1.0 (33.8)
Record low °C (°F)	−32.1 (−25.8)	−31.8 (−25.2)	−26.0 (−14.8)	−13.6 (7.5)	−16.2 (2.8)	−3.5 (25.7)	0.1 (32.2)	−1.4 (29.5)	−6.8 (19.8)	−13.0 (8.6)	−24.5 (−12.1)	−32.5 (−26.5)	−32.5 (−26.5)
Average precipitation mm (inches)	30.0 (1.18)	25.3 (1.00)	31.9 (1.26)	39.1 (1.54)	70.2 (2.76)	96.3 (3.79)	116.3 (4.58)	122.4 (4.82)	71.1 (2.80)	66.7 (2.63)	57.8 (2.28)	34.8 (1.37)	761.9 (30.01)
Average snowfall cm (inches)	31.8 (12.5)	29.7 (11.7)	18.6 (7.3)	8.4 (3.3)	0.1 (0.0)	0.0 (0.0)	0.0 (0.0)	0.0 (0.0)	0.0 (0.0)	3.5 (1.4)	18.7 (7.4)	31.1 (12.2)	141.9 (55.8)
Source: Central Institute for Meteorology and Geodynamics

== History ==
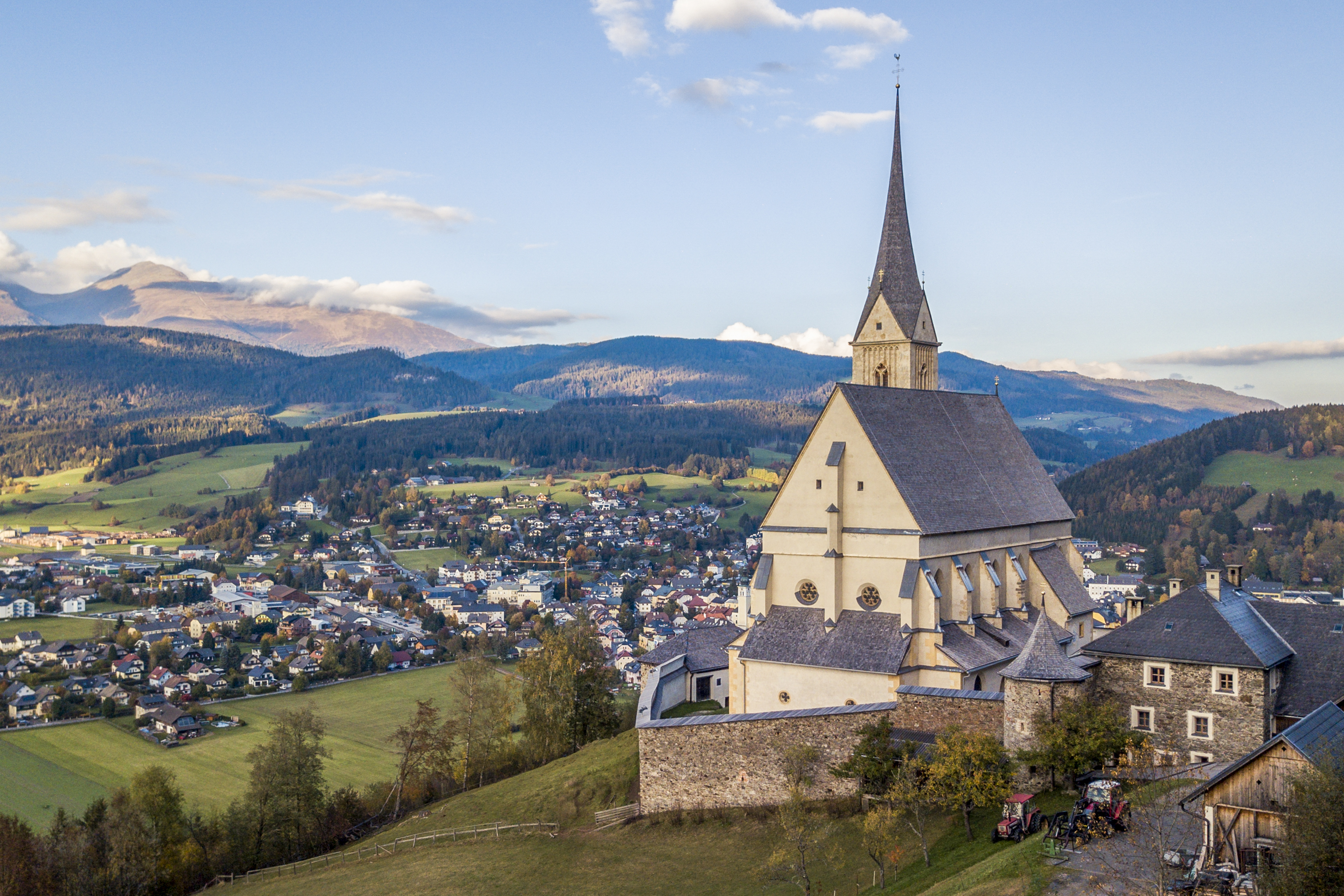
St Leonhard Church

Once part of the Roman Noricum province, the Lungau from the 6th century onwards was a Slavic settlement area, which in the 8th century fell under the influence of the Bavarian dukes. The locality of Taemswich was first mentioned about 1156.

The parish church, originally a filial of nearby Mariapfarr, was acquired by Archbishop Eberhard II of Salzburg in 1246. The Prince-Archbishops had the Saint Leonard pilgrimage church erected about 1433, which in the late 15th century was enlarged as a fortified church in view of repeated Ottoman invasions.

In 1490, it was occupied by Hungarian troops of King Matthias Corvinus and became the site of violent fights against the armed forces of Emperor Frederick III.

The archbishops fought against the Protestant Reformation in their estates, in the course of the Counter-Reformation, Tamsweg was enlarged as an episcopal residence and its citizens vested with further market rights in 1587, especially concerning the trade with salt and iron.

During the Napoleonic War of the First Coalition, Tamsweg was occupied by French troops in 1797, and after the 1803 secularisation of the Salzburg prince-archbishopric, it passed with the Electorate of Salzburg to the Austrian Empire according to the 1805 Peace of Pressburg. The economy of the remote area was decisively promoted, when Tamsweg received access to the Austro-Hungarian railway network with the opening of the Mur Valley Railway line in 1894.

Tamsweg is notable for its annual processions of a Samson figure.

== Politics ==
The municipal assembly (Gemeinderat) consists of 25 seats and as of 2009 elections is composed of

- Austrian People's Party (ÖVP): 12
- Social Democratic Party of Austria (SPÖ): 7
- Freedom Party of Austria (FPÖ): 4
- The Greens: 2

== Twin town ==
Iseo, Brescia, Lombardy, Italy

== Transportation ==
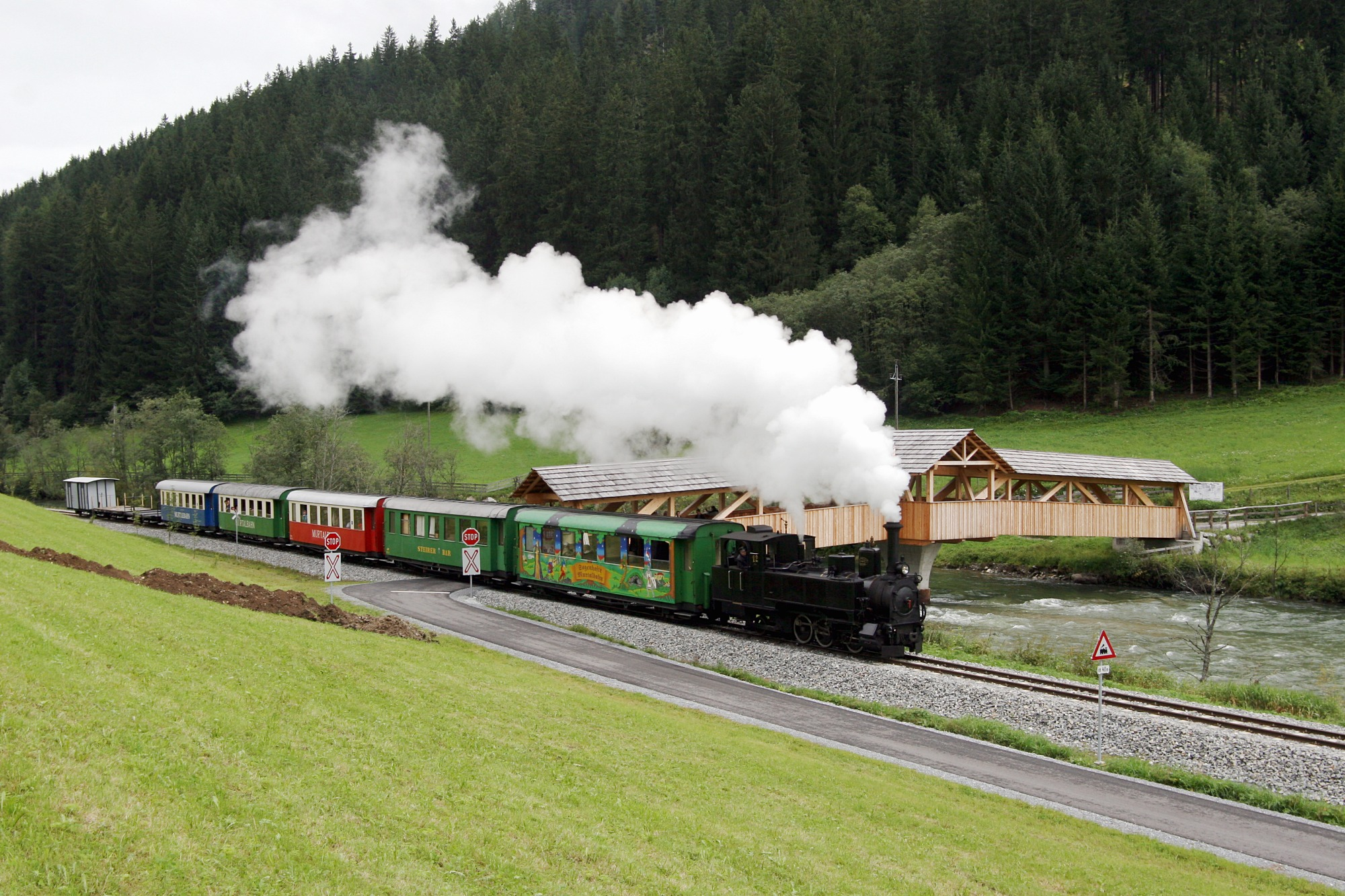
Steam train on the Mur Valley railway

Tamsweg lies at the junction of the Bundesstraßen (federal highways) B95 Turracher Straße from Mauterndorf to Predlitz-Turrach in Styria and the B96 Murtal Straße from Sankt Michael im Lungau and the A 10 Tauern Autobahn (European route E55) to Murau.

It can also be reached by the terminal station of the Murtalbahn narrow gauge railway to the Austrian Southern Railway (Südbahn) at Unzmarkt-Frauenburg.

== Notable people ==
- Franz (Fuxi) Fuchsberger - Six times Powder 8 World Ski Champion
- Eva Moser, chess player
- Ingrid Stöckl (born 1969), alpine skier
