= Thomatal =

- Municipality
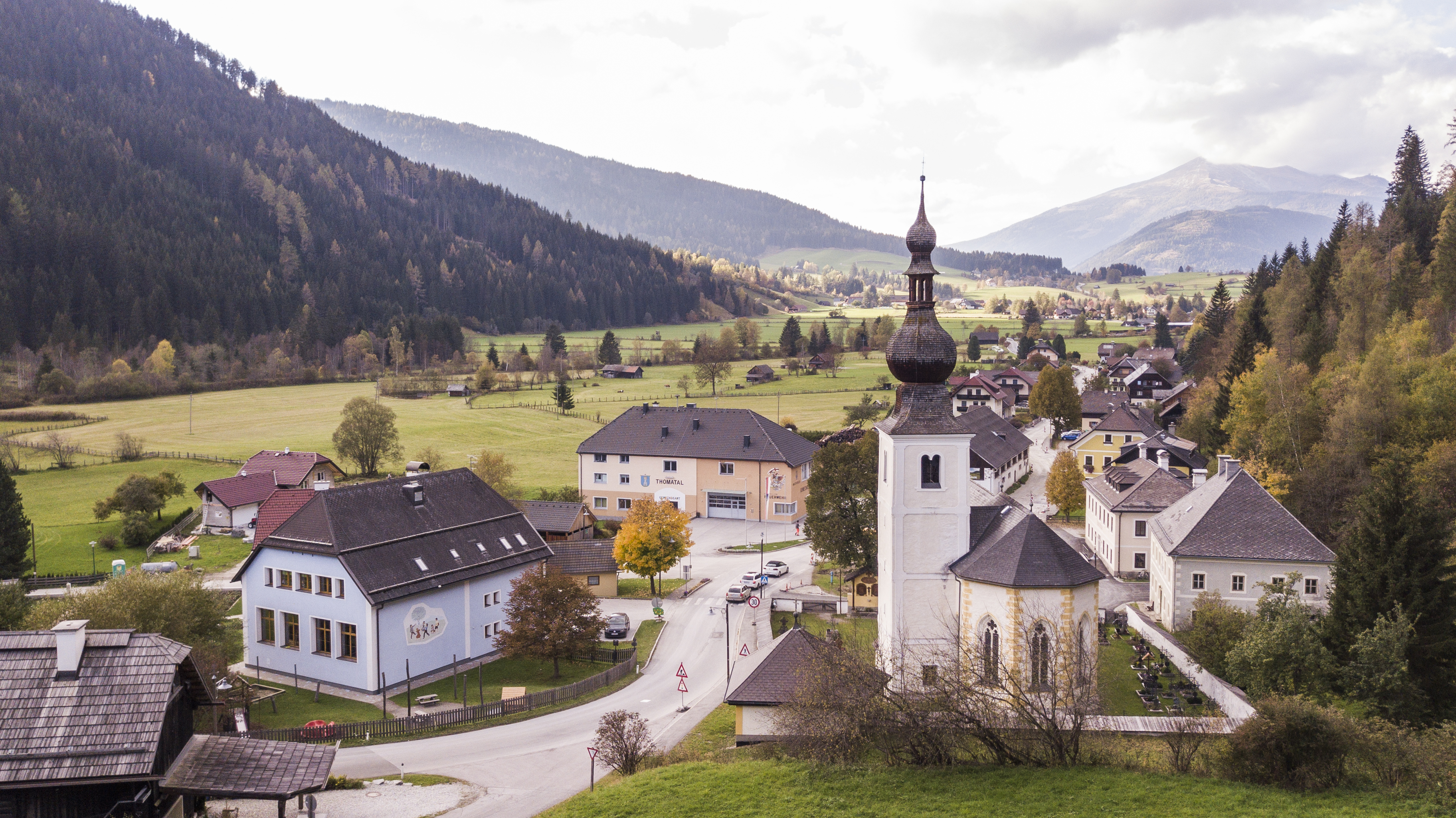
- Thomatal

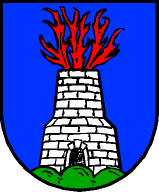
- Coat of arms

- Location within Austria
- Coordinates: 47°04′00″N 13°44′00″E
- Country: Austria
- State: Salzburg
- District: Tamsweg

Government
  - Mayor: Valentin König

Area
  - Total: 75.71 km^{2} (29.23 sq mi)
- Elevation: 1,030 m (3,380 ft)

Population (2018-01-01)
  - Total: 333
  - Density: 4.40/km^{2} (11.4/sq mi)
- Time zone: UTC+1 (CET)
  - Summer (DST): UTC+2 (CEST)
- Postal code: 5592
- Area code: 06476
- Vehicle registration: TA
- Website: www.thomatal.at

Thomatal is a municipality in the district of Tamsweg (which is congruent to the so-called "Lungau" region) in the state of Salzburg in Austria.
