= Weißpriach =

- Municipality
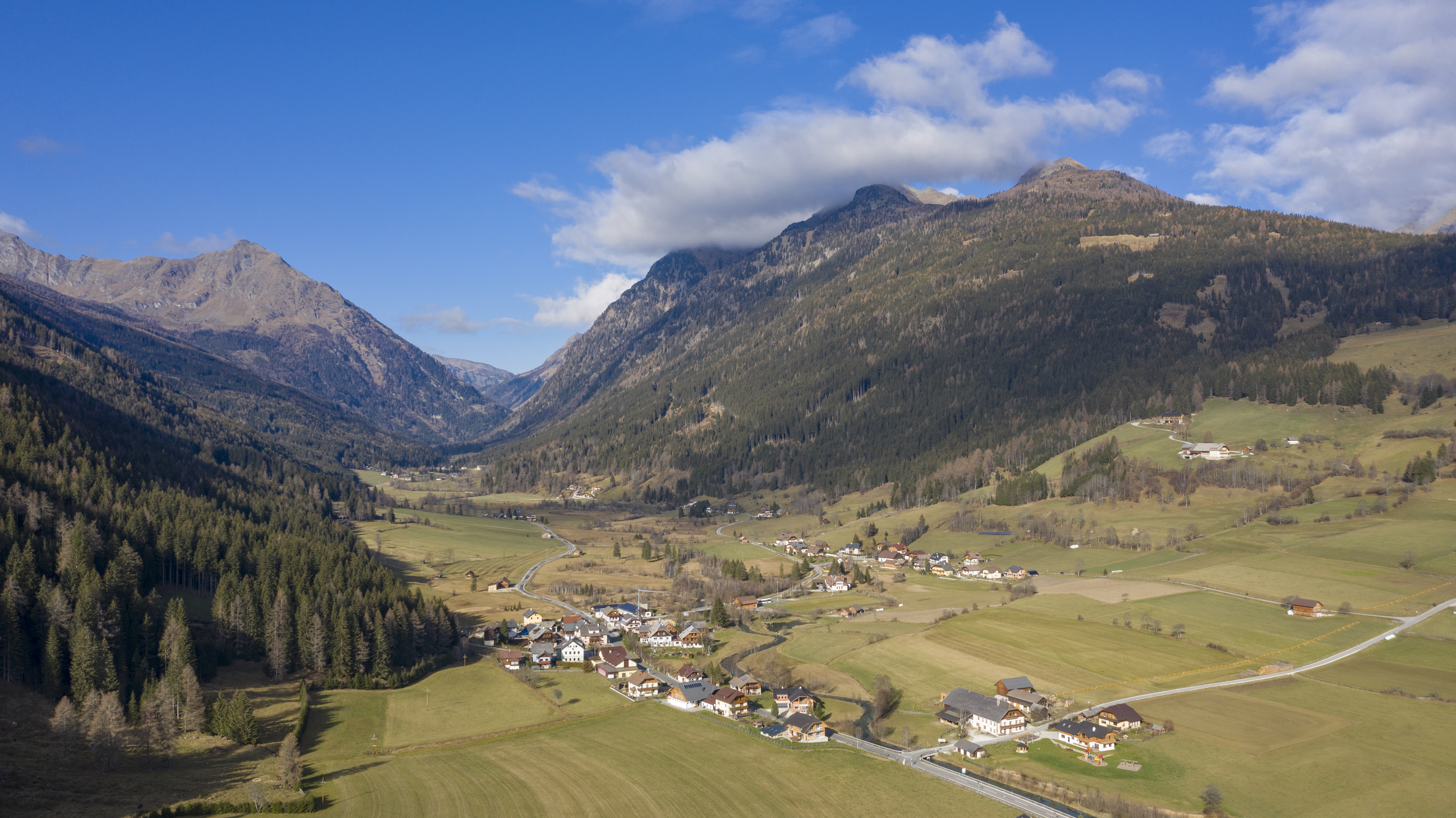
- Weißpriach

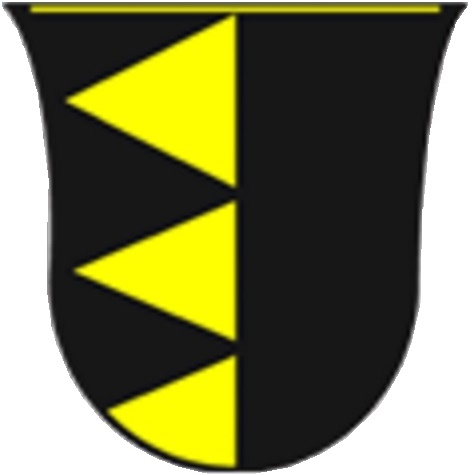
- Coat of arms

- Location within Austria
- Coordinates: 47°10′00″N 13°42′00″E
- Country: Austria
- State: Salzburg
- District: Tamsweg

Government
  - Mayor: Peter Bogensperger (ÖVP)

Area
  - Total: 80.2 km^{2} (31.0 sq mi)
- Elevation: 1,099 m (3,606 ft)

Population (2018-01-01)
  - Total: 306
  - Density: 3.82/km^{2} (9.88/sq mi)
- Time zone: UTC+1 (CET)
  - Summer (DST): UTC+2 (CEST)
- Postal code: 5571
- Area code: 06473
- Vehicle registration: TA
- Website: www.weisspriach.at

Weißpriach is a municipality in the district of Tamsweg in the state of Salzburg in Austria. It is located in a valley of the Niedere Tauern mountain range.

== History ==
Weißpriach is known for the Romanesque church of Saint Rupert with its Byzantine frescoes. The foundations probably date from the Christianization under the rule of Duke Tassilo III of Bavaria in the 8th century and may have replaced a Roman temple.

== Politics ==
Seats in the municipal assembly (Gemeinderat) as of 2009 elections:

- 5 Austrian People's Party (ÖVP)
- 2 Social Democratic Party of Austria (SPÖ)
- 2 Freedom Party of Austria (FPÖ)
