= Tamsweg District =

Coordinates: 47°07′N 13°49′E

Tamsweg District Bezirk Tamsweg
- District
- Country: Austria
- State: Salzburg
- Number of municipalities: 15
- Administrative seat: Tamsweg

Government
  - District Governor: Michaela Rohrmoser

Area
  - Total: 1,019.65 km^{2} (393.69 sq mi)

Population (2023)
  - Total: 20,437
  - Density: 20.043/km^{2} (51.912/sq mi)
- Time zone: UTC+01:00 (CET)
  - Summer (DST): UTC+02:00 (CEST)
- ISO 3166 code: AT-505
- Vehicle registration: TA

Historical population
Year	Pop.	±%
1869	13,009	—
1880	12,868	−1.1%
1890	12,417	−3.5%
1900	12,974	+4.5%
1910	14,054	+8.3%
1923	13,785	−1.9%
1934	14,419	+4.6%
1939	14,283	−0.9%
1951	16,558	+15.9%
1961	17,519	+5.8%
1971	19,116	+9.1%
1981	20,106	+5.2%
1991	20,622	+2.6%
2001	21,283	+3.2%
2011	20,502	−3.7%
2023	20,437	−0.3%
Source: Statistik Austria

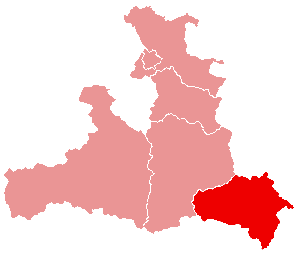
Tamsweg District

Bezirk Tamsweg is an administrative district (Bezirk) in the federal state of Salzburg, Austria. It is congruent with the Lungau region (German pronunciation: [ˈlʊŋˌɡaʊ̯]). The administrative centre of the district is Tamsweg.

== Geography ==
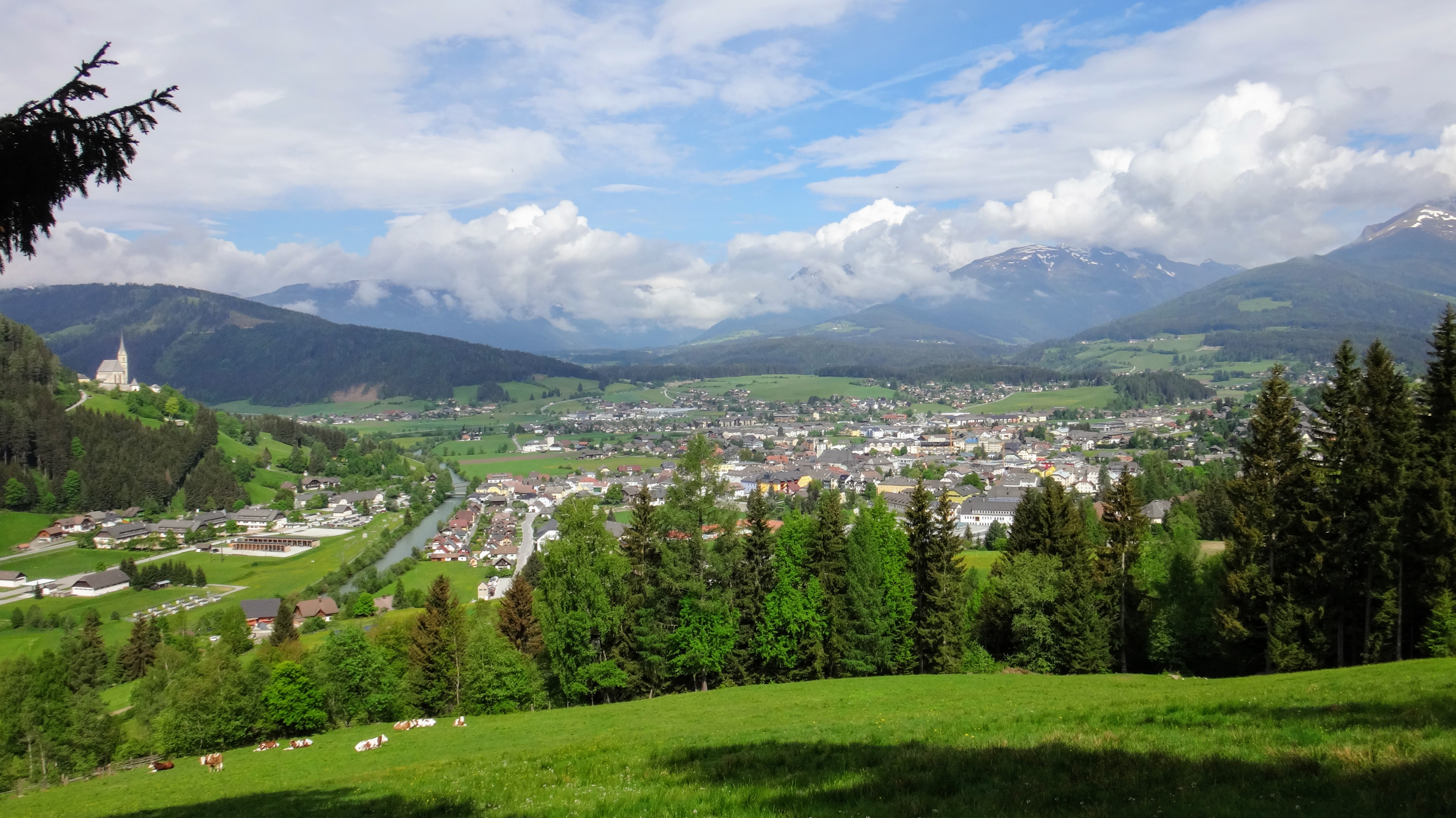

The area of the Lungau plateau is 1,019.65 km^{2}, with a population of 20,437 (January 1, 2023), and population density 20 persons per km^{2}. It is located within the Central Eastern Alps, confined by the Hohe Tauern (High Tauern) range in the west, the Niedere Tauern (Low Tauern) in the north, and the Gurktal Alps (Nock Mountains) in the south.

The region is separated from the Salzburg Pongau region by the Radstädter Tauern Pass crossing the Niedere Tauern. In the south, the Katschberg Pass road leads to the neighbouring state of Carinthia. Since 1974, the Tauern Autobahn underpasses both ranges via the Tauern Road Tunnel and the Katschberg Tunnel. In the east, the upper river Mur, originating near Muhr, flows towards Murau in Styria, accompanied by the narrow-gauge Taurach Railway and the Mur Valley Railway.

Beside some pastoral economy, Lungau largely depends on tourism.

== Administrative divisions ==
The district is divided into 15 municipalities, four of them are market towns.

=== Market towns ===
1. Mariapfarr (2,475)
2. Mauterndorf (1,609)
3. St. Michael im Lungau (3,539)
4. Tamsweg (5,757)

=== Municipalities ===
1. Göriach (345)
2. Lessach (547)
3. Muhr (489)
4. Ramingstein (1,040)
5. St. Andrä im Lungau (748)
6. St. Margarethen im Lungau (761)
7. Thomatal (356)
8. Tweng (239)
9. Unternberg (1,043)
10. Weißpriach (307)
11. Zederhaus (1,182)

(population numbers Jan. 1, 2023)

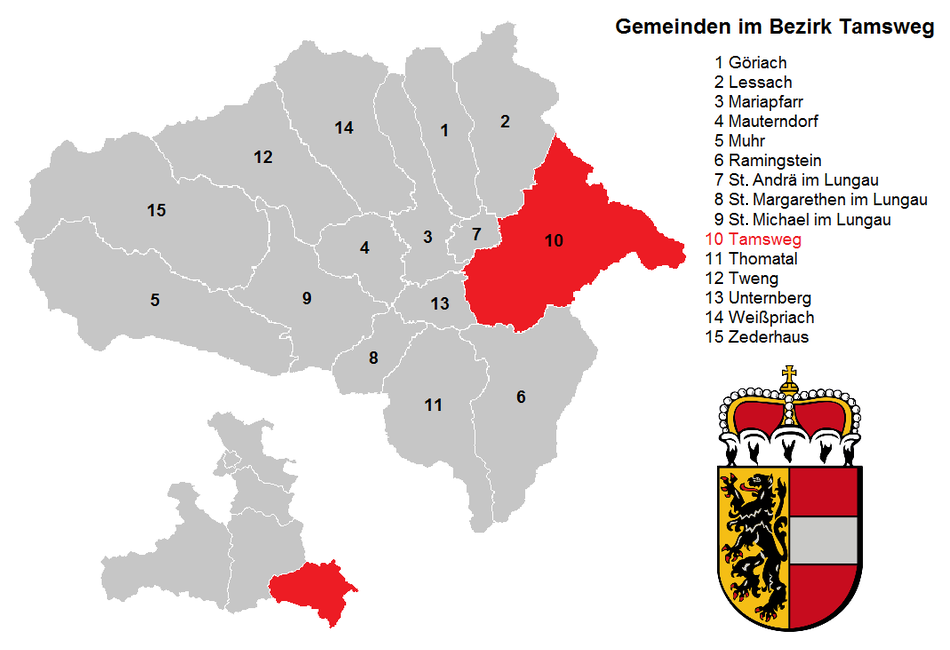
Bezirk Tamsweg
