= Fuxi Fuchsberger =

Austrian skier

Medal record

Men's Powder 8 World Ski Championships

World Championships
Gold medal – first place	World Powder 8 Champion with partner Hayden Scott 1997	Blue River, BC, Canada
Gold medal – first place	World Powder 8 Champion with partner Eric Archer 2000	
Gold medal – first place	World Powder 8 Champion with partner Eric Archer 2001	
Gold medal – first place	World Powder 8 Masters and Overall Champion with partner Pepi Neubauer 2002	
Gold medal – first place	World Powder 8 Masters Champion 2003	
Gold medal – first place	World Powder 8 Masters Champion 2004	
Silver medal – second place	World Powder 8 Masters Champion 2005	

Franz (Fuxi) Fuchsberger (born Tamsweg, Austria) is an Austrian skier. He started skiing at the age of six.

After successfully completing his ski instructors' exam for full certification at the Sports Government Institute in St. Christoph, Austria, Fuchsberger moved to the United States and worked as a ski instructor at Boyne Mountain, Michigan during the 1983–84 season. He later moved to Big Sky, Montana, where he was introduced to the sport of Powder 8 skiing by Hans Schernthaner, a fellow ski instructor.

In 1987, he relocated to Vail, Colorado, where he taught skiing during the Colorado winter season while teaching in Australia and South America during the U.S. summer season.

== Honors ==
- Three-time World Synchronized Demo Ski Team Champion / Team Vail
- Ten-time Vail/Beaver Creek Ski School Overall Champion in SG/GS/SL
- Twenty-five-time Powder 8 Champion with seventeen top three finishes in Powder 8 competitions
- 1991 - US Ski Instructor Champion GS, both as an individual and also with Team Vail
- 1996 - Overall Vail Town Champion in SG/GS/SL (Super-G/Giant Slalom/Slalom)
- 1997 - Number One Ranked Nastar Racer in the US (www.nastar.com)
- 1997 - World Powder 8 Champion with Hayden Scott.
- 1998 - World Alpine Synchronized Skiing Champion / Team Vail-Snowell
- 1998 - Ski Instructor of the Year
- 1998 - WORLD Powder 8 Champion with Hayden Scott.
- 1999 - Overall Vail Town Champion in SG/GS/SL
- 1999 - Beaver Creek Town Race Series Champion (Team SnowellUSA.com)
- 1999 - Vail Town Race Series Champion (Team SnowellUSA.com)
- 2000 - Synchro Ski World Championship Victory Samnaun/Switzerland
- 2000 - Beaver Creek Town Race Series Champion (Team SnowellUSA.com)
- 2000 - Vail Town Race Series Champion (Team SnowellUSA.com)
- 2000 - US Powder 8 Series Champion with Eric Archer
- 2001 - Beaver Creek Town Race Series Champion (Team SnowellUSA.com)
- 2001 - Vail Town Race Series Champion (Team SnowellUSA.com)
- 2001 - US Powder 8 Series Champion with Eric Archer
- 2001 - World Powder 8 Champion with partner Eric Archer
- 2002 - Vail Town Race Series Champion (Team SnowellUSA.com)
- 2002 - Beaver Creek Town Race Series Champion (Team SnowellUSA.com)
- 2002 - World Powder 8 Masters and Overall Champion with partner Pepi Neubauer
- 2002 - Runner up to Pepi Neubauer "DUKE CUP" - Vail, CO
- 2003 - Beaver Creek Town Race Series Champion (Team SnowellUSA.com)
- 2003 - Vail Ski School Overall Champion SG/GS/SL
- 2003 - World Powder 8 Masters Champion
- 2003 - Runner up to Pepi Neubauer "DUKE CUP" - Vail, CO
- 2003 - Vail Town Race Series Champion (Team SnowellUSA.com)
- 2004 - Runner up to Pepi Neubauer "DUKE CUP" - Vail, CO
- 2004 - "Heli Schaller Challenge Cup" Champion - Winterpark, CO
- 2004 - Vail Town Race Series Champion (Team SnowellUSA.com)
- 2004 - Beaver Creek Town Race Series Champion (Team SnowellUSA.com)
- 2004 - World Powder 8 Masters Champion
- 2005 - Runner up to Pepi Neubauer "DUKE CUP" - Vail, CO
- 2005 - Vail Town Race Series Champion (Team SnowellUSA.com)
- 2005 - Vail Town Race Series Individual Overall Champion
- 2005 - Beaver Creek Town Race Series Champion (Team SnowellUSA.com)
- 2005 - Vail Ski School Overall Champion SG/GS/SL
- 2005 - Rocky Mountain Masters - Elite Class Champion
- 2005 - 2nd Place World Powder 8 Masters Championships
- 2005 - National Masters Downhill Champion - Overall
- 2005 - 1st Place PRO-AM / Team Summit Fundraiser Giant Slalom
