= Mariapfarr =

- Municipality
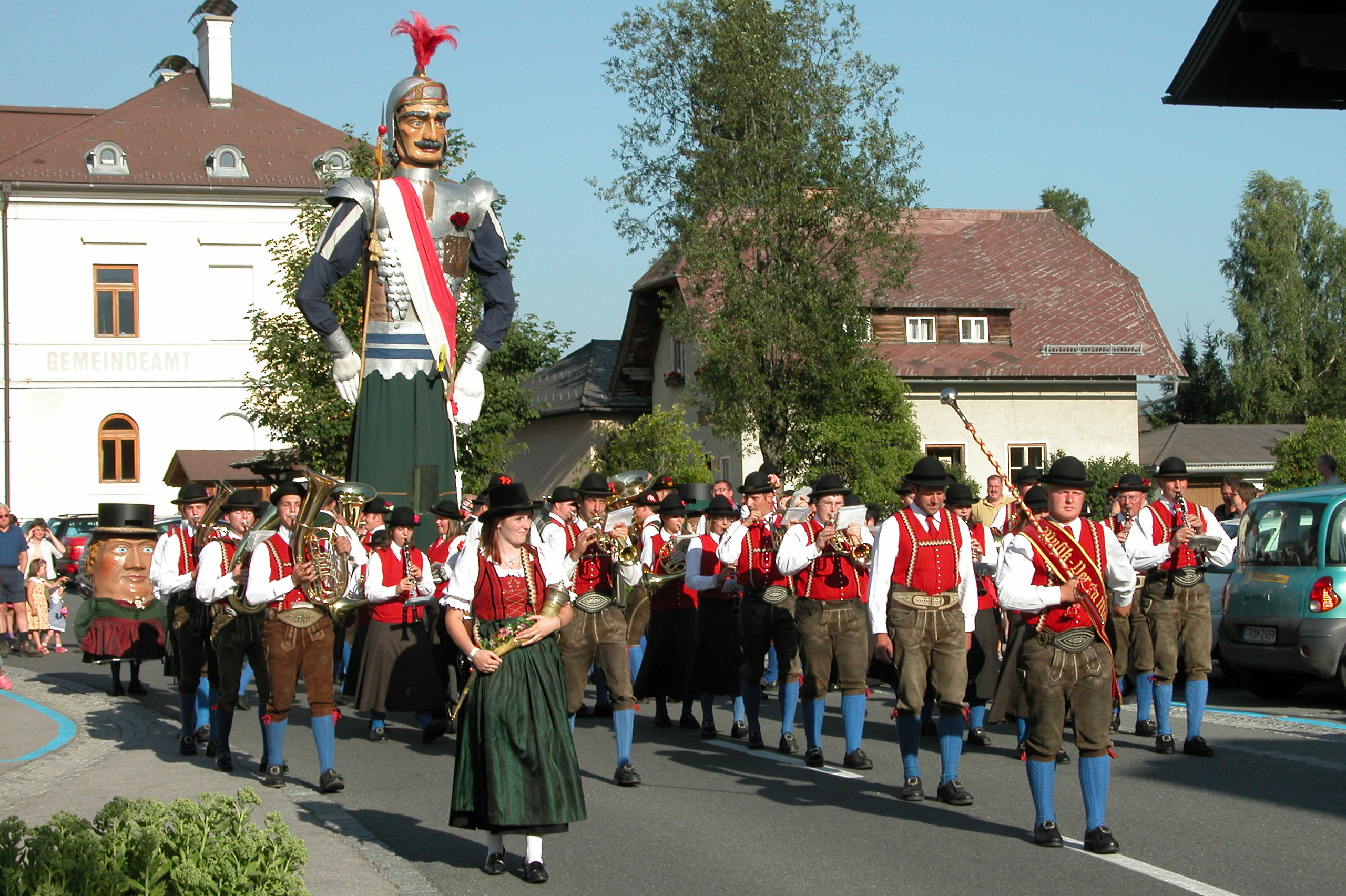
- Samson festivities in Mariapfarr

- Coat of arms

- Location within Austria
- Coordinates: 47°08′58.8″N 13°44′49.9″E
- Country: Austria
- State: Salzburg
- District: Tamsweg

Government
  - Mayor: Andreas Kaiser

Area
  - Total: 1,020 km^{2} (390 sq mi)

Population (October 31, 2021)
  - Total: 2,495
  - Density: 19.77/km^{2} (51.2/sq mi)
- Time zone: UTC+01:00 (CET)
  - Summer (DST): UTC+02:00 (CEST)
- Postal code: 5571
- Area code: 06473
- MCN: 50503
- Registration plate: TA
- Website: Official website

Mariapfarr is a municipality in the district of Tamsweg in the state of Salzburg in Austria. Young priest Joseph Mohr wrote the words to Christmas carol Silent Night in Mariapfarr.
