= Murtalbahn =

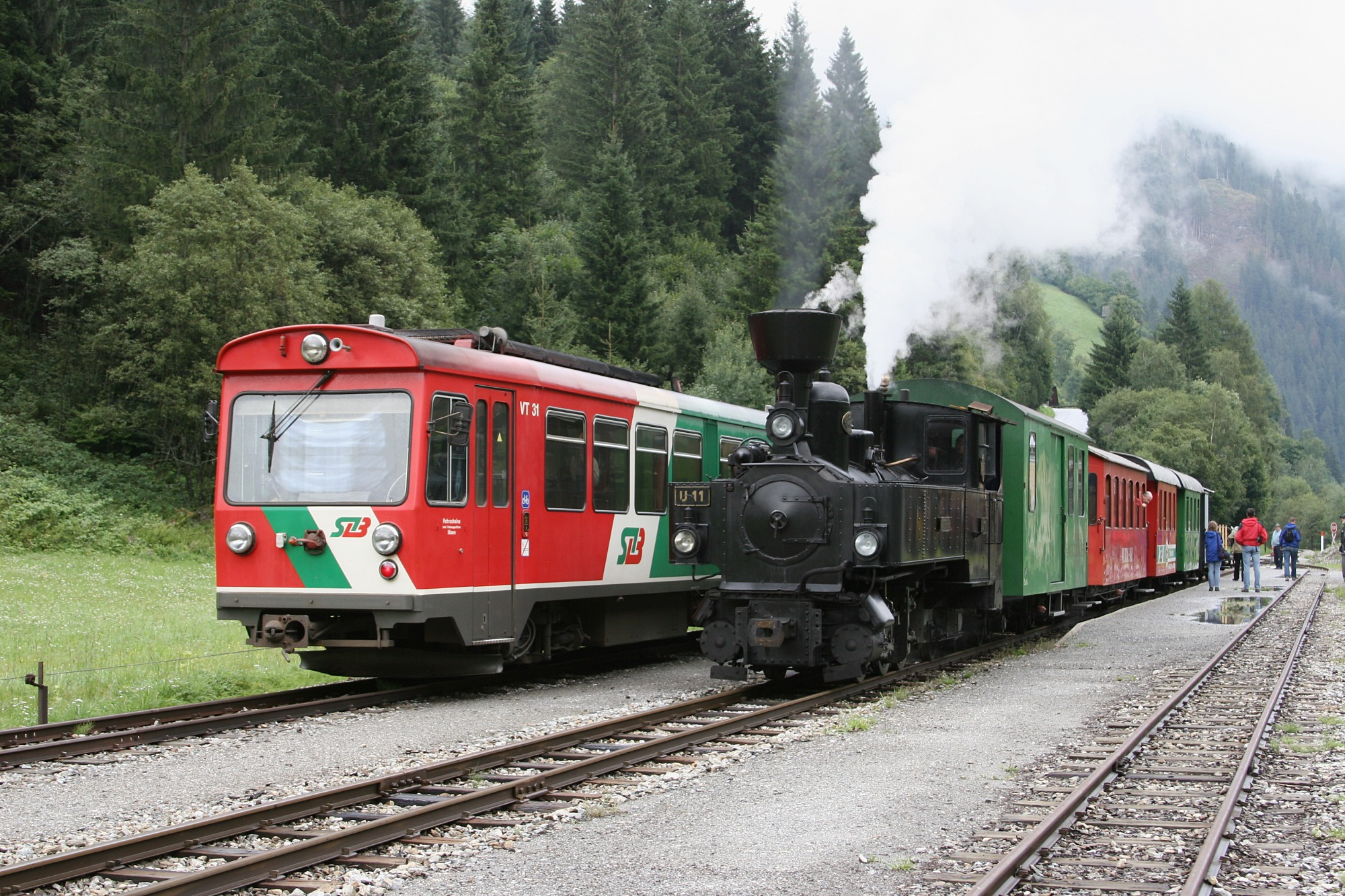
Murtalbahn railcar VT31 and steam engine U11 at Ramingstein-Thomatal station in 2005.

The Murtalbahn (literally translated, the Mur Valley Railway) is a 760 mm (2 ft 5 15/16 in) narrow-gauge railway largely located in the state of Styria in Austria. The line runs along the valley of the River Mur, from the market town of Unzmarkt through Murau to Tamsweg, which is just over the Styrian border in the state of Salzburg. The railway is operated by Steiermärkische Landesbahnen (STLB), which is owned by the state of Styria. With a total length of 76.1 km (47.3 mi), it is the fourth-longest narrow-gauge railway in Austria.

== History ==
The railway line between Unzmarkt and Mauterndorf was opened in October 1894.

In March 1973, the public passenger service on the section between Tamsweg and Mauterndorf was closed. That section is operated today as a museum railway by Club 760, under the name Taurachbahn.

Special steam trains and amateur locomotive trips still operate over the route.

== Accidents and incidents ==
On 9 July 2021, railcar VT 32 was derailed due to a fallen tree, with one carriage ending up on its side in the Mur. Seventeen people, mostly young school-age children, were injured.

== Operation ==
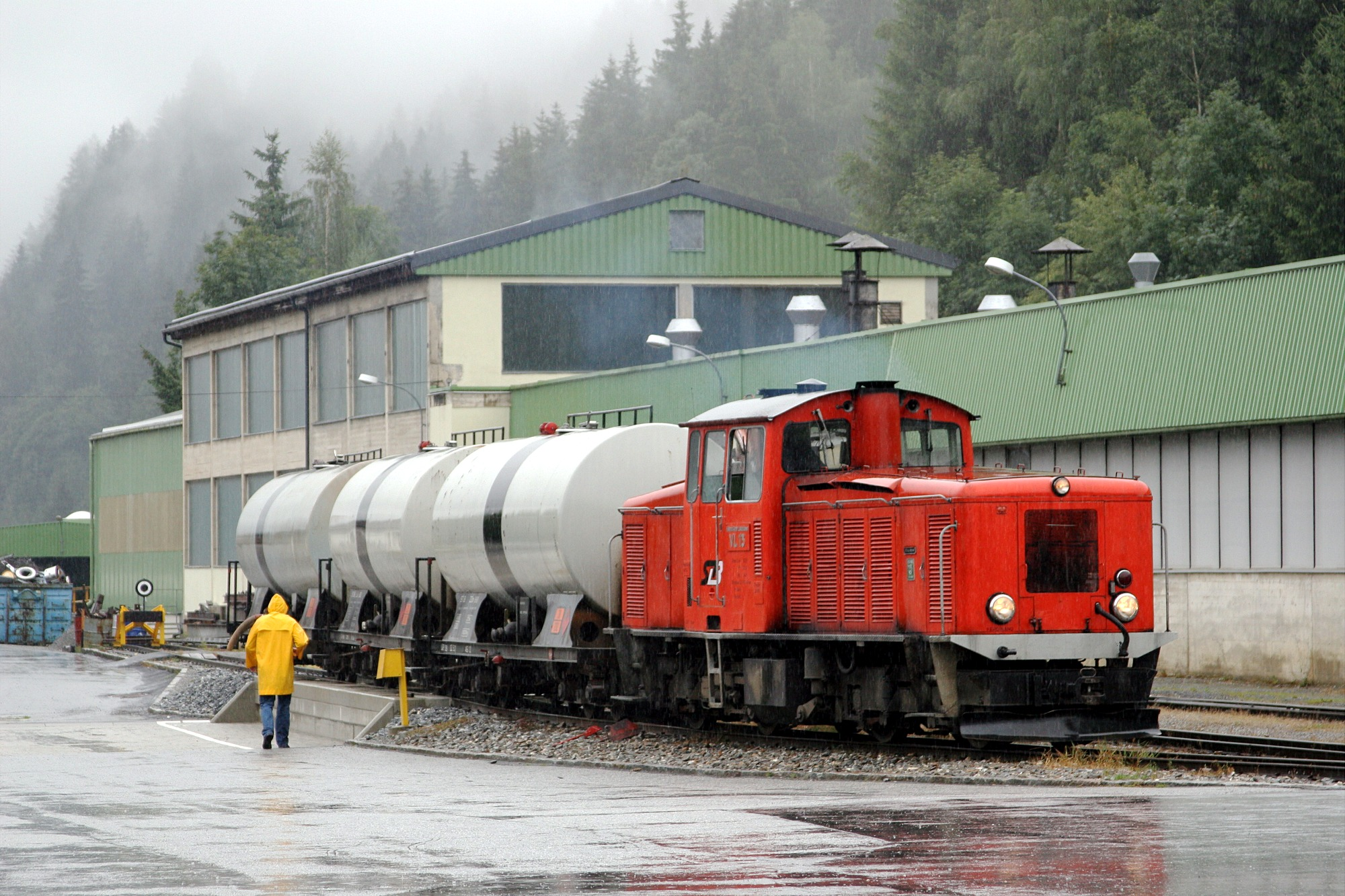
Diesel locomotive VL13 at Murau in 2006.

Five diesel-electric railcars, introduced in 1981, are used to operate a service over the line every two hours. In the summer months, the STLB operates weekend steam-hauled services between Murau, where the main workshop are, and Tamsweg. Goods trains still operate on the railway, hauled by diesel locomotives VL 14 and 15, built in 1966. Timber and petroleum are the major goods transported.

The STLB has invested in the railway, and the infrastructure is maintained to the standard of mainline standard gauge routes. There are good positions for photography by railway enthusiasts along the whole route, particularly in the valley between Madling and Tamsweg.

== Museum ==
Club 760 maintains a museum in the locomotive shed at Frojach Katschtal station.

== Fleet ==
Number	Built	Builder	Wheel arrangement
Steam locomotives
Stainz 2	1892	Krauss	0-4-0T
U 11	1894	Krauss	0-6-2T
Bh1	1905	Krauss	0-6-2T
U 40	1908	Wiener Neustädter Lokomotivfabrik	0-6-2T
U 43	1913	Krauss	0-6-2T
Diesel Locomotives
VL 5	1938	Demag	B
VL 6	1959	Orenstein & Koppel	B
VL 7	1940	Gmeinder	B
VL 12	1966	ÖMAG	B-B
VL 13	1967	ÖMAG	B-B
VL 16	1967	ÖMAG	B-B
Diesel Railcars and Trailers
VT 31	1980	Knotz	
VT 32	1981	Knotz	
VT 33	1981	Knotz	
VT 34	1981	Knotz	
VT 35	1998	Jenbacher Werke	
VS 41	1982	Knotz	
VS 42	1982	Knotz	
VS 43	1982	Knotz/BBC	
VS 44	1982	Knotz/BBC	
