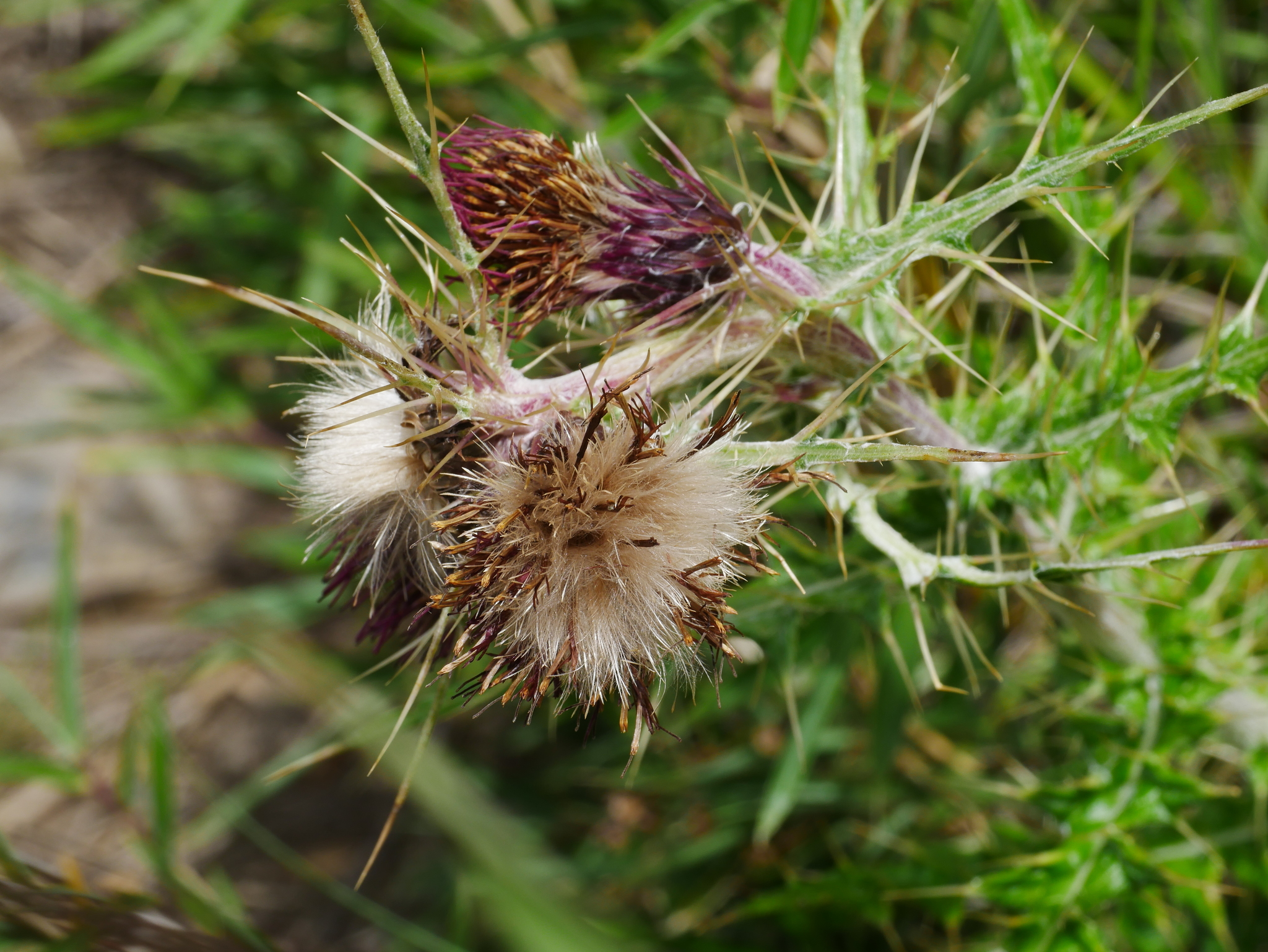

Scientific classification
- Kingdom: Plantae
- Clade: Tracheophytes
- Clade: Angiosperms
- Clade: Eudicots
- Clade: Asterids
- Order: Asterales
- Family: Asteraceae
- Genus: Cirsium
- Species: C. hosokawai

Binomial name
- Cirsium hosokawai Kitamura, 1941

= Cirsium hosokawai =

Species of plant

Cirsium hosokawai is a flowering plant of the family Asteraceae endemic to Taiwan and found in alpine meadows above 3,500 meters in elevation.

== 参考文献 ==
- 昆明植物研究所. "细川蓟". 《中国高等植物数据库全库》. 中国科学院微生物研究所. Archived from the original on 2016-03-05.
