= White thistle =

White thistle is a common name for several plants and may refer to:

- Atriplex lentiformis, native to the southwestern United States and northern Mexico
- Cirsium hookerianum, native to the northwestern United States and western Canada
