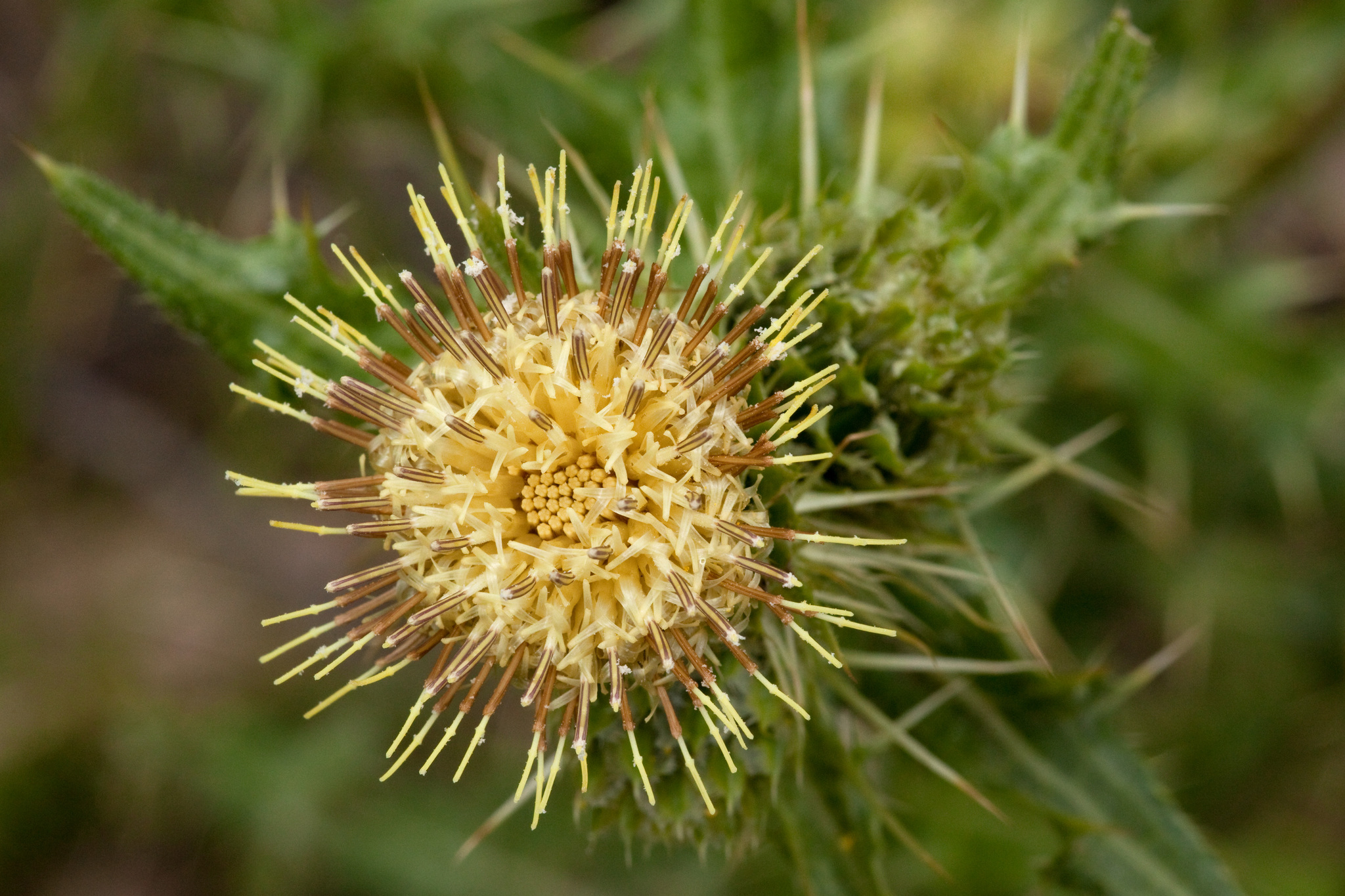

Conservation status
- Apparently Secure (NatureServe)

Scientific classification
- Kingdom: Plantae
- Clade: Tracheophytes
- Clade: Angiosperms
- Clade: Eudicots
- Clade: Asterids
- Order: Asterales
- Family: Asteraceae
- Genus: Cirsium
- Species: C. parryi

Binomial name
- Cirsium parryi (A.Gray) Petr.

Synonyms
- Synonymy: Carduus gilensis Wooton & Standl.; Carduus inornatus Wooton & Standl.; Carduus pallidus Wooton & Standl.; Carduus parryi (A.Gray) Greene; Cirsium gilense (Wooton & Standl.) Wooton & Standl.; Cirsium inornatum (Wooton & Standl.) Wooton & Standl.; Cirsium pallidum (Wooton & Standl.) Wooton & Standl.; Cirsium parryi (A.Gray) Cockerell ex Daniels; Cirsium parryi subsp. mogollonicum Schaack & G.A. Goodwin; Cnicus parryi A.Gray

= Cirsium parryi =

Species of thistle

Cirsium parryi, or Parry's thistle, is a species of North American flowering plants in the family Asteraceae. It is native to the southwestern United States, where it has been found in Colorado, Arizona, and New Mexico.

Cirsium parryi is a biennial herb with a hairy stem growing up to 200 cm (80 inches) tall or more. The leaves are oblong or lance-shaped and measure 10 to 30 centimeters (4–12 inches) long. They are often toothed or divided partly into lobes. The lower ones have usually withered by flowering time. The inflorescence may contain many flower heads at the end of the stem and near the upper leaves. Each is up to 2.5 centimeters (1 inch) wide with spiny bracts at the base. The spiny phyllaries along the sides of the flower head are green with brownish tips. In the head are many flowers which are generally yellowish, or sometimes purplish or white. There are no ray florets. The fruit is an achene which may be over 2 centimeters (0.8 inches) long including its pappus.

This plant grows in moist areas in coniferous forests and meadows and near streams.

This species may form hybrids with C. grahamii in Arizona and C. canescens in Colorado.
