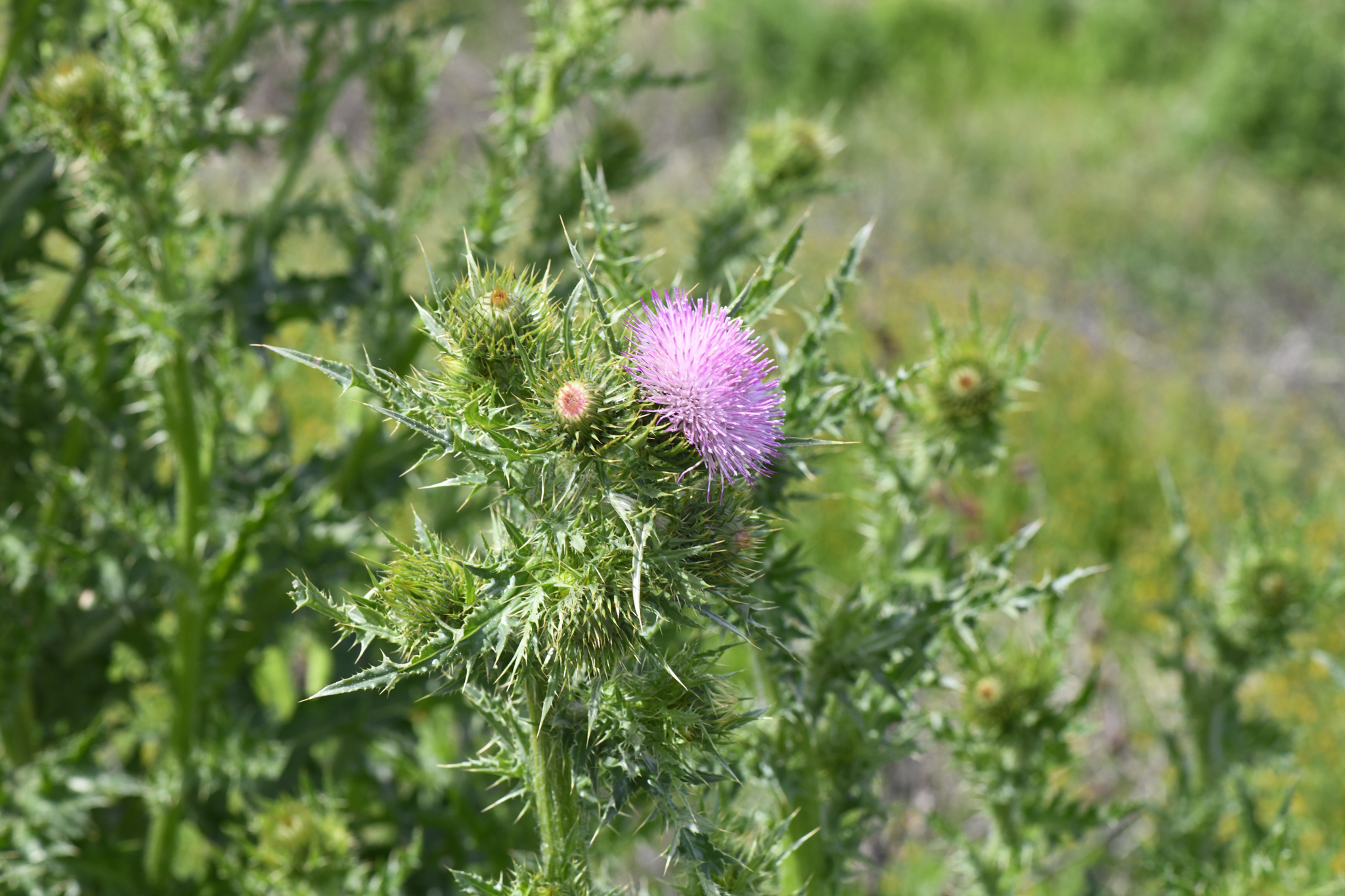

Conservation status
- Critically Imperiled (NatureServe)

Scientific classification
- Kingdom: Plantae
- Clade: Tracheophytes
- Clade: Angiosperms
- Clade: Eudicots
- Clade: Asterids
- Order: Asterales
- Family: Asteraceae
- Genus: Cirsium
- Species: C. crassicaule

Binomial name
- Cirsium crassicaule (Greene) Jeps.

Synonyms
- Carduus crassicaulis Greene

= Cirsium crassicaule =

Species of thistle

Cirsium crassicaule is a species of thistle known by the common name slough thistle. It is endemic to the San Joaquin Valley of California, where it is known primarily from freshwater wetlands. It has been found in only a few locations in Kern, Kings, and San Joaquin Counties.

Cirsium crassicaule is an annual or biennial herb known to reach 300 cm (10 feet) in height. The thick stem is hollow and may be nearly 10 centimeters (4 inches) wide at the base. It is coated in hairs and cobwebby fibers. The woolly, webby, spiny leaves are deeply cut into many lobes, the lobes often lined with teeth. The longest leaves near the base of the plant may be 70 centimeters (28 inches) long.

The inflorescence is a cluster of several flower heads each up to 3 centimeters long by 3 wide. The head is lined with spiny phyllaries and filled with pale pink or occasionally white flowers. The fruit is an achene with a flat, dark brown body about 5 millimeters long and topped with a pappus which may be 2 centimeters in length.
