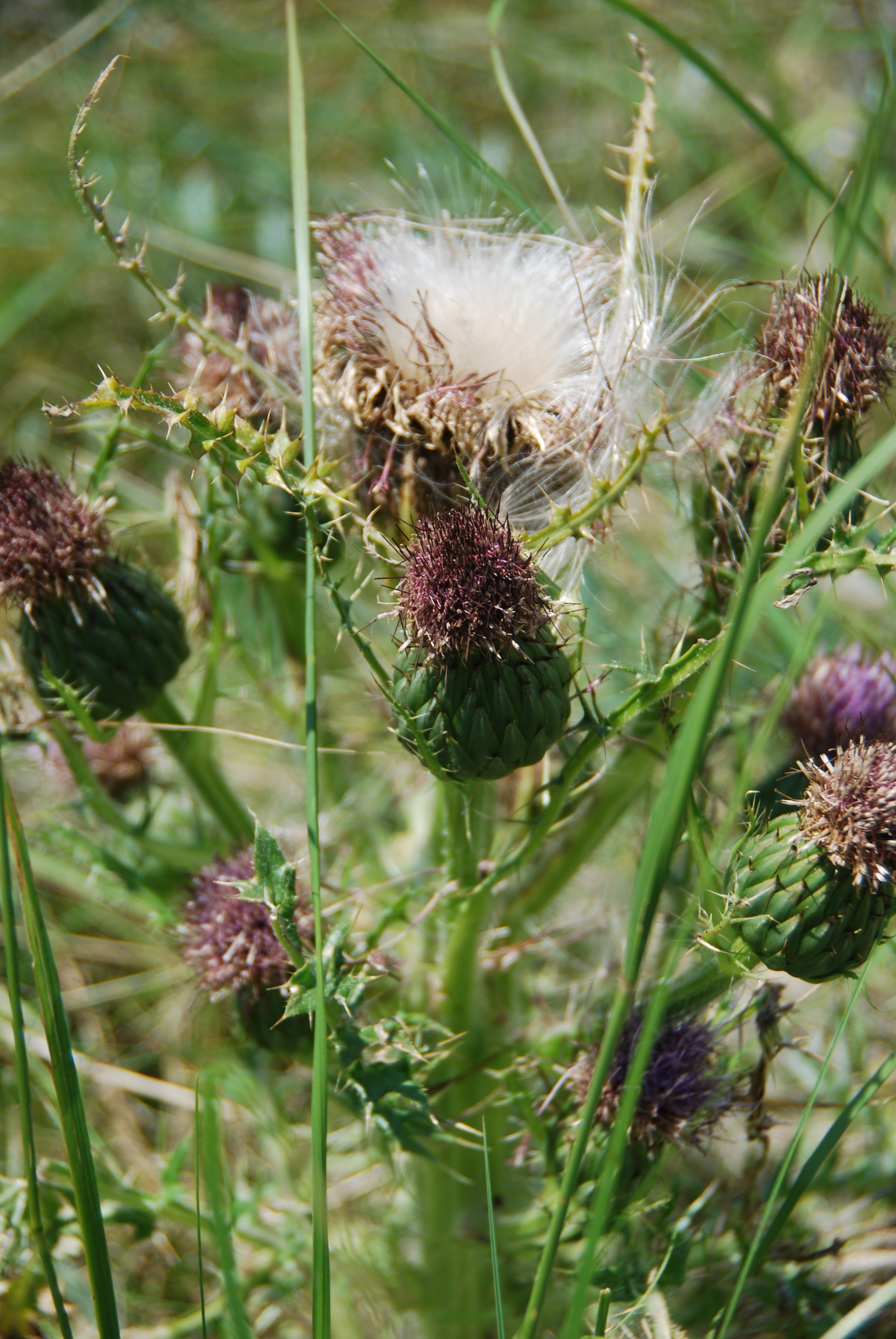

Conservation status
- Secure (NatureServe)

Scientific classification
- Kingdom: Plantae
- Clade: Tracheophytes
- Clade: Angiosperms
- Clade: Eudicots
- Clade: Asterids
- Order: Asterales
- Family: Asteraceae
- Genus: Cirsium
- Species: C. drummondii

Binomial name
- Cirsium drummondii Torr. & A.Gray

Synonyms
- Carduus drummondii (Torr. & A.Gray) Coville; Cirsium coccinatum Osterh.; Cnicus drummondii (Torr. & A.Gray) A.Gray

= Cirsium drummondii =

Species of thistle

Cirsium drummondii, called Drummond's thistle, dwarf thistle or short-stemmed thistle, is a North American species of plant in the tribe Cardueae within the family Asteraceae. The species is native to central and western Canada, in every province from Ontario to British Columbia, plus the Northwest Territories. In the United States, it has been found only in the Black Hills of Wyoming and South Dakota.

Cirsium drummondii is a biennial or perennial herb up to 110 cm (44 inches) tall, blooming only once before dying. Leaves have thin spines along the edges. There is sometimes only one flowering head per plant, but sometimes several, with purple (rarely white) disc florets but no ray florets.
