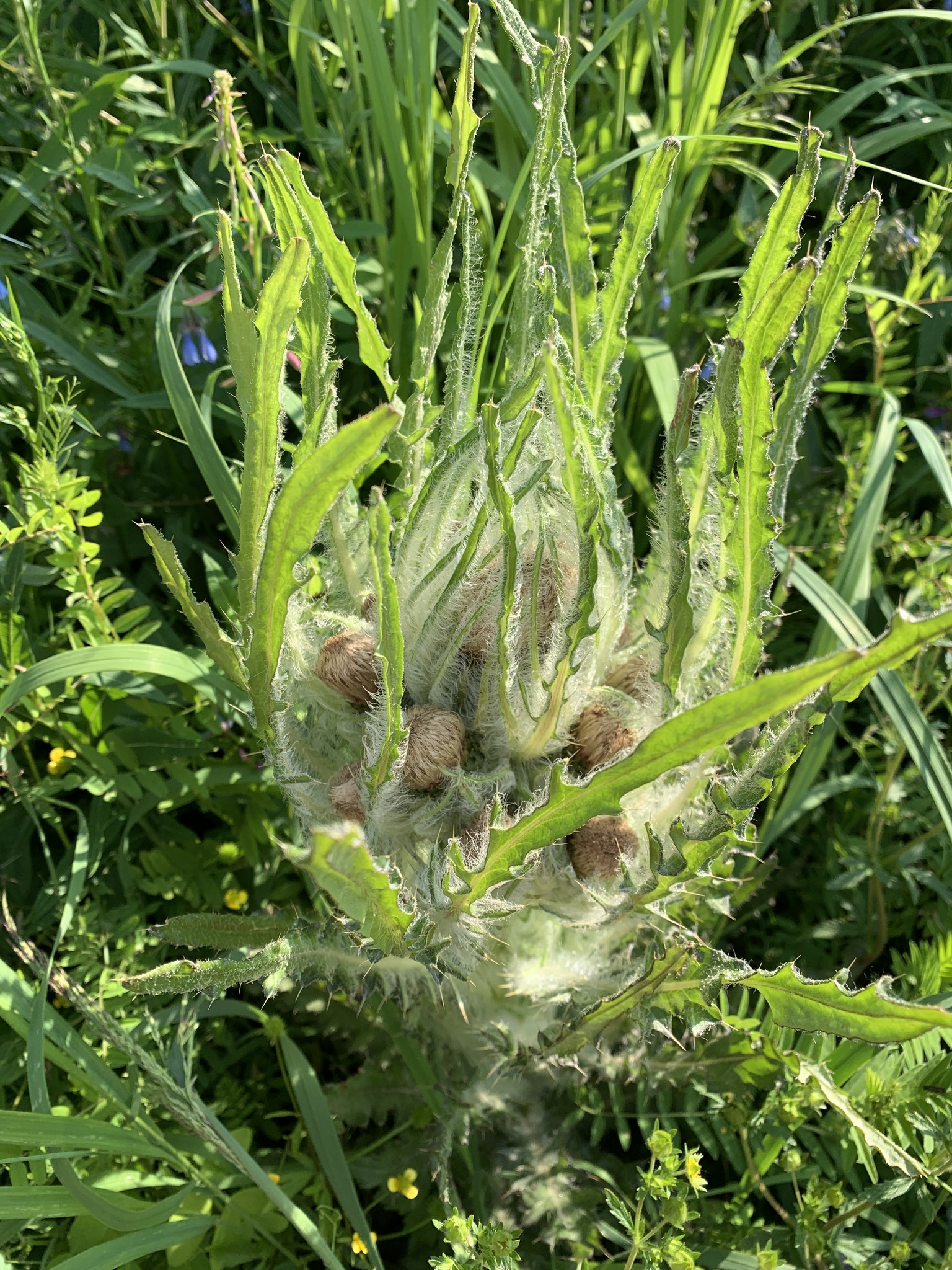

Scientific classification
- Kingdom: Plantae
- Clade: Embryophytes
- Clade: Tracheophytes
- Clade: Spermatophytes
- Clade: Angiosperms
- Clade: Eudicots
- Clade: Asterids
- Order: Asterales
- Family: Asteraceae
- Genus: Cirsium
- Species: C. foliosum

Binomial name
- Cirsium foliosum (Hook.) DC.

Synonyms
- Carduus foliosus Hook.; Cnicus foliosus A.Gray

= Cirsium foliosum =

Species of thistle

Cirsium foliosum, also called leafy thistle, foliose thistle, elk thistle, or Evert's thistle, is a North American plant species in the tribe Cardueae within the family Asteraceae. The species is native to Alaska, Yukon, Northwest Territories, Alberta, British Columbia, and Wyoming.

Cirsium foliosum is a biennial or perennial herb up to 70 cm (28 inches) tall, blooming only once before dying. Leaves have thin spines along the edges. There are several flowering heads per plant, with white or pale pink disc florets but no ray florets.

The roots and stems are edible raw or cooked. The stem, when split open and peeled, can be eaten like celery. Bears, deer and elk also eat the plant.

== See also ==
- Truman C. Everts
