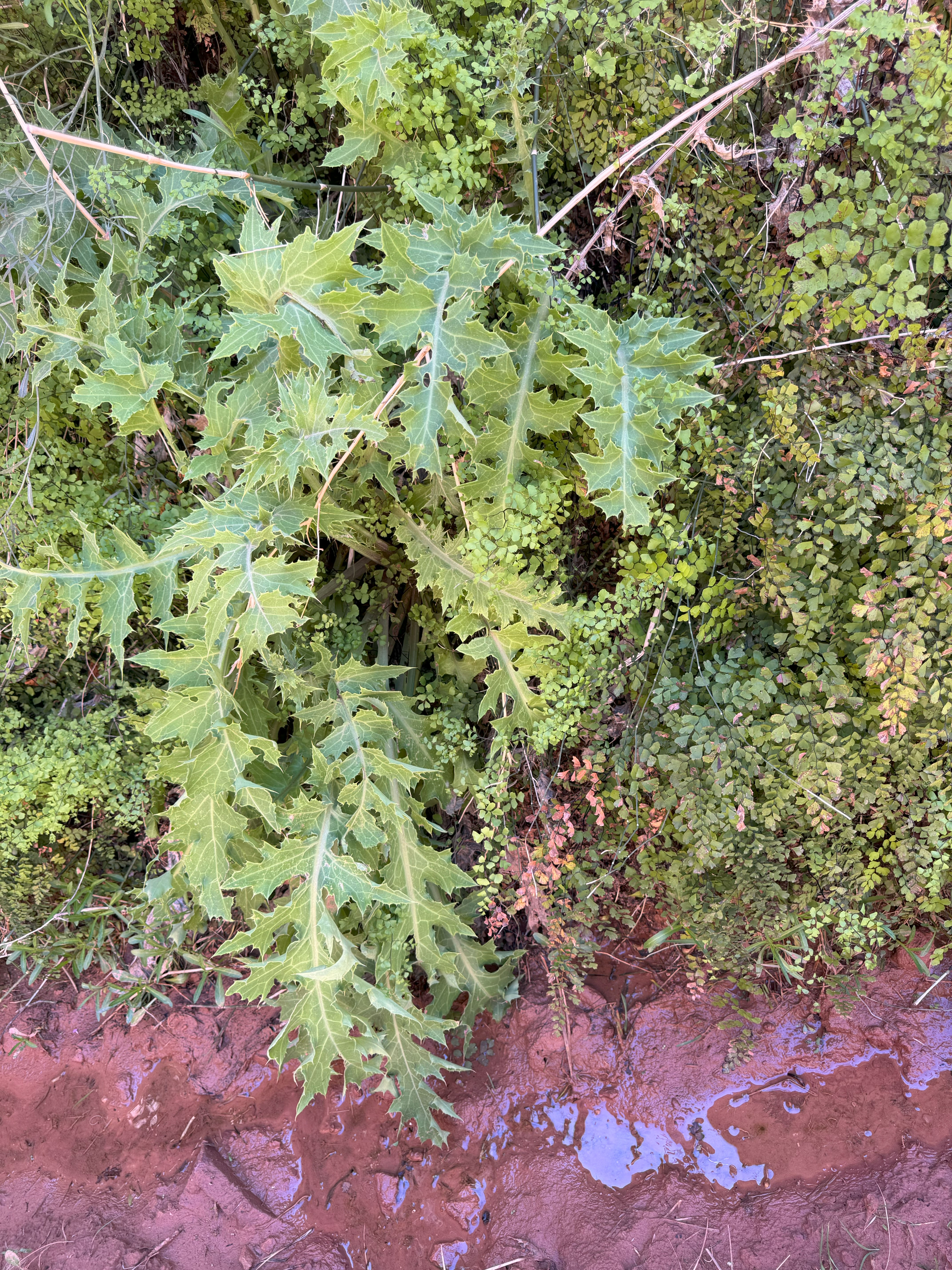

Conservation status
- Vulnerable (NatureServe)

Scientific classification
- Kingdom: Plantae
- Clade: Tracheophytes
- Clade: Angiosperms
- Clade: Eudicots
- Clade: Asterids
- Order: Asterales
- Family: Asteraceae
- Genus: Cirsium
- Species: C. rydbergii

Binomial name
- Cirsium rydbergii Petr.

Synonyms
- Cirsium lactucinum Rydb.

= Cirsium rydbergii =

Species of thistle

Cirsium rydbergii, the alcove thistle, or Rydberg's thistle, is North American species of perennial plants in the family Asteraceae, found in the Colorado Plateau and Canyonlands regions of the southwestern United States, in the States of Utah and Arizona.

Cirsium rydbergii is a large perennial herb sometimes reaching a height of 300 cm (10 feet). It has no or very few branches, and pinnately lobed leaves up to 90 cm (3 feet) long with many sharp spines but usually very few hairs. flower heads are spiny on the sides, containing white, pink, or purple disc florets but no ray florets.
