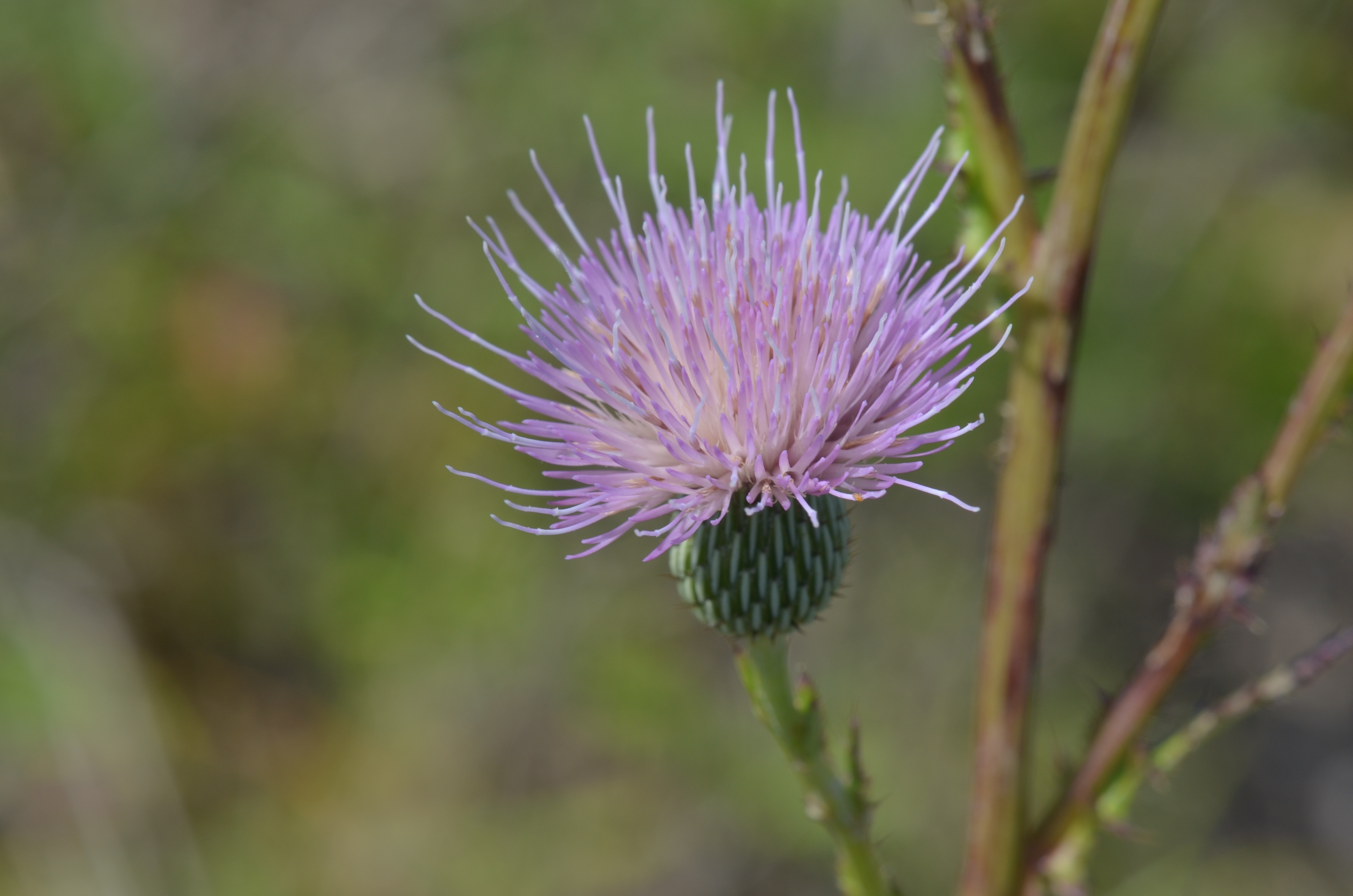

Scientific classification
- Kingdom: Plantae
- Clade: Tracheophytes
- Clade: Angiosperms
- Clade: Eudicots
- Clade: Asterids
- Order: Asterales
- Family: Asteraceae
- Genus: Cirsium
- Species: C. nuttallii

Binomial name
- Cirsium nuttallii DC.

Synonyms
- Carduus glaber Nutt. 1818 not Cirsium glabrum DC. 1805; Carduus nuttallii (DC.) Pollard; Carduus virginianus Bosc ex DC. 1838 not L. 1753; Cnicus glaber (Nutt.) Elliott; Cnicus nuttallii A.Gray

= Cirsium nuttallii =

Species of thistle

Cirsium nuttallii, called Nuttall's thistle, is a North American species of plants in the tribe Cardueae within the family Asteraceae. The species is native to the coastal plain of the southeastern and south-central United States, from eastern Texas to southeastern Virginia.

Cirsium nuttallii is a biennial or perennial herb up to 350 cm (almost 12 feet) tall, with a large taproot. Leaves are up to 60 cm (24 inches) long with thin, green on the upper side but gray to white on the underside because of numerous woolly hairs; spines along the edges of the leaves. There are a few flower heads, each head with white, pink, purple or lavender disc florets but no ray florets.
