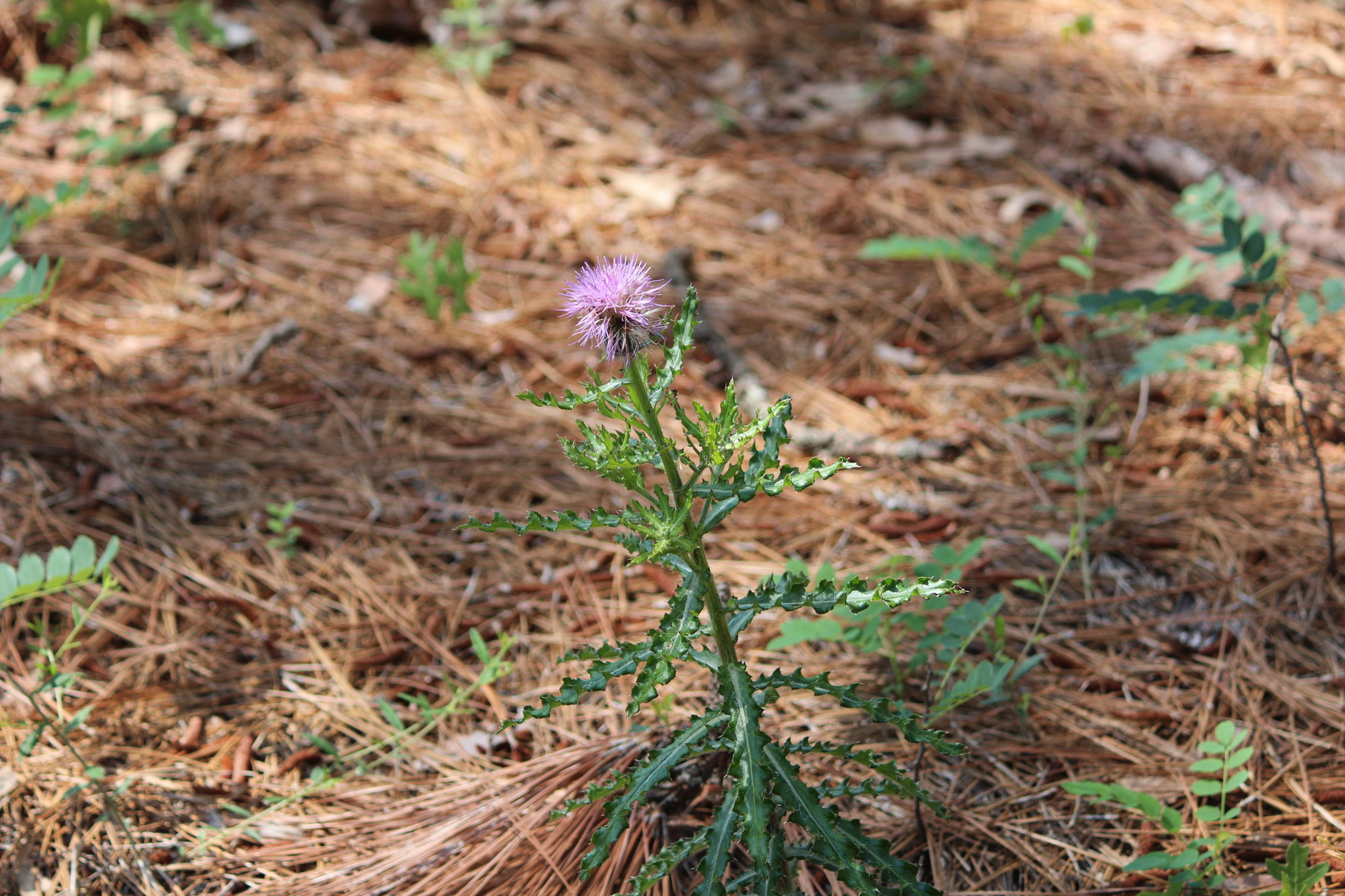

Scientific classification
- Kingdom: Plantae
- Clade: Tracheophytes
- Clade: Angiosperms
- Clade: Eudicots
- Clade: Asterids
- Order: Asterales
- Family: Asteraceae
- Genus: Cirsium
- Species: C. repandum

Binomial name
- Cirsium repandum Michx.

Synonyms
- Carduus repandus (Michx.) Pers.; Cnicus repandus Elliott

= Cirsium repandum =

Species of thistle

Cirsium repandum is a North American species of plants in the tribe Cardueae within the family Asteraceae. Common names include sand-hill thistle and coastal-plain thistle. The species is native to the south-eastern United States, the coastal plain in Virginia, Georgia, and the Carolinas.

Cirsium repandum is a biennial or perennial herb up to 80 cm (32 inches) tall. Leaves have small, narrow spines along the edges. Flower heads are sometimes produced one at a time, sometimes in small groups, each head with light purple disc florets but no ray florets. The species grows in sandy soils on sand hills or in pine barrens.
