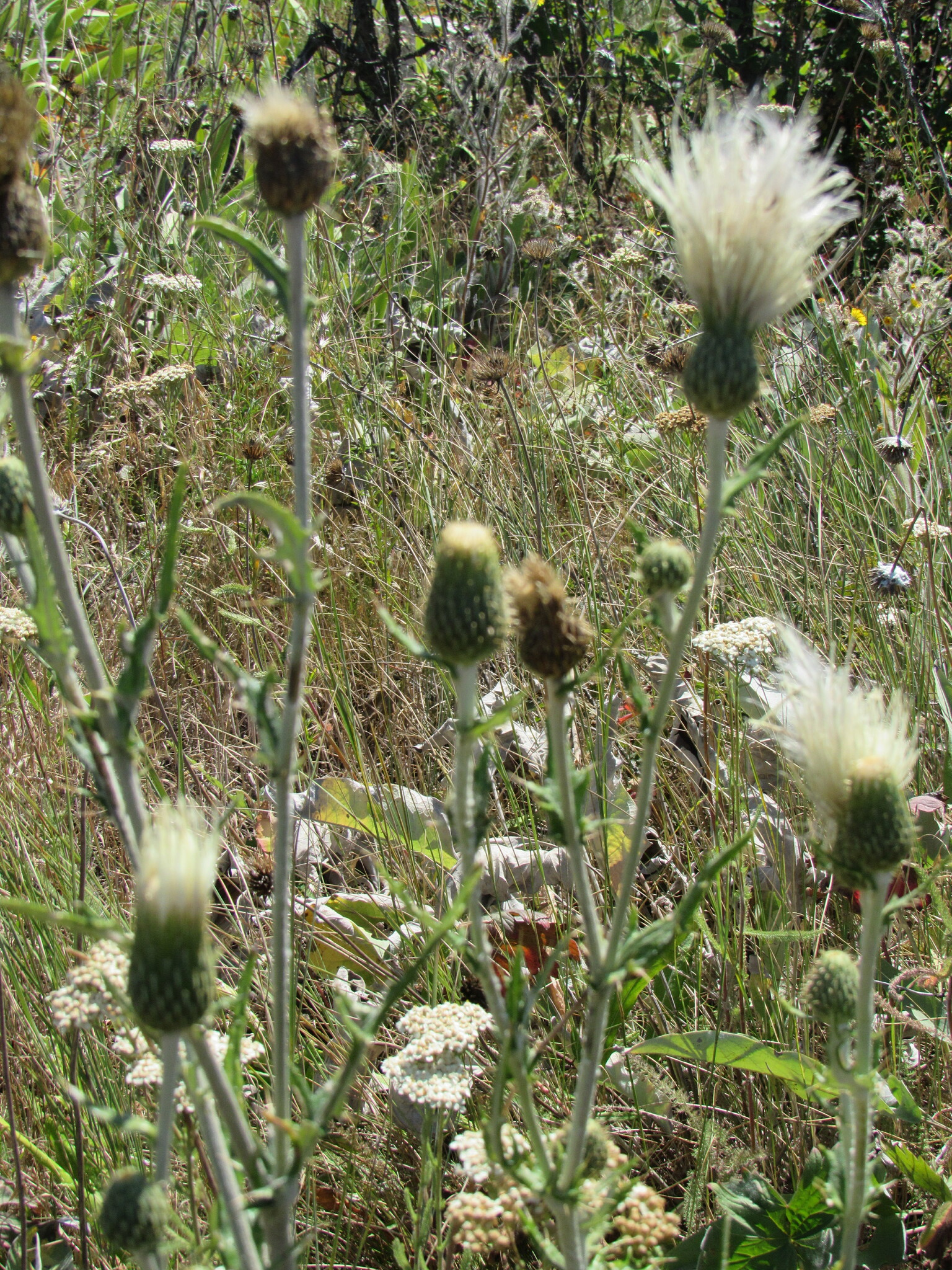

Scientific classification
- Kingdom: Plantae
- Clade: Tracheophytes
- Clade: Angiosperms
- Clade: Eudicots
- Clade: Asterids
- Order: Asterales
- Family: Asteraceae
- Genus: Cirsium
- Species: C. brevifolium

Binomial name
- Cirsium brevifolium Nutt.

Synonyms
- Carduus palousensis Piper; Cirsium palousense (Piper) Piper

= Cirsium brevifolium =

Species of thistle

Cirsium brevifolium is a North American species of plants in the tribe Cardueae within the family Asteraceae. Common name is Palouse thistle. The species is native to the northwestern United States, in the States of Washington, Oregon, and Idaho. The plant is particularly common in the Palouse Prairie near Pullman, Washington. It grows in grassy areas and along roadsides.

Cirsium brevifolium is a perennial herb up to 120 cm (4 feet) tall, with a large taproot. Leaves have spines along the edge. Sometimes there is only one flower head, sometimes a few but not many, with creamy white or pale lavender disc florets but no ray florets.
