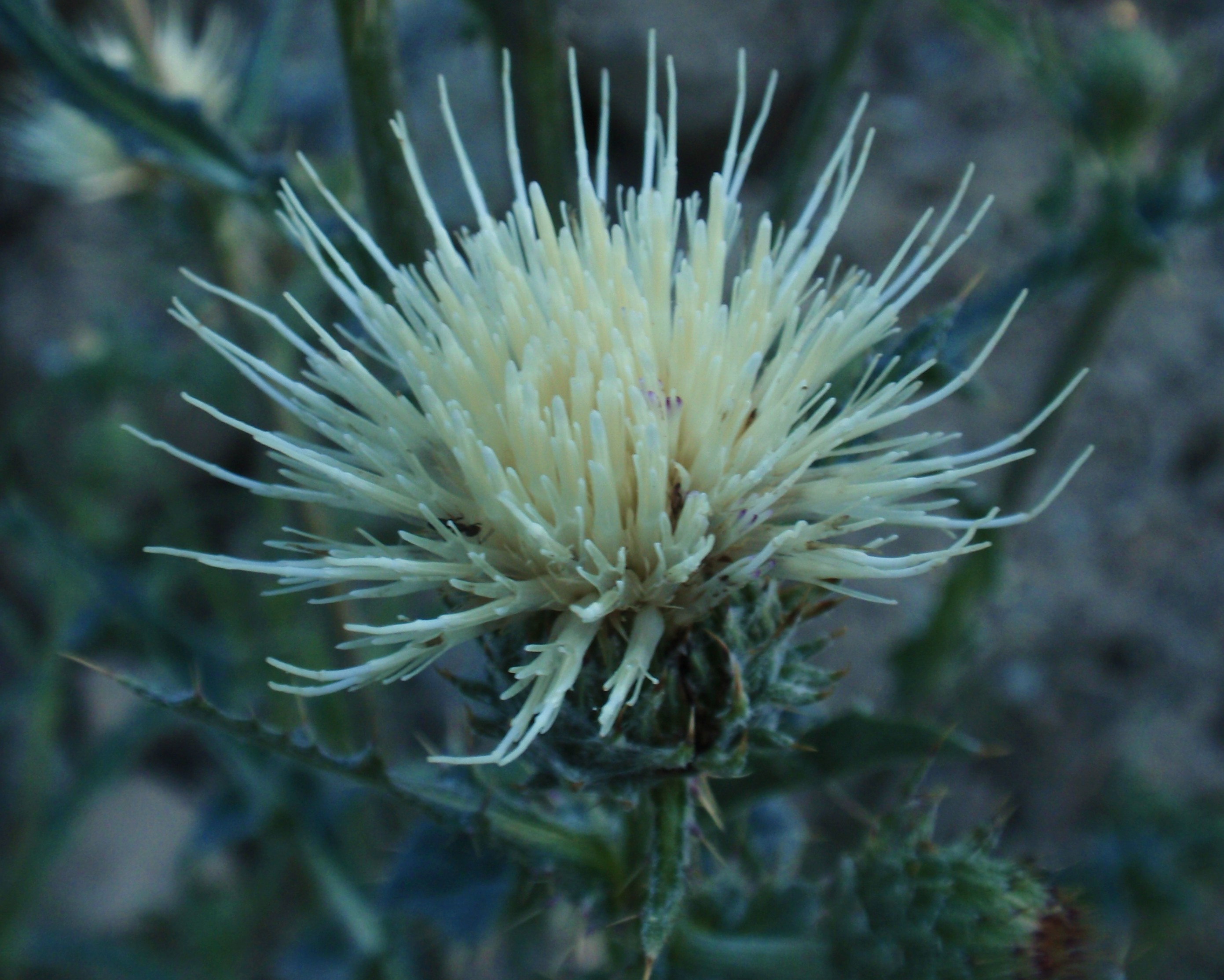

Scientific classification
- Kingdom: Plantae
- Clade: Embryophytes
- Clade: Tracheophytes
- Clade: Spermatophytes
- Clade: Angiosperms
- Clade: Eudicots
- Clade: Asterids
- Order: Asterales
- Family: Asteraceae
- Genus: Cirsium
- Species: C. cymosum

Binomial name
- Cirsium cymosum (Greene) J.T.Howell

Synonyms
- Carduus cymosus Greene; Cirsium botrys Petr; Cirsium triacanthum Petr.; Carduus canovirens Rydb., syn of var. canovirens; Cirsium canovirens (Rydb.) Petr., syn of var. canovirens

= Cirsium cymosum =

Species of thistle

Cirsium cymosum is a North American species of thistle known by the common name peregrine thistle. It is native to the western United States, where it has been found in California, Oregon, Nevada, Utah, Idaho, Wyoming, and Montana.

Cirsium cymosum is a biennial or perennial herb with a maximum height just 100 cm (39 in). It is coated in soft and coarse hairs and sometimes cobwebby fibers. The spiny leaves may reach 30 to 50 centimeters (12 to 20 inches) in length, especially toward the base of the stem. They are deeply cut into lobes which are lined with sharp teeth. The inflorescence is a cluster of flower heads each up to 3 centimeters long and 5 wide. The head is lined with sticky, spiny phyllaries and filled with dull white flowers. The fruit is an achene with a dark-colored body just under a centimeter long and a pappus of hairs up to 2.5 centimetres (0.98 inches) in length.

Varieties

- Cirsium cymosum var. canovirens (Rydb.) D.J.Keil - most of species range
- Cirsium cymosum var. cymosum - California, Nevada, Oregon
