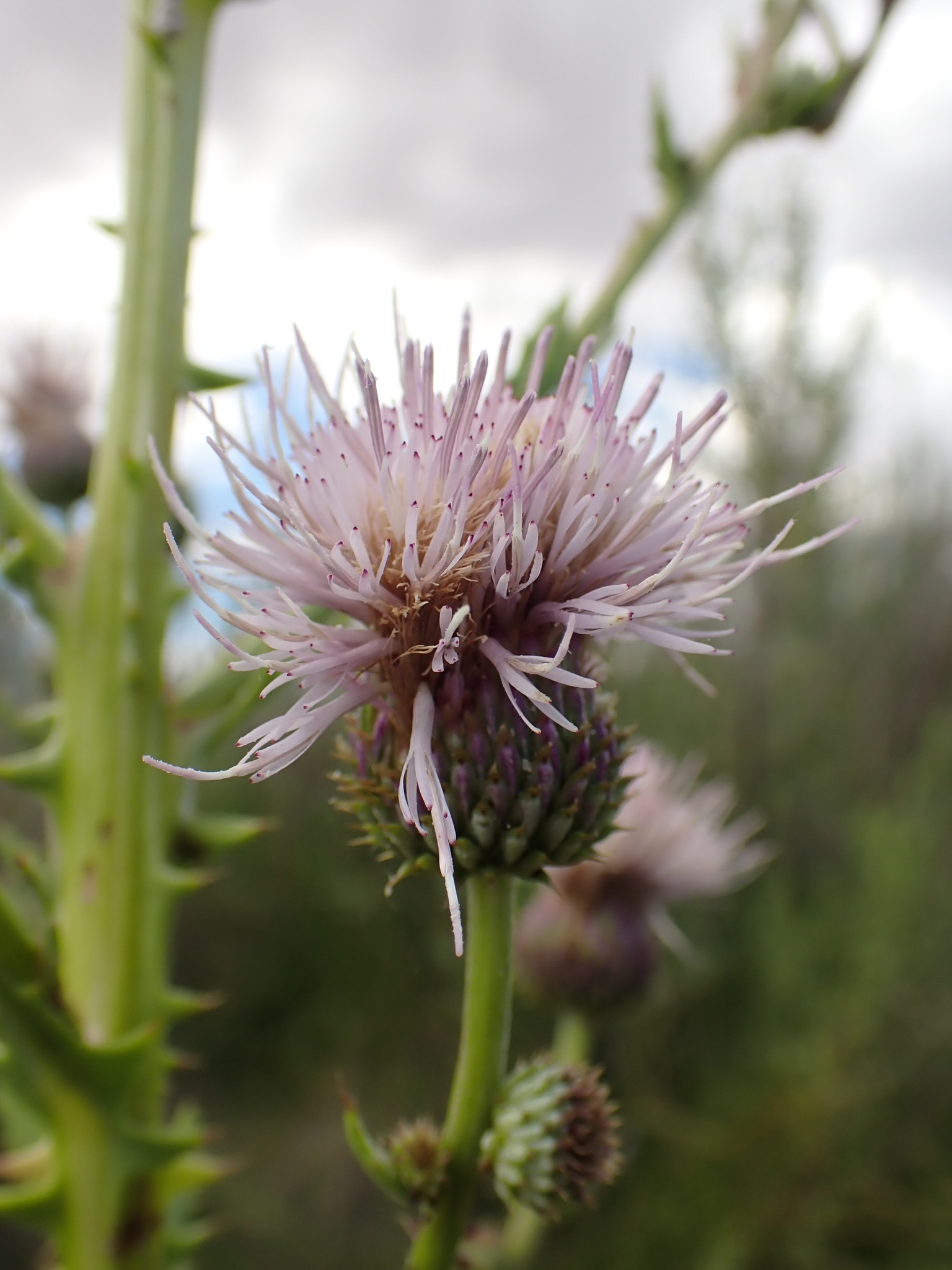

Conservation status
- Imperiled (NatureServe)

Scientific classification
- Kingdom: Plantae
- Clade: Tracheophytes
- Clade: Angiosperms
- Clade: Eudicots
- Clade: Asterids
- Order: Asterales
- Family: Asteraceae
- Genus: Cirsium
- Species: C. wrightii

Binomial name
- Cirsium wrightii A.Gray

Synonyms
- Carduus wrightii A.Heller; Cnicus wrightii (A. Gray) A. Gray

= Cirsium wrightii =

Species of thistle

Cirsium wrightii, or Wright's marsh thistle, is an endangered species of North American plants in the family Asteraceae. It is a monocarpic perennial sometimes reaching as much as 300 cm (10 feet) in height.

The species was originally collected in 1851 in Arizona by Charles Wright.

== Distribution ==
Wright's marsh thistle is known to be found at the present time in only 7 counties in South-Central New Mexico. It has also, however, known to have existed in the past in Sonora, Chihuahua, Texas and Arizona. There are many hypotheses over what caused the shrinkage of the species, of which one is drought. Since these are wetland plants, a decrease in water has detrimental effects on their survival.

== Habitat and ecology ==
Since it is a wetland residing plant, this species prefers moist environments, such as mountain slopes, forests, and marshes on the edges of rivers and ponds. These plants are most commonly found in low-elevation wetlands in the barren desert, and occur often in alkaline soils. It is a monocarpic perennial (or a biennial), and flowers in its second year from August to October. This species is known to interact with Cirsium texanum and Cirsium vinaceum and some hybrids have even been spotted.

== Morphology ==
Wright's marsh thistle is most known for its extraordinary height of up to 300 cm (10 feet). It has a central stalk with leaves and various flowering branches up the stem. Wright's marsh thistle has prickly spines that protrude from the central stalk. It consists of a single stalk that is swathed with leaves. These stem leaves, along with the basal leaves, are both succulent. The basal leaves are prickly and can average about 30 cm in measurement. Many branches arise from the top of the stalk, of which the longest branches are the flowering ones. Each of the many branches has a flowering head at the end. The style tips are 3 mm long, and can be either white or pale pink.

== Conservation status ==
Cirsium wrightii, according to the United States Fish and Wildlife Service, is listed as Threatened endangered species list.

Based on a study done by the WildEarth Guardians Organization, Cirsium wrightii has a high chance of grappling with the risk of extinction due to some of the aforementioned threats. They filed a petition on October 9, 2008 for this species to be added to the Endangered Species Act.

=== Causes of threat ===
There are a number of threats to this plant. Because it is a marshland plant, it needs ongoing and abundant access to water. Unfortunately, the environments that it resides in are susceptible to drought. Water availability is dependent on yearly percolation patterns. Habitat loss is also a cause of threat, as it results in competition with new introduced and sometimes invasive species.
