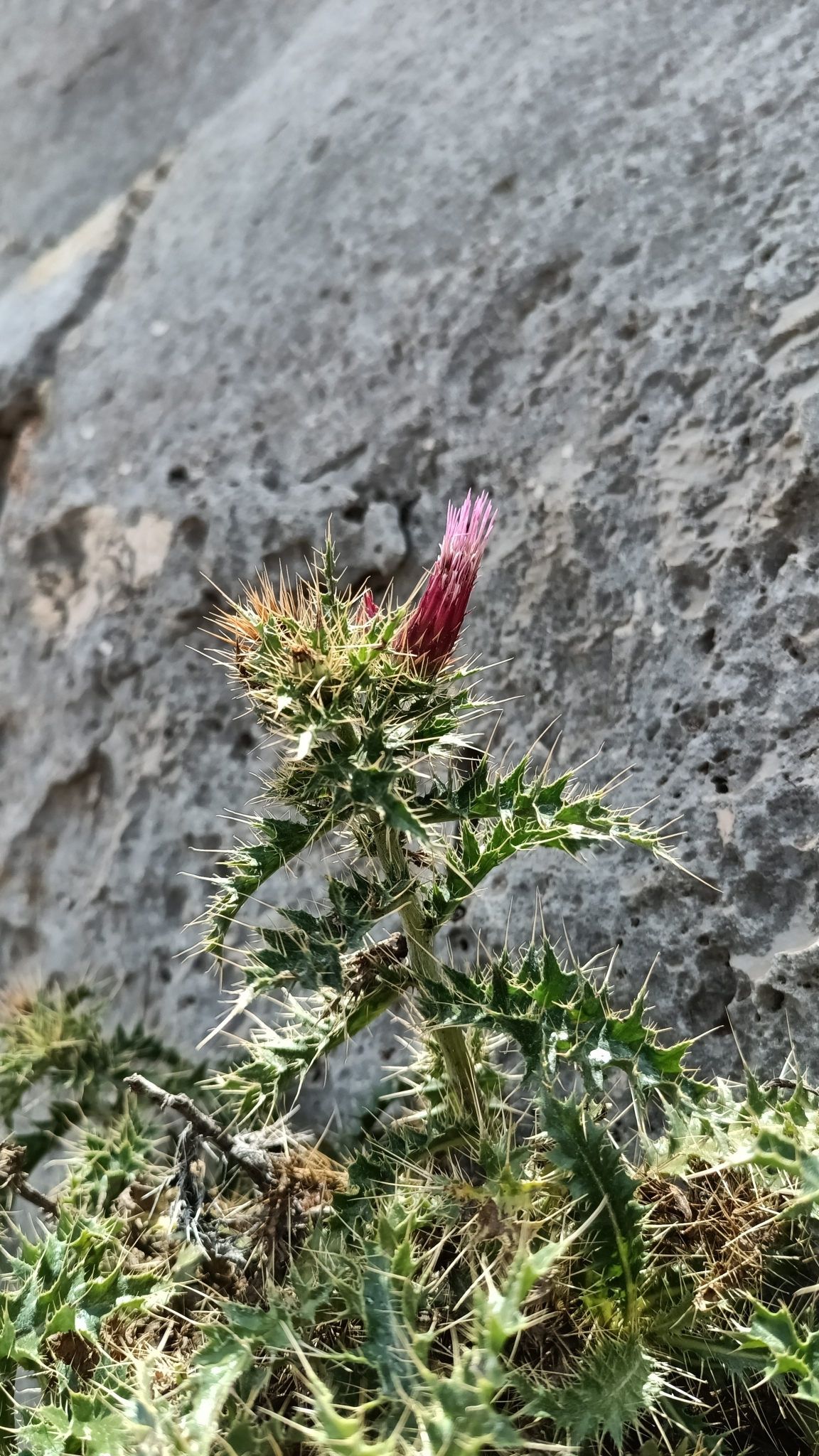

Scientific classification
- Kingdom: Plantae
- Clade: Embryophytes
- Clade: Tracheophytes
- Clade: Spermatophytes
- Clade: Angiosperms
- Clade: Eudicots
- Clade: Asterids
- Order: Asterales
- Family: Asteraceae
- Genus: Cirsium
- Species: C. turneri

Binomial name
- Cirsium turneri Warnock

= Cirsium turneri =

Species of thistle

Cirsium turneri is a North American species of plants in the tribe Cardueae within the family Asteraceae. Common names include cliff thistle. The species grows in crevices in limestone cliffs in northern Mexico (Chihuahua, Coahuila) and western Texas (Brewster, Terrell, Val Verde Counties).

Cirsium turneri is a perennial herb up to 45 cm (18 inches) tall. Leaves have small, narrow spines along the edges. Flower heads are sometimes produced one at a time, sometimes in small groups, each head with red or reddish-purple disc florets but no ray florets.
