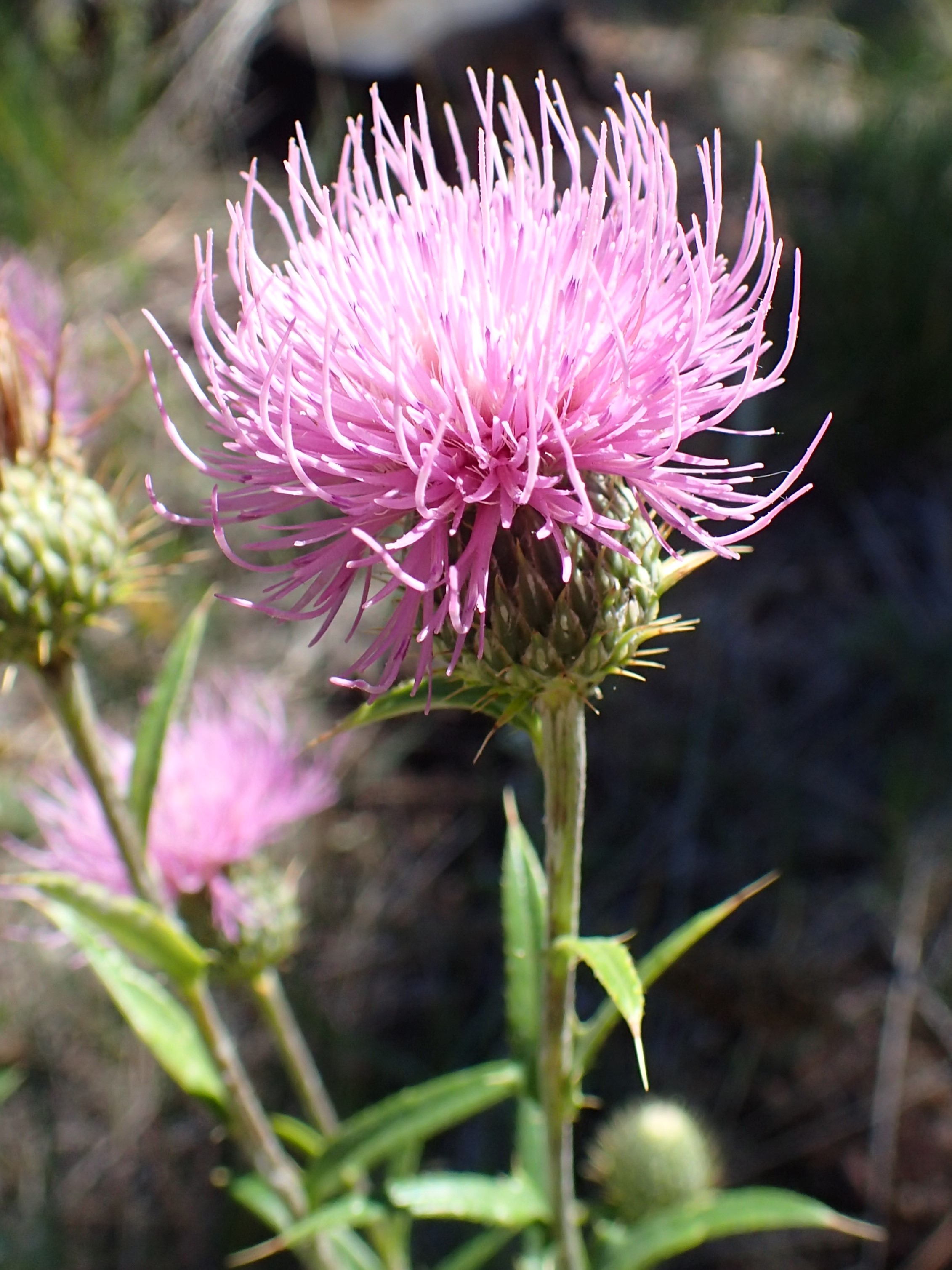

Conservation status
- Vulnerable (NatureServe)

Scientific classification
- Kingdom: Plantae
- Clade: Tracheophytes
- Clade: Angiosperms
- Clade: Eudicots
- Clade: Asterids
- Order: Asterales
- Family: Asteraceae
- Genus: Cirsium
- Species: C. wheeleri

Binomial name
- Cirsium wheeleri (A.Gray) Petr.

Synonyms
- Carduus perennans Greene; Carduus wheeleri (A.Gray) A.Heller; Cirsium blumeri Petr.; Cirsium perennans (Greene) Wooton & Standl.; Cnicus wheeleri A.Gray

= Cirsium wheeleri =

Species of thistle

Cirsium wheeleri is a North American species of plants in the tribe Cardueae within the family Asteraceae. Common names include Wheeler's thistle. It is native to northern Mexico (Chihuahua, Sonora) and the southwestern United States (Arizona, New Mexico, Colorado, Utah, Nevada).

Cirsium wheeleri is a perennial herb up to 60 cm (2 feet) tall with a large taproots. Leaves have slender spines. There are one or more flower heads, each with white, pink, or pale purple disc florets but no ray florets. The plant grows in mountain meadows and open conifer forests.
