= Cirsium ownbeyi =

Conservation status
- Vulnerable (NatureServe)

Scientific classification
- Kingdom: Plantae
- Clade: Tracheophytes
- Clade: Angiosperms
- Clade: Eudicots
- Clade: Asterids
- Order: Asterales
- Family: Asteraceae
- Genus: Cirsium
- Species: C. ownbeyi

Binomial name
- Cirsium ownbeyi S.L.Welsh

Species of thistle

Cirsium ownbeyi, or Ownbey's thistle, is a rare North American species of flowering plant in the family Asteraceae. It is endemic to the United States, where it has a narrow distribution in northeast Utah, southwest Wyoming, and northwest Colorado. There are around 30 known populations with a total of approximately 25,000 individuals.

== Description ==
Cirsium ownbeyi is a perennial herb growing 30 to 70 centimeters (12-28 inches) tall from a taproot and branched caudex. There are one or more erect stems. The leaves are up to 30 centimeters (12 inches) long. The flower heads are oval and up to 2.5 centimeters (1 inch) long and wide. They are coated in green phyllaries with spines up to a centimeter long. The head contains white, pink, or purplish flowers up to 2 centimeters long. Blooming occurs in June through August. The fruit may be 2 centimeters long including its long pappus.

== Habitat ==
This plant grows in sagebrush, juniper-dominated habitat, and riparian zones. The substrate is usually sandstone, but sometimes limestone.

== Conservation ==
This species grows in Dinosaur National Monument, where it is threatened by disturbance caused by park visitors. It is also threatened by the seed-eating weevil Rhinocyllus conicus, which was introduced to the area as an agent of biological pest control against musk thistle {Carduus nutans).
