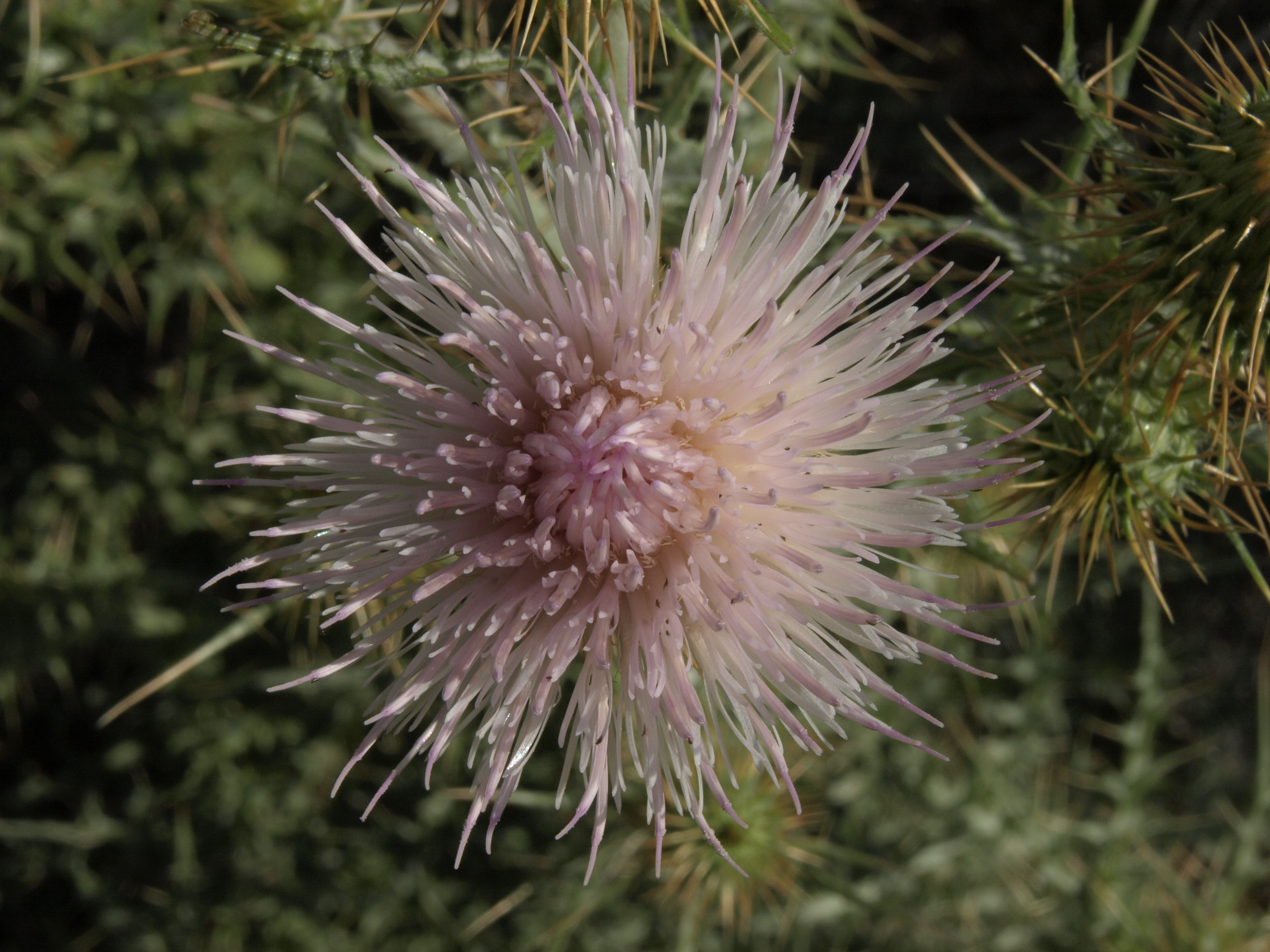

Conservation status
- Vulnerable (NatureServe)

Scientific classification
- Kingdom: Plantae
- Clade: Embryophytes
- Clade: Tracheophytes
- Clade: Spermatophytes
- Clade: Angiosperms
- Clade: Eudicots
- Clade: Asterids
- Order: Asterales
- Family: Asteraceae
- Genus: Cirsium
- Species: C. mohavense

Binomial name
- Cirsium mohavense (Greene) Petr.

Synonyms
- Carduus mohavensis Greene; Carduus rusbyi Greene; Cirsium rusbyi (Greene) Petr.; Cirsium virginense S.L.Welsh

= Cirsium mohavense =

Species of thistle

Cirsium mohavense is a species of thistle known by the common names virgin thistle and Mojave thistle. It is native to the southwestern United States, where it grows in moist areas in otherwise dry habitat, such as desert springs. It is most common in the Mojave Desert, found also in the southern Great Basin and other nearby regions of California, Nevada, western Arizona, and southwestern Utah.

Cirsium mohavense is a biennial or perennial growing up to 2.5 meters (100 inches or 8 feet 4 inches) tall. The densely woolly stem branches and spreads near the top. The leaves are toothed to deeply lobed, woolly, spiny, and up to 60 centimeters (24 inches) long near the base of the plant. The inflorescence is a spreading array of clusters of flower heads, each generally less than 3 centimeters long and wide. The flower head is coated in spiny phyllaries and filled with white, lavender, or pink flowers. The fruit is an achene a few millimeters long with a pappus on top about 1.5 centimeters long.
