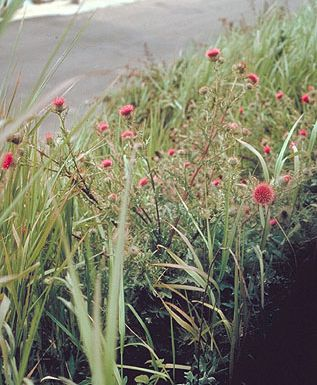

Conservation status
- Vulnerable (NatureServe)

Scientific classification
- Kingdom: Plantae
- Clade: Embryophytes
- Clade: Tracheophytes
- Clade: Angiosperms
- Clade: Eudicots
- Clade: Asterids
- Order: Asterales
- Family: Asteraceae
- Genus: Cirsium
- Species: C. andrewsii

Binomial name
- Cirsium andrewsii (A.Gray) Petr.

Synonyms
- Carduus andersonii (A.Gray) Greene; Cnicus andersonii A.Gray

= Cirsium andrewsii =

Species of thistle

Cirsium andrewsii is an uncommon species of thistle known by the common name Franciscan thistle. It is endemic to California, where it is known from the coastline of the San Francisco Bay Area from Marin to San Mateo Counties. There are also reports of isolated populations in the Klamath Mountains and in the Sierra Nevada.

Cirsium andrewsii grows in coastal habitats such as sea bluffs and canyons, and is sometimes found on serpentine soils. The species is biennial to perennial, producing an erect, leafy stem which can reach two meters in height. It is highly branched, dense to clumpy, fleshy, and cobwebby with fibers, especially when new. The leaves are woolly or cobwebby, spiny along the edges, and sometimes lack lobes or deep cuts. They are borne on petioles with winged, spiny margins, some spines exceeding a centimeter in length. The inflorescence produces one or more flower heads, each up to 3 centimeters long by 5 wide, wispy with cobwebby fibers, and lined with very spiny phyllaries. The flower head is packed with dark purplish-pink flowers up to about 2.5 centimeters in length. The fruit is an achene with a dark brown body about half a centimeter long and a pappus about 1.5 centimeters long.
