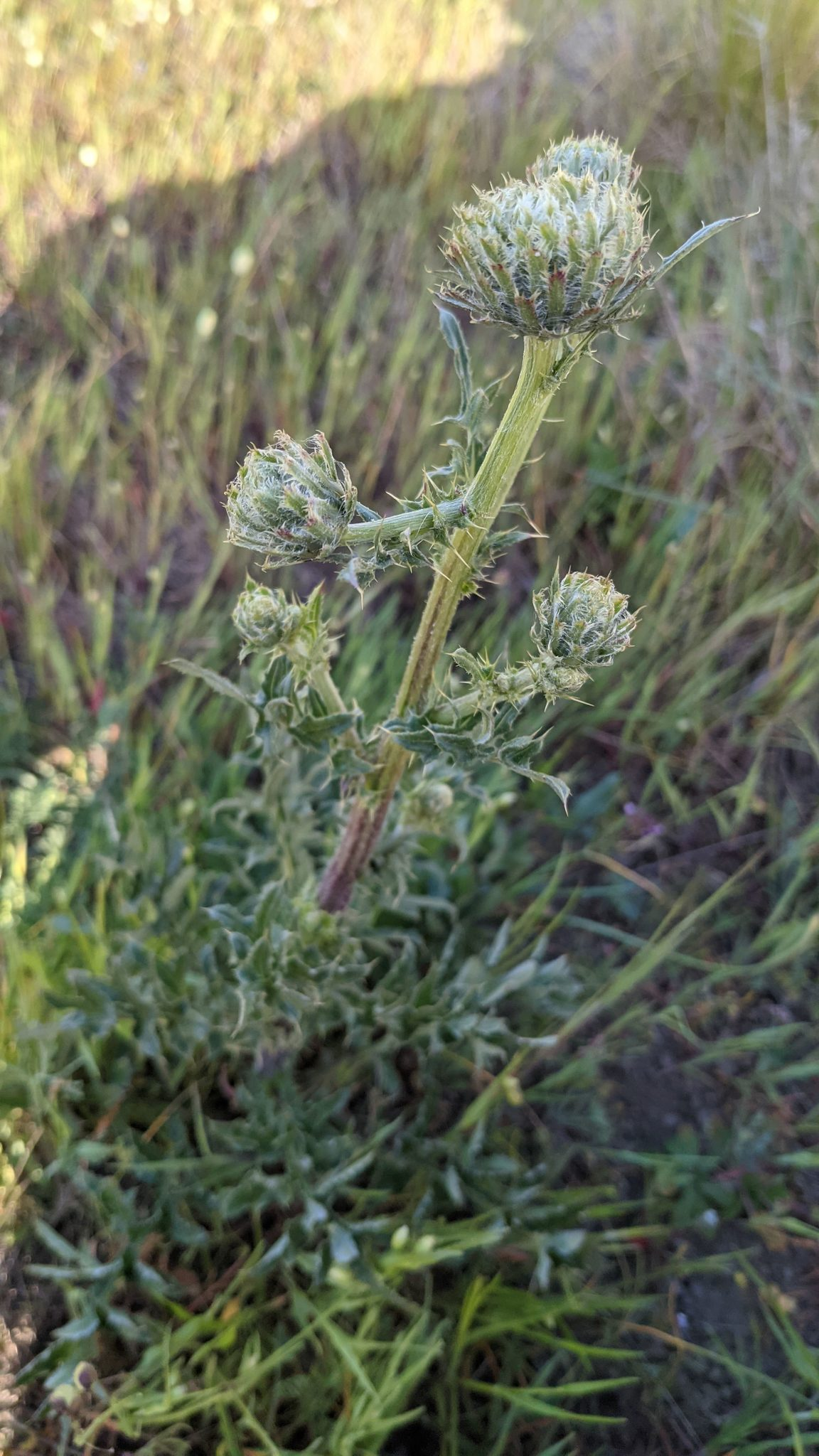

Scientific classification
- Kingdom: Plantae
- Clade: Tracheophytes
- Clade: Angiosperms
- Clade: Eudicots
- Clade: Asterids
- Order: Asterales
- Family: Asteraceae
- Genus: Cirsium
- Species: C. remotifolium

Binomial name
- Cirsium remotifolium (Hook.) DC.

= Cirsium remotifolium =

Species of thistle

Cirsium remotifolium is a species of thistle known by the common name fewleaf thistle. It is native to the western United States, including the Pacific Coast and possibly as far east as the Rocky Mountains, depending on which populations are treated as part of the species. It is sometimes part of the serpentine soils flora. This native thistle is a perennial herb growing up to about 1.5 meters tall. The leaves are borne on spiny petioles and are toothed or lobed, the lowest leaves at the base of the stem reaching 50 centimeters in length. The inflorescence is made up of clustered flower heads which are lined with spiny phyllaries. The head is filled with white or purple flowers up to 2.5 centimeters long. The fruit is an achene a few millimeters long topped with a pappus up to about 2 centimeters in length.
