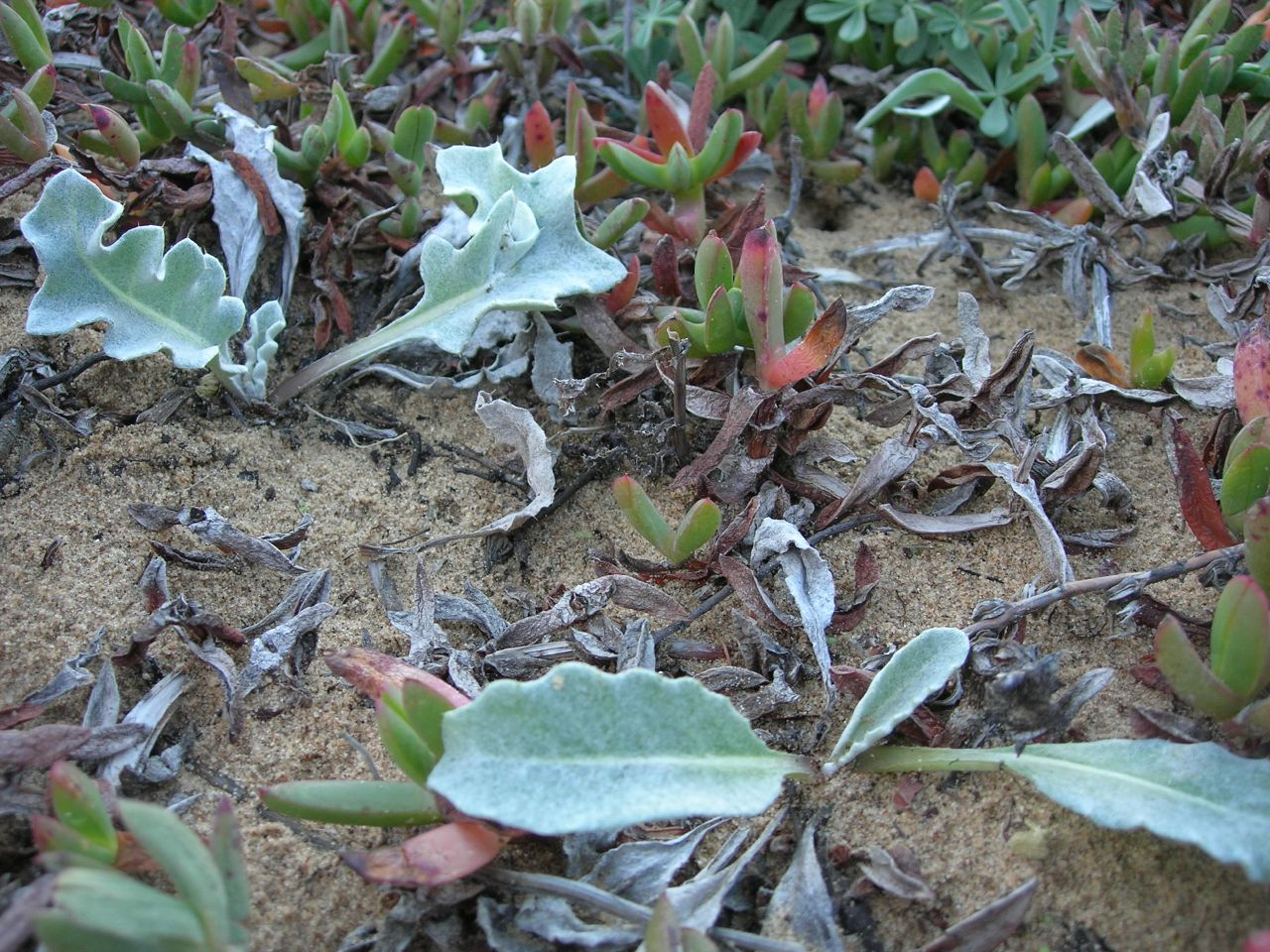

Scientific classification
- Kingdom: Plantae
- Clade: Tracheophytes
- Clade: Angiosperms
- Clade: Eudicots
- Clade: Asterids
- Order: Asterales
- Family: Asteraceae
- Genus: Cirsium
- Species: C. rhothophilum

Binomial name
- Cirsium rhothophilum S.F.Blake

Synonyms
- Carduus maritima Elmer 1905; Cirsium maritimum (Elmer) Petr. 1914, illegitimate homonym not Makino 1910 nor Davidson & Moxley 1923

= Cirsium rhothophilum =

Species of thistle

Cirsium rhothophilum is a rare North American species of thistle known by the common name surf thistle. It is endemic to California, where it is known only from the coastline around the border between San Luis Obispo and Santa Barbara Counties. It grows in sand dunes and coastal scrub near the beach.

Cirsium rhothophilum grows up to 100 cm (39 in) tall with fleshy, woolly herbage usually forming a mound. The thick leaves are wavy and covered in feltlike hairs. They may have smooth, lobed, or toothed edges and small spines. The largest leaves at the base of the plant may reach 25 centimetres (9.8 inches) in length. The inflorescence bears several clustered flower heads, each head up to 4 centimeters long and 6 cm wide. The heads are lined with woolly phyllaries and filled with off-white to pale yellowish disc florets but no ray florets. The fruit is an achene a few millimeters long with a pappus up to 2 centimeters in length.
