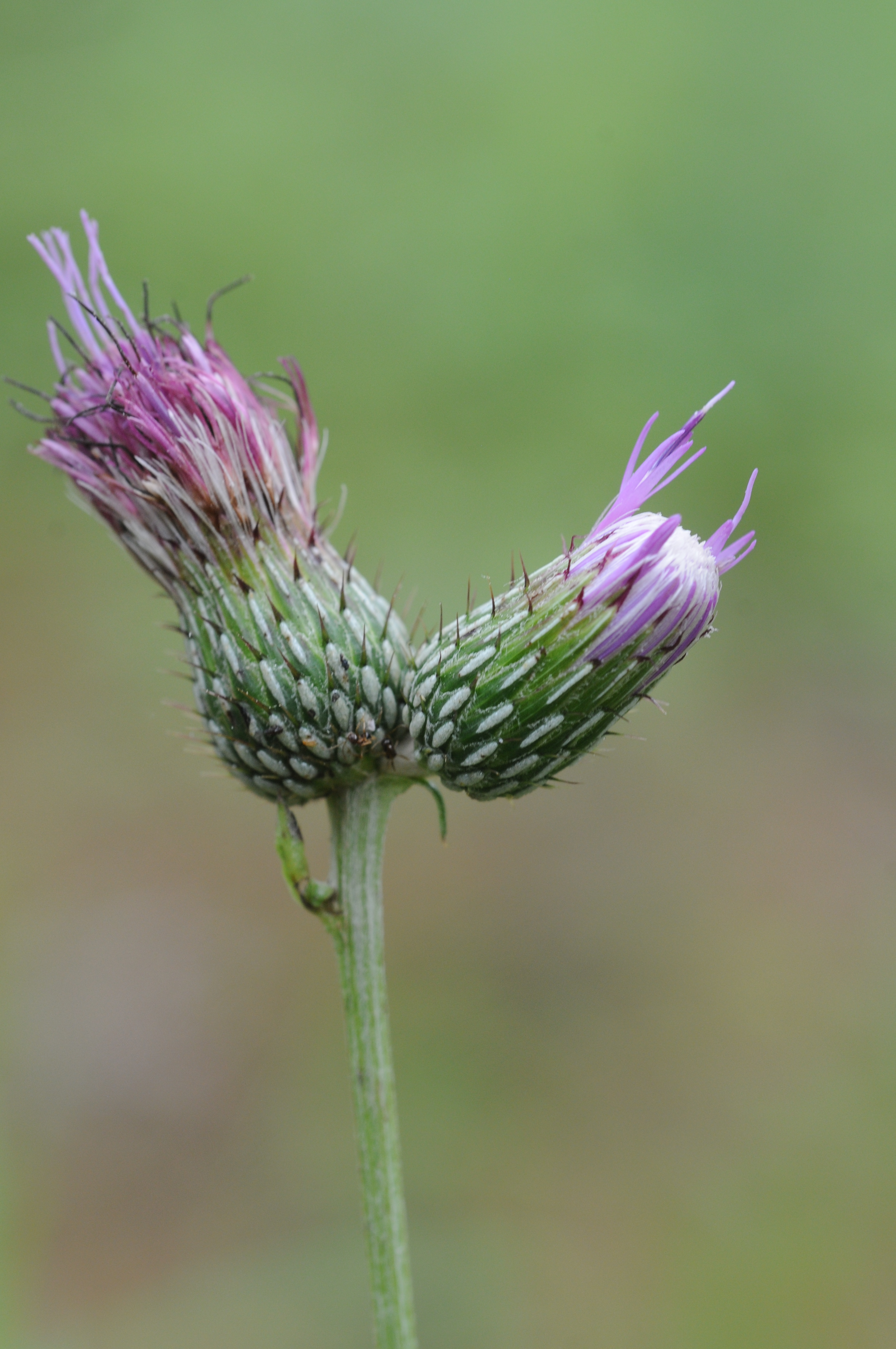

Scientific classification
- Kingdom: Plantae
- Clade: Tracheophytes
- Clade: Angiosperms
- Clade: Eudicots
- Clade: Asterids
- Order: Asterales
- Family: Asteraceae
- Genus: Cirsium
- Species: C. carolinianum

Binomial name
- Cirsium carolinianum (Walter) Fernald & B. G. Schubert

Synonyms
- Carduus carolinianus Walter; Carthamus carolinianus Walter; Cirsium flaccidum Small

= Cirsium carolinianum =

Species of thistle

Cirsium carolinianum is a North American species of plants in the tribe Cardueae within the family Asteraceae. Common name is Carolina thistle or purple thistle or soft thistle or smallhead thistle. The species is native to the central and southern United States, from eastern Texas east to Virginia and the Carolinas, north to the Ohio Valley.

Cirsium carolinianum is a biennial herb up to 180 cm (6 feet) tall, with a relatively short taproot. Leaves have small, thin spines along the edge, much smaller than those of related species. There are usually several flower heads, with pinkish-purple (rarely white) disc florets but no ray florets. Flowers bloom April to July. Its habitats include wooded areas, fields, and roadsides.
