= Cirsium pulcherrimum =

Conservation status
- Secure (NatureServe)

Scientific classification
- Kingdom: Plantae
- Clade: Tracheophytes
- Clade: Angiosperms
- Clade: Eudicots
- Clade: Asterids
- Order: Asterales
- Family: Asteraceae
- Genus: Cirsium
- Species: C. pulcherrimum

Binomial name
- Cirsium pulcherrimum (Rydb.) K.Schum.

Synonyms
- Carduus pulcherrimus Rydb.; Cirsium aridum Dorn, syn of var. aridum

Species of thistle

Cirsium pulcherrimum, the Wyoming thistle , is a North American species of plants in the tribe Cardueae within the family Asteraceae. The species is native to the western United States, primarily in the state of Wyoming but also in surrounding areas (Montana, Colorado, eastern Idaho, western Nebraska, northeastern Utah, and the Black Hills of South Dakota).

Cirsium pulcherrimum is a perennial herb up to 90 cm (36 inches or 3 feet) tall, with a large taproot, blooming more than once (unlike many of its relatives, which die after blooming). Leaves are up to 25 cm (10 inches) long with thin spines along the edges of the leaves. There are a few flower heads, each head with pink, purple or cream-colored disc florets but no ray florets.

Varieties

- Cirsium pulcherrimum var. aridum (Dorn) D.J.Keil - Carbon, Fremont, + Sweetwater Counties in Wyoming
- Cirsium pulcherrimum var. pulcherrimum - most of species range
