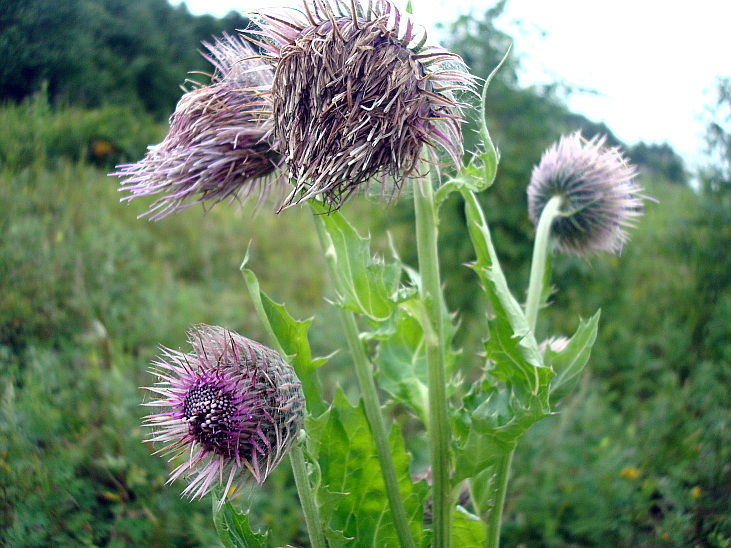

Scientific classification
- Kingdom: Plantae
- Clade: Tracheophytes
- Clade: Angiosperms
- Clade: Eudicots
- Clade: Asterids
- Order: Asterales
- Family: Asteraceae
- Genus: Cirsium
- Species: C. kamtschaticum

Binomial name
- Cirsium kamtschaticum Ledeb. ex DC.

Synonyms
- Cirsium boreale Kitam.; Cirsium weyrichii Maxim.; Cnicus kamtschaticus (Ledeb. ex DC.) Maxim.; Cnicus korsakoviensis (H.Lév. & Vaniot) H.Lév. & Vaniot; Cnicus weyrichii (Maxim.) Maxim.

= Cirsium kamtschaticum =

Species of thistle

Cirsium kamtschaticum, the Kamchatka thistle, is an Alaskan and East Asian species of plants in the tribe Cardueae within the family Asteraceae. The species is found in eastern Russia (Kamchatka Peninsula, Sakhalin Island and the Kuril Islands), and on certain islands of the North Pacific: the Aleutian Islands of Alaska and Hokkaido Island in northern Japan.

Cirsium kamtschaticum is a biennial or perennial herb up to 200 cm (80 inches) tall, with a thick underground rhizome. Leaves are up to 40 cm (16 inches) long with thin, bristly spines along the edges. There are a few flower heads, each head with pink or purple disc florets but no ray florets. It grows in meadows and tundra.
