= Cirsium durangense =

Scientific classification
- Kingdom: Plantae
- Clade: Tracheophytes
- Clade: Angiosperms
- Clade: Eudicots
- Clade: Asterids
- Order: Asterales
- Family: Asteraceae
- Genus: Cirsium
- Species: C. durangense

Binomial name
- Cirsium durangense (Greenm.) G.B.Ownbey

Synonyms
- Cirsium ochrocentrum var. durangense Greenm.

Species of thistle

Cirsium durangense, the Durango thistle , is Mexican species of plants in the tribe Cardueae within the family Asteraceae. The species is native to the State of Durango in northwestern Mexico.

Cirsium durangense has pinnately lobed leaves with spines on the tips of the lobes. The leaves have a woolly covering when they are young but this disappears as the leaves mature.
