= Cirsium italicum =

Scientific classification
- Kingdom: Plantae
- Clade: Tracheophytes
- Clade: Angiosperms
- Clade: Eudicots
- Clade: Asterids
- Order: Asterales
- Family: Asteraceae
- Tribe: Cardueae
- Subtribe: Carduinae
- Genus: Cirsium
- Species: C. italicum

Binomial name
- Cirsium italicum DC.

Synonyms
- Carduus italicus (DC.) Savi (1818); Cnicus italicus (DC.) Seb. & Mauri (1818); Epitrachys italica (DC.) Bureš, Del Guacchio, Iamonico & P.Caputo; Eriolepis italica (DC.) Cass. (1827)

Genus of flowering plants

Cirsium italicum is a species of flowering plant in the sunflower family, Asteraceae. It is a thistle native to Europe and Turkey, ranging from Germany, France, and Italy to Albania, Greece, Bulgaria, and northwestern Turkey.

The species was first named by Augustin Pyramus de Candolle in 1813.
