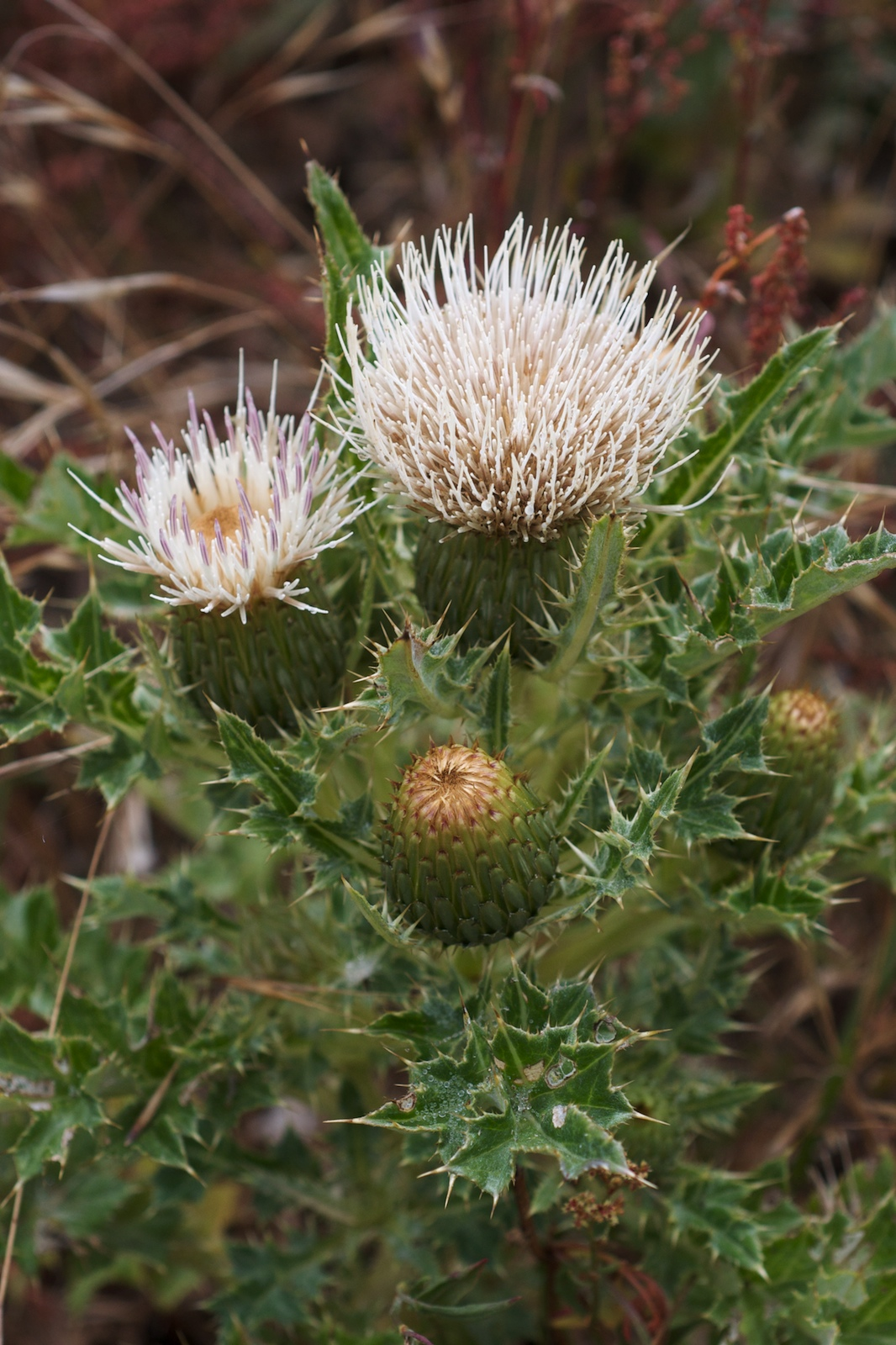

Conservation status
- Vulnerable (NatureServe)

Scientific classification
- Kingdom: Plantae
- Clade: Embryophytes
- Clade: Tracheophytes
- Clade: Spermatophytes
- Clade: Angiosperms
- Clade: Eudicots
- Clade: Asterids
- Order: Asterales
- Family: Asteraceae
- Genus: Cirsium
- Species: C. quercetorum

Binomial name
- Cirsium quercetorum (Gray) Jeps.

Synonyms
- Carduus quercetorum (A.Gray) Greene; Cirsium walkerianum Petr.; Cnicus quercetorum A.Gray

= Cirsium quercetorum =

Species of thistle

Cirsium quercetorum is a species of thistle endemic to coastal California, its common names include brownie thistle and Alameda thistle.

== Distribution ==
Cirsium quercetorum is endemic to the Outer California Coast Ranges from Santa Barbara's Point Conception north into the San Francisco Bay Area and up the North Coast as far as Humboldt County. This is a common plant found in coastal grasslands and open woodlands.

== Description ==
The perennial Cirsium quercetorum plant usually grows clumped low to the ground, less than 20 cm (8 inches) tall, but occasionally the plant grows erect and can reach 90 cm (36 inches) in height. It has spiny lobed toothy leaves and spiny flower heads with brownish ivory-tan white to purple disc florets but no ray florets.
