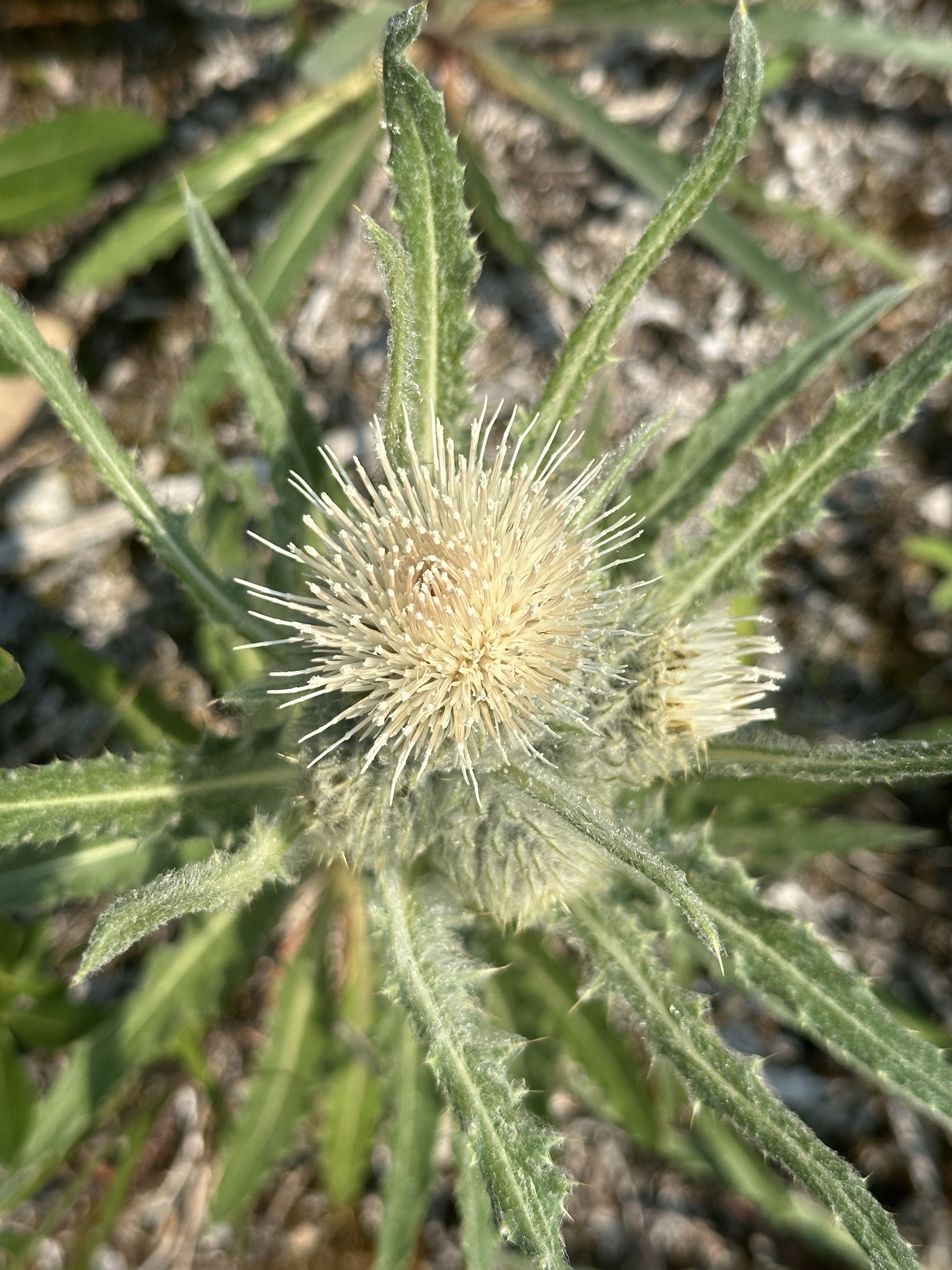

Scientific classification
- Kingdom: Plantae
- Clade: Tracheophytes
- Clade: Angiosperms
- Clade: Eudicots
- Clade: Asterids
- Order: Asterales
- Family: Asteraceae
- Genus: Cirsium
- Species: C. hookerianum

Binomial name
- Cirsium hookerianum Nutt.

Synonyms
- Carduus hookerianus (A.Gray) A.Heller; Cnicus hookerianus A.Gray

= Cirsium hookerianum =

Species of thistle

Cirsium hookerianum, Hooker's thistle or white thistle, is a North American species of thistle native to western Canada and the northwestern United States. It is found in the northern Rocky Mountains as well as in some of the northern Cascades and Coast Ranges, in Alberta, British Columbia, Washington, Idaho, Montana, and Wyoming.

Cirsium hookerianum is biennial or perennial herb up to 150 cm (60 inches) tall, with a large taproot. Leaves are green on top, usually white and woolly underneath, with spines along the edges. There are usually several flower heads with white or pink disc florets but no ray florets. The species grows in grasslands, meadows, and the edges of forests in mountainous areas.
