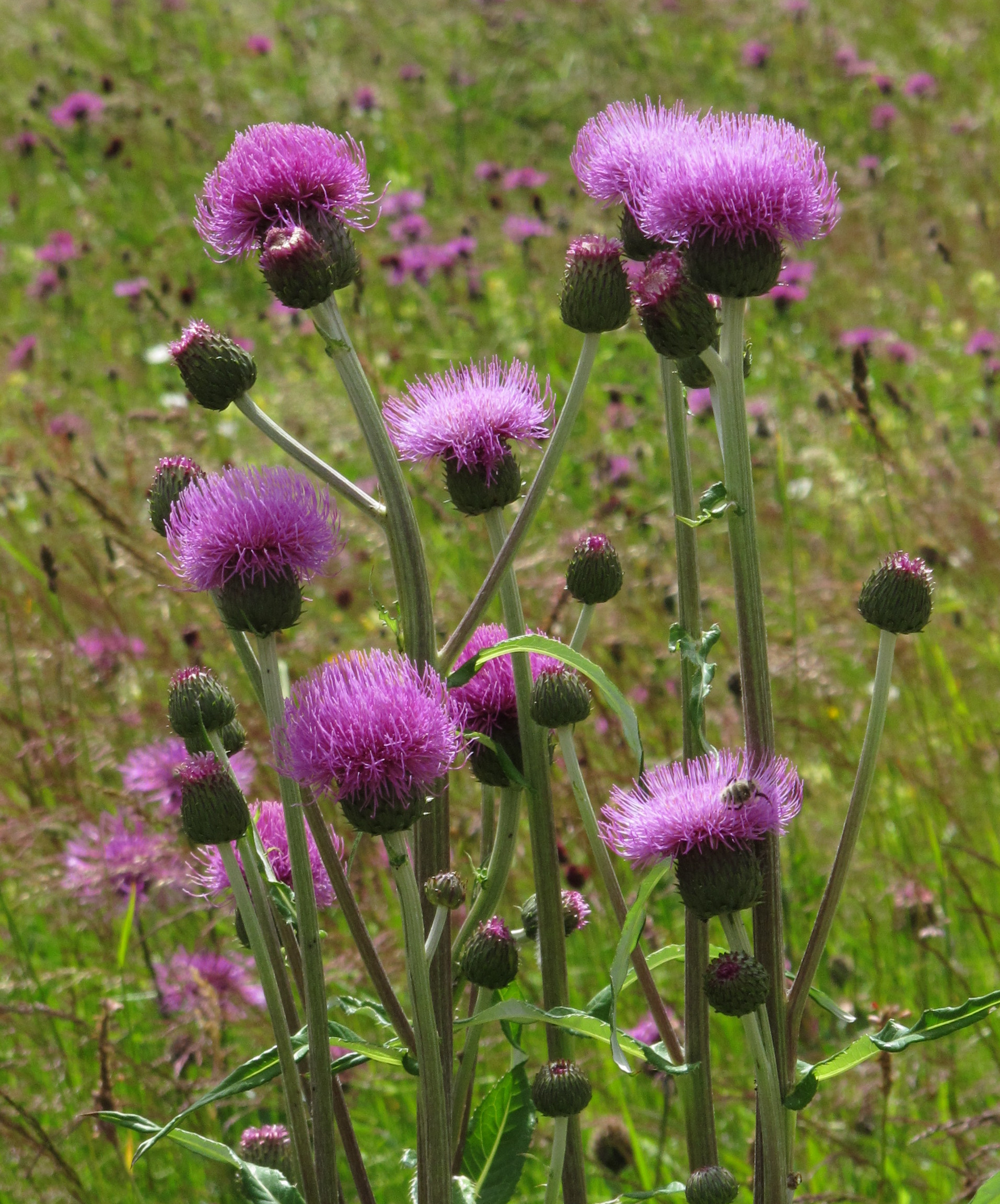
- Cirsium heterophyllum (melancholy thistle)

Scientific classification
- Kingdom: Plantae
- Clade: Embryophytes
- Clade: Tracheophytes
- Clade: Angiosperms
- Clade: Eudicots
- Clade: Asterids
- Order: Asterales
- Family: Asteraceae
- Subfamily: Carduoideae
- Tribe: Cardueae
- Subtribe: Carduinae
- Genus: Cirsium; Mill.

Species
- 383; see text

Synonyms
- Ancanthia Steud. (1840), not validly publ.; Ascalea Hill (1762); Breea Less. (1832); Cephalanophlos Neck. (1790), not validly publ.; Cephalonoplos (Neck. ex DC.) Fourr. (1869), nom. superfl.; Echenais Cass. (1818); Epitrachys (DC. ex Duby) K.Koch (1851); Eriolepis Cass. (1826); Erythrolaena Sweet (1825); Ixine Hill (1762); × Lophiocirsium Del Guacchio, Bureš, Iamonico & P.Caputo (2022); Lophiolepis Cass. (1823); Onopix Raf. (1817); Onotrophe Cass.; Spanioptilon Less. (1832); Tetralix Hill (1762), nom. illeg.; Xylanthema Neck. (1790)

= Cirsium =

Genus of flowering plants in the daisy family

Cirsium is a genus of perennial and biennial flowering plants in the Asteraceae, one of several genera known commonly as thistles. They are more precisely known as plume thistles. These differ from other thistle genera (Carduus, Silybum and Onopordum) in having a seed with a pappus of feathered hairs on their achenes. The other genera have a pappus of simple unbranched hairs.

They are mostly native to Eurasia and northern Africa, with about 60 species from North America (although several species have been introduced outside their native ranges). The lectotype species of the genus is Cirsium heterophyllum (L.) Hill.

Cirsium thistles are known for their effusive flower heads, usually purple, rose or pink, also yellow or white. The radially symmetrical disc flowers are at the end of the branches and are visited by many kinds of insects, featuring a generalised pollination syndrome. They have erect stems, with a characteristic enlarged base of the flower which is often spiny. The leaves are alternate, spiny in many (but not all) species, and in some species can be slightly to densely hairy. Extensions from the leaf base down the stem, called wings, can be lacking (Cirsium arvense), conspicuous (Cirsium vulgare), or inconspicuous. They can spread by seed, and also by rhizomes below the surface (Cirsium arvense). The seeds have a tuft of hair, or pappus, which can carry them far by wind.

Cirsium thistles are used as food plants by the larvae of some Lepidoptera species—see list of Lepidoptera that feed on Cirsium. The seeds are attractive to small finches such as American goldfinch.

Many species are considered weeds, typically by agricultural interests. Cirsium vulgare (spear thistle) is listed in the United States (where as a non-native invasive species it has been renamed "bull thistle") as a noxious weed in nine states. Some species in particular are cultivated in gardens and wildflower plantings for their aesthetic value and/or to support pollinators such as bees and butterflies. Some species dubbed weeds by various interest groups can also provide these benefits. Cirsium vulgare, for instance, ranked in the top 10 for nectar production in a UK plants survey conducted by the AgriLand project which is supported by the UK Insect Pollinators Initiative. Cirsium vulgare was also a top producer of nectar sugar in another study in Britain, ranked third with a production per floral unit of (2323 ± 418μg). Not only does it provide abundant nectar, it provides seeds for birds, such as the European goldfinch Carduelis carduelis, and supports the larvae of the Painted Lady butterfly Vanessa cardui. Some other common species are Cirsium arvense, Cirsium palustre, Cirsium oleraceum.

Some ecological organizations, such as the Xerces Society, have attempted to raise awareness of the benefits of thistles, to counteract the general agricultural and home garden labeling of thistles as unwanted weeds. The monarch butterfly (Danaus plexippus), for instance, was highlighted as relying upon thistles such as tall thistle (Cirsium altissimum) as nectar sources during its migration. Some prairie and wildflower seed production companies in the United States supply bulk seed of native North American thistle species for wildlife habitat restoration, although availability tends to be low. Thistles are particularly valued by bumblebees for their high nectar production.

Certain species of Cirsium, like Cirsium monspessulanum, Cirsium pyrenaicum and Cirsium vulgare, have been traditionally used as food in rural areas of southern Europe. Cirsium oleraceum is cultivated as a food source in Japan and India. Cirsium setidens is used as a vegetable in Korean cuisine.

'Cirsium' is the Greek word for thistle, kirsos, likely derived from 'swollen vein'. The flower blooms April to August.

== Selected species ==
493 species are accepted. Selected species include:

- Cirsium acaule – dwarf thistle
- Cirsium altissimum (L.) Spreng. – roadside thistle, tall thistle
- Cirsium andersonii Petr. – Anderson's thistle, rose thistle
- Cirsium andrewsii Jeps. – Franciscan thistle
- Cirsium arisanense Kitam.
- Cirsium arizonicum (A.Gray) Petr. – Arizona thistle
- Cirsium arvense (L.) Scop. – creeping thistle, field thistle
  - Cirsium arvense var.argenteum
  - Cirsium arvense var. integrifolium
  - Cirsium arvense var. mite
  - Cirsium arvense var. vestitum
- Cirsium barnebyi S.L.Welsh & Neese – Barneby's thistle
- Cirsium boninense Koidz.
- Cirsium brachycephalum Juratzka
- Cirsium brevifolium Nutt. – Palouse thistle
- Cirsium brevistylum Cronquist – clustered thistle
- Cirsium calcareum (M.E.Jones) Wooton & Standl. – Cainville thistle
- Cirsium canescens Nutt. – Platte thistle, prairie thistle
- Cirsium canum (L.) All. – Queen Anne's thistle
- Cirsium carolinianum (Walter) Fernald & B.G.Schub. – Carolina thistle, soft thistle
- Cirsium centaureae (Rydb.) K.Schum.
- Cirsium chellyense R.J.Moore & Frankton – queen thistle
- Cirsium ciliolatum (L.F.Hend.) J.T.Howell – ashland thistle
- Cirsium clavatum (M.E.Jones) Petr. – lake thistle
- Cirsium clokeyi S.F.Blake – Charleston Mountain thistle, whitespine thistle
- Cirsium congdonii R.J.Moore & Frankton – rosette thistle
- Cirsium crassicaule Jeps. – slough thistle
- Cirsium creticum (Lam.) d'Urv.
- Cirsium cymosum (Greene) J.T.Howell – peregrine thistle
- Cirsium discolor (Muhl. ex Willd.) Spreng. – field thistle, pasture thistle
- Cirsium dissectum (L.) Hill – meadow thistle (syn. Cirsium lanceolatum Hill non (L.) Scop.)
- Cirsium douglasii DC.
- Cirsium drummondii Torr. & A.Gray – dwarf thistle
- Cirsium durangense (Greenm.) G.B.Ownbey
- Cirsium eatonii (A.Gray) B.L.Rob. – Eaton's thistle
- Cirsium edule Nutt. – edible thistle
- Cirsium engelmannii Rydb. – Engelmann thistle, Engelmann's thistle
- Cirsium erisithales (Jacq.) Scop. – yellow melancholy thistle
- Cirsium esculentum (Siev.) C.A.Mey.
- Cirsium flodmanii Arthur – Flodman thistle, Flodman's thistle
- Cirsium foliosum DC. – Drummond's thistle, elk thistle, leafy thistle, meadow thistle
- Cirsium fontinale Jeps. – fountain thistle
- Cirsium funkiae Ackerf. – funky thistle
- Cirsium grahamii A.Gray – Graham's thistle
- Cirsium griseum (Rydb.) K.Schum. – gray thistle
- Cirsium helenioides (L.) Hill
- Cirsium heterophyllum (L.) Hill – melancholy thistle
- Cirsium hookerianum Nutt. – white thistle
- Cirsium horridulum Michx. – yellow thistle
- Cirsium hydrophilum Boiss. – Suisun thistle
- Cirsium hypoleucum DC.
- Cirsium italicum DC.
- Cirsium jaliscoense G.L.Nesom
- Cirsium japonicum DC. – Japanese thistle
- Cirsium kamtschaticum Ledeb. ex DC. – Kamchatka thistle
- Cirsium lecontei Torr. & A.Gray – Le Conte's thistle
- Cirsium leo Nakai & Kitag.
- Cirsium libanoticum DC.
- Cirsium loncholepis Petr. – LaGraciosa thistle
- Cirsium longistylum R.J.Moore & Frankton – longstyle thistle
- Cirsium maritimum Makino
- Cirsium mexicanum DC. – Mexican thistle
- Cirsium mohavense (Greene) Petr. – Mojave thistle
- Cirsium muticum Michx. – swamp thistle
- Cirsium neomexicanum A.Gray – lavender thistle, New Mexico thistle, powderpuff thistle
- Cirsium nipponicum Makino
- Cirsium nuttallii DC. – Nuttall's thistle
- Cirsium occidentale (Nutt.) Jeps. – cobweb thistle
- Cirsium ochrocentrum A.Gray – yellowspine thistle
- Cirsium oleraceum (L.) Scop. – cabbage thistle
- Cirsium ownbeyi S.L.Welsh – Ownbey's thistle
- Cirsium palustre (L.) Scop. – marsh thistle
- Cirsium parryi Petr. – Parry's thistle or Cloudcroft thistle
- Cirsium peckii L.F.Hend. – Steens Mountain thistle
- Cirsium pendulum Fisch. ex DC.
- Cirsium perplexans Petr. – Rocky Mountain thistle
- Cirsium pitcheri Torr. & A.Gray – Pitcher's thistle, sand dune thistle
- Cirsium praeteriens J.F.Macbr. – Palo Alto thistle, lost thistle
- Cirsium pulcherrimum (Rydb.) K.Schum. – Wyoming thistle
- Cirsium pumilum Spreng. – pasture thistle
  - Cirsium pumilum var. hillii (Canby) B.Boivin – Hill's thistle
  - Cirsium pumilum var. pumilum
- Cirsium pyrenaicum (Jacq.) All.
- Cirsium quercetorum (A.Gray) Jeps. – Alameda County thistle
- Cirsium remotifolium DC. – fewleaf thistle
  - Cirsium remotifolium var. odontolepis Petr.
  - Cirsium remotifolium var. remotifolium – fewleaf thistle
  - Cirsium remotifolium var. rivulare Jeps.
- Cirsium repandum Michx. – sandhill thistle
- Cirsium rhaphilepis Petr.
- Cirsium rhinoceros Nakai – Korean prickly thistle
- Cirsium rhothophilum S.F.Blake – surf thistle
- Cirsium rivulare (Jacq.) All. – brook thistle
- Cirsium rydbergii Petr. – Rydberg's thistle
- Cirsium scapanolepis Petr. – mountain slope thistle
- Cirsium scariosum Nutt. – meadow thistle
- Cirsium scopulorum (Greene) Cockerell – mountain thistle
- Cirsium setidens (Dunn) Nakai – gondre or Korean thistle
- Cirsium spinosissimum (L.) Scop.
- Cirsium texanum Buckley – Texas thistle
- Cirsium tioganum (Congdon) Petr. – stemless thistle
- †Cirsium toyoshimae Koidz.
- Cirsium tuberosum (L.) All. – tuberous thistle
- Cirsium turneri Warnock – cliff thistle
- Cirsium undulatum (Nutt.) Spreng. – gray thistle, wavy-leaf thistle, wavyleaf thistle
  - Cirsium undulatum var. tracyi – Tracy's thistle, wavyleaf thistle
  - Cirsium undulatum var. undulatum – wavyleaf thistle
- Cirsium vinaceum Wooton & Standl. – Sacramento Mountain thistle, Sacramento Mountains thistle
- Cirsium virginianum Michx. – Virginia thistle
- Cirsium vulgare (Savi) Ten. – spear thistle, common thistle (syn. Cirsium lanceolatum (L.) Scop.)
- Cirsium wheeleri (A.Gray) Petr. – Wheeler's thistle
- Cirsium wrightii A.Gray – Wright's thistle

Hybrids

- Cirsium × canalense – canal thistle
- Cirsium × crassum – thistle
- Cirsium × erosum – glory thistle
- Cirsium × iowense – Iowa thistle
- Cirsium × vancouverense – Vancouver thistle

=== Formerly placed here ===
- Afrocirsium buchwaldii (O.Hoffm.) Calleja, N.Garcia, Moreyra & Susanna (as Cirsium buchwaldii O.Hoffm.)
- Afrocirsium schimperi (Vatke) Calleja, N.Garcia, Moreyra & Susanna (as Cirsium schimperi (Vatke) C.Jeffrey)
- Afrocirsium straminispinum (C.Jeffrey) Calleja, N.Garcia, Moreyra & Susanna (Cirsium straminispinum C.Jeffrey)
- Lophiolepis eriophora (L.) Del Guacchio, Bureš, Iamonico & P.Caputo (as Cirsium eriophorum (L.) Scop.) – woolly thistle
- Nuriaea dender (Friis) Susanna, Calleja & Moreyra (as Cirsium dender Friis)
- Nuriaea engleriana (O.Hoffm.) Susanna, Calleja & Moreyra (as Cirsium englerianum O.Hoffm.)
- Picnomon acarna (L.) Cass. (as Cirsium acarna (L.) Moench) – soldier thistle

== Image gallery ==
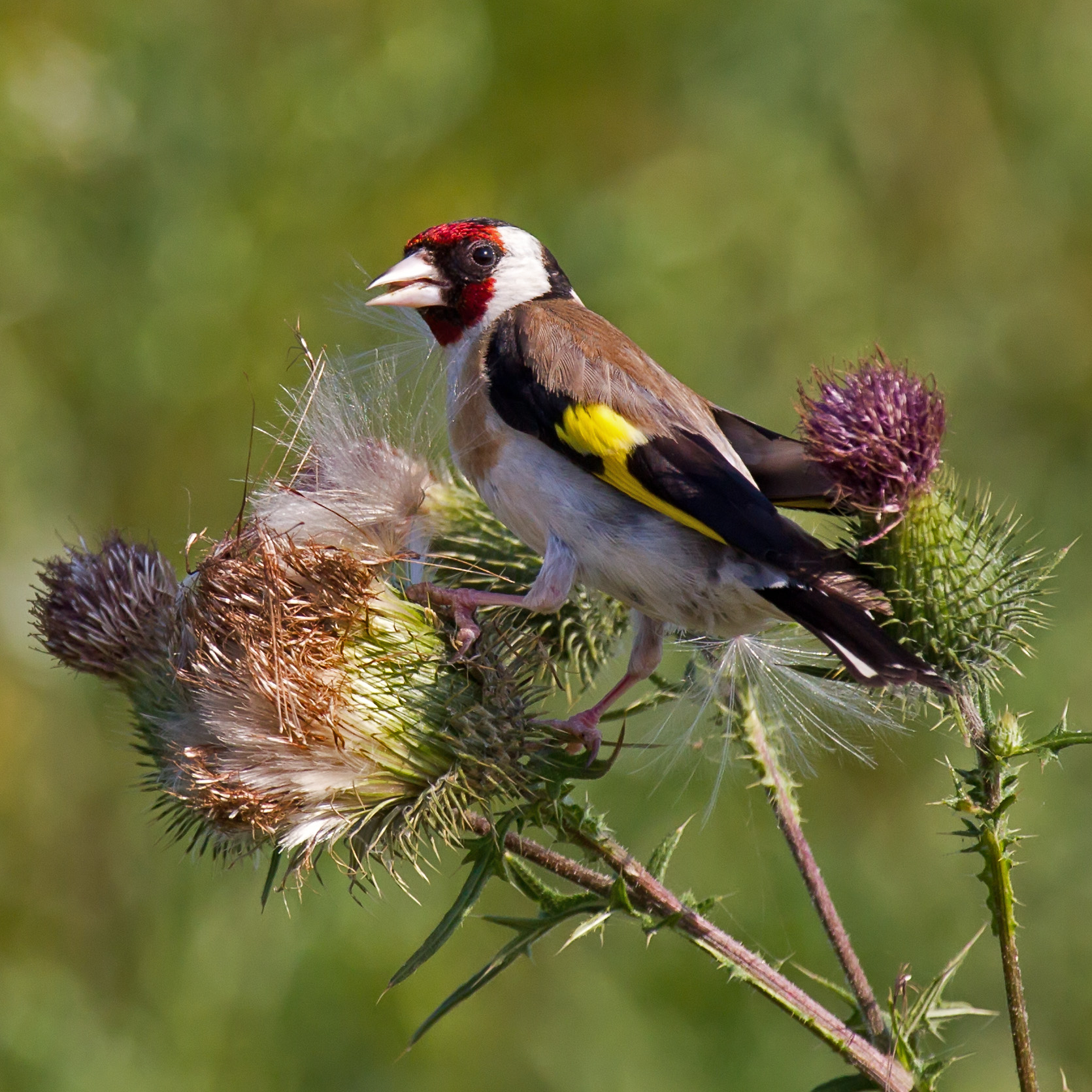
A European goldfinch eating seeds on a Cirsium vulgare (spear thistle) seedhead

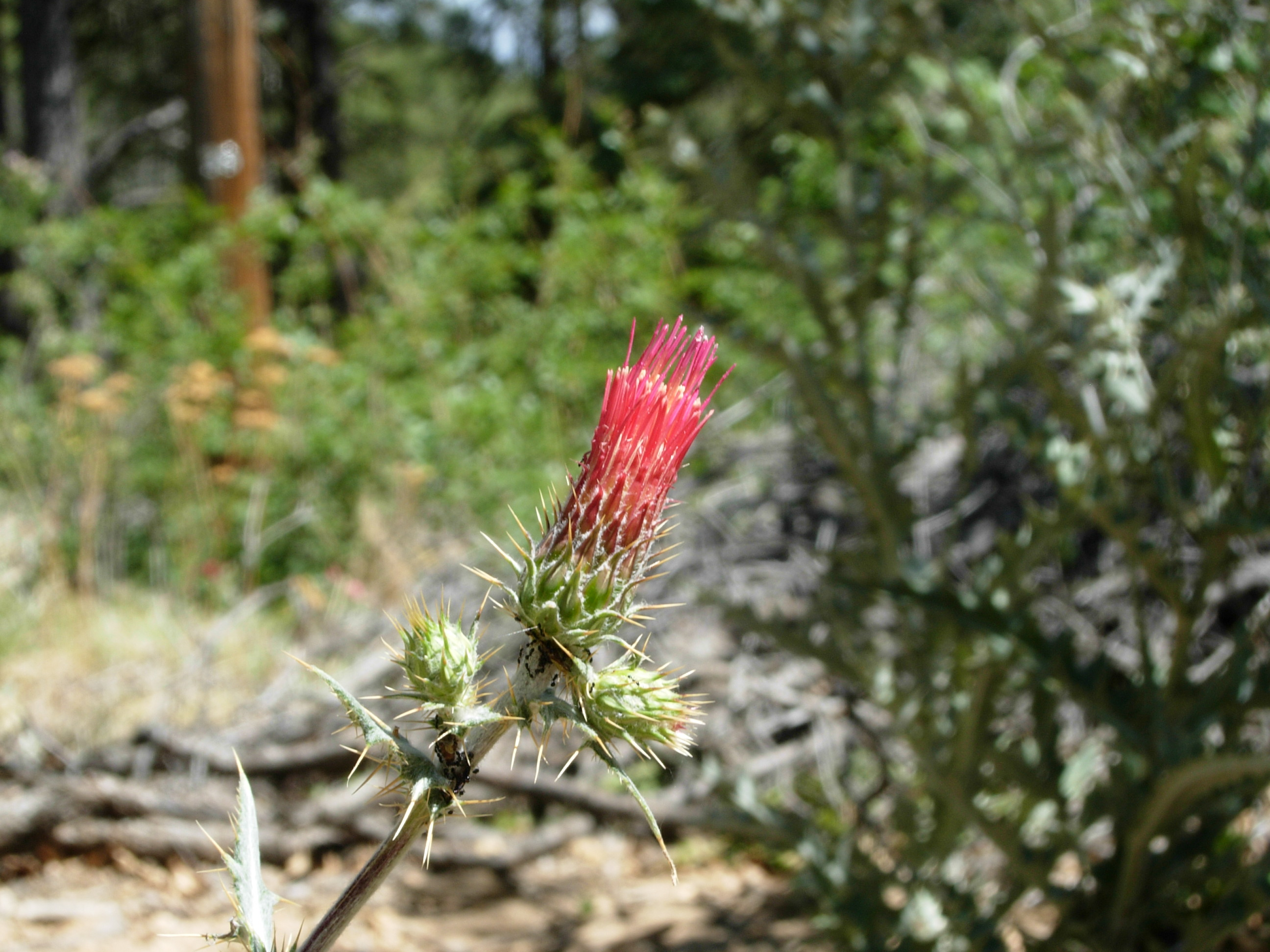
Cirsium arizonicum (Arizona thistle)

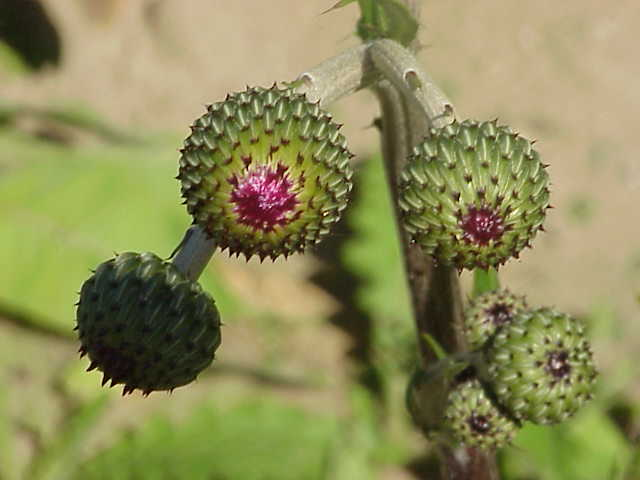
Cirsium canum (Queen Anne's thistle)

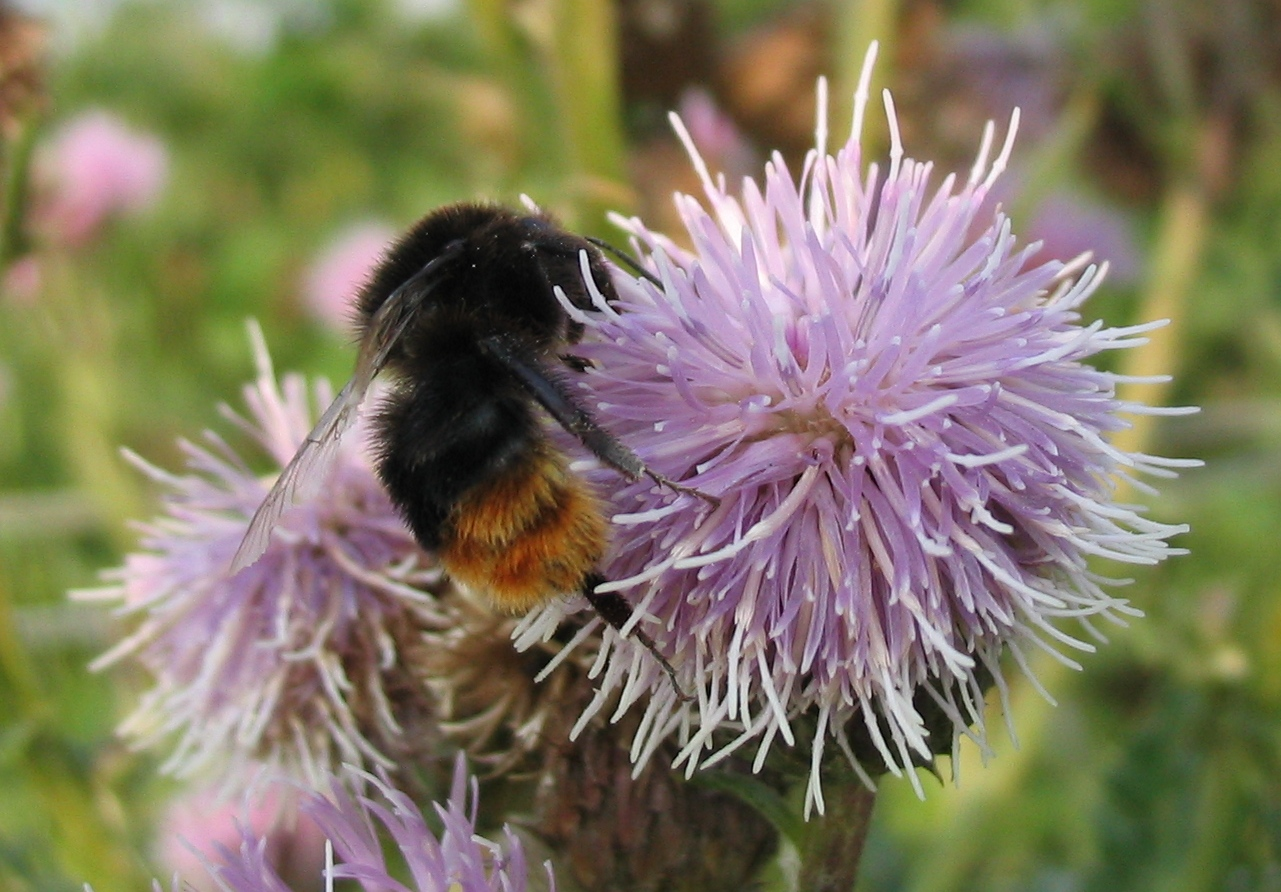
Bumblebee on a Cirsium arvense (creeping thistle) flowerhead

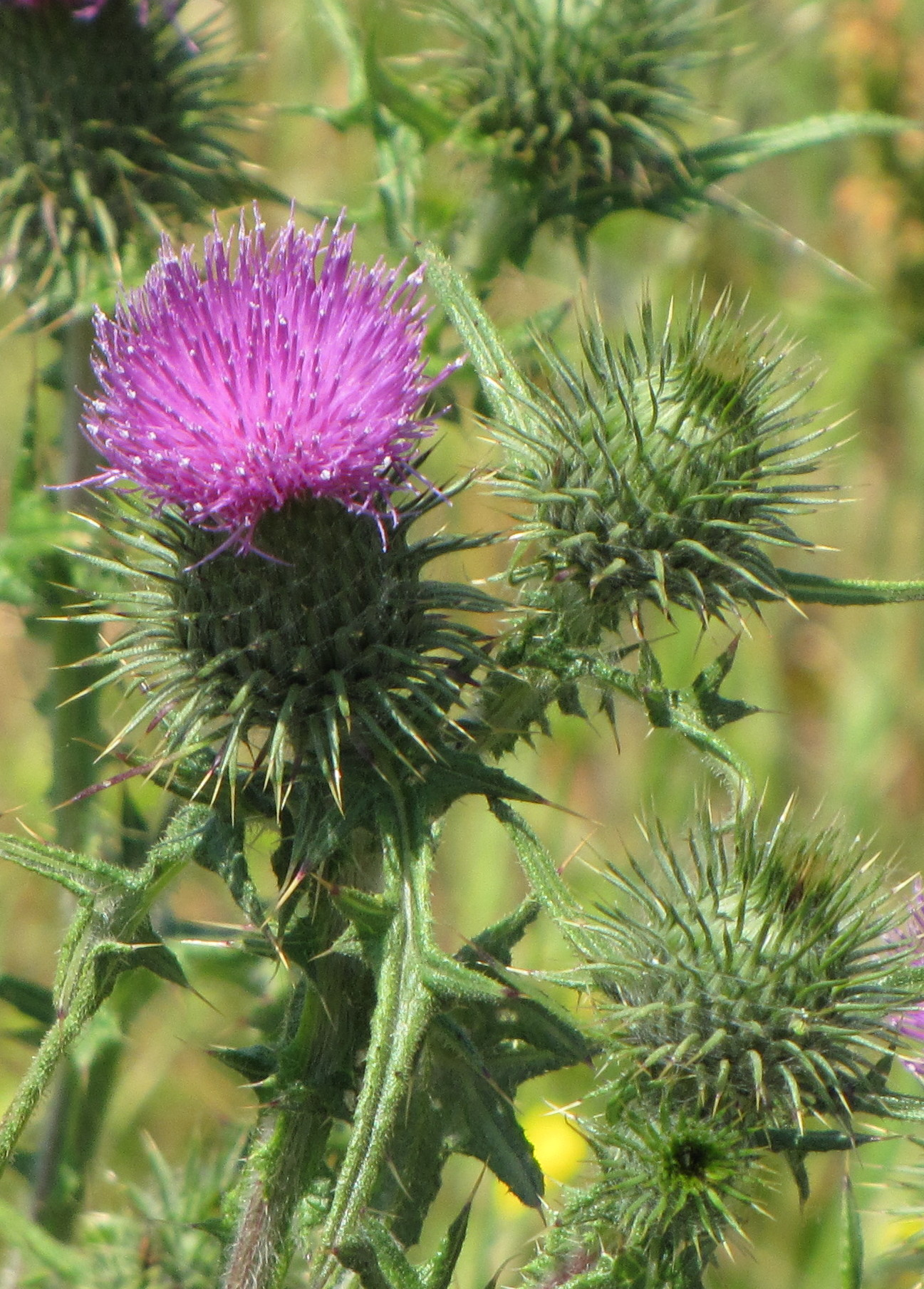
Cirsium vulgare (spear thistle)

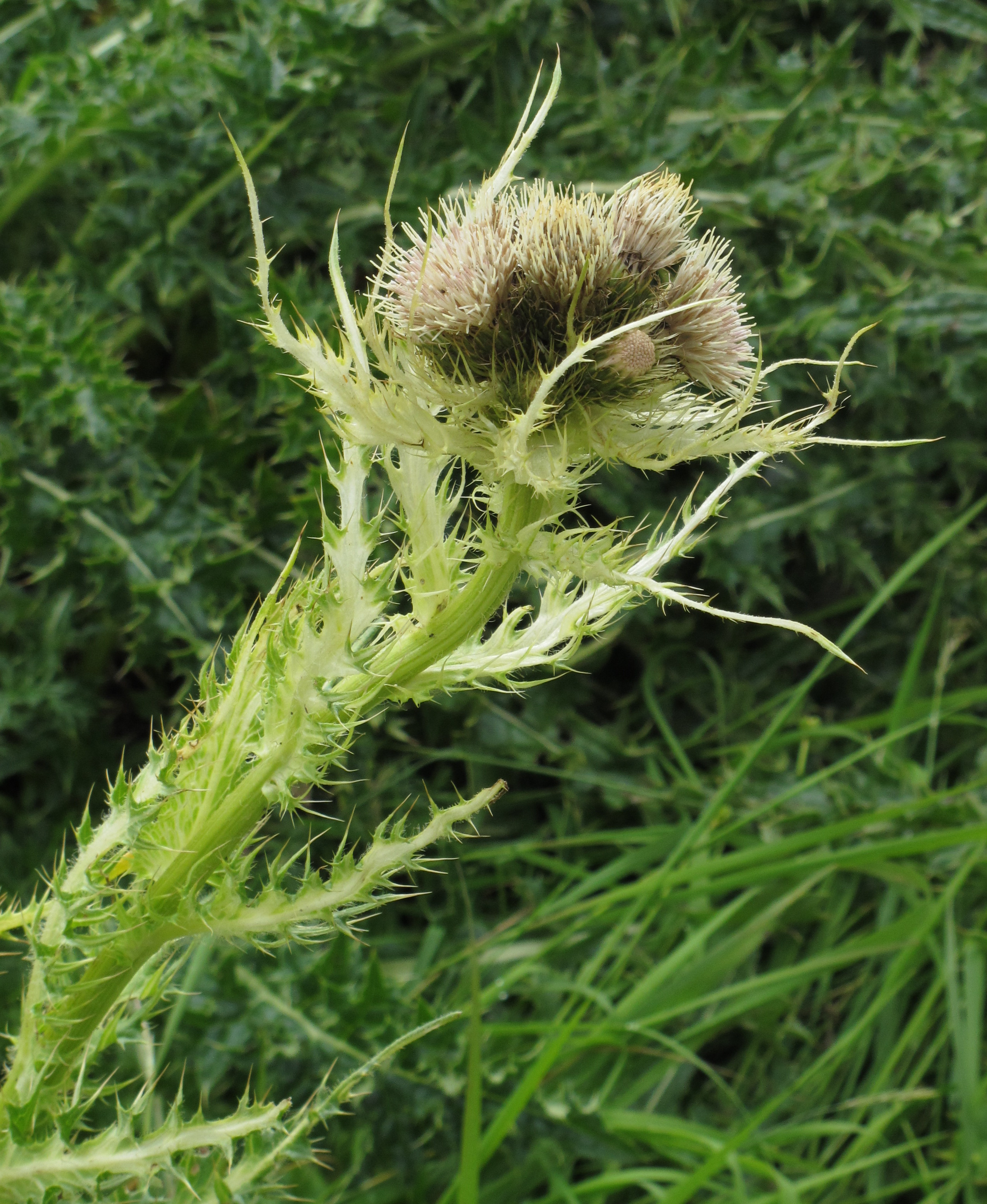
Cirsium spinosissimum (spiniest thistle)

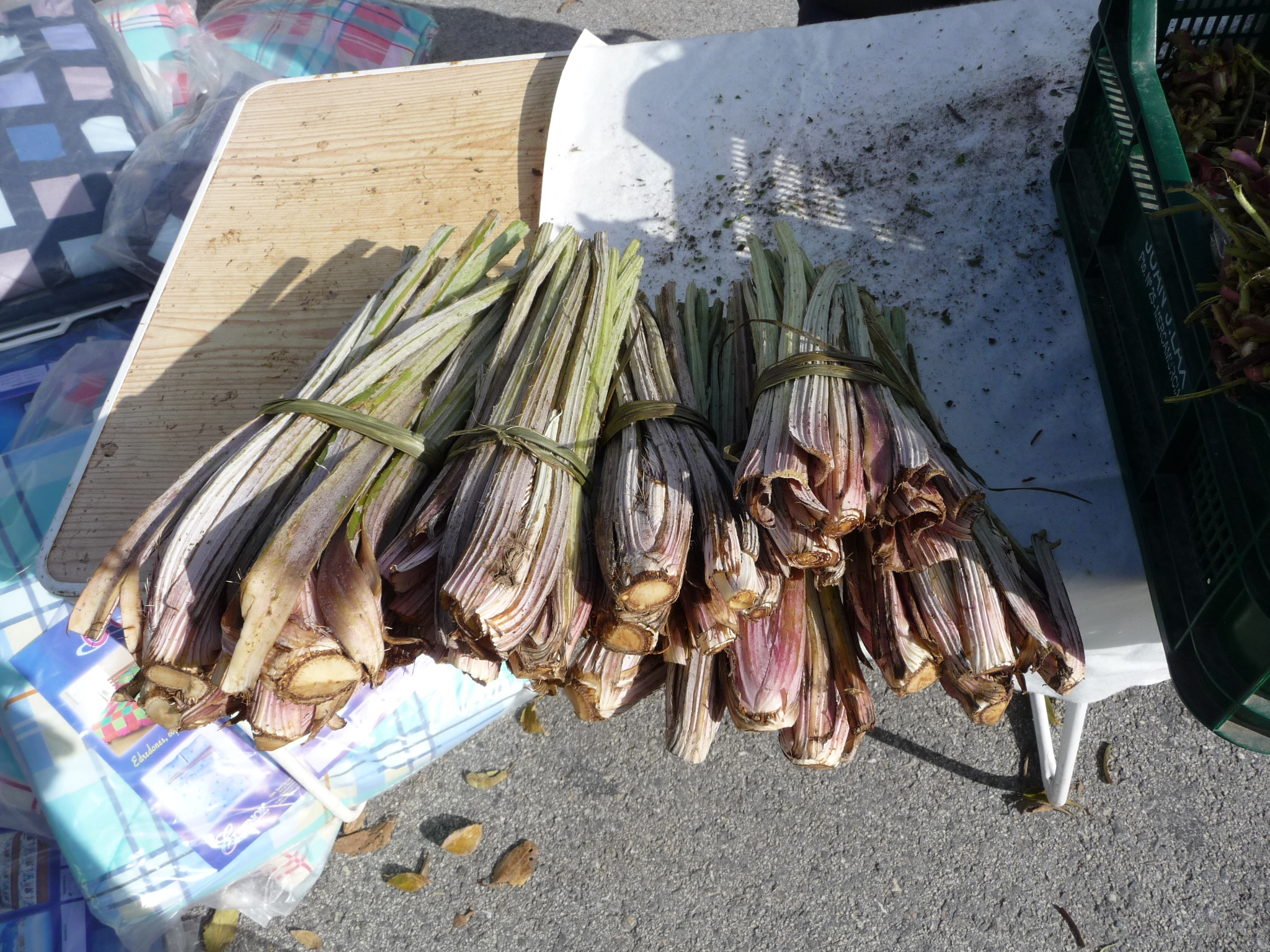
Cirsium pyrenaicum cut and ready to cook

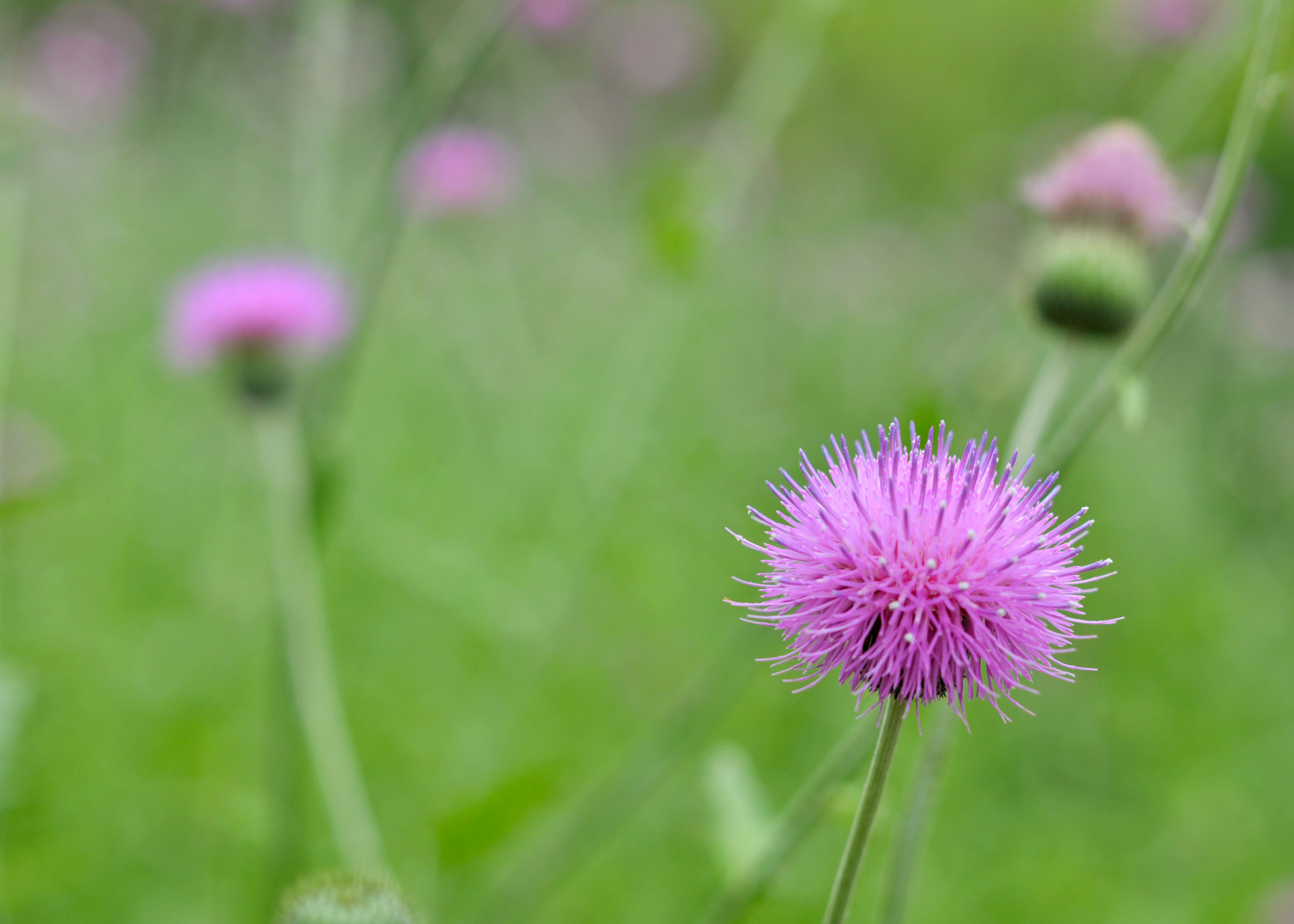
Texas purple thistle
