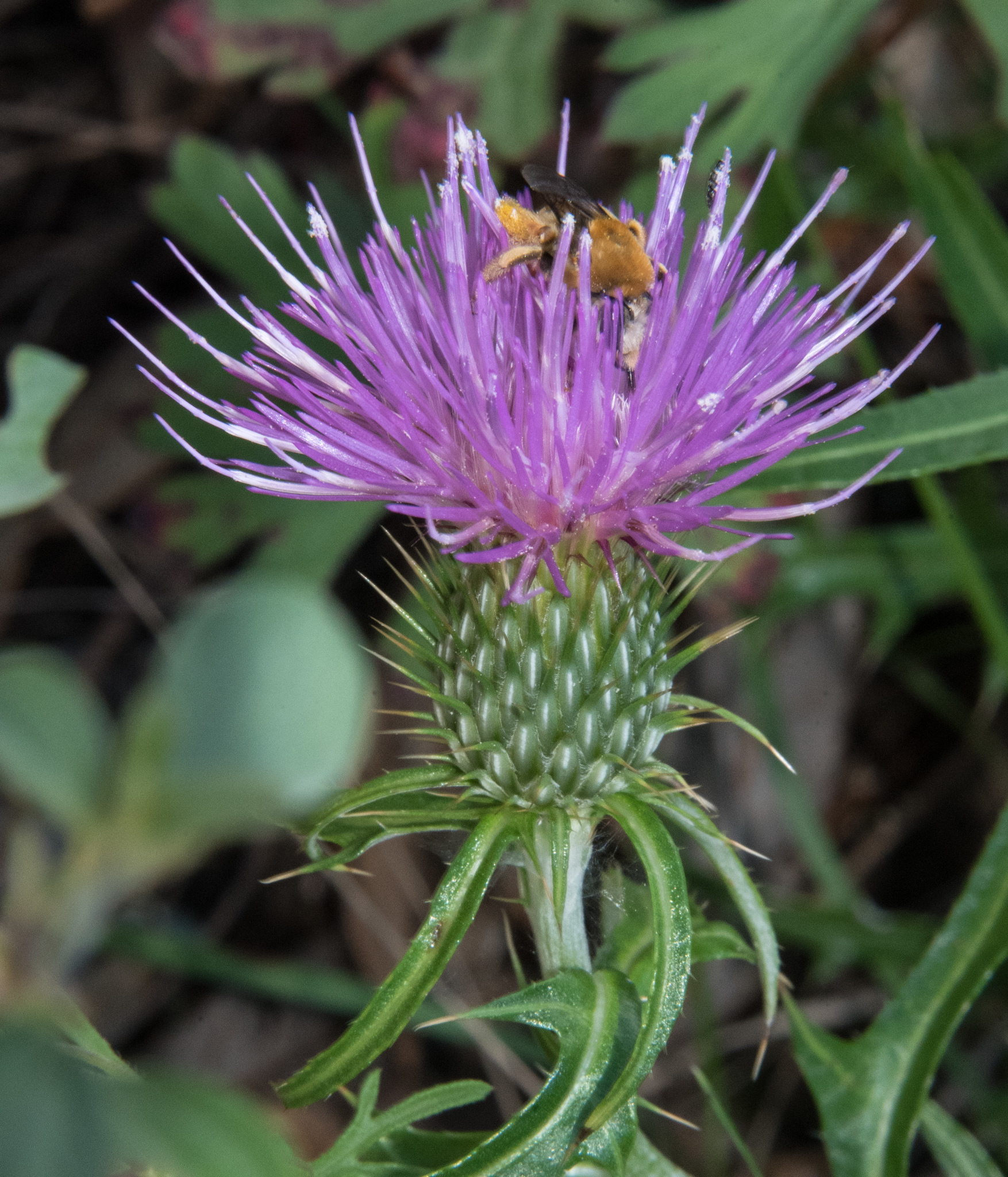

Scientific classification
- Kingdom: Plantae
- Clade: Embryophytes
- Clade: Tracheophytes
- Clade: Angiosperms
- Clade: Eudicots
- Clade: Asterids
- Order: Asterales
- Family: Asteraceae
- Genus: Cirsium
- Species: C. grahamii

Binomial name
- Cirsium grahamii A.Gray

Synonyms
- Carduus grahamii (A.Gray) Greene; Cnicus grahamii A.Gray

= Cirsium grahamii =

Species of thistle

Cirsium grahamii, called Graham's thistle, is a North American species of plants in the tribe Cardueae within the family Asteraceae. The species is native to Sonora, Chihuahua, Durango, Nuevo León, New Mexico, and Arizona.

Cirsium grahamii is a biennial herb up to 100 cm (40 inches) tall, blooming only once before dying. Leaves have thin spines along the edges. There is several flower heads per plant, with deep purple disc florets but no ray florets.
