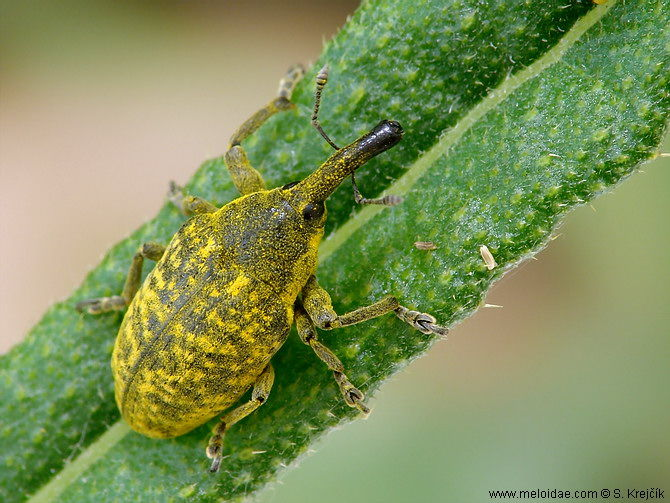
- Adult of Larinus sturnus

Scientific classification
- Kingdom: Animalia
- Phylum: Arthropoda
- Clade: Pancrustacea
- Class: Insecta
- Order: Coleoptera
- Suborder: Polyphaga
- Infraorder: Cucujiformia
- Superfamily: Curculionoidea
- Family: Curculionidae
- Genus: Larinus
- Species: L. sturnus

Binomial name
- Larinus sturnus Schaller, 1783

Synonyms
- Larinus conspersus Boheman, 1843; Larinus fringilla Gyllenhal, 1827; Larinus hispanicus Petri, 1907 non Motschulsky, 1849; Larinus lucidirostris Penecke, 1936; Larinus proboscideus Petri, 1907; Larinus rugithorax Desbrochers, 1897; Larinus stellaris Gyllenhal, 1835; Larinus striatopunctatus Petri, 1907

= Larinus sturnus =

Species of cylindrical weevil

Larinus sturnus is a species of cylindrical weevils belonging to the family Curculionidae, subfamily Lixinae.

== Description ==
Larinus sturnus can reach a body length of about 8–13 mm (0.31–0.51 in). These rather small weevils have a black, oval shaped, punctuated body, densely covered with yellow dust, with several yellowish patches of gray setae, that appear yellowish by a yellowish secretion and adhering pollen. The pronotum is one and a half times wider than long. Its oval shaped elytra are wider than the pronotum. In front of the scutellum, there is a slight but noticeable indentation. They show the characteristic rostrum of the weevil family. It is thick, long and curved, shorter in males, relatively longer in females. Its antennae are short with conspicuous clubs. This species is rather similar and often confused with other representatives of its genus, such as Larinus planus, Larinus jaceae and Larinus turbinatus. However, these beetles are usually larger than the similar species.

== Distribution ==
This species is widespread in central and southern Europe (Albania, Austria, Bulgaria, Croatia, the Czech Republic, France, Germany, Greece, Hungary, Italy, Poland, Romania, Serbia, Slovakia, Slovenia, Spain and Switzerland). It is only missing in the British Isles and in northern Scandinavia. It is also represented in the Mediterranean region including North Africa (Algeria and Morocco), the Near and Middle East (Iran) and Central Asia (Turkestan). The species also extends to southern Siberia and Central Asia.

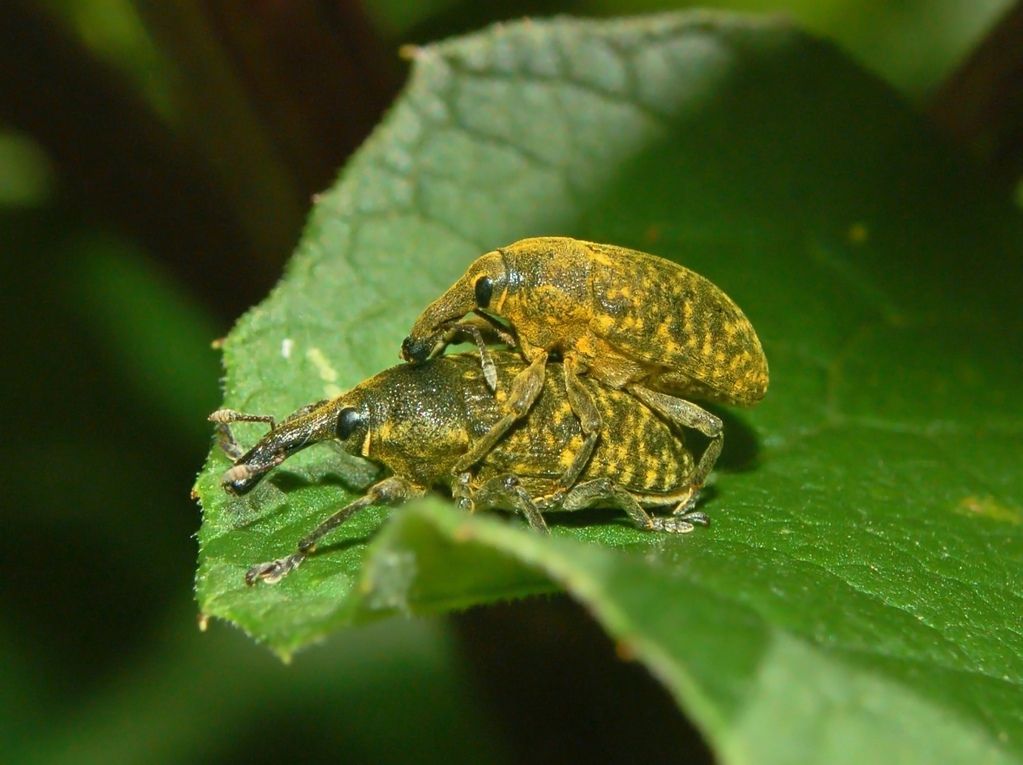
Mating couple

== Habitat ==
These weevils occur in meadows, pastures, roadsides, edges of forests and shrubs, clearings and dry slopes.

== Biology ==
The females of Larinus sturnus lay one egg into one flower bud. The larvae develop in the flower heads of various composites (Asteraceae), especially in thistles (Cirsium). They feed on the seeds and the tissues of the flower. Adults can be found from May to September. They mostly occur on Arctium lappa, Arctium tomentosum, Carduus nutans, Cirsium lanceolatum, Cirsium heterophyllum, Cirsium oleraceum, Cirsium palustre, Centaurea jacea, Centaurea scabiosa, Silybum marianum and Carlina acaulis, They feed on plant sap.
