= Cirsium ciliolatum =

Conservation status
- Vulnerable (NatureServe)

Scientific classification
- Kingdom: Plantae
- Clade: Embryophytes
- Clade: Tracheophytes
- Clade: Spermatophytes
- Clade: Angiosperms
- Clade: Eudicots
- Clade: Asterids
- Order: Asterales
- Family: Asteraceae
- Genus: Cirsium
- Species: C. ciliolatum

Binomial name
- Cirsium ciliolatum (L.F.Hend.) J.T.Howell

Synonyms
- Synonyms (4): Cirsium undulatum var. ciliolatum L.F.Hend.; Carduus ciliolatus (L.F.Hend.) A.Heller; Cirsium breweri subsp. howellii (Petr.) Petr.; Cirsium howellii Petr.

Species of thistle

Cirsium ciliolatum is a species of thistle in the family Asteraceae known by the common name Ashland thistle. It is endemic to the Klamath Mountains, where it is known from only thirty occurrences in Jackson County, Oregon and Siskiyou County, California. It is closely related to Cirsium undulatum and has sometimes been treated as a variety of that species, but it is distinguished by its noticeably fringed bracts. Because of its rarity and due to threats from agriculture and development, the species is vulnerable globally and listed as endangered in California.

== Description ==
Cirsium ciliolatum is a perennial herb growing from a rootstock branching with runner roots. Plants grow 60–200 cm tall and have one main stem, sometimes with a few branches. The vegetative parts of the plant are covered in cobwebby or woolly fibers. The basal leaves, which are typically still present when the plant flowers, are 10–30 cm long and 3–12 cm wide, with margins that range from smooth to toothed or deeply lobed and bear spines 1–6 mm long. Cauline leaves are distributed along the stem, gradually reduced in size toward the top of the plant. The lower leaf faces are covered with white, woolly hairs, and the upper faces are greener, with cobwebby white hairs.

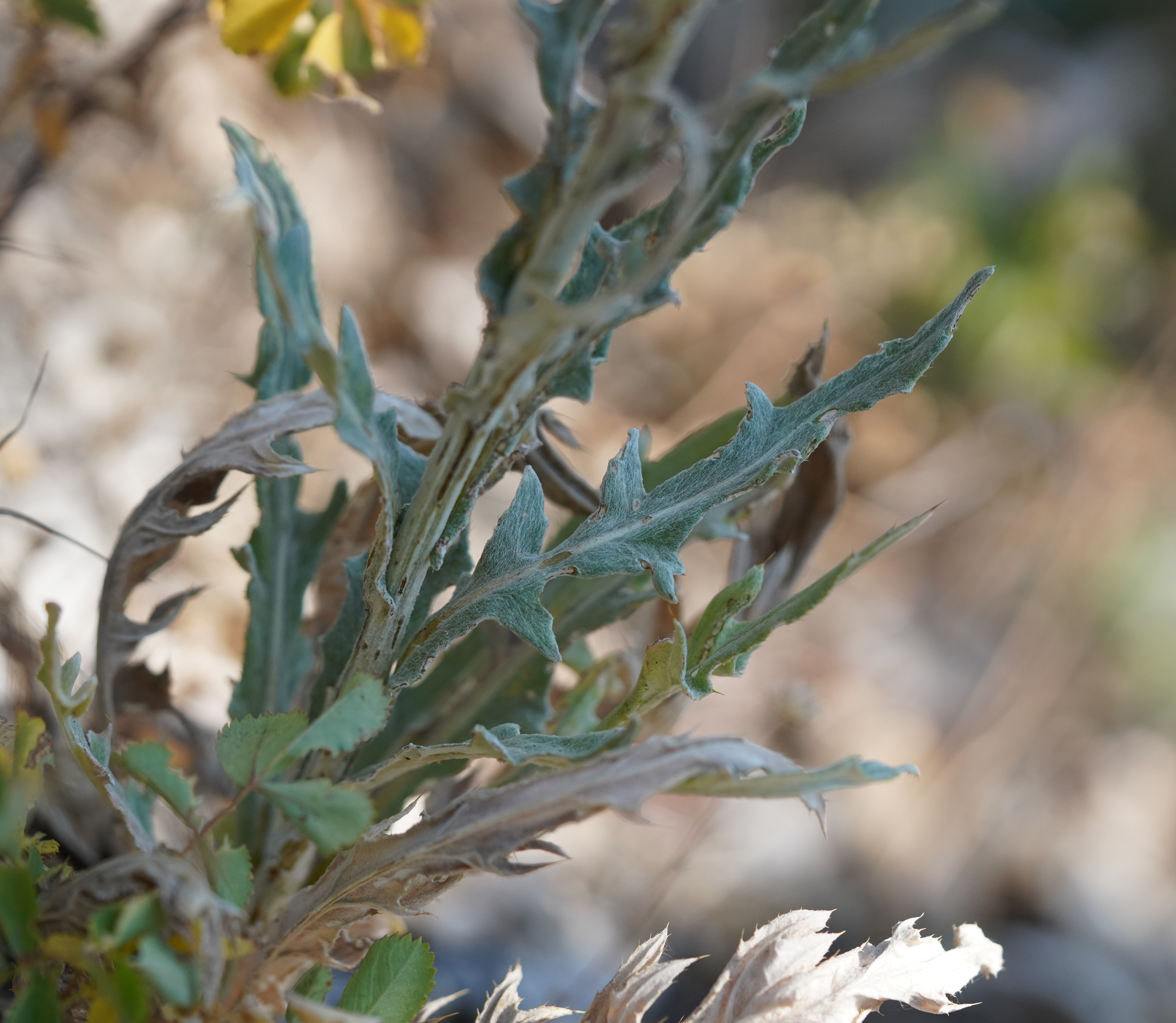
Cirsium ciliolatum leaves

Plants flower from May to August, although there is a narrower flowering period in California from June to July. The inflorescence is a cluster of a few (or often only one) flower heads borne on peduncles 0–15 cm long at the end of the main stem and its branches. Each flower is subtended by an ovoid or hemispheric cluster of phyllaries called an involucre, 1.5–2.3 cm long and 1.5–3 cm wide, sometimes with thin, cobwebby hairs. The phyllaries are arranged in 5–7 overlapping series and point upward or spread somewhat outward. Each phyllary is 1–3 mm long, narrow, green with a sticky central ridge, and covered in fine spines. The flower head is 1.5–2.5 cm long and composite, consisting of many tightly-packed tubelike flowers, dull white to lavender in color.

The fruit is a brown achene with a thick body a few millimeters long and a pappus about 1.5 cm in length.

== Taxonomy ==
Louis F. Henderson first described this plant as Cirsium undulatum var. ciliolatum in 1900, designating a plant he collected near Ashland, Oregon in July, 1886 as its type specimen. Henderson differentiated the variety from typical C. undulatum based on the fringe of small hairs along the bracts, although he noted that C. undulatum var. undulatum also generally has small hairs along some of its bracts.

Amos Heller recombined the taxon as Carduus ciliolatum in 1900, elevating it to species level and transferring it to the genus Carduus with several other species of thistle. Overlooking the fact that Henderson had already named the plant, Franz Petrak named the plant Cirsium breweri subsp. howellii in 1914 and Cirsium howellii in 1917, identifying an 1887 collection from the Rogue River Valley by Thomas J. Howell as the type. The botanist John Thomas Howell identified Petrak's names as heterotypic synonyms of Cirsium undulatum var. ciliolatum and Carduus ciliolatum, which he recombined as Cirsium ciliolatum in 1959.

Modern taxonomic authorities, including Plants of the World Online, Flora of North America, the Oregon Flora Project, and The Jepson Manual, recognize Cirsium ciliolatum as a distinct species. However, as Henderson first noted in 1900, it is closely related to C. undulatum, of which it may merit being treated as a variety.

== Distribution ==
Cirsium ciliolatum is a narrow endemic, meaning that it grows only within a small geographic range. All known populations are in the Klamath Mountains in Jackson County, Oregon and neighboring Siskiyou County, California. Of the thirty known populations, twenty-five are on public land in Oregon, including in the Rogue River–Siskiyou National Forest. In California, there are five known populations, all presumed to be extant and all of which are on privately owned land.

Typical habitats include open areas within grassy slopes and oak woodlands on thin, rocky soil. Its elevational range is 500–1400 m.

== Conservation ==
Globally, NatureServe lists Cirsium ciliolatum as a vulnerable species due to its rarity and a presumed decline in populations over the past 150 years. In California, where the only known populations occur on private land, the plant is considered critically imperiled. The primary threats to the conservation of this species include road building and agriculture, including grazing and the use of biocides; invasive species may also pose a threat.
