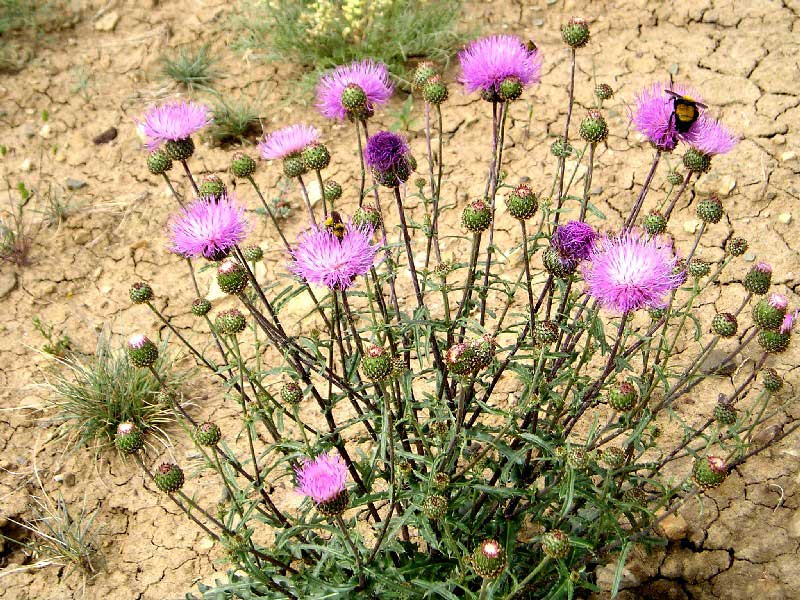

Conservation status
- Vulnerable (NatureServe)

Scientific classification
- Kingdom: Plantae
- Clade: Embryophytes
- Clade: Tracheophytes
- Clade: Angiosperms
- Clade: Eudicots
- Clade: Asterids
- Order: Asterales
- Family: Asteraceae
- Genus: Cirsium
- Species: C. perplexans

Binomial name
- Cirsium perplexans (Rydb.) Petr.

= Cirsium perplexans =

Species of thistle

Cirsium perplexans is a species of flowering plant in the family Asteraceae known by the common names Rocky Mountain thistle and Adobe Hills thistle. It is endemic to Colorado in the United States, where it occurs in the Colorado and Gunnison River Valleys in the Rocky Mountains.

This species is a biennial herb growing up to one meter tall from a taproot. The stems are coated thinly in webby fibers. The leaves are up to 30 centimeters long by 6 wide. They are sometimes unlobed but have toothed margins. The leaves have woolly fibers, especially on the undersides. The flower heads contain long lavender or purplish florets. The fruit is an achene which may exceed 2 centimeters in length including its pappus.

This species is found in western Colorado, usually on open outcrops of clay-based soils called "adobe hills". Habitat types include pinyon-juniper woodland, sagebrush, saltbrush, and shrublands. Dominant plant species include Pinus edulis (pinyon pine), Juniperus osteosperma (Utah juniper), Artemisia tridentata (big sagebrush), Artemisia tridentata ssp. wyomingensis (Wyoming sagebrush), Atriplex confertifolia (saltbush), Amelanchier utahensis (Utah serviceberry), and Quercus gambelii (Gambel's oak). The thistle grows in open areas that are sparsely vegetated. It can tolerate some disturbance and may occur on roadsides.

The main threat to this species is probably biological pest control agents released to control non-native thistle species. For example, the weevil Rhinocyllus conicus was released to control musk thistle, Carduus nutans, but once in the wild it also attacked many native species, including native thistles such as C. perplexans. The weevil Larinus planus has been released near the habitat of C. perplexans for the biological control of Cirsium arvense. It is not yet known if this weevil will attack C. perplexans. In addition, herbicides used to control invasive thistles may harm native species.

Other threats include excessive disturbance of the habitat. The thistle can tolerate some disturbance but off-road vehicle use can cause extensive degradation of the habitat. Road traffic may also be destructive. Introduced species of plants may be a threat, including Bromus inermis (smooth brome) and Melilotus officinalis (yellow sweet clover).
