= Zeuxia cinerea =

Scientific classification
- Kingdom: Animalia
- Phylum: Arthropoda
- Class: Insecta
- Order: Diptera
- Family: Tachinidae
- Subfamily: Dexiinae
- Tribe: Dexiini
- Genus: Zeuxia
- Species: Z. cinerea

Binomial name
- Zeuxia cinerea Meigen, 1826

Synonyms
- Dexia distans Wiedemann, 1830; Ptilocera palpalis Robineau-Desvoidy, 1830; Zeuxia latifrons Portschinsky, 1881; Zeuxia nigripalpis Kolomiets, 1971

Species of fly

Zeuxia cinerea is a species of fly in the family Tachinidae. It is a parasitoid of beetle larvae of the Curculionidae family, including Larinus sibiricus, Rhinocyllus conicus, Temnorhinus hololeucus, and Maximus strabus.

== Distribution ==
Czech Republic, Hungary, Moldova, Poland, Romania, Slovakia, Ukraine, Albania, Bosnia and Herzegovina, Bulgaria, Croatia, Greece, Italy, Macedonia, Portugal, Serbia, Spain, Turkey, Austria, France, Germany, Switzerland, Kazakhstan, Iran, Israel, Palestine, Algeria, Russia, Armenia.
