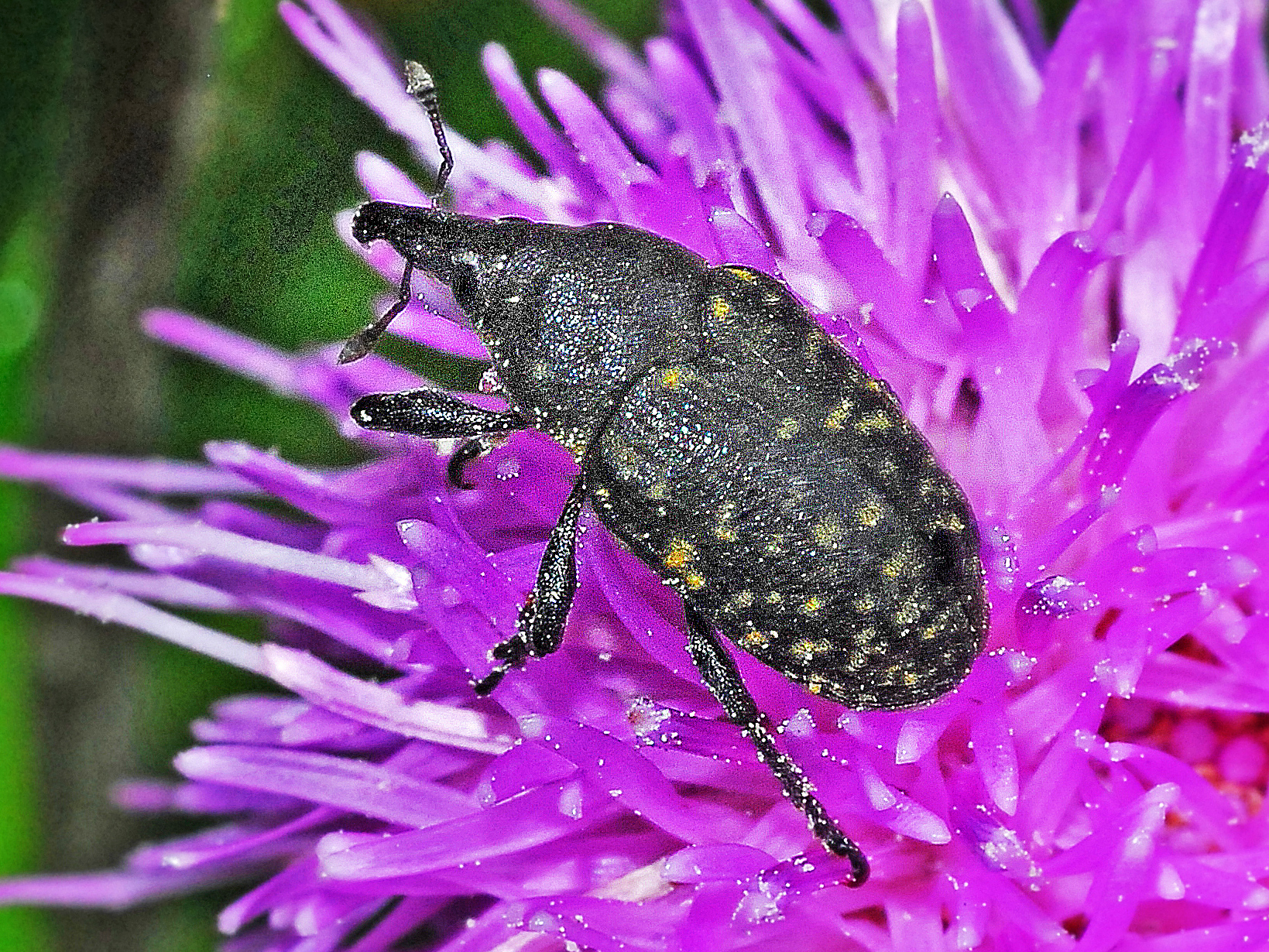
- Larinus turbinatus on thistle flower

Scientific classification
- Kingdom: Animalia
- Phylum: Arthropoda
- Clade: Pancrustacea
- Class: Insecta
- Order: Coleoptera
- Suborder: Polyphaga
- Infraorder: Cucujiformia
- Superfamily: Curculionoidea
- Family: Curculionidae
- Genus: Larinus
- Species: L. turbinatus

Binomial name
- Larinus turbinatus Gyllenhal, 1835

Synonyms
- Larinus (Phyllonomeus) turbinatus Gyllenhal, 1835; Larinodontes turbinatus Gyllenhal, 1836; Larinorrhynchus turbinatus

= Larinus turbinatus =

Species of beetle

Larinus turbinatus is a species of true weevil in the family of beetles known as Curculionidae.

== Etymology ==
The genus name Larínus (from ancient Greek λαρίνος, fat ) refers to the rounded body shape. The Latin species name turbinātus, means "cone-shaped" and refers to the shape of the snout.

== Distribution ==
This species is native to western Palaearctic and it is present in southern and central Europe (Albania, Austria, Bosnia and Herzegovina, Bulgaria, Croatia, Czech Republic, France, Germany, Greece, Hungary, Italy, Republic of Moldova, Poland, Portugal, Romania, Slovakia, Slovenia, Spain, Switzerland, Ukraine and Yugoslavia), Caucasus, western Russia, Asia Minor, Central Asia, Siberia and North Africa. It has been introduced in United States.

== Habitat ==
These warmth-loving weevils manly occur on open, warm slopes, in grassland, wet meadows and pastures, where thistles are also present.

== Description ==
Larinus turbinatus can reach a body length of about 4.00–9.00 mm (0.157–0.354 in). These weevils have a robust, oval, black body with many patches of gray setae, that appear yellowish by a yellowish secretion and adhering pollen. Its antennae are short with conspicuous clubs. The female's head and rostrum are blacker than those of the male.

The pronotum is transverse, rounded and strongly punctured, with tapering lateral margins. The elytra are irregularly covered with hair and finely striate. They are wider than the pronotum and have a rounded apex. The rostrum is robust, short and straight, conically tapering to apex. It shows a latero ventral ridge with a longitudinal groove. This species is similar in size and can be confused with Larinus carlinae.

== Biology ==
The females of Larinus turbinatus lay five to six eggs per day, each on one flower bud. It occurs that several females lay the eggs on the same flower head. The stronger larvae kill the weaker larvae, so that in the last larval stage, there is usually only one larva per flower. Pupation also takes place in the thistle blossom.

These diurnal weevils are oligophagous on various thistle species of the genera Carduus and Cirsium (family Asteraceae, tribe Cardueae), especially on Marsh Thistle (Cirsium palustre), Creeping Thistle (Cirsium arvense), Musk Thistle (Carduus nutans) and Cabbage Thistle (Cirsium oleraceum). They are occasionally observed on Silybum, Onopordum and Centaurea species.

== Gallery ==
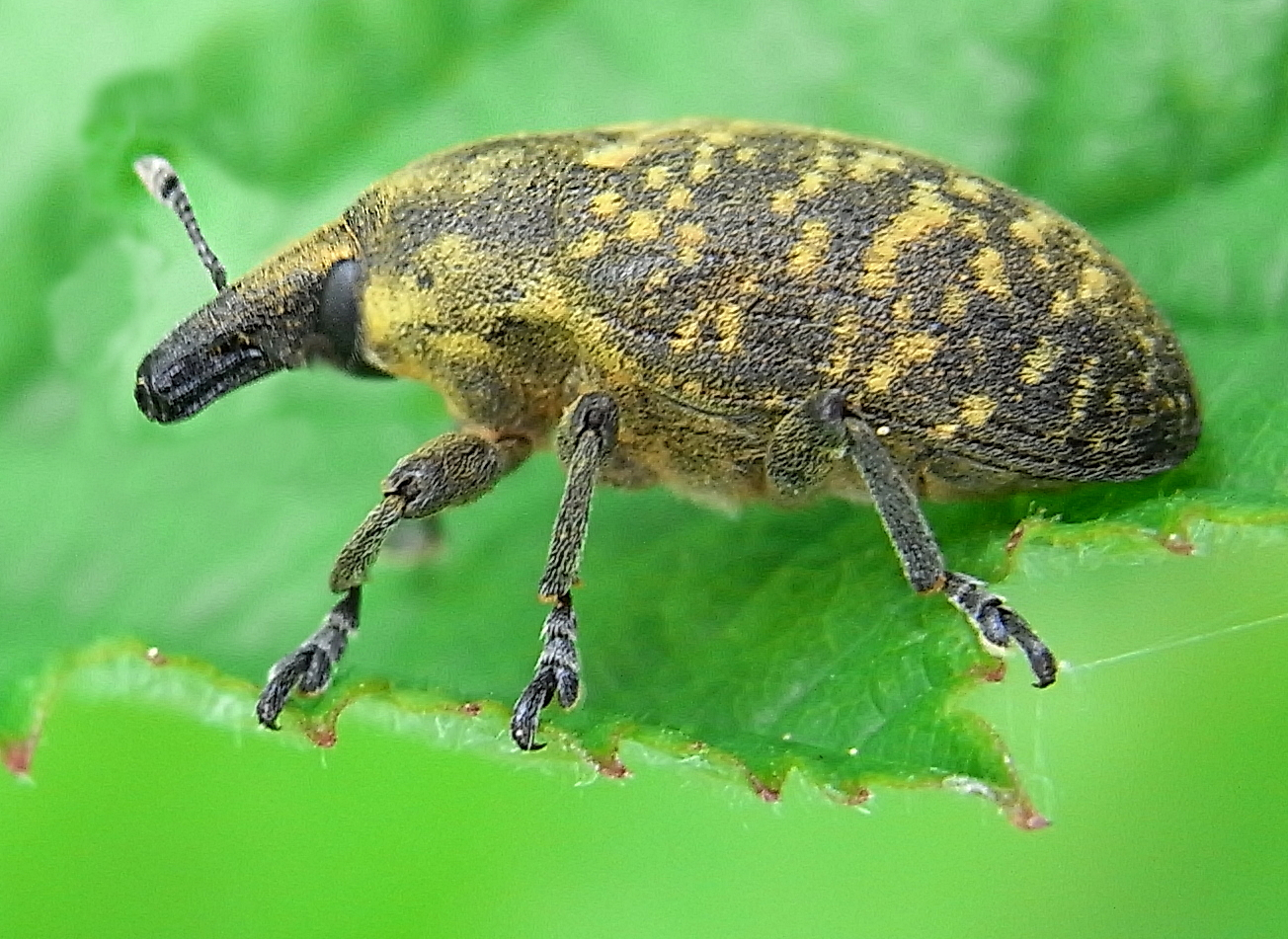
Side view

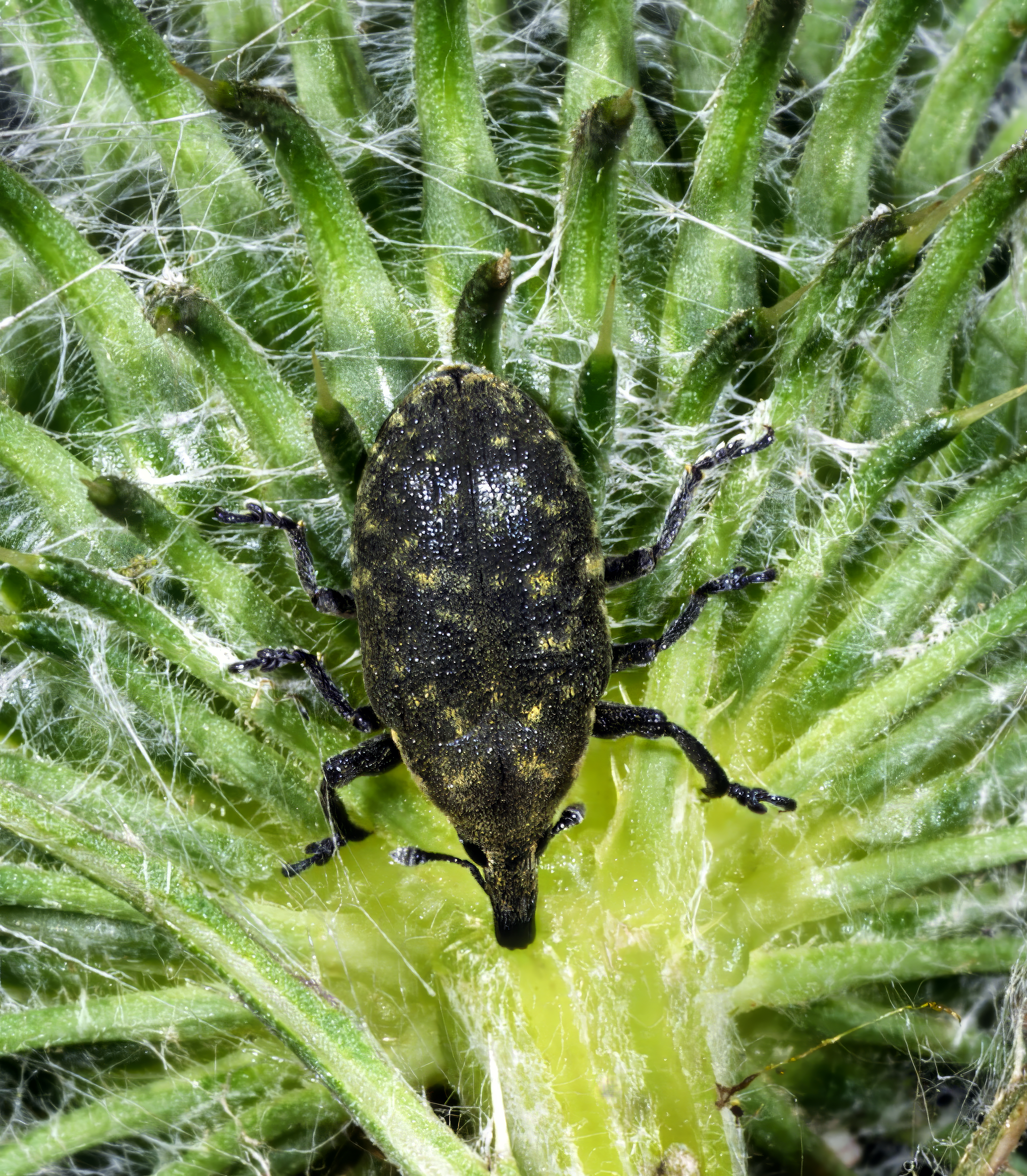
Dorsal view

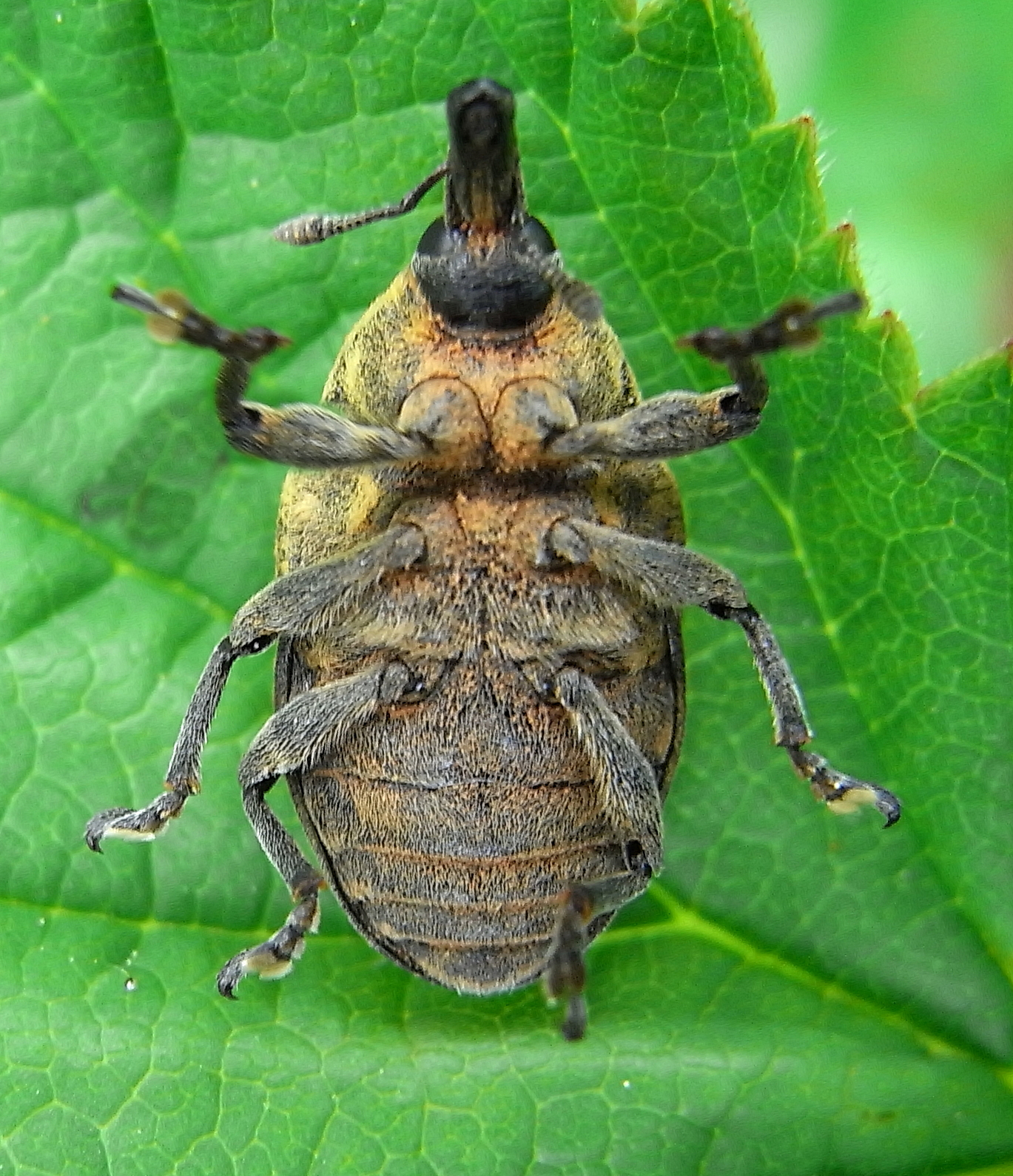
Ventral view

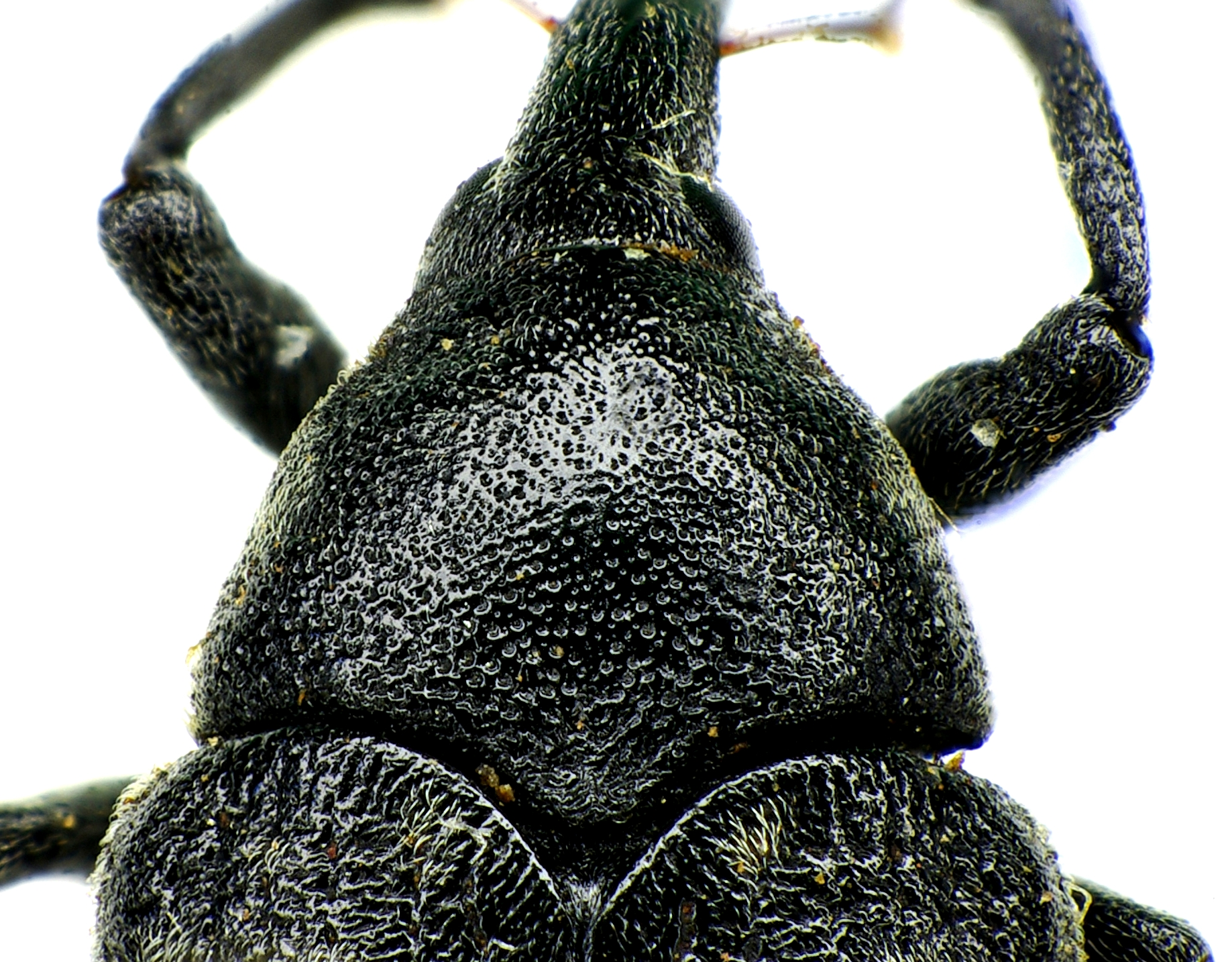
Close-up of pronotum
