= Zeuxia subapennina =

Scientific classification
- Kingdom: Animalia
- Phylum: Arthropoda
- Class: Insecta
- Order: Diptera
- Family: Tachinidae
- Subfamily: Dexiinae
- Tribe: Dexiini
- Genus: Zeuxia
- Species: Z. subapennina

Binomial name
- Zeuxia subapennina Rondani, 1862

Synonyms
- Tapinomyia piliseta Brauer & von Berganstamm, 1889; Zeuxia tsherepanovae Kolomiets, 1971

Species of fly

Zeuxia subapennina is a species of fly in the family Tachinidae.

== Distribution ==
Czech Republic, Hungary, Poland, Romania, Slovakia, Ukraine, Croatia, Italy, Slovenia, Spain, Turkey, Austria, France, Switzerland, Israel, Palestine, Russia, Transcaucasia.
