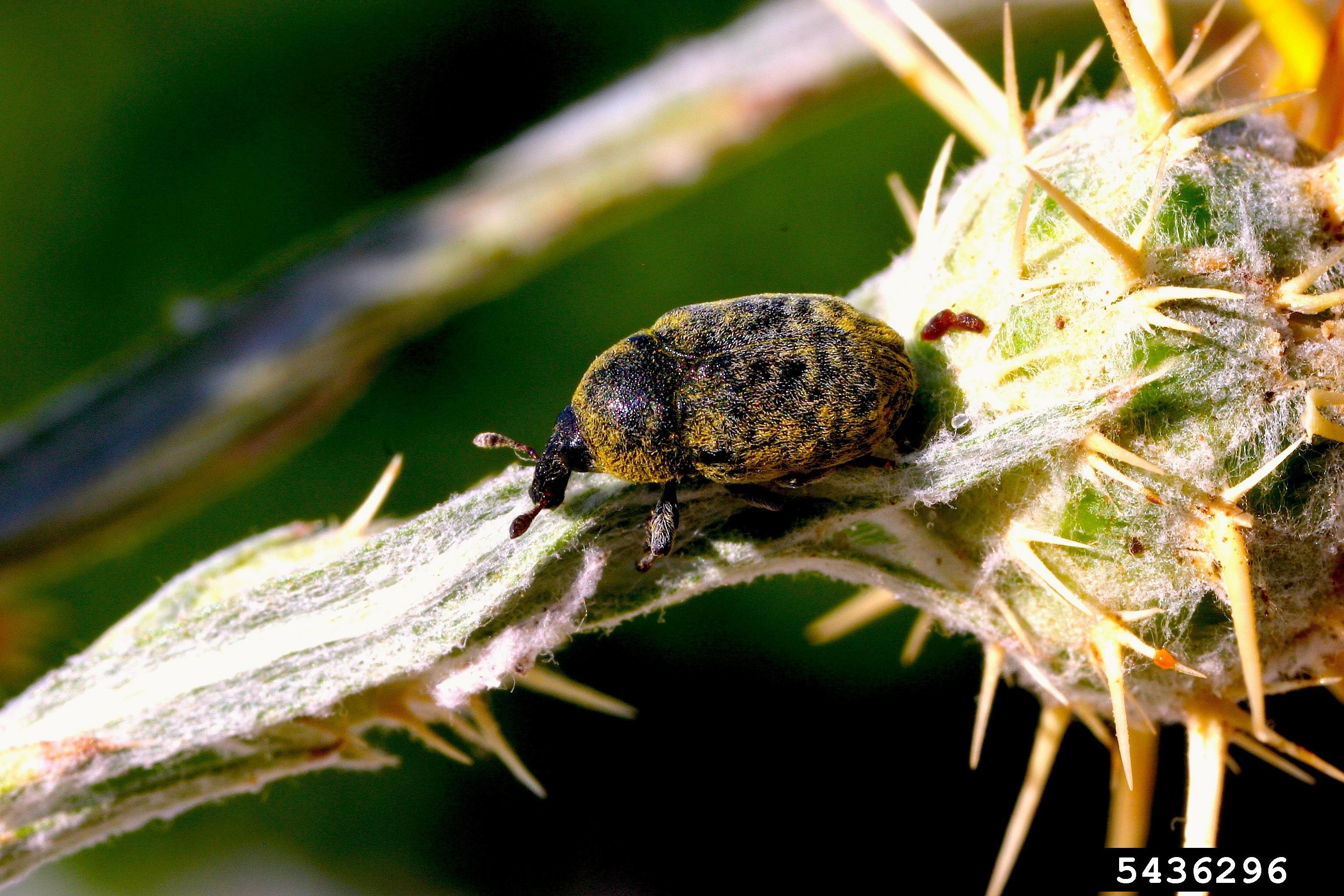

Scientific classification
- Kingdom: Animalia
- Phylum: Arthropoda
- Clade: Pancrustacea
- Class: Insecta
- Order: Coleoptera
- Suborder: Polyphaga
- Infraorder: Cucujiformia
- Superfamily: Curculionoidea
- Family: Curculionidae
- Genus: Larinus
- Species: L. curtus

Binomial name
- Larinus curtus Hochhut

= Larinus curtus =

Species of beetle

Larinus curtus is a species of true weevil known as the yellow starthistle flower weevil. It is native to Southern Italy, Southern Europe, the Middle East and the Caucasus. It is used as an agent of biological pest control against the noxious weed yellow starthistle (Centaurea solstitialis) in the United States.

The adult weevil is dark brown or black with light colored mottled hairs on its body. It is about 6 millimetres (1/4 in) long. The female lays glossy, milky white, oval-shaped eggs at the bases of open yellow starthistle flowers. The larva emerges from its egg in a few days and goes inside the flower head, where it feeds on the developing seeds. A larva is capable of destroying all of the seeds inside a given head, with an average reduction of 96%. The adult feeds on flowers and pollen but probably does little damage to the plant. It is the larva's impact on seed production that helps control the plant's spread.

There have been field reports of large numbers of adult L. curtis feeding on safflower flowers Carthamus tinctorius, but no evidence that larvae have successfully developed on this plant.

This weevil is native to southern Europe and the Mediterranean. It was first introduced to the United States as a biocontrol agent in 1992. It is now established throughout the Pacific Northwest, but in relatively low densities.
