= Larinus araxicola =

Scientific classification
- Kingdom: Animalia
- Phylum: Arthropoda
- Clade: Pancrustacea
- Class: Insecta
- Order: Coleoptera
- Suborder: Polyphaga
- Infraorder: Cucujiformia
- Superfamily: Curculionoidea
- Family: Curculionidae
- Genus: Larinus
- Species: L. araxicola

Binomial name
- Larinus araxicola Gultekin, 2006

Species of beetle

Larinus araxicola is a species of true weevil found in the Araks valley in northeastern Turkey.

The weevil feeds on Centaurea polypodiifolia L. (Asteraceae). Females lay eggs on the flowerheads, and larvae undergo development inside the flower heads.
