= Larinus pollinis =

Scientific classification
- Domain: Eukaryota
- Kingdom: Animalia
- Phylum: Arthropoda
- Class: Insecta
- Order: Coleoptera
- Suborder: Polyphaga
- Infraorder: Cucujiformia
- Family: Curculionidae
- Genus: Larinus
- Species: L. pollinis

Binomial name
- Larinus pollinis (Laicharting, 1781)

Synonyms
- List: Larinus brevis (Herbst, 1795); Larinus fringilla Gyllenhal, 1827; Larinus granicollis Boheman, 1843; Larinus jaceae (Herbst, 1795); Larinus lineatocollis Gyllenhal, 1835; Larinus morio Gyllenhal, 1835; Larinus rubripes Desbrochers, 1892; Larinus sanctaebalmae Abeille, 1872; Larinus senilis Fabricius, 1801; Curculio pollinis Laicharting, 1781; Curculio brevis Herbst, 1795; Curculio jaceae Herbst, 1795; Curculio senilis Fabricius, 1801; Rhynchaenus fringilla Gyllenhal, 1827; Larinus (Larinus) lineatocollis Gyllenhal, 1835; Larinus (Larinus) morio Gyllenhal, 1835; Larinus (Larinus) granicollis Boheman, 1843; Larinus (Larinus) sanctaebalmae Abeille, 1872; Larinus (Larinus) rubripes Desbrochers, 1892; Larinus (Larinus) jaceae; Larinus (Larinus) lineatocollis

Species of beetle

Larinus pollinis is a species of weevil belonging to the family Curculionidae and the subfamily Lixinae.

== Distribution ==
This species is present in most of Europe (Austria, Bosnia and Herzegovina, Bulgaria, Croatia, Czech Republic, France, Germany, Hungary, Italy, Poland, Romania, Slovakia, Switzerland and Ukraine), in the East Palearctic realm, in North Africa, in the Oriental realm and in the Near East. These weevils occur in grasslands.

== Description ==
Larinus pollinis can reach a body length of about 10 mm (0.39 in). These weevils have an ovate, black, sub-opaque body, with many patches of gray setae, that appear yellowish by a yellowish secretion and adhering pollen. The rostrum is shorter than the thorax, with only a carina at the base.

Mature pupae show more than 40 setae on their pronotum.

== Biology ==
The adults can be encountered from May through August. This oligophagous species mainly feeds on Arctium tomentosum, Onopordon acanthium, Carlina vulgaris, etc.
