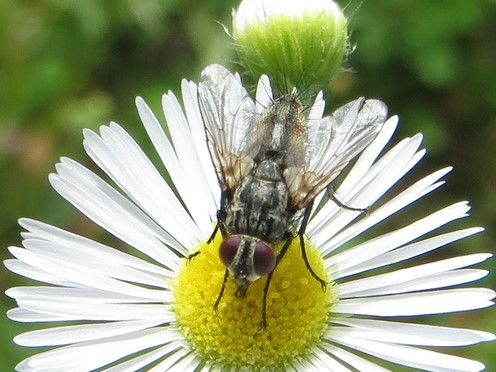
- Zeuxia cinerea

Scientific classification
- Kingdom: Animalia
- Phylum: Arthropoda
- Class: Insecta
- Order: Diptera
- Family: Tachinidae
- Subfamily: Dexiinae
- Tribe: Dexiini
- Genus: Zeuxia; Meigen, 1826

Type species
- Zeuxia cinerea Meigen, 1826

Synonyms
- Ptilocera Robineau-Desvoidy, 1830; Ptilocerina Macquart, 1835; Ptilocheta Rondani, 1857; Ptylocera Rondani, 1861; Eggeria Rondani, 1862 (Preocc.); Peyritschia Brauer & von Bergenstamm, 1889; Tapinomyia Brauer & von Bergenstamm, 1889; Ptilozeuxia Brauer & von Bergenstamm, 1889; Ptilochoeta Bezzi, 1894; Apeyritschia Villeneuve, 1932; Anazeuxia Mesnil, 1980; Zeuxilla Mesnil, 1980; Kolomietsina Mesnil, 1980

= Zeuxia =

Genus of flies

Zeuxia is a genus of flies in the family Tachinidae.

== Species ==
- Zeuxia aberrans (Loew, 1847)
- Zeuxia antoniae Tschorsnig, 1984
- Zeuxia brevicornis (Egger, 1860)
- Zeuxia cinerea Meigen, 1826
- Zeuxia dahurica Kolomiets, 1971
- Zeuxia elegans Mesnil, 1963
- Zeuxia erythraea (Egger, 1856)
- Zeuxia mongolica Richter, 1974
- Zeuxia montivaga Kolomiets, 1971
- Zeuxia nudigena Belanovsky, 1951
- Zeuxia roederi (Villeneuve, 1932)
- Zeuxia rubrapex Mesnil, 1963
- Zeuxia sicardi Villeneuve, 1920
- Zeuxia subapennina Rondani, 1862
- Zeuxia tessellata Egger, 1860
- Zeuxia tricolor (Portschinsky, 1881)
- Zeuxia zejana Kolomiets, 1971
- Zeuxia zernyi Mesnil, 1963
