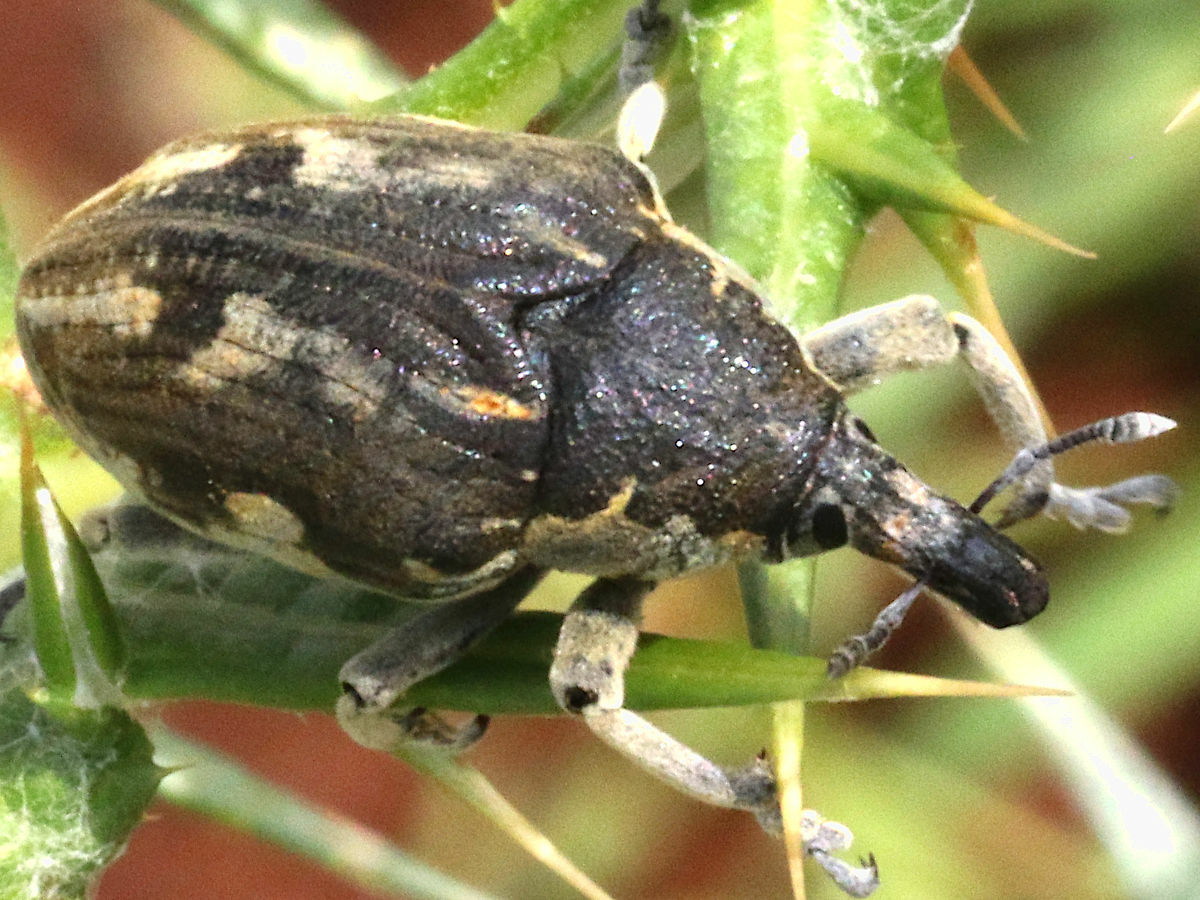
- Dorsal view
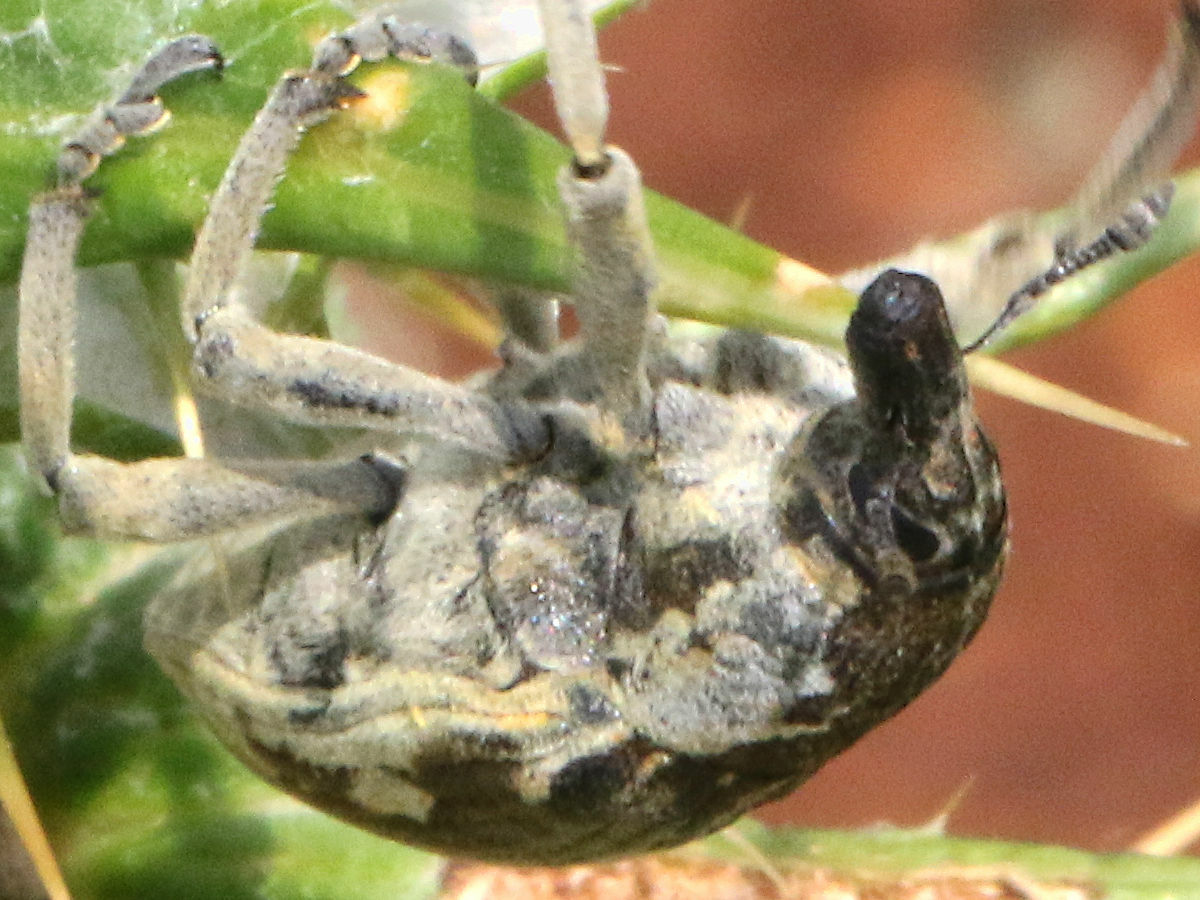
- Ventral view

Scientific classification
- Kingdom: Animalia
- Phylum: Arthropoda
- Clade: Pancrustacea
- Class: Insecta
- Order: Coleoptera
- Suborder: Polyphaga
- Infraorder: Cucujiformia
- Family: Curculionidae
- Genus: Larinus
- Species: L. onopordi

Binomial name
- Larinus onopordi (Fabricius, 1787)

Synonyms
- List: Curculio onopordi Fabricius, 1787; Larinus mirei Hoffmann, 1962; Larinus onopordinis Schönherr, 1825 (unjustified emendation) u.em.; Larinus uniformis Petri, 1907

= Larinus onopordi =

Species of beetle

Larinus onopordi, also known as the globe thistle capitulum weevil, is a species of true weevil in the genus Larinus.

== Range ==
This species is found in regions surrounding the Mediterranean Sea.

== Ecology ==
Larinus onopordi is univoltine, undergoing one generation per year. Females lay eggs in the capitulum (flowerhead) of globe thistles, mainly Echinops sphaerocephalus, Echinops orientalis and Echinops pungens. Larvae develop in the capitulum, eating and destroying the seeds. Pupation occurs in late summer, and a new generation of adults emerge after a few days.

The braconid wasp Bracon facialis has been reared from the pupal stage.
