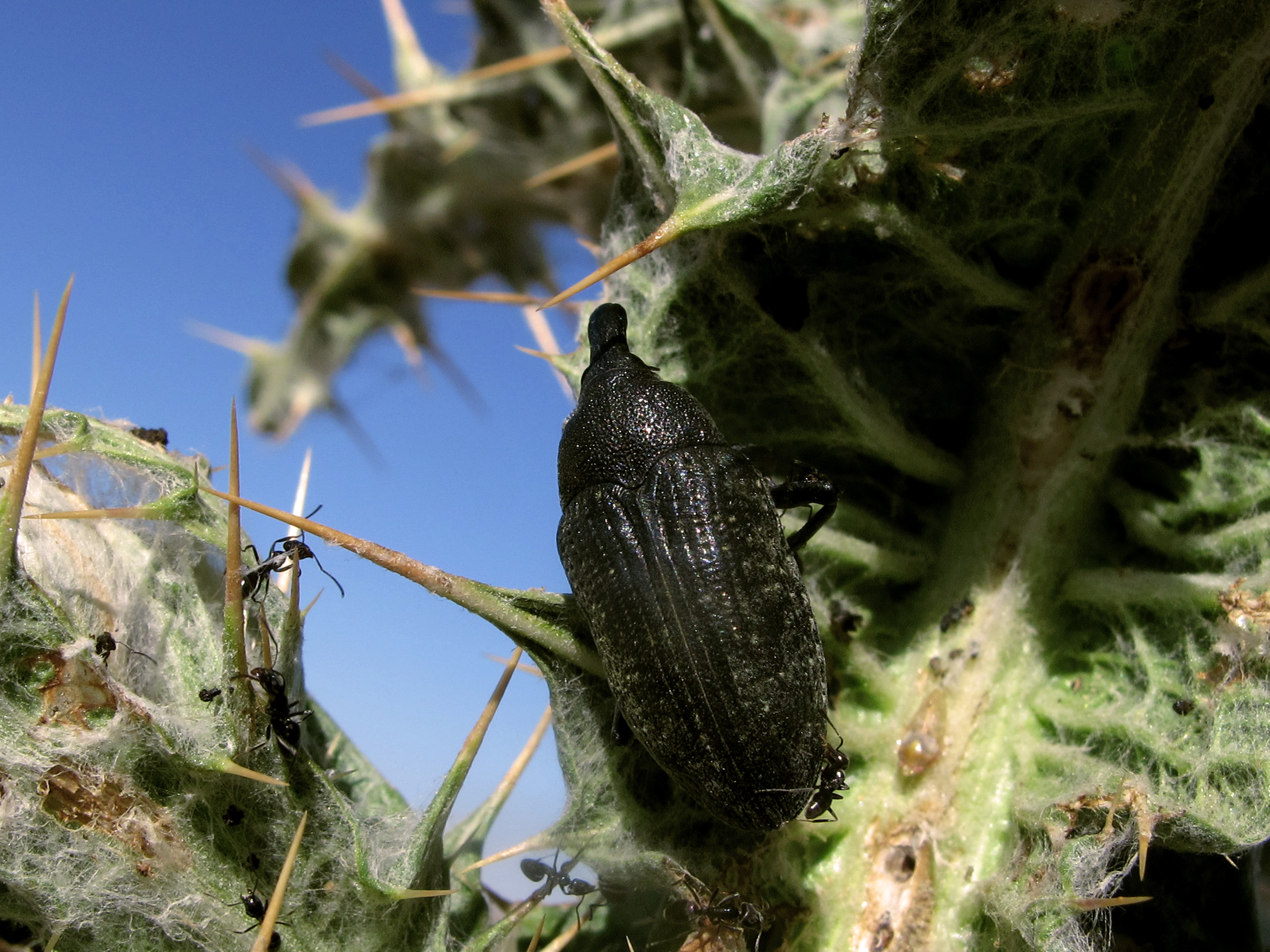

Scientific classification
- Kingdom: Animalia
- Phylum: Arthropoda
- Clade: Pancrustacea
- Class: Insecta
- Order: Coleoptera
- Suborder: Polyphaga
- Infraorder: Cucujiformia
- Superfamily: Curculionoidea
- Family: Curculionidae
- Genus: Larinus
- Species: L. latus

Binomial name
- Larinus latus Herbst

= Larinus latus =

Species of beetle

Larinus latus is a species of true weevil. It is used as an agent of biological pest control against Onopordum thistles in Australia.
