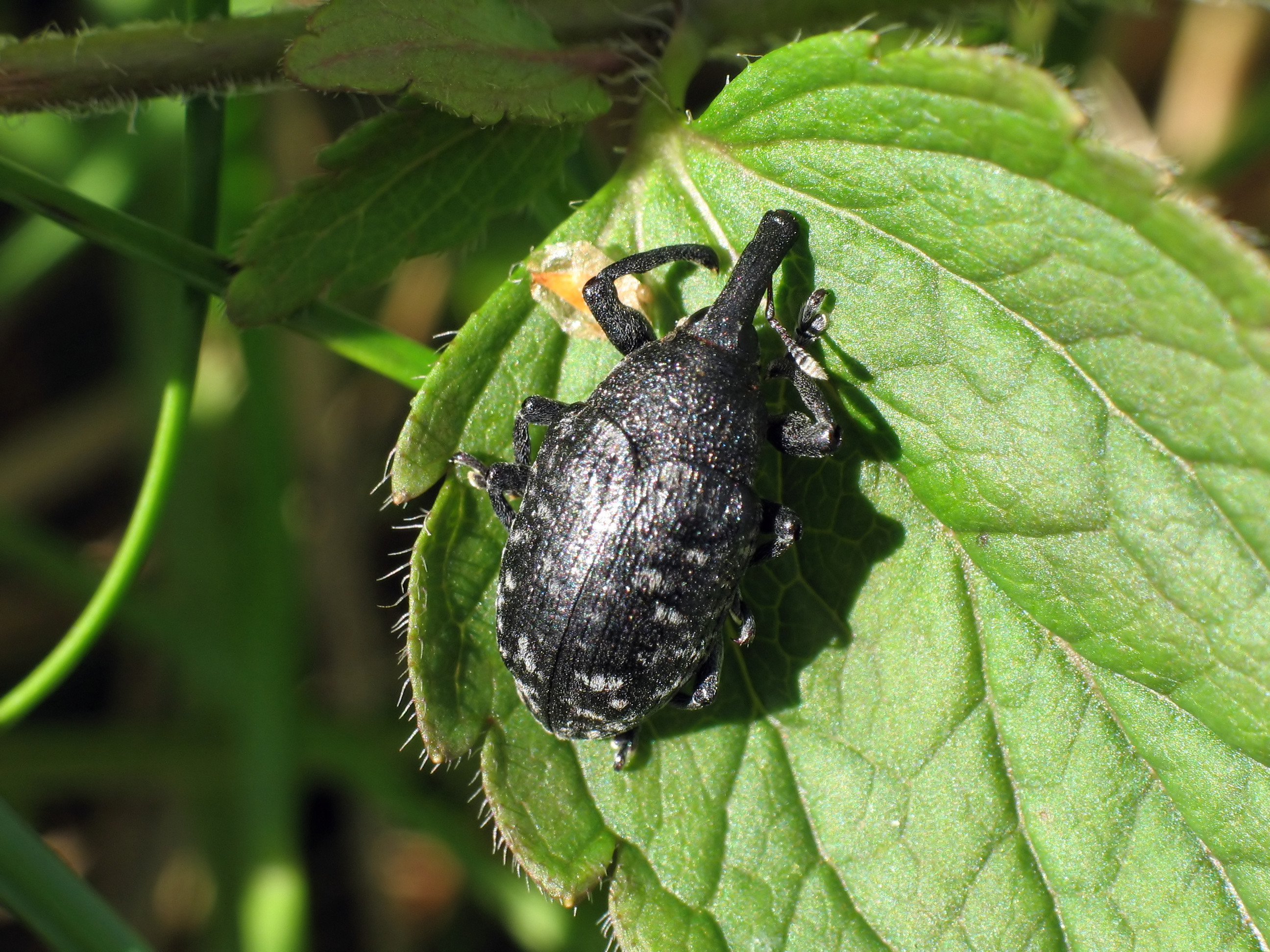
- Larinus sturnus

Scientific classification
- Kingdom: Animalia
- Phylum: Arthropoda
- Class: Insecta
- Order: Coleoptera
- Suborder: Polyphaga
- Infraorder: Cucujiformia
- Family: Curculionidae
- Subfamily: Lixinae
- Tribe: Lixini
- Genus: Larinus; Dejean, 1821

Species
- 180+, see text

= Larinus =

Genus of beetles

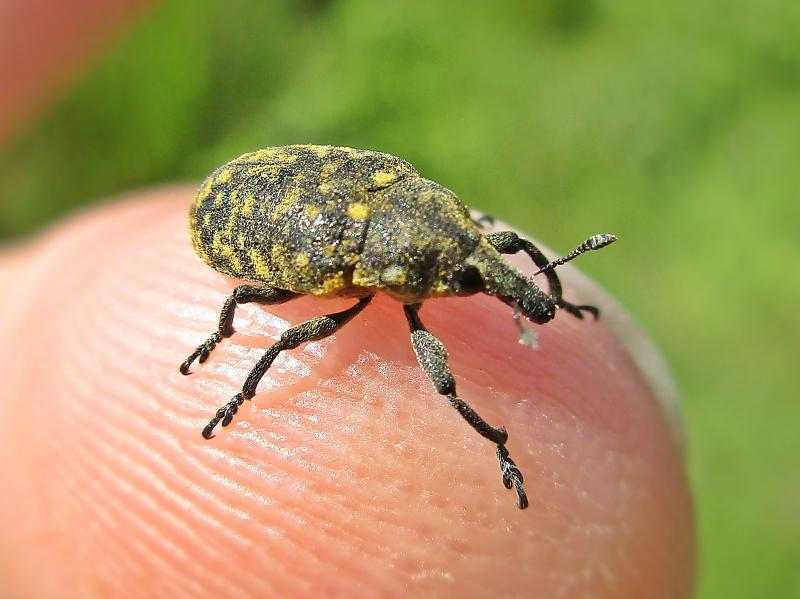
Larinus turbinatus

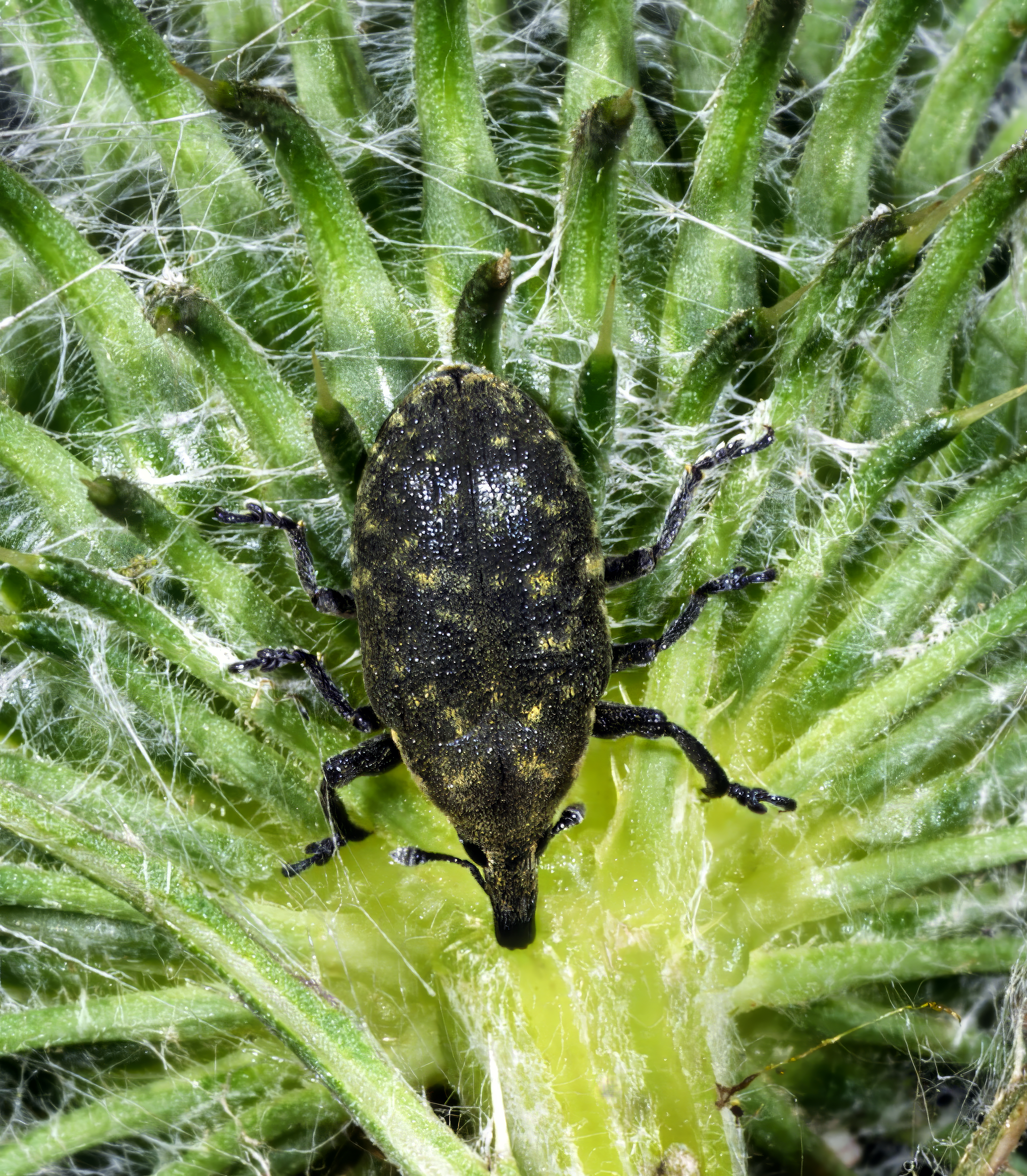
Larinus turbinatus

Larinus is a genus of true weevils, comprising about 180 species, mostly in the Palaearctic region with some species introduced to North America. Turkey appears to have a significant diversity of the group, with more than 50 species recorded in the eastern part of the country.

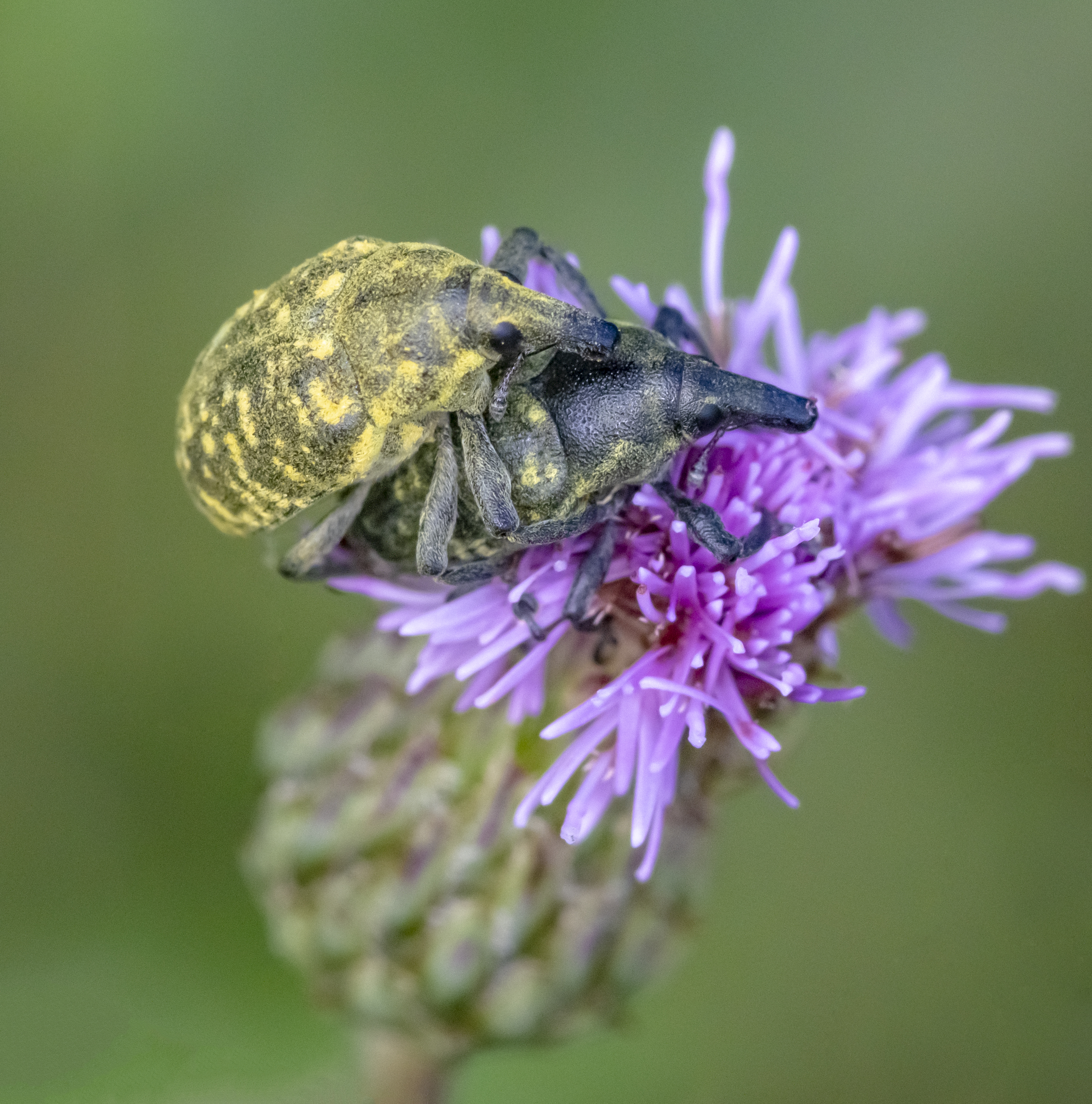
Canada thistle bud weevils (subgenus Phyllonomeus) mating

Several of these beetles are used as agents of biological pest control against noxious weeds. They feed on flower heads, destroying the developing seeds of the weeds.

== Description ==
In simple terms, Larinus are black weevils with stocky bodies. They are rounded and slightly oblate dorsoventrally. They are covered in sparse hairs.

According to a more detailed description, Larinus are stocky in shape unlike the related genus Lixus. The rostrum is almost always shorter than the pronotum or as long as the pronotum. There are antennal furrows on the rostrum and these do not extend forward to the tip. The eyes are flat or slightly bulging. The pronotum is always transverse and strongly narrowed towards the front. On the sides of the pronotum are light gray or yellowish hairs. The elytra are short, usually about 1.5 times as long as their total width. The apices of the elytra are rounded together. In fresh specimens, the elytra are mottled with irregular patches of pale hairs. The legs are short and robust.

== Ecology ==
Larvae of Larinus live in flower heads of plants in the family Asteraceae. They consume ovarioles, achenes and receptacle tissue. They also pupate in flower heads. Adults feed on leaves, stems, flowers, buds, peduncles and possibly pollen of their host plants.

== Species ==
These species belong to the genus Larinus:

- Larinus araxicola Gultekin, 2006
- Larinus bombycinus Lucas, H., 1847^{g}
- Larinus brevis
- Larinus bronni Heyden, C. von & Heyden, L. von., 1866^{g}
- Larinus byrrhinus (Sparrman, A., 1785)^{g}
- Larinus cardopatii Lucas, H., 1847^{g}
- Larinus carlinae Olivier, 1807^{g}
- Larinus carthami Olivier, 1807^{g}
- Larinus centaurea Oliver, 1807
- Larinus centaurii Olivier, 1807^{g}
- Larinus cuniculus Olivier, 1807^{g}
- Larinus curtus Hochhuth, 1851^{b} (yellow star thistle flower weevil)
- Larinus cylindrus Hoffmann, 1963^{g}
- Larinus cynarae (Fabricius, J.C., 1787)^{g}
- Larinus filiformis Petri
- Larinus flavescens
- Larinus gigas
- Larinus gravidus Olivier, 1807^{g}
- Larinus grisescens Gyllenhal
- Larinus hierolosymae Desbrochers, 1896^{g}
- Larinus iaceae (Fabricius, J.C., 1775)^{g}
- Larinus jaceae (Fabricius, 1775)^{g}
- Larinus latus (Herbst, J.F.W., 1783)^{g}
- Larinus longirostris Foerster, B., 1891^{g}
- Larinus minutus Gyllenhal, 1835^{b} (seedhead weevil)
- Larinus nanus Lucas, H., 1847^{g}
- Larinus numidicus Desbrochers, 1892^{g}
- Larinus obtusus Sturm, 1826^{b} (knapweed seedhead weevil)
- Larinus ochreatus Schoenherr, 1835^{g}
- Larinus onopordi (Fabricius, J.C., 1787)^{g}
- Larinus orientalis Capiomont, 1874
- Larinus planus (Fabricius, 1792)^{i g b} (Canada thistle bud weevil, 2016 synonym of L. carlinae)
- Larinus pollinis (Laicharting, J.N.E. von, 1781)^{g}
- Larinus scolymi Germar, 1824^{g}
- Larinus senilis Fabricius, 1801^{g}
- Larinus serratulae Capiomont, 1874^{g}
- Larinus sibiricus
- Larinus sturnus Schaller, 1783^{g}
- Larinus turbinatus Gyllenhal, 1835^{b}
- Larinus ursus Germar, 1824^{g}
- Larinus vulpes Olivier, 1807^{g}

Data sources: i = ITIS, g = GBIF, b = Bugguide.net
