= Larinus sibiricus =

Scientific classification
- Kingdom: Animalia
- Phylum: Arthropoda
- Clade: Pancrustacea
- Class: Insecta
- Order: Coleoptera
- Suborder: Polyphaga
- Infraorder: Cucujiformia
- Superfamily: Curculionoidea
- Family: Curculionidae
- Genus: Larinus
- Species: L. sibiricus

Binomial name
- Larinus sibiricus Gyllenhal, 1835

Species of beetle

Larinus sibiricus is a species of true weevil found in Eastern Europe and the Middle East.

The weevil feeds on Xeranthemum annuum (Asteraceae). Females lay eggs on the flowerheads, and larvae undergo development inside the flower heads. The species' larvae are parasitized by Bracon urinator (Hymenoptera: Braconidae) and Zeuxia cinerea (Diptera: Tachinidae).
