= Larinus filiformis =

Scientific classification
- Kingdom: Animalia
- Phylum: Arthropoda
- Clade: Pancrustacea
- Class: Insecta
- Order: Coleoptera
- Suborder: Polyphaga
- Infraorder: Cucujiformia
- Superfamily: Curculionoidea
- Family: Curculionidae
- Genus: Larinus
- Species: L. filiformis

Binomial name
- Larinus filiformis Petri, 1907

Species of beetle

Larinus filiformis is a species of true weevil found in Armenia, Azerbaijan, Turkey, and Bulgaria.

The weevil's main host plant in its native range is yellow starthistle Centaurea solstitialis. For this reason, there is interest in determining whether L. filiformis would be a good candidate for classical biological control of the noxious weed. In the field, this weevil has only been reported on yellow starthistle.

== Life history ==
Larinus filiformis is univoltine in Turkey. Females lay eggs on the flowerheads, and larvae undergo development inside the flower heads. Adults emerge in spring when the temperature reaches about 20 °C (68 °F).

It is most common at an elevation of 1,000 to 1,400 metres (3,300 to 4,600 ft) in Turkey.

== Parasitism ==
Larinus filiformis is parasitized by: Bracon urinator (F.), Bracon tshitsherini Kok. (Braconidae), Exeristes roborator Fab. (Ichneumonidae), Aprostocetus sp. (Eulophidae), and unidentified species of Eurytomidae and Ormyridae.
