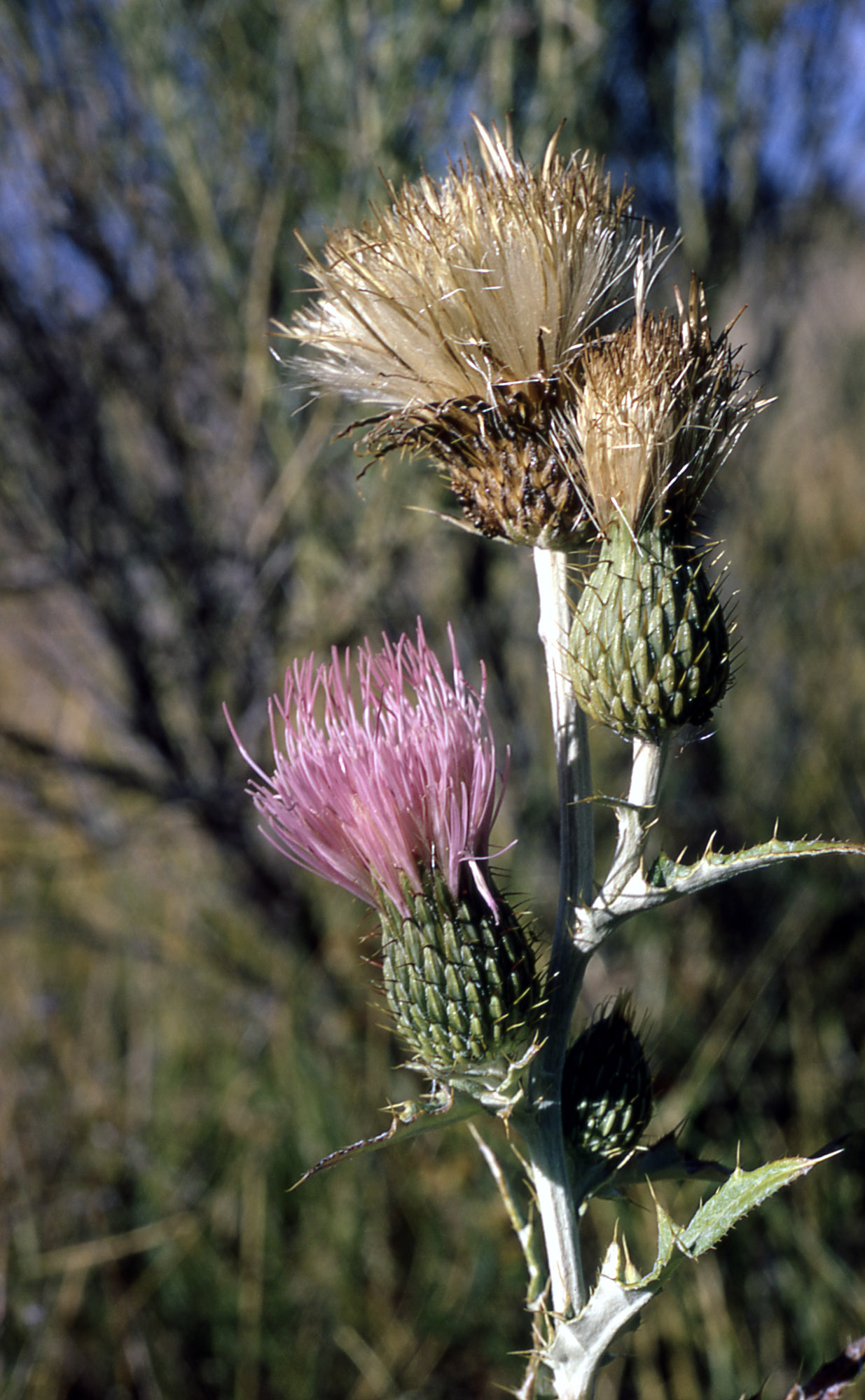

Conservation status
- Secure (NatureServe)

Scientific classification
- Kingdom: Plantae
- Clade: Tracheophytes
- Clade: Angiosperms
- Clade: Eudicots
- Clade: Asterids
- Order: Asterales
- Family: Asteraceae
- Genus: Cirsium
- Species: C. undulatum

Binomial name
- Cirsium undulatum (Nutt.) Spreng.

Synonyms
- Carduus megacephalus A.Nelson; Carduus undulatus Nutt.; Cirsium megacephalum (A.Gray) Cockerell ex Daniels; Cnicus undulatus (Nutt.) A.Gray

= Cirsium undulatum =

Species of thistle

Cirsium undulatum is a species of thistle known by the common names wavyleaf thistle and gray thistle. It is native to much of central and western North America from British Columbia east to Manitoba and south as far as the State of Durango in Mexico. It has also been found outside of its native range as an introduced species.

Cirsium undulatum is widespread and found in many habitat types. It is a perennial herb exceeding 200 cm (79 in) in height. The stem branches a few times toward the top of the plant if at all. The leaves are very wavy along the edges and usually cut into shallow toothed lobes. The longest near the base of the plant are up to 30 centimetres (12 inches) long. The inflorescence holds one or more flower heads each up to 5 centimetres (2.0 inches) long and wide. The head is lined with spiny phyllaries of different shapes. The flowers in the head are white to lavender to pink and up to 5 centimetres (2.0 inches) long. The fruit is an achene a few millimeters long with a pappus which may be up to 4 centimeters in length.

Cirsium undulatum has been shown to have its seed production reduced by an exotic weevil Larinus planus which was released to control Canada thistle.
