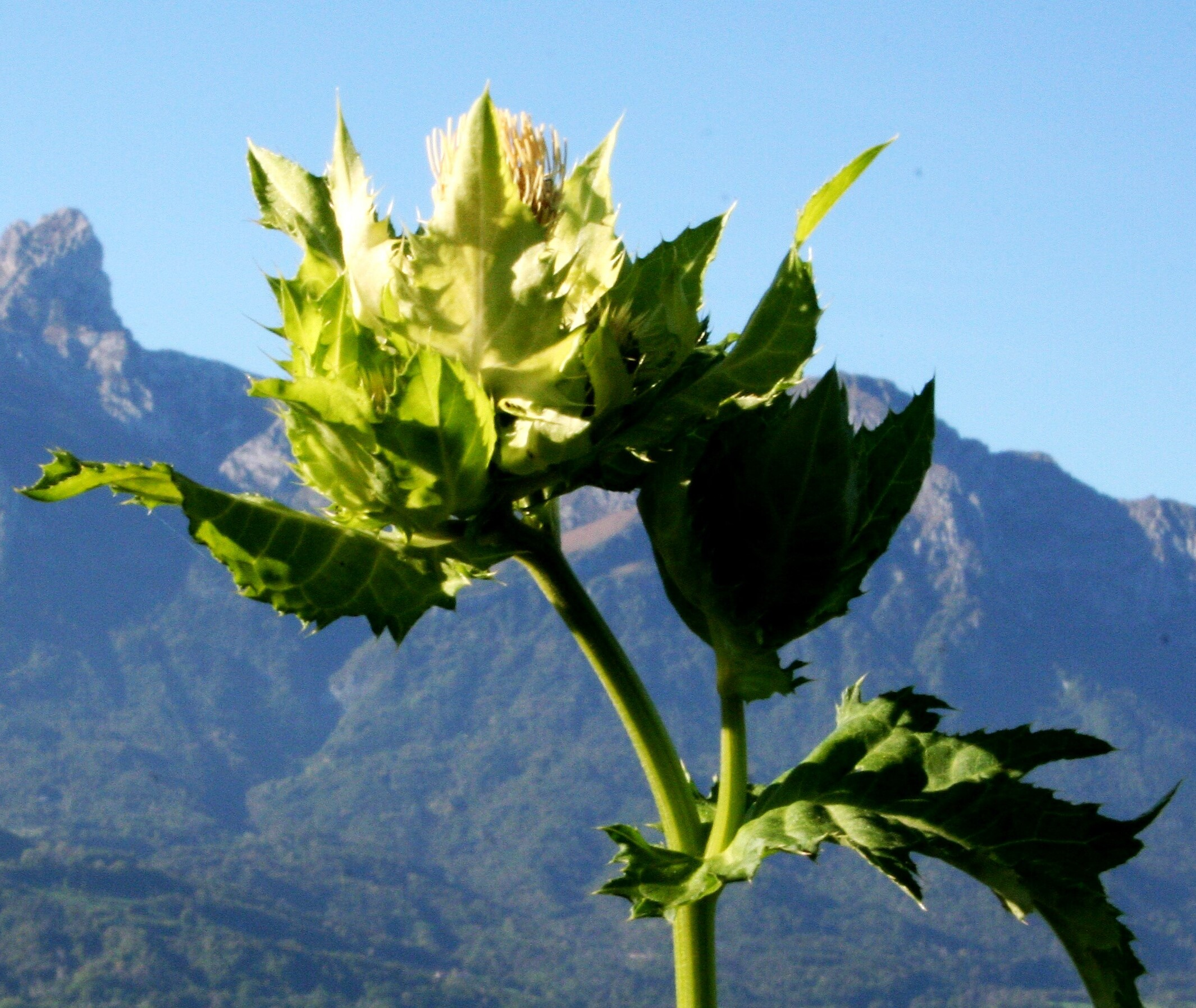
- Flowerhead with Tatra Mountains
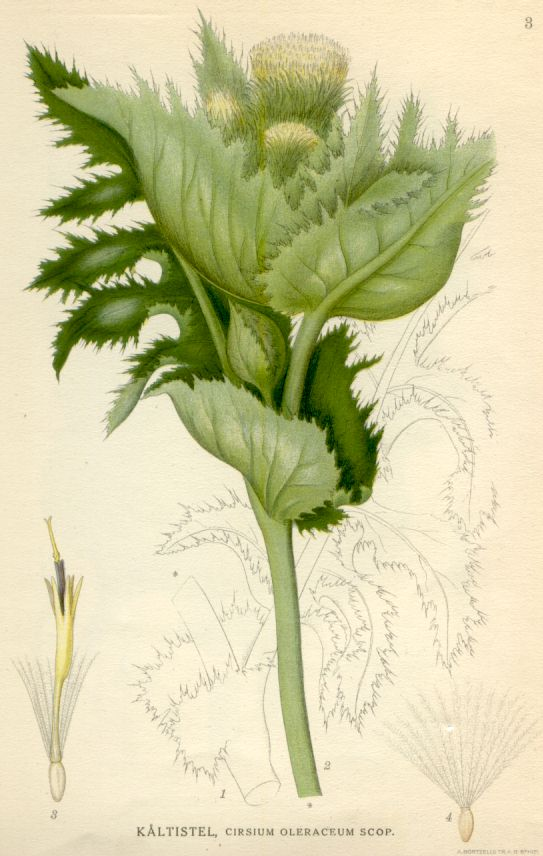
- Painting by C. A. M. Lindman

Scientific classification
- Kingdom: Plantae
- Clade: Tracheophytes
- Clade: Angiosperms
- Clade: Eudicots
- Clade: Asterids
- Order: Asterales
- Family: Asteraceae
- Genus: Cirsium
- Species: C. oleraceum

Binomial name
- Cirsium oleraceum (L.) Scop.

Synonyms
- Synonymy: Carduus acanthifolius Lam.; Carduus oleraceus (L.) Vill.; Carduus parviflorus L.; Carduus rigens Dryand. ex Aiton; Carduus tataricus L.; Cirsium braunii Nyman; Cirsium flavescens Lam.; Cirsium pallens DC.; Cirsium parviflorum DC.; Cirsium parviflorum Schleich. ex Steud.; Cirsium praemorsum W.D.J.Koch; Cirsium rigens Spreng.; Cirsium subalatum Gaudin; Cirsium thomasii Nägeli; Cirsium variabile Moench; Cnicus oleraceus L.; Cynara colorata Stokes

= Cirsium oleraceum =

Species of thistle

Cirsium oleraceum, the cabbage thistle or Siberian thistle, is a species of thistle in the genus Cirsium within the family Asteraceae, native to central and eastern Europe and Asia, where it grows in wet lowland soils.

Cirsium oleraceum is a herbaceous perennial plant growing to 1.5 m tall, the stems unbranched or with only a very few branches. The leaves are broad and ovoid, with a weakly spiny margin, being pinnatipartite. The flowers are produced in dense flower heads which are 2.5–4 cm diameter, pale yellow, but sometimes tinged pink.

Its specific epithet oleraceum means "vegetable/herbal" in Latin and is a form of holeraceus (oleraceus).

== Distribution ==
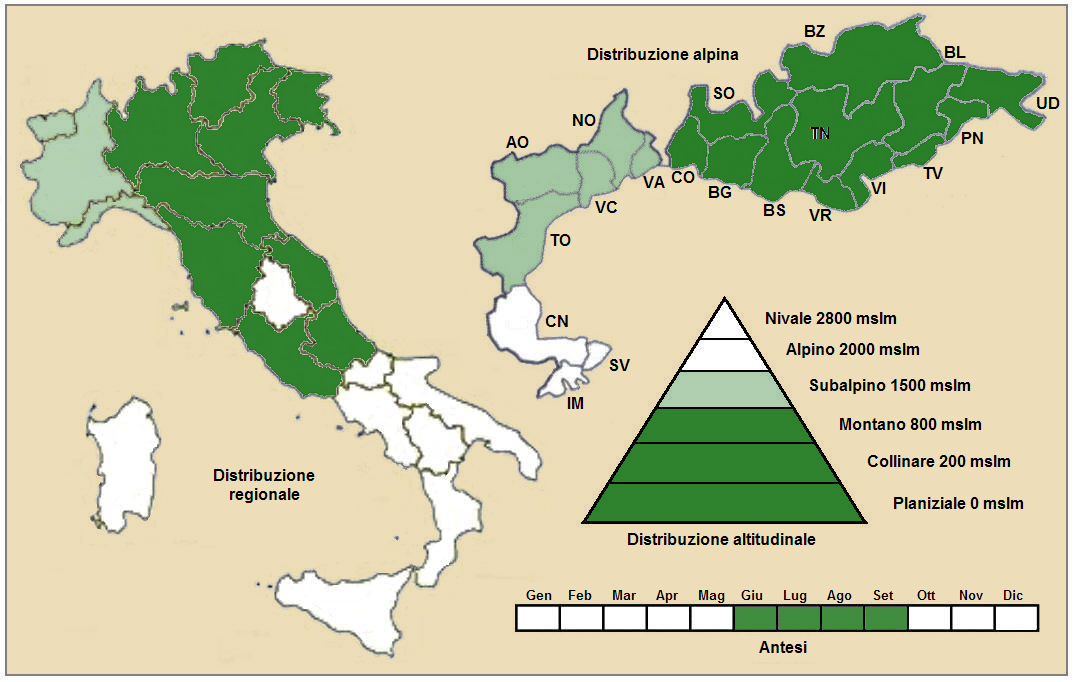
Italian distribution

It is found native throughout Europe, with the exception of Portugal, Albania, North Macedonia, Greece, Crimea, Ciscaucasia, Povolzhye, and the Mediterranean islands. It is found naturalised in the British Isles, Finland, and Central Siberia. It is also native to West Siberia, the Altai, and Kazakhstan.

== Usage ==
For cooking: In salads the young stems and leaves are edible, and cultivated for food in Japan and India.

== Gallery ==
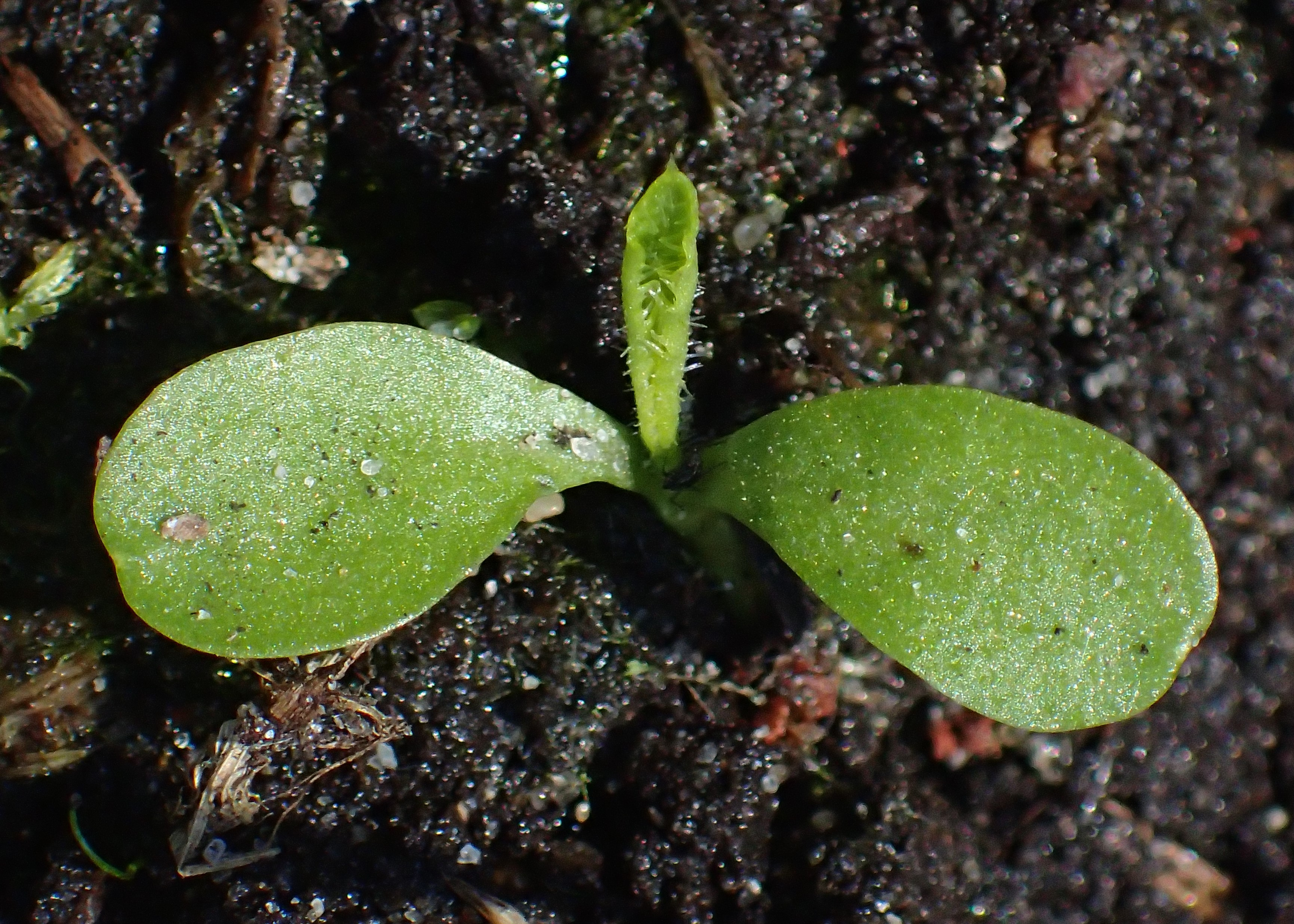
Seedling

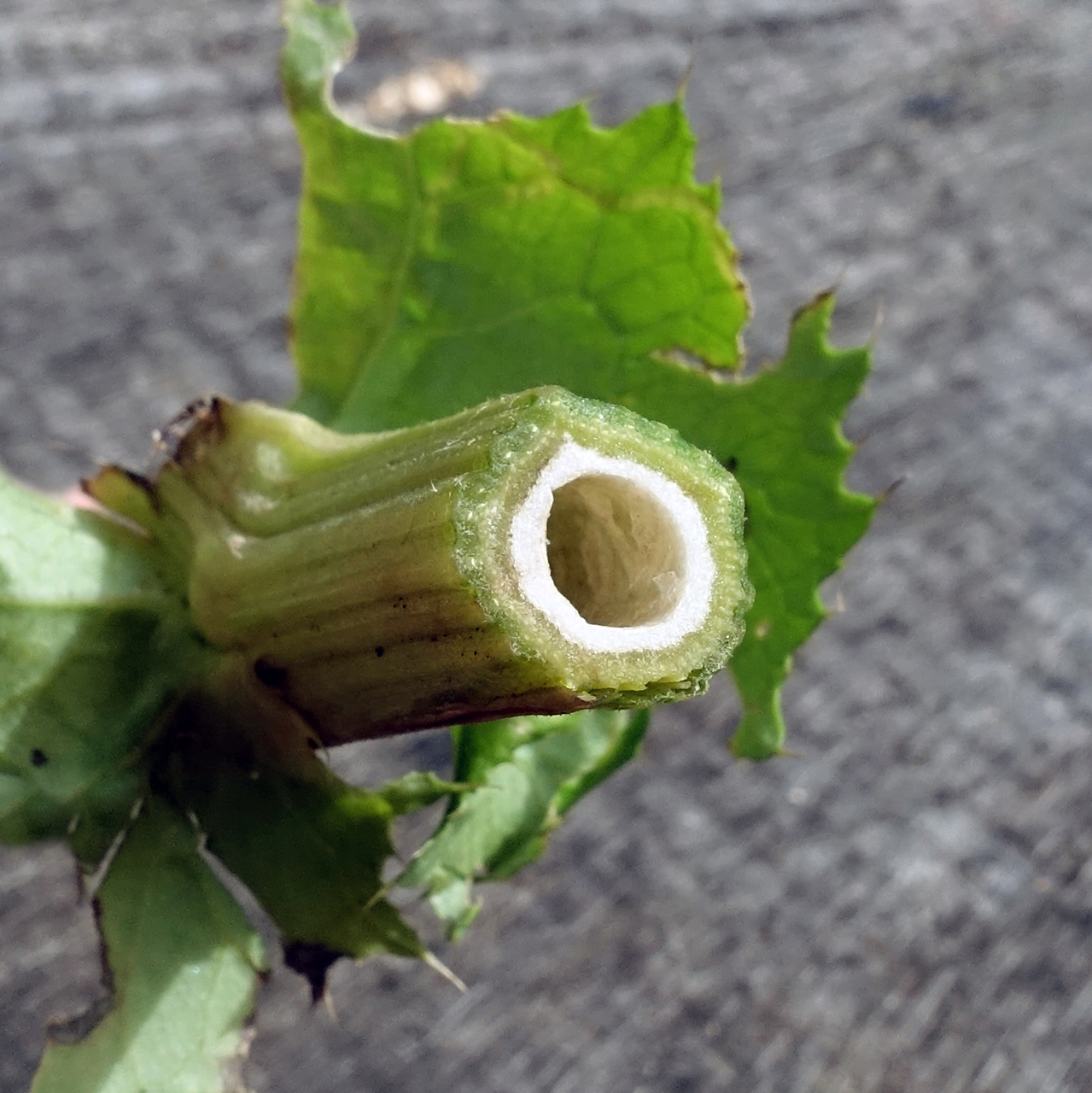
Stem (cross-section)

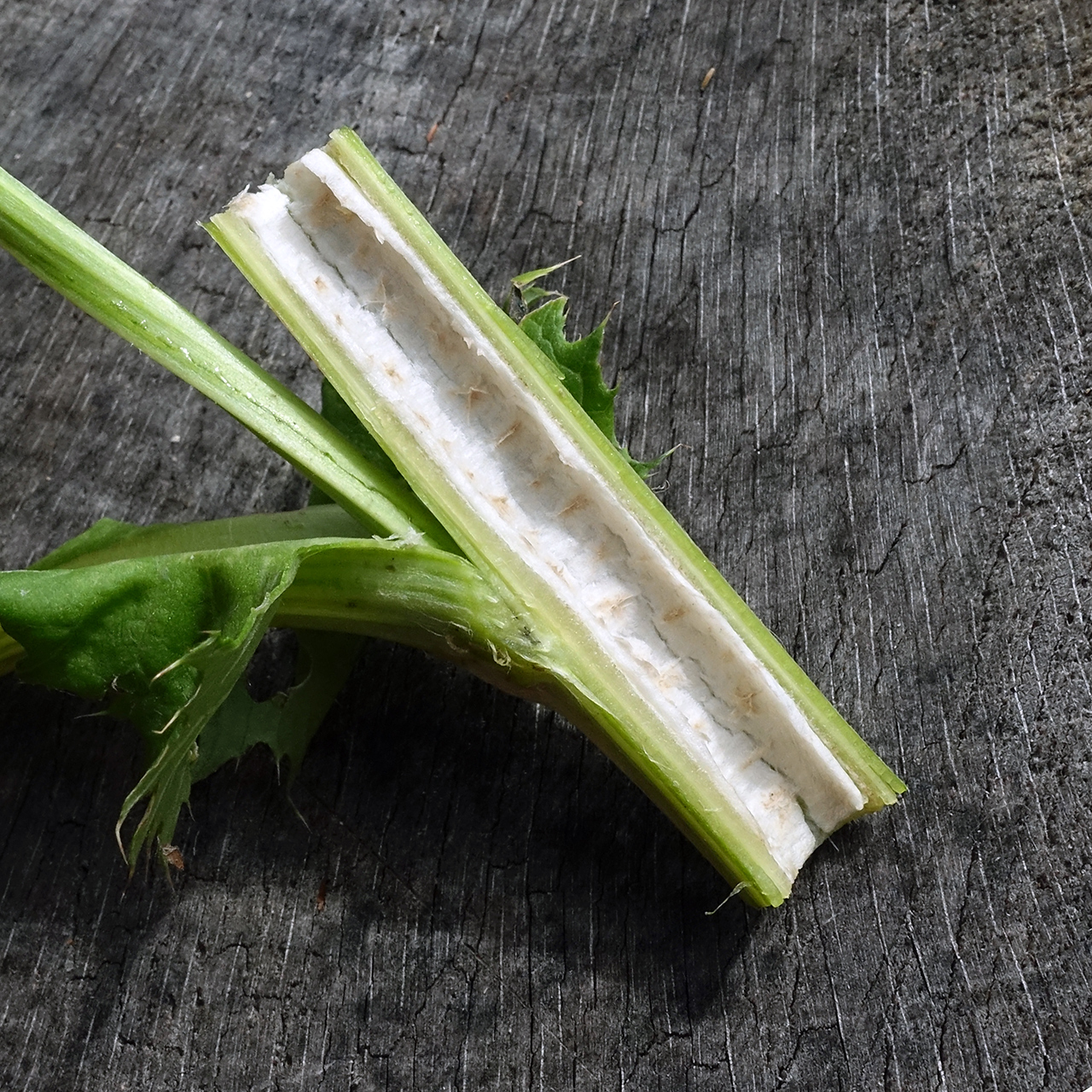
Stem (halved)

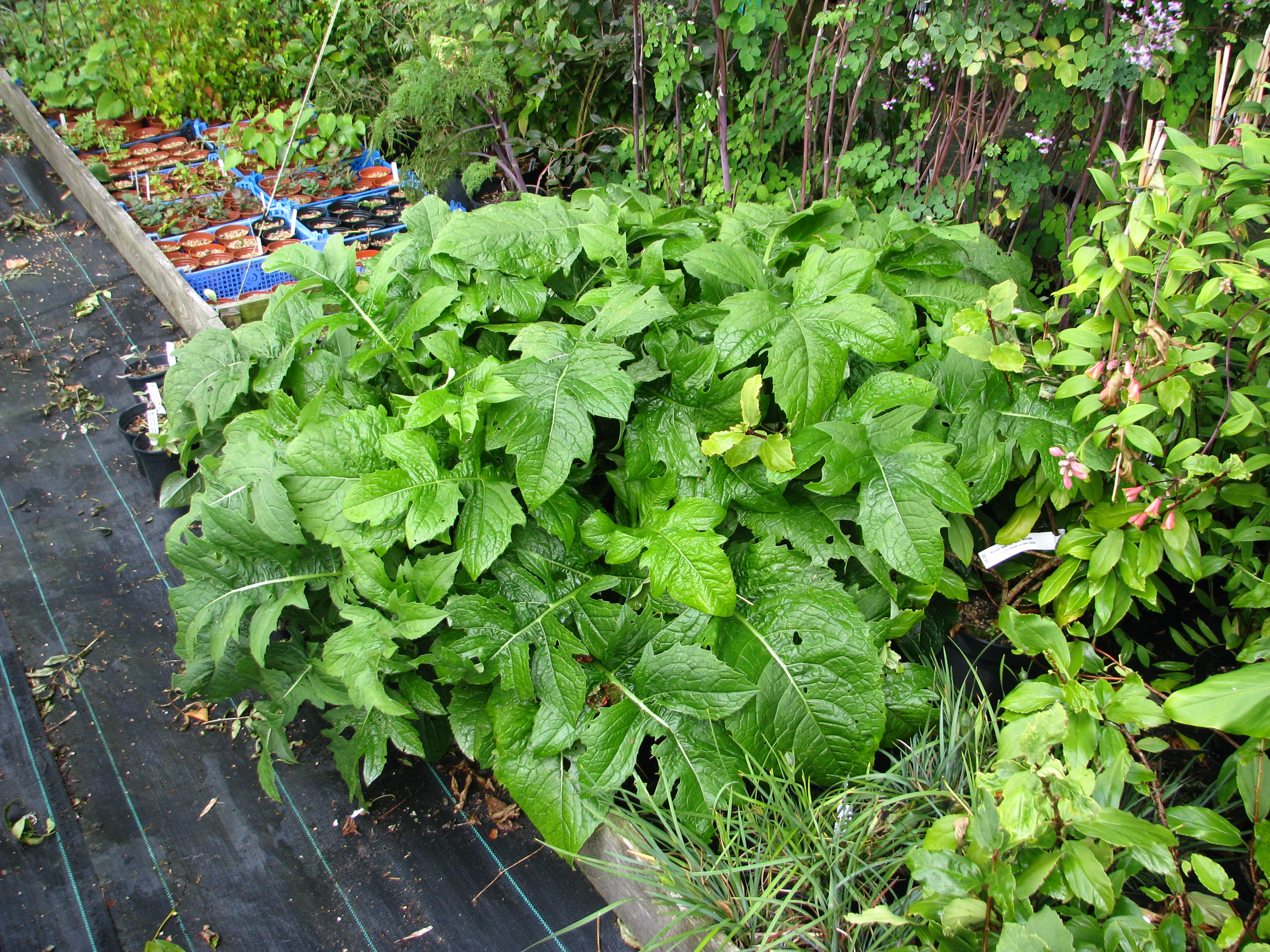
Basal leaves

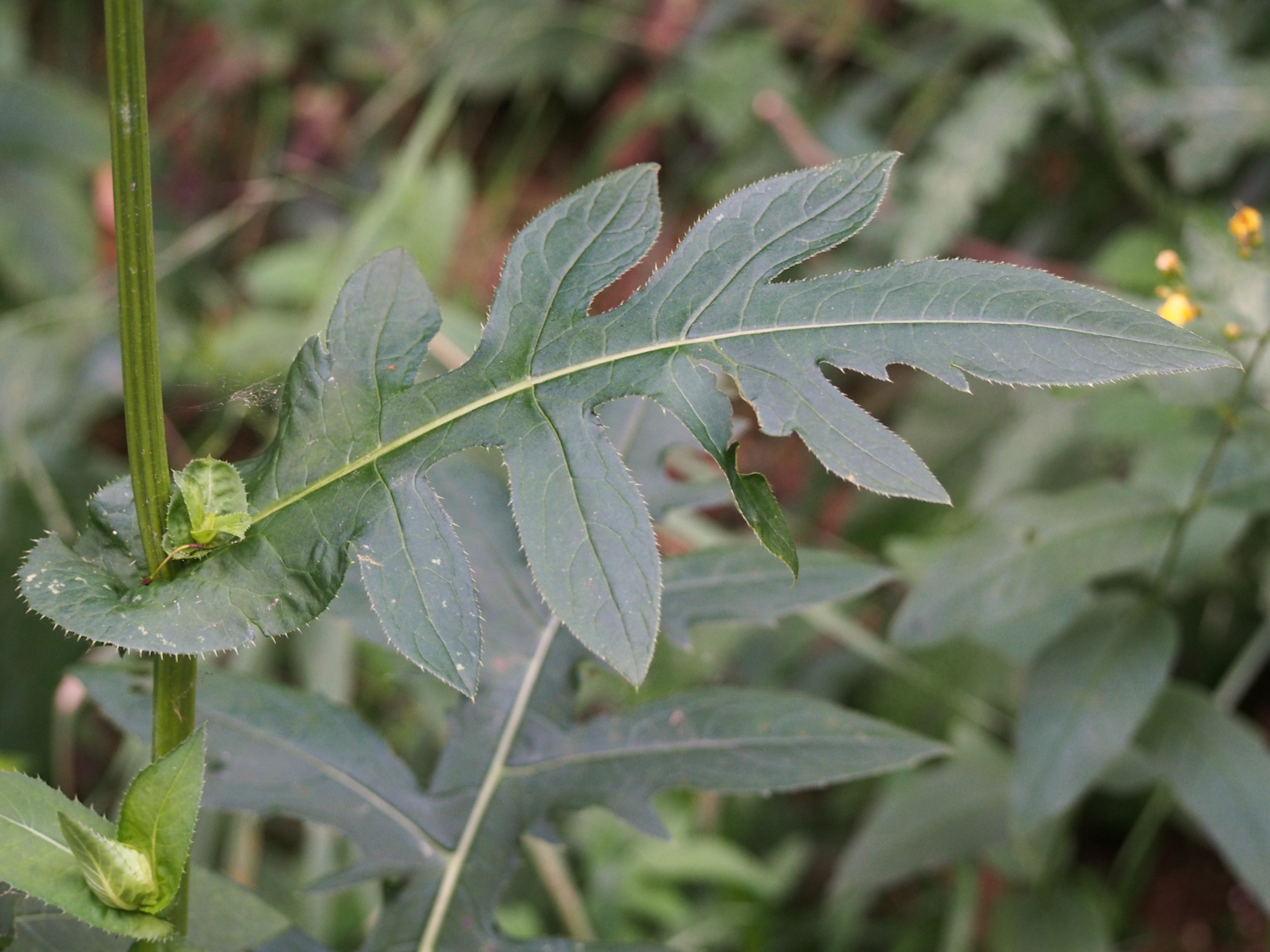
Stalk leaves

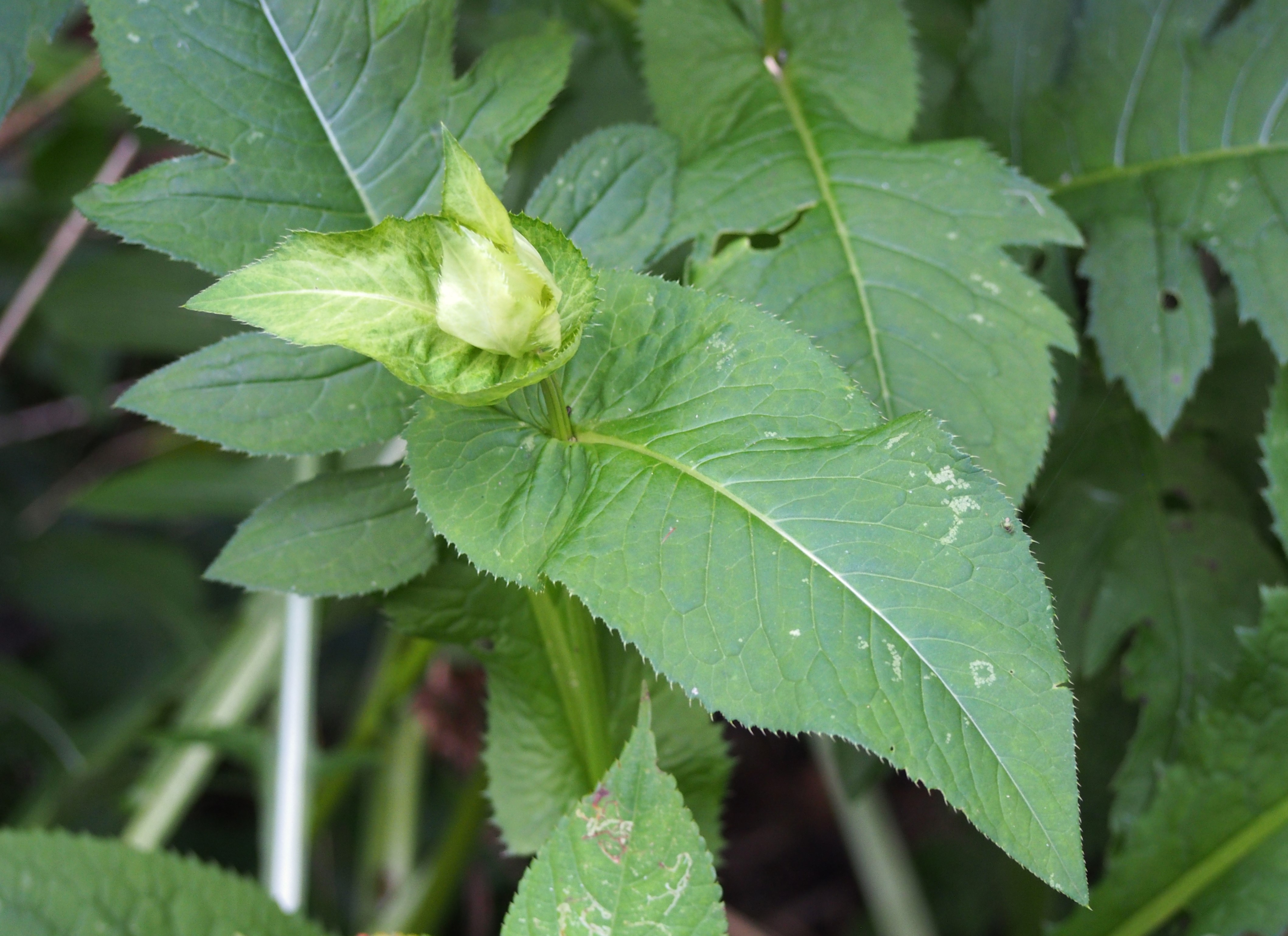
Bolting

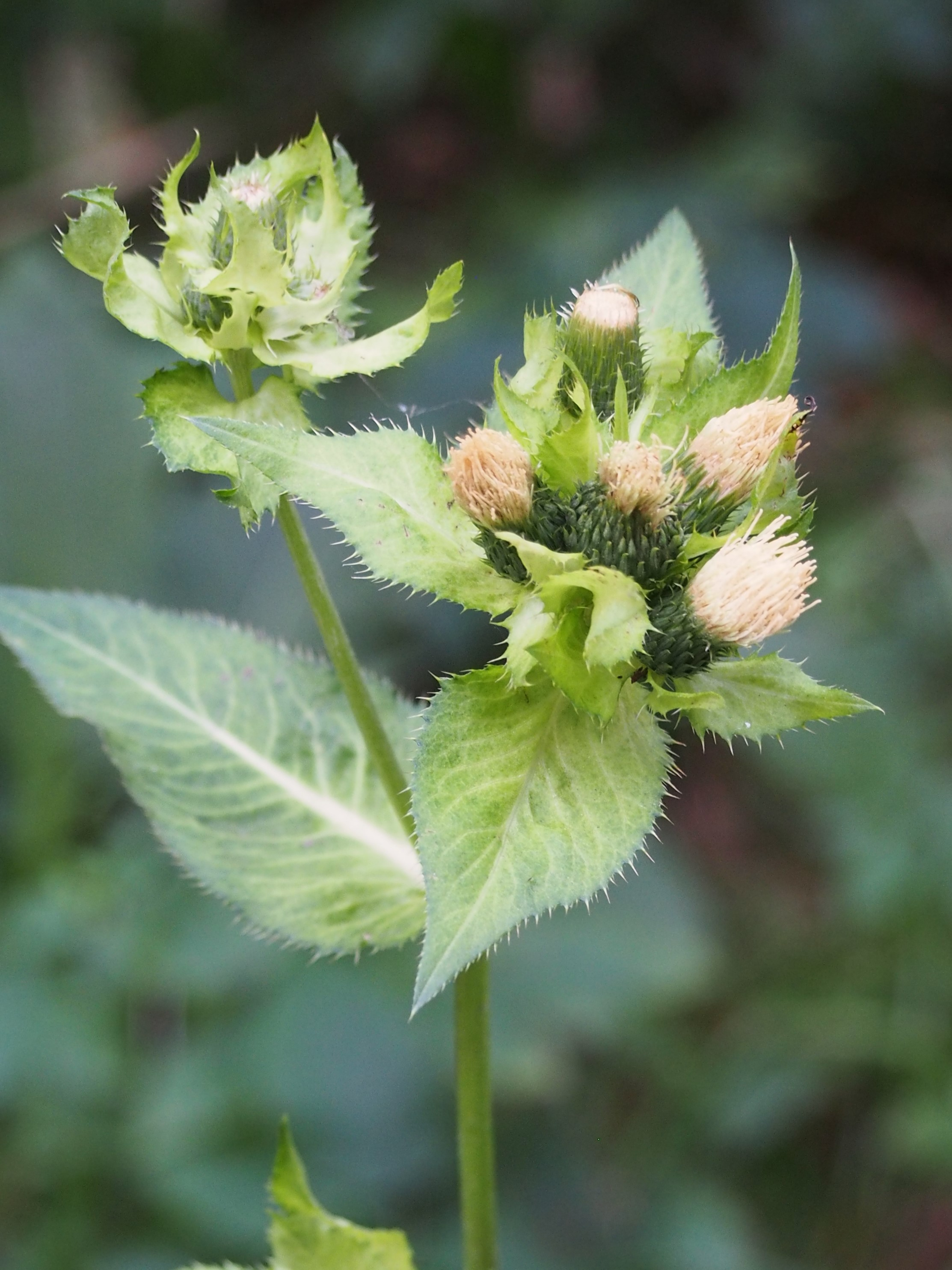
Flowerheads

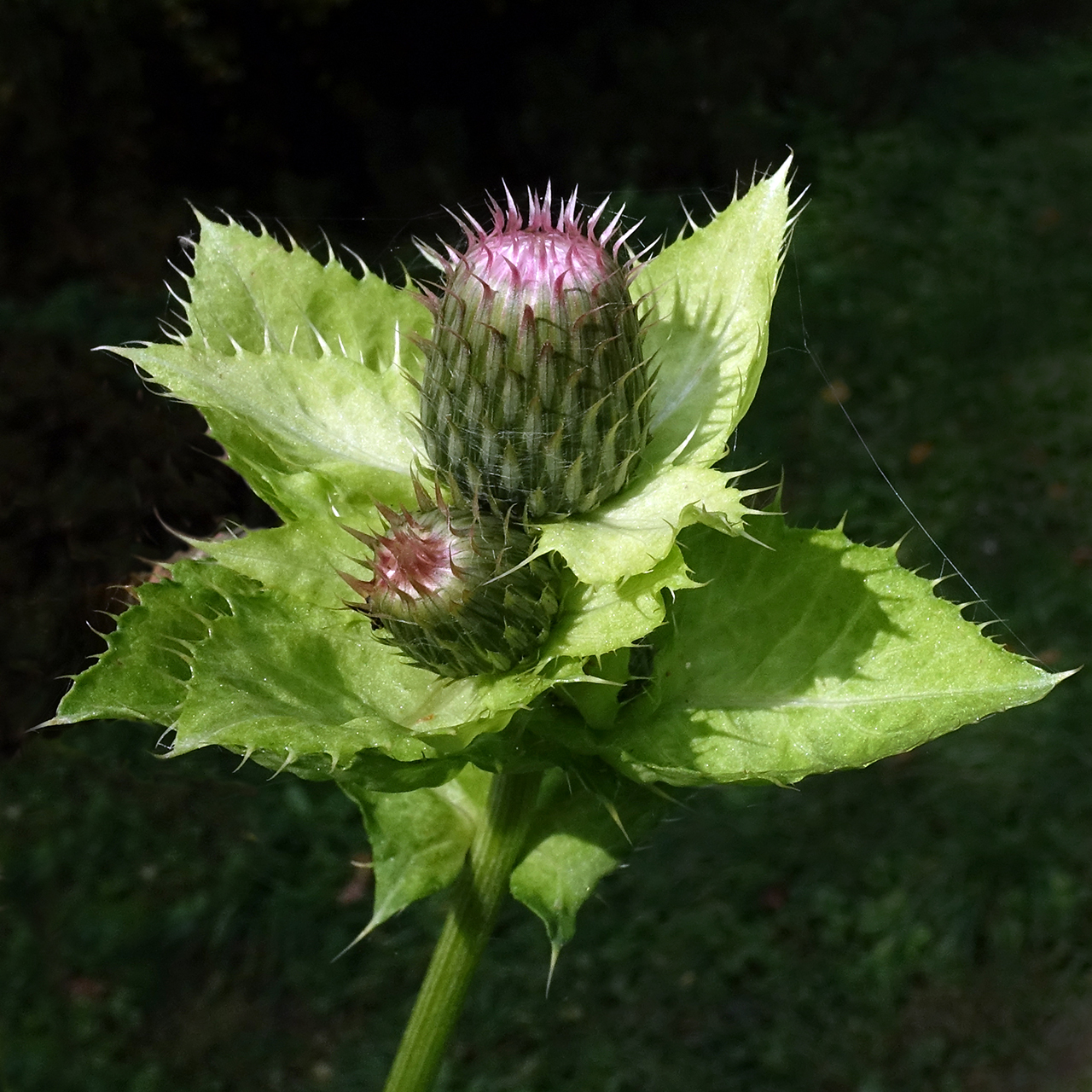
Involucre

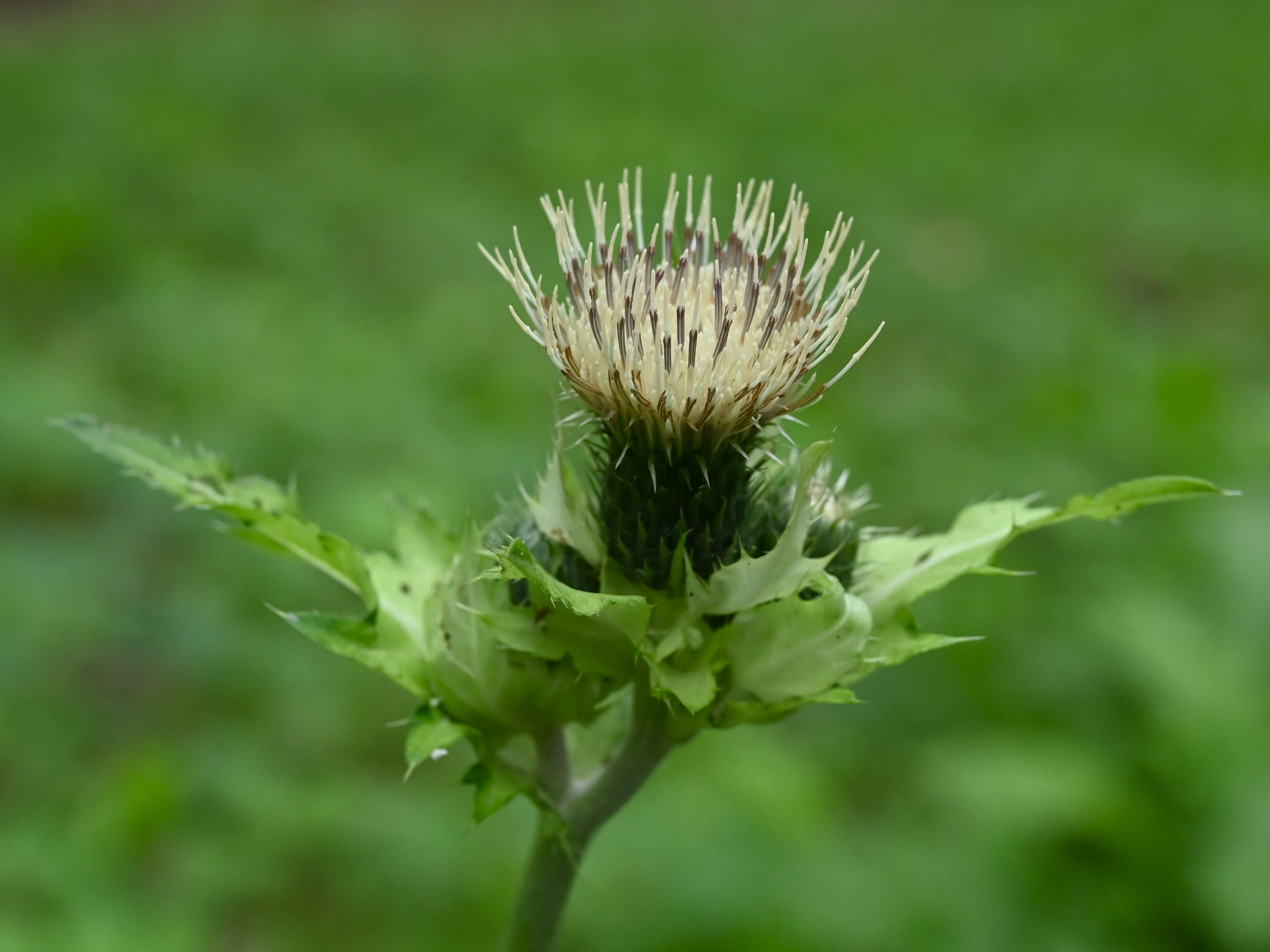
Blooming

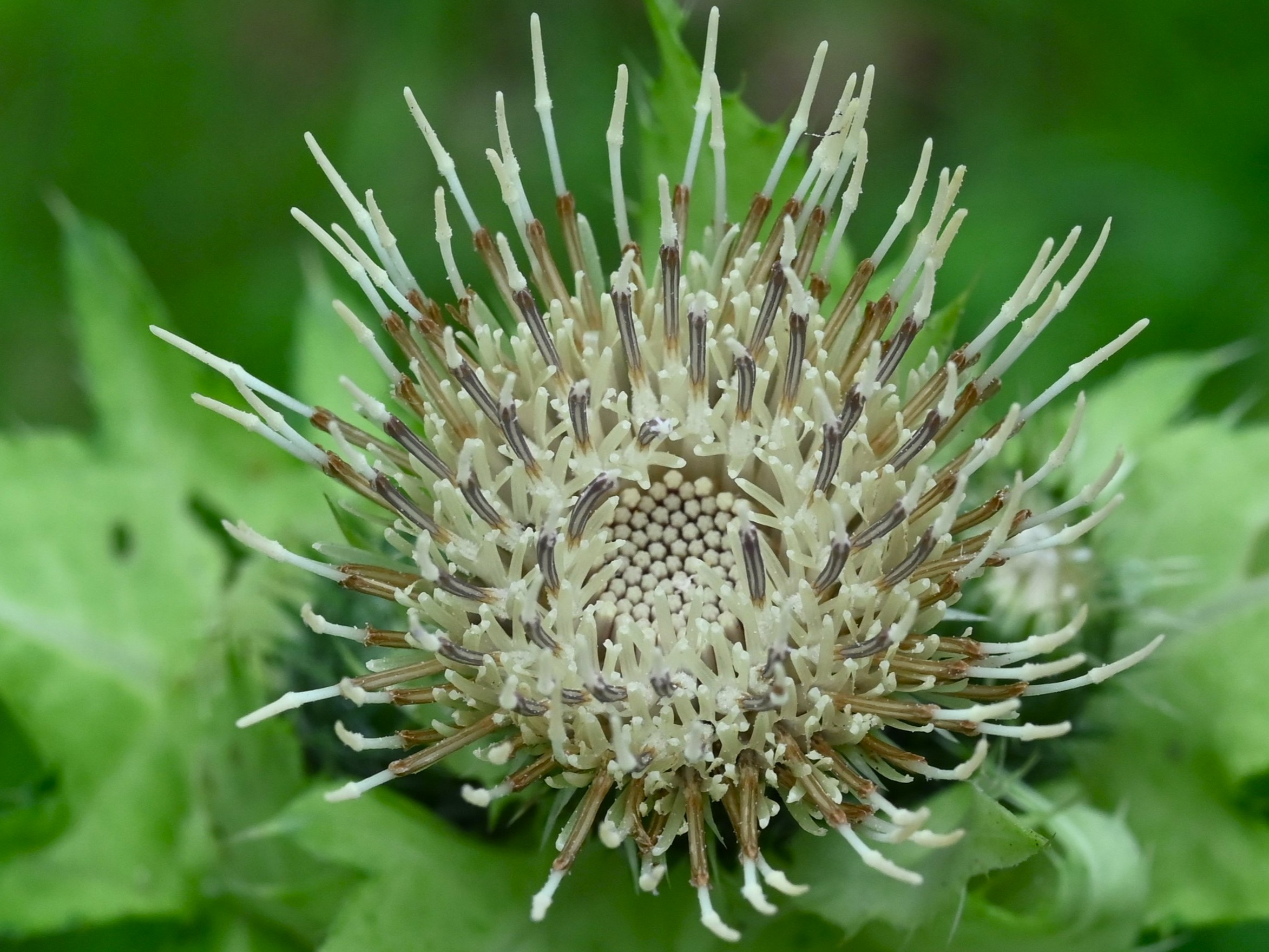
Flower

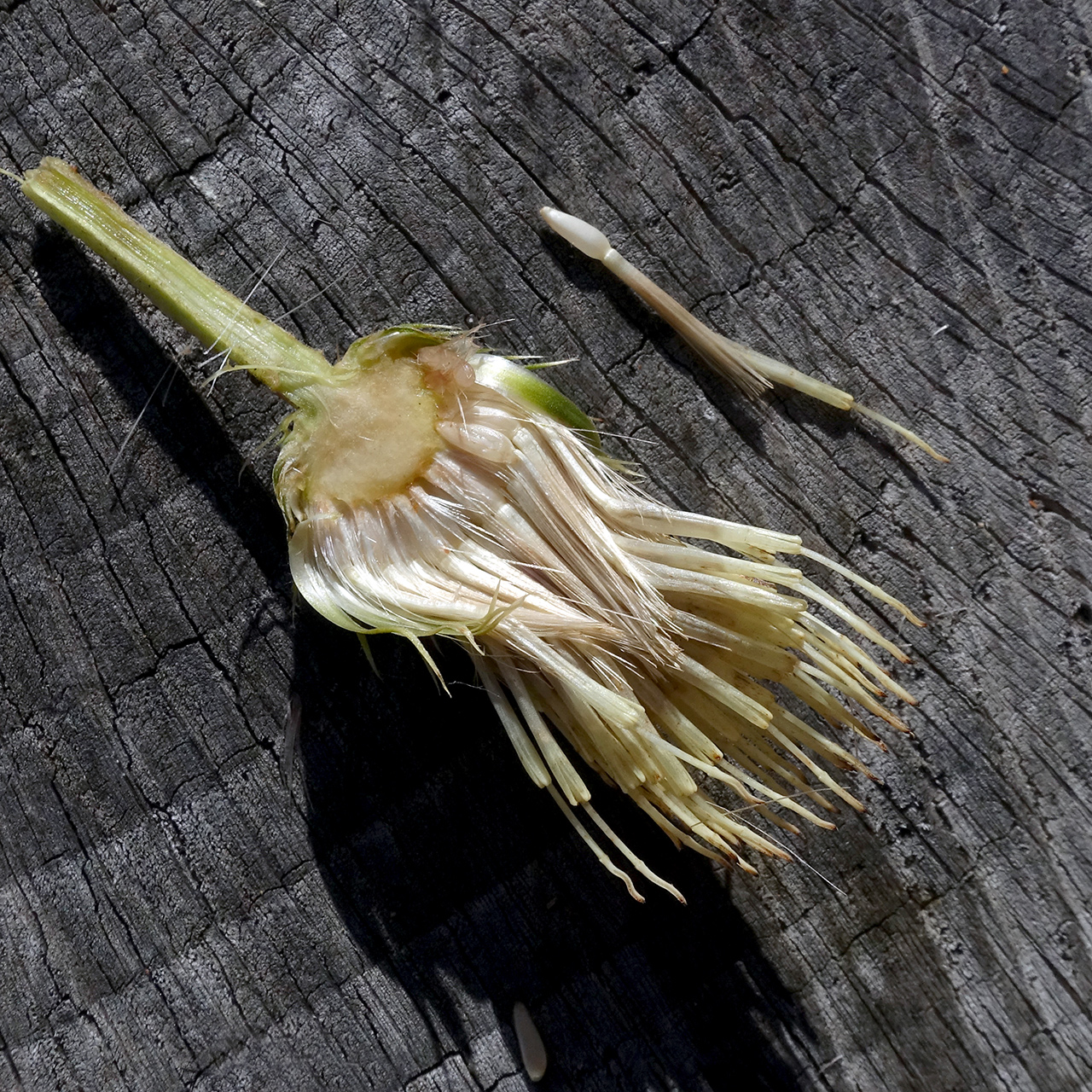
Flower (cross-section)
