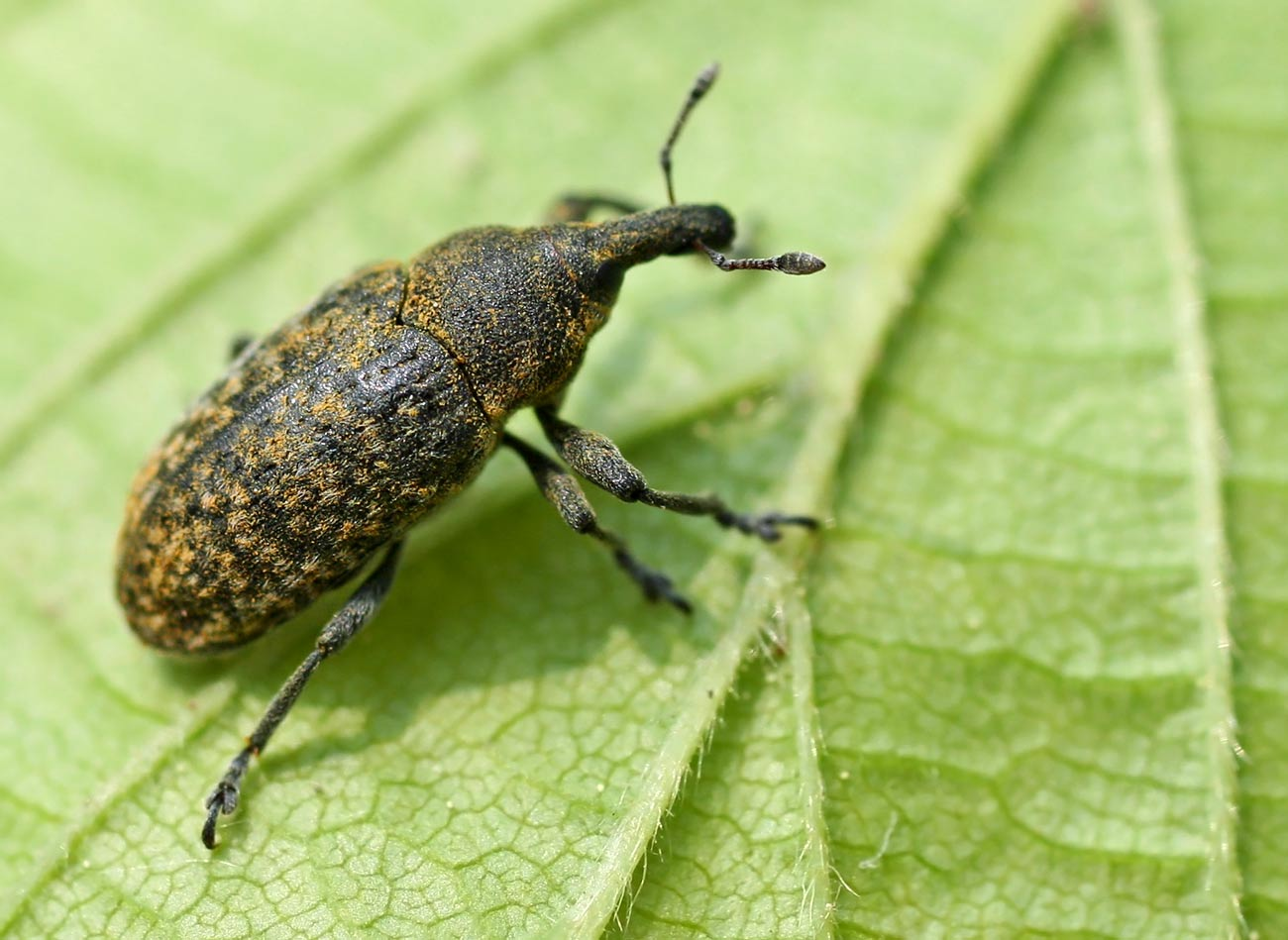

Scientific classification
- Kingdom: Animalia
- Phylum: Arthropoda
- Class: Insecta
- Order: Coleoptera
- Suborder: Polyphaga
- Infraorder: Cucujiformia
- Family: Curculionidae
- Genus: Larinus
- Species: L. planus

Binomial name
- Larinus planus (Fabricius, 1792)

= Larinus planus =

Species of beetle

Larinus planus is an insect of the Curculionidae ("true" weevil) family. They are oval shaped, dark brown or black, and about 5–10 millimetres (3/16–3/8 in) long. While native to Europe, it is also common in North America. It feeds on floral buds, primarily of thistles, with the larvae stage being the most destructive to them. In North America, it has been used as a biocontrol agent. It is also known as Larinus carlinae.

== Description ==
The adult weevil is mostly dark brown or black, but has red-brown antennae. It is about 5–10 millimetres (3/16–3/8 in) long and oval shaped. The wing covers have light colored mottled hairs on them and appear pock-marked. The nose is long and narrow, with a pronounced curvature.

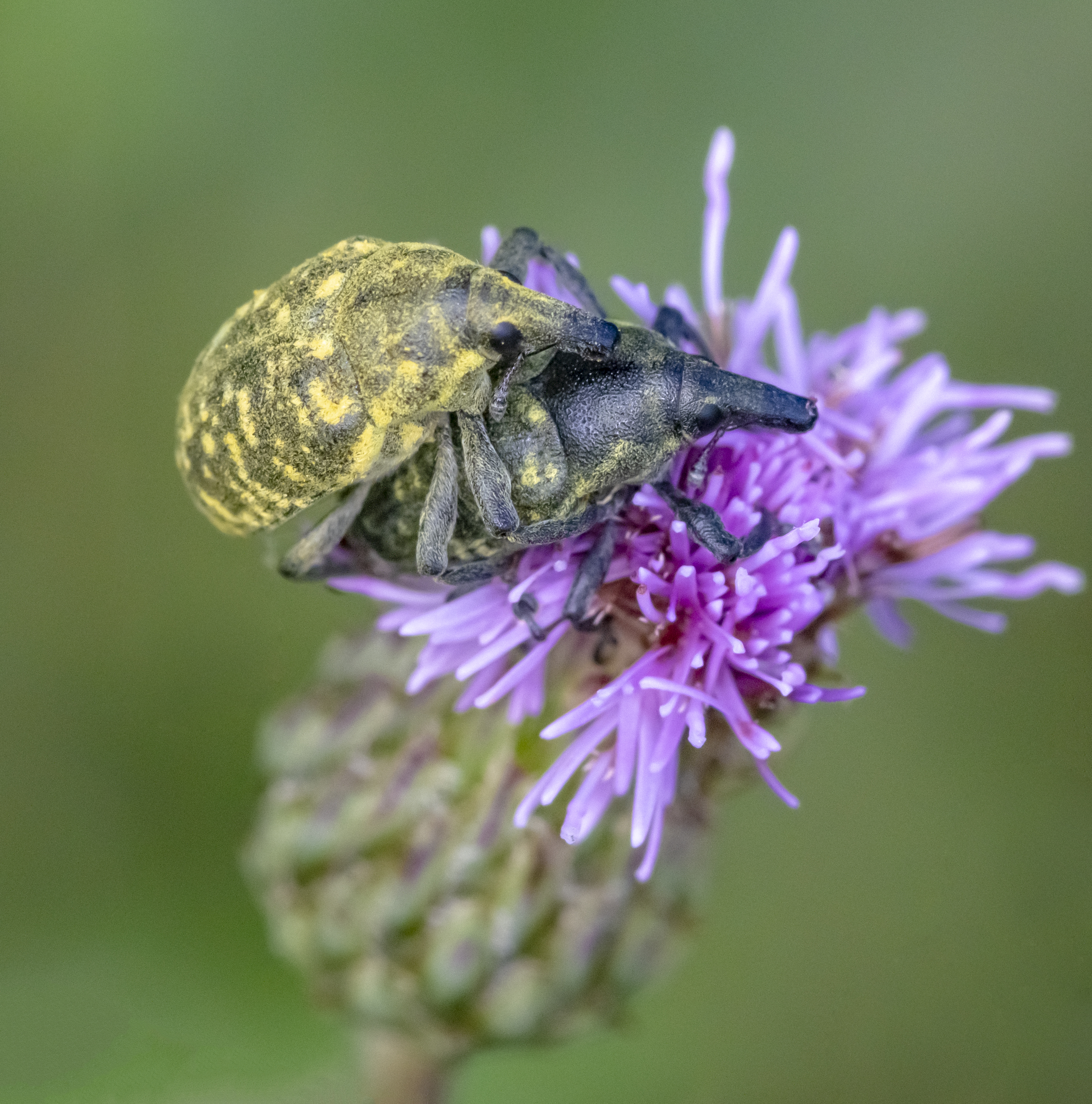
Canada Thistle Bud Weevils Mating

The eggs are black and appear the size of a "pin-prick." Once hatched, the larva has a segmented white body with a brown head, and is C-shaped.

== Distribution ==
This weevil is indigenous to southwest England, as well as Central and Eastern Europe.

It was accidentally introduced to Canada and the United States in the 1960s. The first published record is from Maryland in 1971. It is now widespread throughout North America.

== Biology ==
Adults emerge in the spring, and begin feeding on thistle buds. They require buds ranging in size from 5-7mm. The insects mate when the temperature is at least 22 °C (72 °F), which is usually about 14-16 days after they emerge. The female deposits a single egg in each floral bud, and then seals it. After hatching, the larva feeds on the floral bud it is hatched in. In doing so, it destroys about 95% of the seed contents. Another brood of adults emerges in late Autumn. These adults spend the winter in plant litter, to emerge in the spring.

Larinus planus prefers dryer ranges, but can also adapt to wetter locations. It does well in sunny areas with well drained soils.

== Use as a biocontrol agent ==
In Canada, it has been used as an agent of biological pest control against the noxious weed Canada thistle (Cirsium arvense). It was subsequently evaluated in the United States as a biocontrol agent and distributed across a range of the Great Plains in the western United States.

In 2000, it was found feeding on Cirsium undulatum var. tracyi, a sparsely distributed thistle native to western Colorado and eastern Utah. Subsequent research determined that the weevil reduced seed production of the native thistle. It has also been found to have an adverse effect on the native and threatened Cirsium pitcheri.
