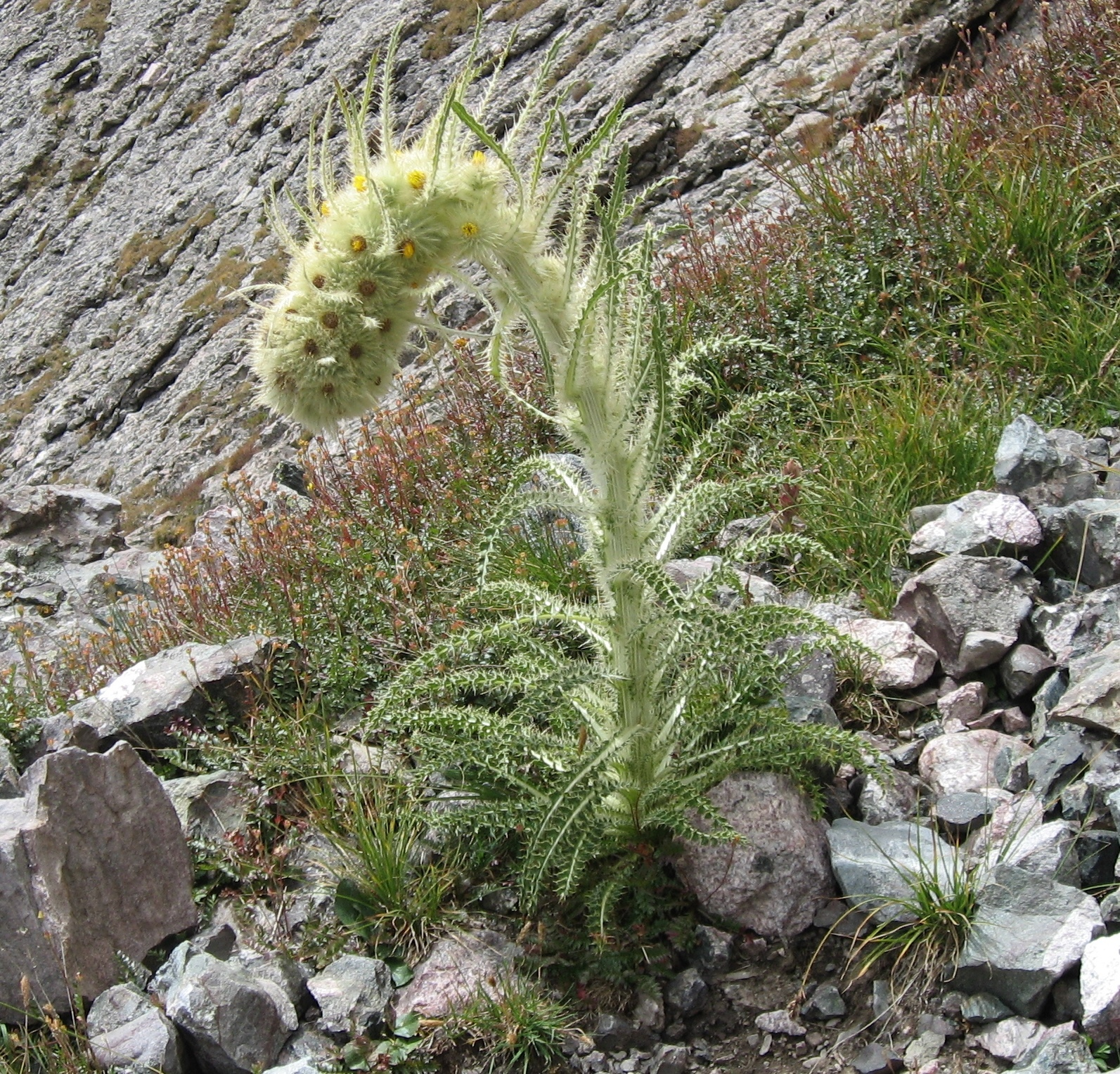

Conservation status
- Vulnerable (NatureServe)

Scientific classification
- Kingdom: Plantae
- Clade: Tracheophytes
- Clade: Angiosperms
- Clade: Eudicots
- Clade: Asterids
- Order: Asterales
- Family: Asteraceae
- Genus: Cirsium
- Species: C. funkiae

Binomial name
- Cirsium funkiae Ackerf.

= Cirsium funkiae =

Funky thistle

Species of thistle

Cirsium funkiae, the funky thistle or Funk's thistle, is a species of thistle found in the United States. It was first described by American botanist Jennifer Ackerfield in 2022.

The funky thistle's common name refers to the plant's "funky" appearance, with a nodding woolly flower head, and additionally honors Ackerfield's mentor Vicki Funk, who was also described as funky. The funky thistle can be differentiated from the similar looking mountain thistle Cirsium scopulorum by the coloration of the style branches and corolla, and the nodding flowerhead that the funky thistle exhibits.

== Taxonomy ==
Cirsium funkiae was discerned as a separate species by Jennifer Ackerfield, head curator at the Denver Botanic Gardens. Ackerfield was cautious not to use the term "discovered", cautious that it was possible that local Indigenous peoples were already aware of the species' distinct identity prior to her description. Ackerfield had begun studying the thistles in 2016 as a part of her PhD studies. Jared Polis, Governor of Colorado, would later highlight the thistle's discovery on Twitter. The funky thistle was the first described living organism in the year of 2022 found in the Rocky Mountain Region.

C. funkiae was formerly considered for more than 150 years as part of C. scopulorum, the mountain thistle. Specimens of both the funky and mountain thistle would be labeled under the same designation until it was separated. Through molecular, geographic, and morphological analysis, it was deemed that the mountaintop thistle C. eatonii was polyphyletic and therefore should be split. The species complex that was Cirsium eatonii was split in 2020, re-instating the former taxa C. clokeyi, C. murdockii, C. peckii, and C. tweedyi, as well as creating the taxa C. harrisonii and C. viperinum. In addition, C. eatonii var. eriocephalum was additionally polyphyletic, and renamed Cirsium scopulorum. The original description for scopulorum described a "yellow corolla", but was in the geographic region of the pale purple variety. Additional notes stated that the flowers were possibly too young and thus unable to tell the color of the corolla in the first place. The pale purple variety thus received the designation of scopulorum, leaving the yellow variety undescribed. Five species were separated from the former C. scopulorum complex. Cirsium culebraensis, C. funkiae, C. griseum, C. hesperium, and C. scopulorum. Two species, C. funkiae and C. culebraensis. Discoveries of plants such as C. funkiae can help researchers determine climate change-induced effects on species distribution and interaction.

The holotype specimen is housed in the Kathryn Kalmbach Herbarium at Denver Botanic Gardens. It was selected to be the institution's 100,000th accession into the natural history collections on March 7, 2023.

== Description ==
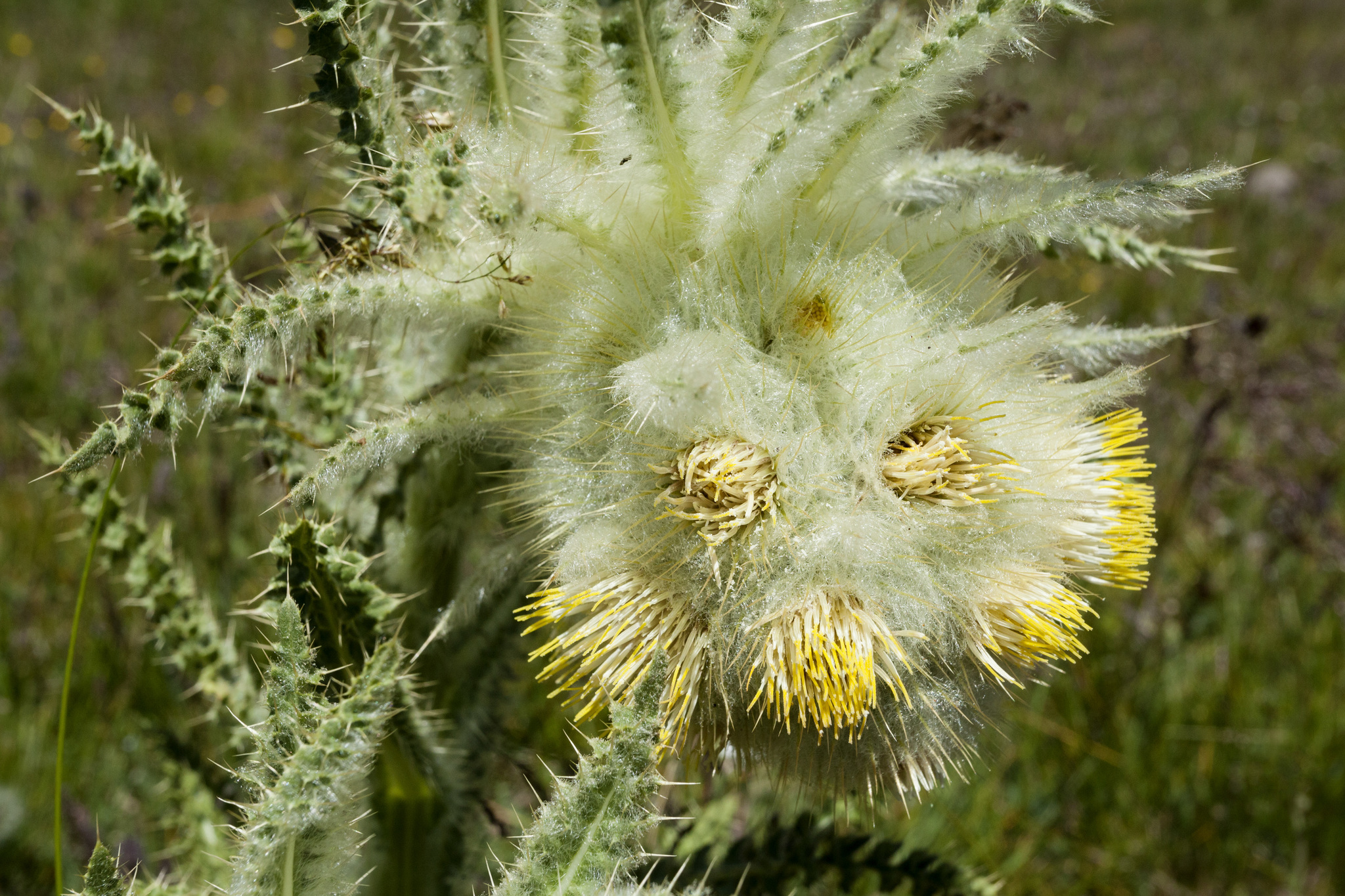
Closeup of the funky thistle's flowers

The funky thistle is a hairy perennial herb that grows up to 3 feet (0.91 m) in height. The plant has yellow branches with pale yellow flowers that turn brown with age that grow in fuzzy clusters. The leaves are oblong or narrowly elliptic and undulate. The leaves are pinnately divided and are 8–25 centimetres (3.1–9.8 in) in length and 1.5–3.5 centimetres (0.59–1.38 in) in width. The leaves range from smooth to hairy in texture. The seeds are dark brown or grayish brown in color, and are 4–6 millimetres (0.16–0.24 in) in length. It flowers from mid-July until late-August, the plant begins to fruit from mid-August to early September. Jennifer Ackerfield, who described it, said it was the "funkiest of all new thistles".

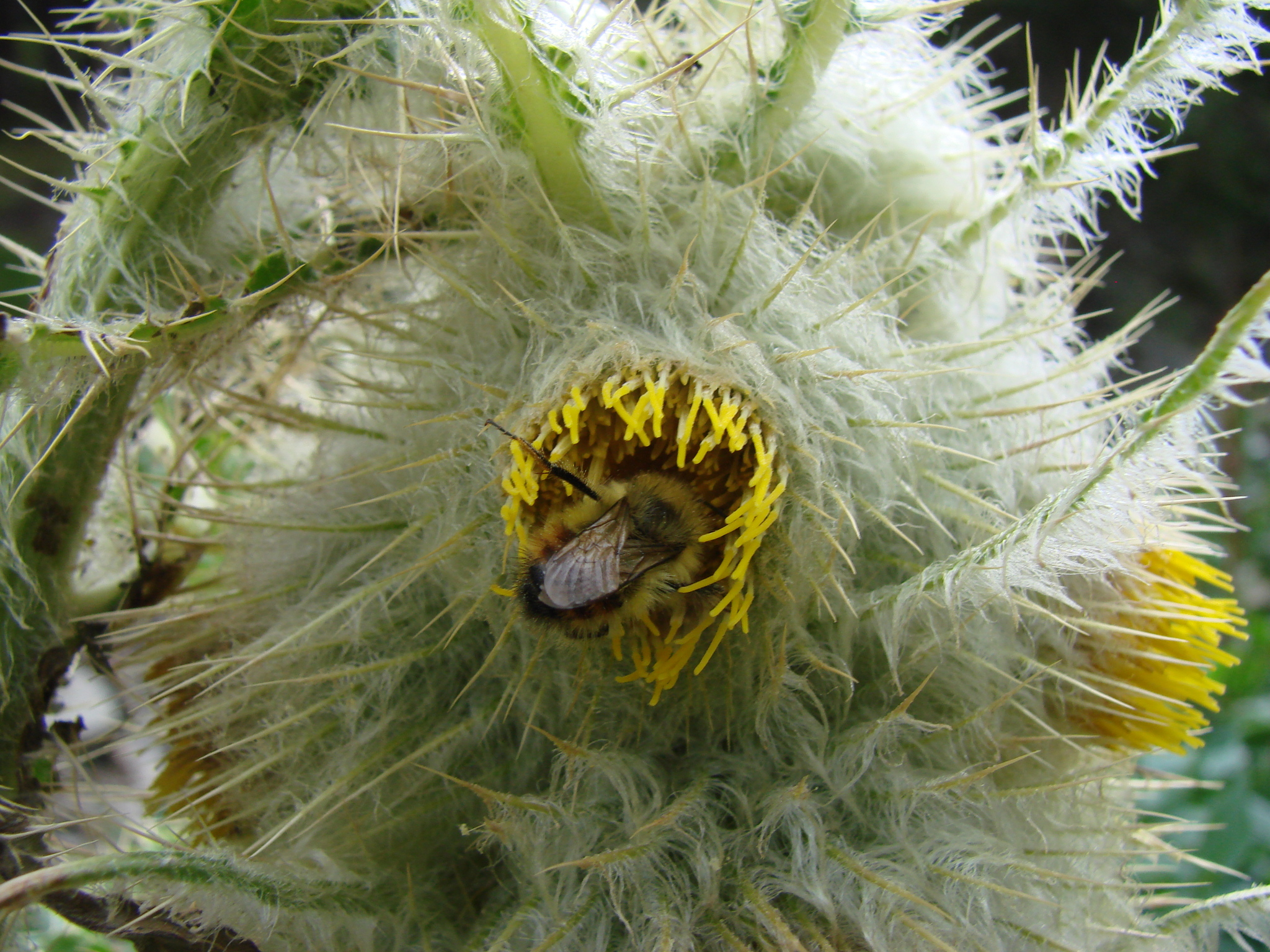
A bumblebee nestled in one of the funky thistle's flowerheads

Ackerfield described the coloration of the style branches, corolla, and the head position (whether erect or nodding), as the best characteristics toward identifying the alpine thistles in the Southern Rocky Mountains. The style branches are yellow in color. The corolla is pale yellow in color, turning brown as it ages. The anther tube is white in color, alternatively pale yellow with brown stripes. The flower head grows in a nodding, terminal cluster. The thistle differs from the similar Cirsium scopulorum in its style branches being yellow rather than white, pale pink, or purple, but similar due to their nodding terminal arrangement of the heads.

The large plants serve as food sources for a variety of pollinators in its habitat. The plant is visited by bumblebees (Bombus sp.), who often overnight in the fuzzy flowerheads to stay warm. The leaves are often foraged by the American pika (Ochotona princeps) during the months of August and September.

== Range ==
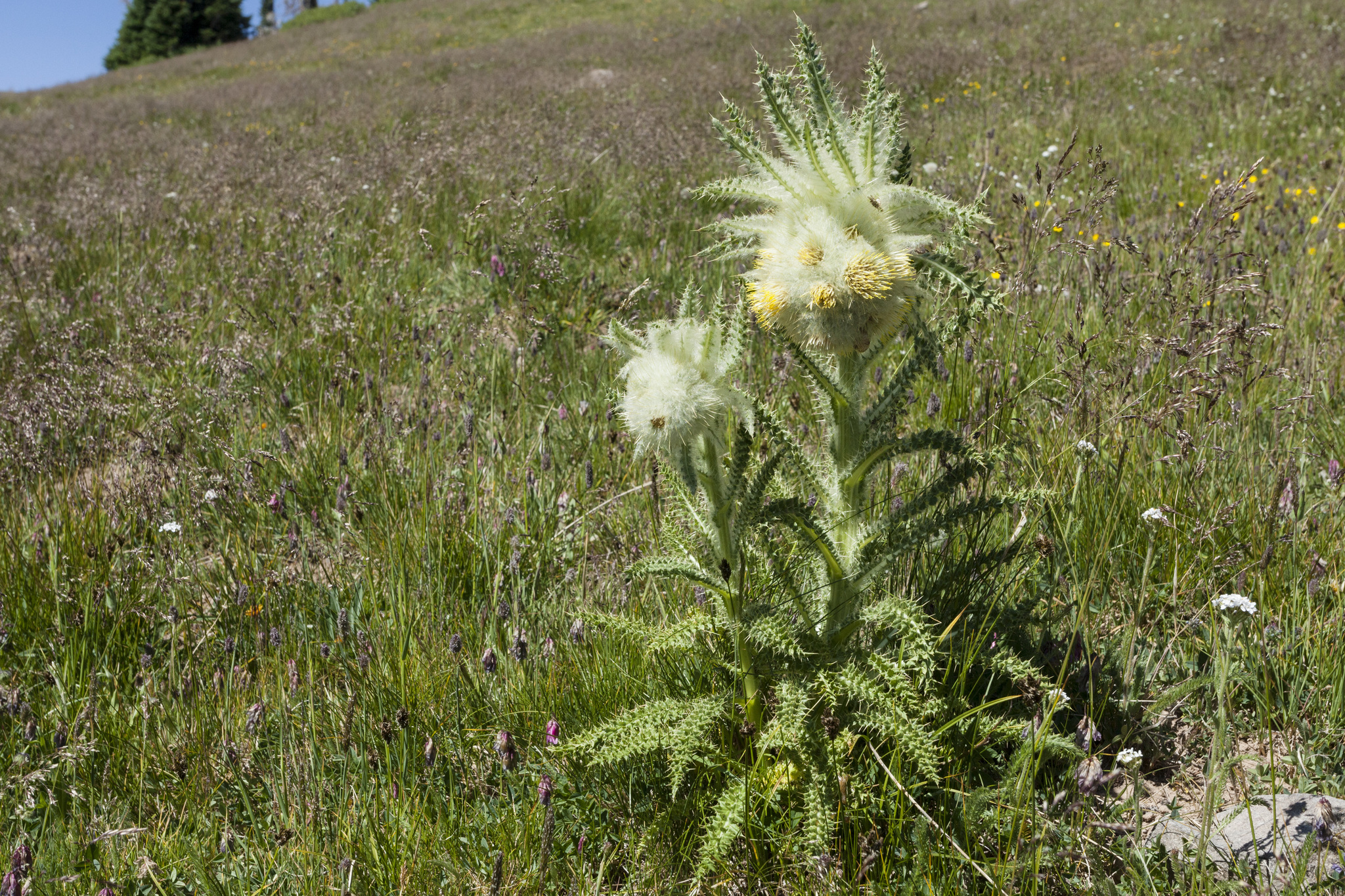
The funky thistle in its native habitat

The type specimen was collected at the base of Mount Sherman in Pike National Forest. The funky thistle is found on the mountaintops on the Sangre de Cristo Range, Mosquito Range, and Tenmile Range in central and southern Colorado. Its range extends as far north as Breckenridge, Colorado, and as far south as Santa Fe, New Mexico, where it exists as an isolated population.

=== Habitat ===
The plant grows in higher elevations above the tree line. among spruce and fir forests and alpine tundra, although it is mainly grows in alpine meadows, boulder fields, or rocky scree slopes. At lower elevations it grows in association with Bistorta bistortoides, Picea engelmannii, Potentilla pulcherrima, and Sibbaldia procumbens. In rocky slopes and meadows it grows in association with: Cirsium griseum, Carex scopulorum, Castilleja miniata, Castilleja occidentalis, Claytonia megarhiza, Geum rossii, Senecio atratus, Senecio fremontii, Polemonium confertum, and Trifolium dasyphyllum. In its highest locations on scree slopes, it is often the only species of plant found, or can be found associated with Senecio soldanella. One specimen was growing in a rocky tundra environment alongside Cerastium beeringianum, Heuchera parviflora, Pentaphylloides floribunda, and Trifolium dasyphyllum.

== Conservation ==
The funky thistle is safe from some threats due a combination of its alpine distribution which make access difficult and its location primarily in US federally owned land. The populations are currently thought to be stable. The thistle can be threatened by members of the public who assume the thistle is an invasive species and thus uproot and leave it on the side of hiking trails.

== Etymology ==
The specific epithet honors Vicki Funk, who died in 2019 just before the study was completed, and was Jennifer Ackerfield's mentor. The name was chosen because of her work in the field of Compositae research at the Smithsonian Institution and to highlight her position of leadership in the study. Funk was known for having a funky personality, and Ackerfield remarked that Funk would have a special tune that she would sing when she was pricked by a thistle she was collecting, "Ooh Eeh Ooh Ah Aah Ting Tang Walla Walla Bing Bang" (Ross Bagdasarian's "Witch Doctor"), and that she wanted to honor the "funkiest of all thistles". Ackerfield described the plant's dense mass of noddy wooly heads as "funky indeed".
