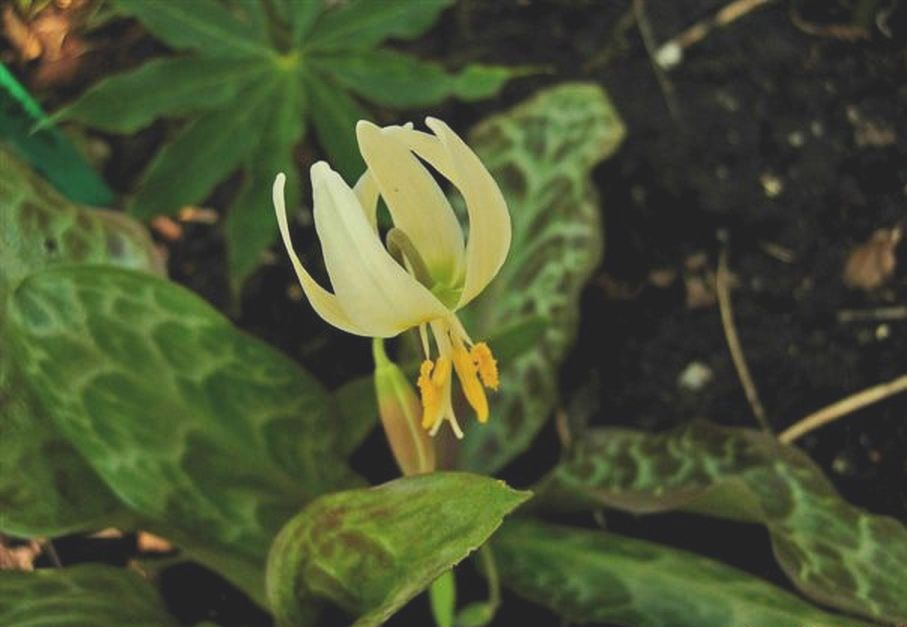

Scientific classification
- Kingdom: Plantae
- Clade: Tracheophytes
- Clade: Angiosperms
- Clade: Monocots
- Order: Liliales
- Family: Liliaceae
- Subfamily: Lilioideae
- Tribe: Lilieae
- Genus: Erythronium
- Species: E. citrinum

Binomial name
- Erythronium citrinum S.Wats.

= Erythronium citrinum =

Species of flowering plant

Erythronium citrinum, also known as citrus fawn lily or cream fawn lily, is a member of the lily family that is endemic to the Klamath Mountains. It is found in southwest Oregon and adjacent northwest California. The genus Erythronium, which can be found across northern North America, Europe and Asia, is most diverse in California, which is home to fifteen of about twenty-eight members of the genus.

== Distribution and habitat ==
Erythronium citrinum grows in open woods and shrubby slopes, and is more or less confined to serpentine soils. It blooms in early spring and can sometimes be seen blooming in profusion.

== Description ==
The flowers of Erythronium citrinum are borne on stems that are six to eight inches tall. It has a pair of broad mottled leaves up to about six inches long. The stigma is very shallowly three lobed, and its anthers are white.

It grows in the vicinity of Erythronium oregonum, Erythronium howellii, and Erythronium hendersonii. The flower of cream fawn lily is creamy-white with a yellow center. The tips of the tepals turn pinkish as they age. The very similar E. howellii is more restricted in its range and can be distinguished by its lacking of nectariferous appendages on the bases of the inner petals. E. hendersonii, which has a distribution that ends just at the northern boundary of the cream fawn lily, is fairly similar, but is easily distinguished by its purple flowers. E. oregonum, which is wide ranging and fairly abundant in southwest Oregon can be distinguished by its deeply divided three-lobed stigma (whereas E. citrinum is narrowly divided).

== General references ==
1. Eastwood, Donald C. Rare and Endangered Plants of Oregon. Beautiful America, 1990
2. My Erythronium "Big Year"
