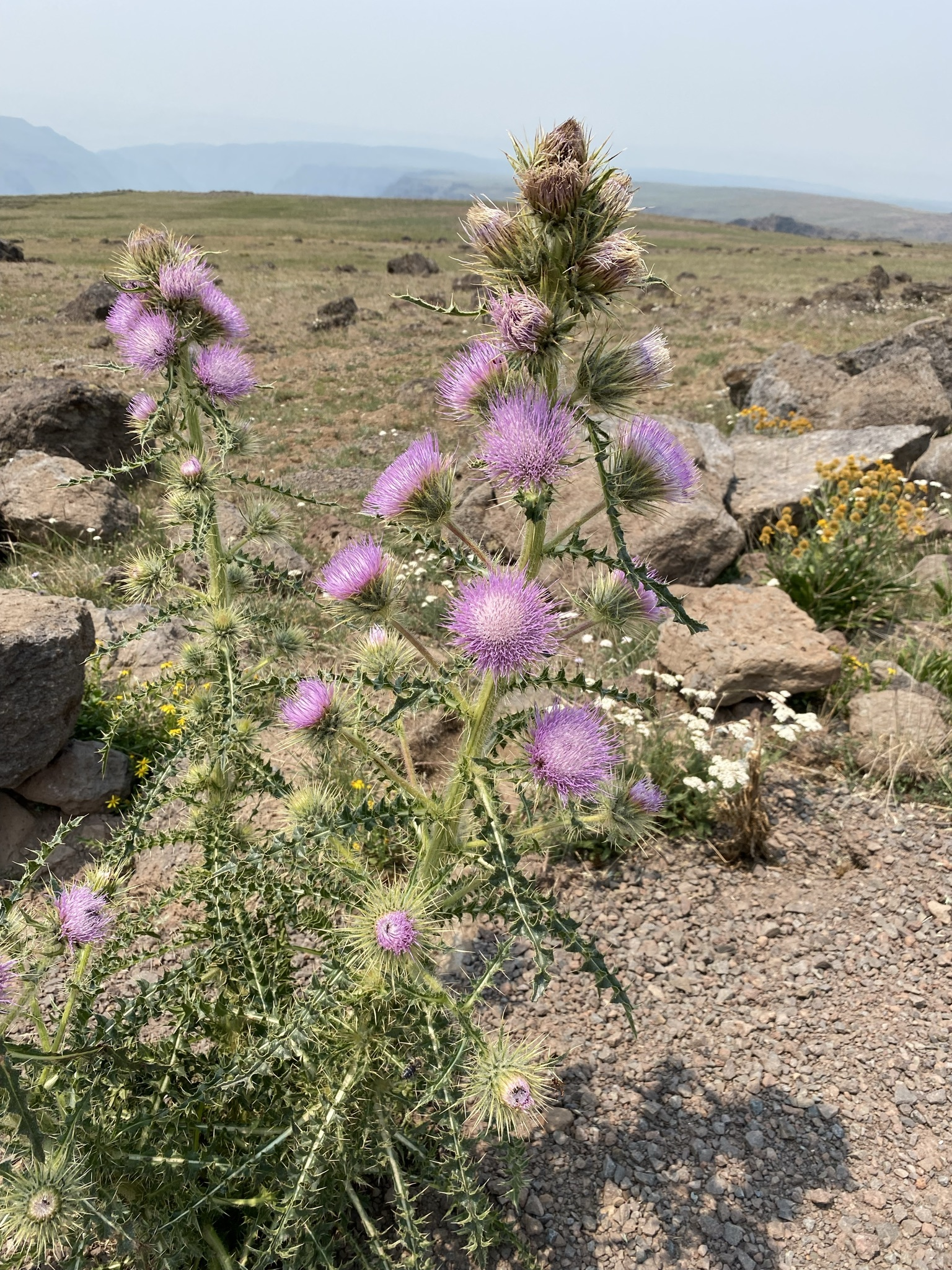

Scientific classification
- Kingdom: Plantae
- Clade: Tracheophytes
- Clade: Angiosperms
- Clade: Eudicots
- Clade: Asterids
- Order: Asterales
- Family: Asteraceae
- Genus: Cirsium
- Species: C. peckii

Binomial name
- Cirsium peckii L.F.Hend.

Synonyms
- Cirsium eatonii var. peckii

= Cirsium peckii =

Species of thistle

Cirsium peckii, the Steens Mountain thistle, is a very spiny and prickly perennial plant in the family Asteraceae that grows in the Great Basin of the western United States.

== Growth pattern ==
It is a perennial plant that grows with a single nonbranching erect stem from 1 to 4 feet (0.30 to 1.22 m) tall, covered with sharp stiff hairs.

== Leaves and stems ==
Leaves are lanceolate and deeply divided, with sharp, pointed, yellow needle-like teeth on the points of lobes, and are either hairless or have sparse hairs on the midrib. The lower leaves are 6 to 8 inches (15 to 20 cm) long.

== Inflorescence and fruit ==
Light lavender heads of flowers are clustered at the base of the leaves along the upper part of the stem.

It flowers from June to August.

== Range and habitat ==
It grows from 6,500 to 9,700 feet (2,000 to 3,000 m) on dry slopes and rocky places in sagebrush steppe communities of the Great Basin, to southern Oregon where it can be found on Steens Mountain.

== Etymology ==
Morton Peck was a 20th-century professor of botany at Willamette University and author of A Manual of the Higher Plants of Oregon.
