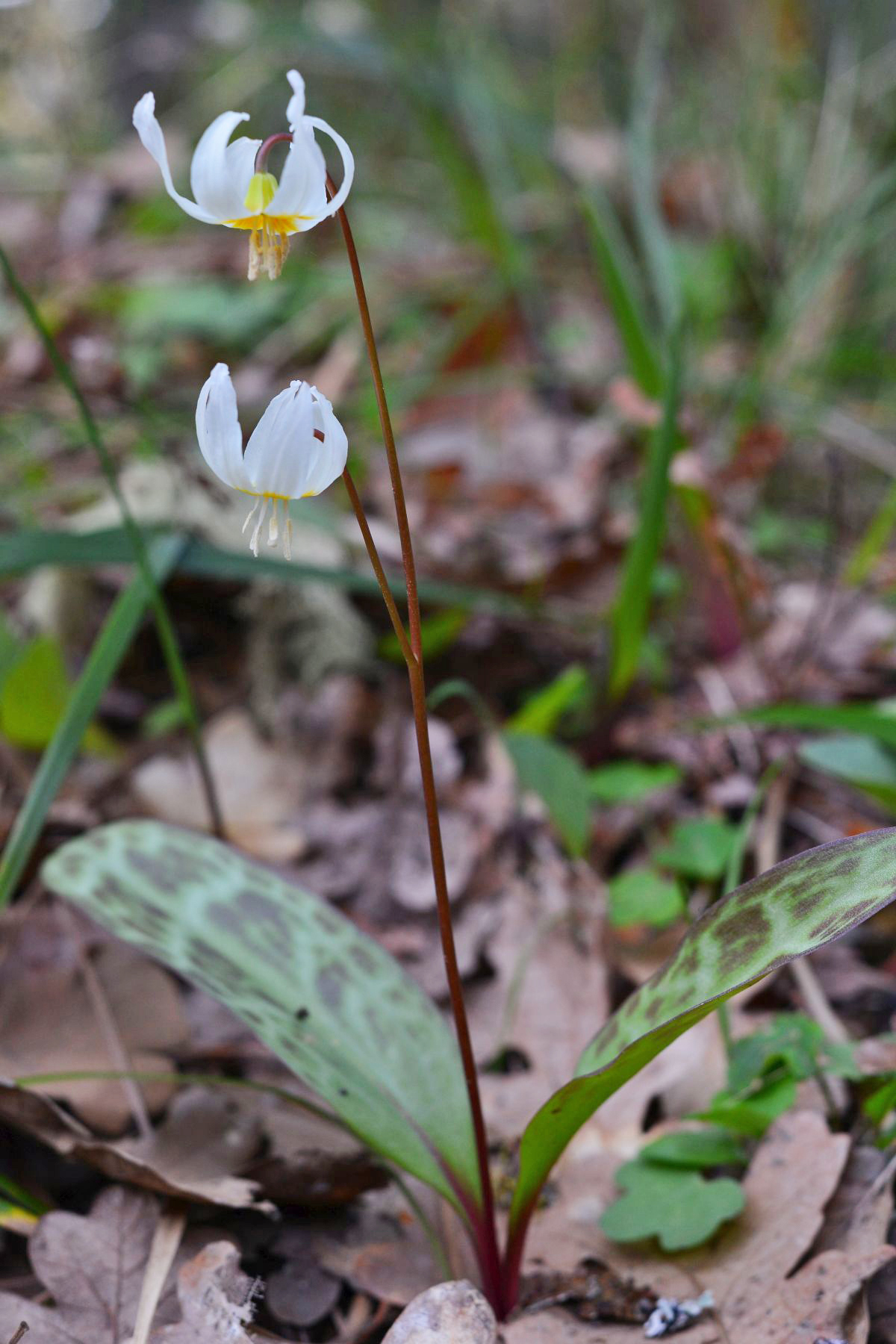

Conservation status
- Vulnerable (NatureServe)

Scientific classification
- Kingdom: Plantae
- Clade: Tracheophytes
- Clade: Angiosperms
- Clade: Monocots
- Order: Liliales
- Family: Liliaceae
- Subfamily: Lilioideae
- Tribe: Lilieae
- Genus: Erythronium
- Species: E. howellii

Binomial name
- Erythronium howellii S.Watson

= Erythronium howellii =

Howell's fawn lily

Species of flowering plant

Erythronium howellii, or Howell's fawn lily, is a flowering plant in the lily family Liliaceae. It is endemic to the Klamath Mountains of southwestern Oregon and northwestern California. Taxonomic authorities are divided on whether E. howellii is a distinct species from the morphologically similar E. citrinum.

== Description ==
Like other species in its genus, E. howellii is a geophyte, growing from an underground bulb. It sends up a single basal leaf in years when the plant does not flower and two basal leaves in flowering years. Leaves are lanceolate and green, mottled with brownish streaks. Plants bear 1–3 flowers and the end of a 10–25 cm long scape that emerges from between the basal leaves. The flowers are small, with six white tepals 20–45 mm in length that fade to pink as the flower ages, especially at the tips. Near the center of the flower, there is a broad yellow-orange spot. The stamens are white, held on thin filaments. Like E. citrinum, flowers of E. howellii have very short stigma lobes, in contrast to E. oreganum flowers that three have large, recurved stigma lobes.

The only morphological difference that distinguishes E. howellii from E. citrinum, another closely-related species endemic to the Siskiyous, is the shape of the tepal base. On E. citrinum, the tepals have bulges near the base, called auricles or appendages; the tepals of E. howellii are narrower and lack auricles.

== Taxonomy ==
The species epithet howellii refers to the self-taught botanist Thomas J. Howell, who collected the type specimen of Erythronium howellii in April of 1887 near Waldo, Oregon. Howell also collected the type specimen for the closely-related and morphologically-similar E. citrinum the same month and in the same county. Sereno Watson formally described both species in 1887.

Local taxonomic authorities, including the Oregon Flora and The Jepson Manual, consider A. howellii a synonym of E. citrinum var. citrinum. The Flora of North America similarly considers E. howellii a synonym of E. citrinum, with no recognized varieties. In contrast, Plants of the World Online continues recognizing E. howellii as a distinct species.

Hybrids between E. citrinum and E. howellii have been documented.

== Distribution and habitat ==
Erythronium howellii grows in sites with serpentine soil in open woods and along the edges of forests. The species was first collected in Josephine County, Oregon, where it grows from the southern end of the Illinois River Valley to the foothills of the Siskiyou Mountains, and its presence is well-documented there. There are also reports of E. howellii in Siskiyou, Trinity, and Del Norte Counties in northern California, but Elmer Applegate reported in his monograph of the genus that fieldwork suggested these populations were instead E. citrinum.

== Conservation ==
Because of the small number of documented populations of Erythronium howellii (fewer than 38), NatureServe ranks this species as vulnerable (G3) globally and as imperiled (S2) in California. The Oregon Biodiversity Information Center and the United States Department of Agriculture both list E. howellii as vulnerable (S3).
