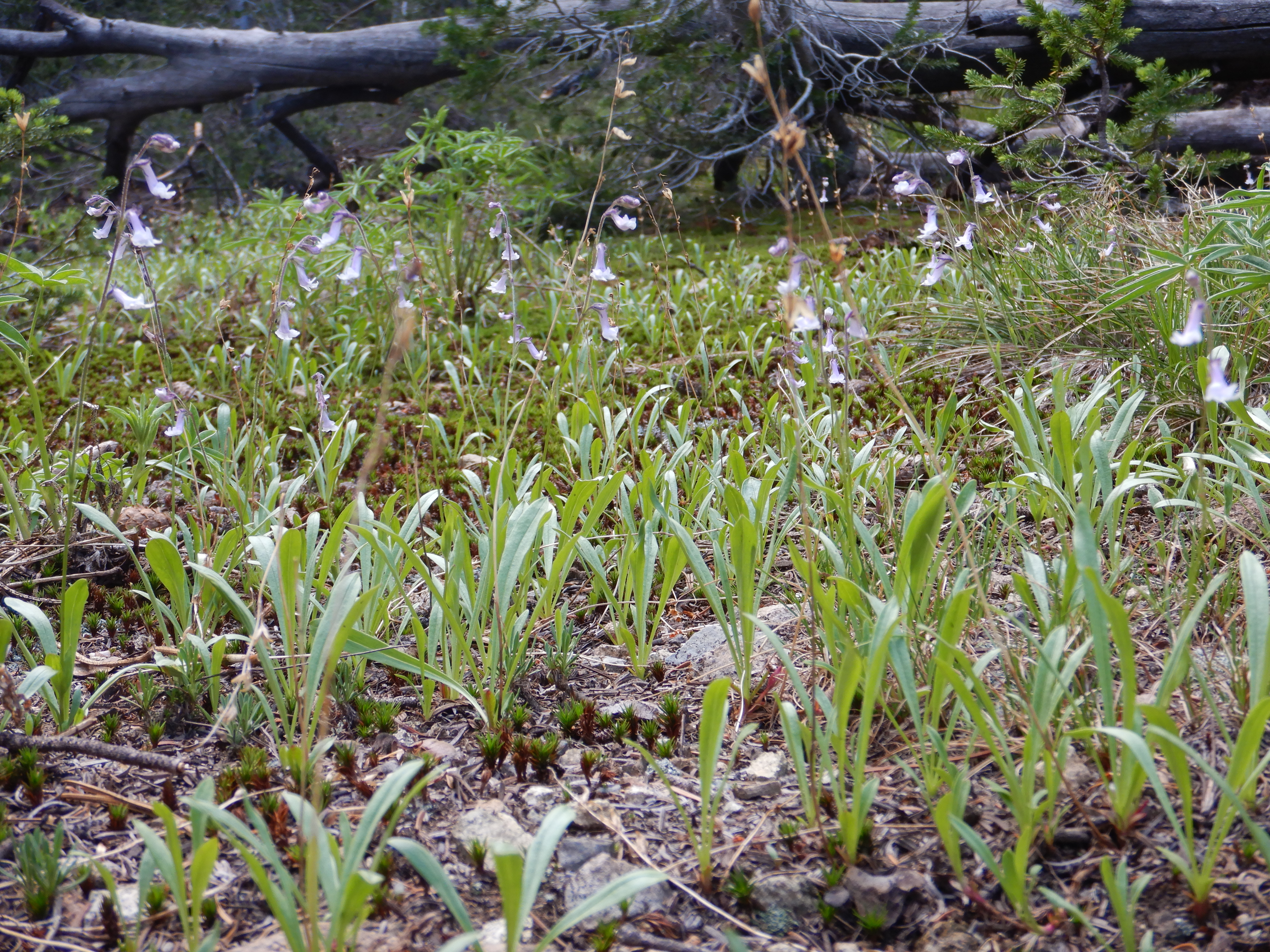
- Chionophylla tweedyi, Montana, USA

Scientific classification
- Kingdom: Plantae
- Clade: Tracheophytes
- Clade: Angiosperms
- Clade: Eudicots
- Clade: Asterids
- Order: Lamiales
- Family: Plantaginaceae
- Genus: Chionophila
- Species: C. tweedyi

Binomial name
- Chionophila tweedyi (Canby & Rose) L.F.Hend. 1900

= Chionophila tweedyi =

Perennial herb in the rose family

Chionophila tweedyi, or Tweedy's snowlover, is a perennial herb in the plantain family. It is native to Idaho and Montana in the western United States.

== Taxonomy ==
Tweedy's snowlover has challenged taxonomists. It was first published as Penstemon tweedyi by William Marriott Canby and Joseph Nelson Rose in March 1890, named in honor of Frank Tweedy, the first to collect it. Tweedy's specimen, an isotype, is deposited at Gray Herbarium at Harvard University. The location of the holotype is unknown.

Just a few months later, in June 1900, Louis Forniquet Henderson moved Tweedy's snowlover to the genus Chionophila. In his publication, he made clear the classification difficulties presented by this plant. "For some time the writer was impressed with the necessity of making a new genus to fit this plant, but the more carefully he weighed each point the more convinced he was that the plant could more naturally be placed in Chionophila." He went on to compare it in detail to Chionophila jamesii, the only other species in the genus, ending with: "To sum up, then, the two plants resemble one another in the ovary and seeds, in the stamens fertile and sterile, in the upper parts of the corollas, in the leaves and their bases, and in their blackening when dried. They depart from one another in the inflorescence, in the corolla-base, in the hairiness of the lower corolla lip, and in the shape of calyx." Henderson had considered placing Tweedy's snowlover in the genus Collinsia, but found greater similarity to Chionophila jamesii.

Per Axel Rydberg disagreed with Henderson's placement of Tweedy's snowlover in the genus Chionophila. In his Flora of the Rocky Mountains (1917), he assigned it to a new genus, Pentstemonopis. But Rydberg's Pentstemonopsis was not widely used, and is no longer accepted. The currently accepted name is Chionophila tweedyi.

Rydberg's 1917 Flora included all three genera to which Tweedy's snowlover has been assigned, and the identification key to genera provided distinguishing features, again showing Tweedy's snowlover's recalcitrance when subjected to classification. Those easily seen are listed here:

Penstemon
Inflorescence (flower cluster) branched; corolla not gibbous (slightly swollen) near base; calyx deeply cleft.
Pentstemonopis
Inflorescence a raceme, not branched; corolla gibbous near base; calyx deeply cleft.
Chionopylla
Inflorescence spike-like, not branched; corolla not gibbous near base; calyx not deeply cleft, tubular to funnel-like, bluntly lobed.

== Description ==
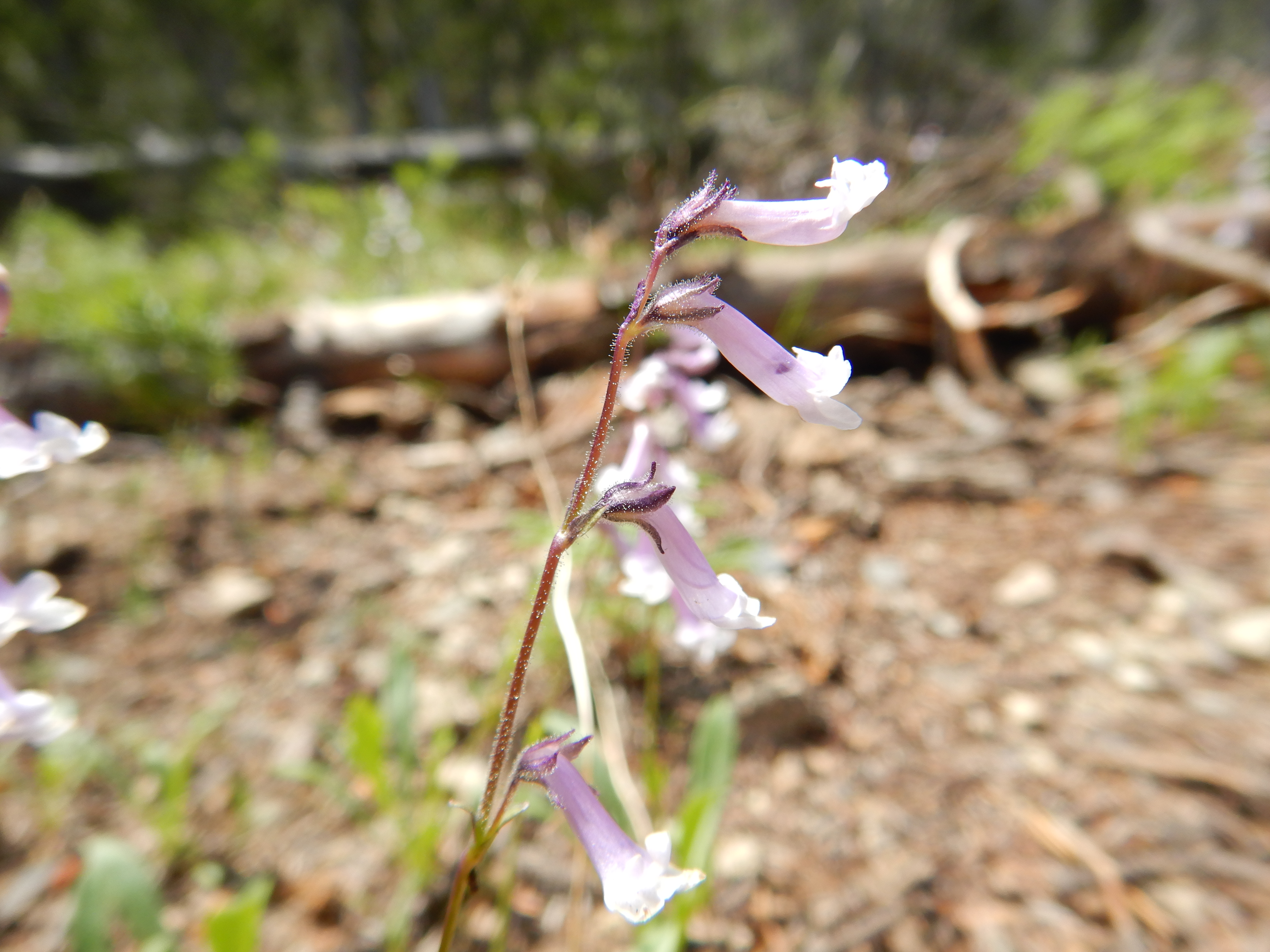
Flowers of Chionophila tweedyi

Chionophila tweedyi is a perennial herb growing up to 30 cm (12 in) tall. Plants are glabrous (no hairs) below, and glandular-hairy above. Its leaves are mostly basal, slender but widening above, and as much as 9 cm (3.5 in) long. Its stem leaves are few, in 1 or 2 pairs, and much smaller. The inflorescence contains 4 to 10 flowers arranged in a one-sided raceme, with each flower subtended by a pair of bracts. The corolla is white and lavender, tubular, 2-lipped, and as much as 13 cm (5.1 in) long.

Chionophila tweedyi is one of two species in the genus. In C. jamesii, which is endemic to south central Wyoming, Colorado, and northern New Mexico, the inflorescence is dense and spikelike with overlapping flowers. In C. tweedyi, flowers are widely spaced with the rachis (stem) clearly visible.

== Distribution ==
Chionophila tweedyi is endemic to the northern Rocky Mountains in central Idaho and southwestern Montana. It has been collected from talus and wet meadows near timber line. The high-elevation affinity of Tweedy's snowlover is reflected in both its common name, 'snowlover', and in the generic name: Greek chion for snow, and philios for loving.

== History ==
Frank Tweedy of the US Geological Survey was the first to collect Tweedy's snowlover, from subalpine bogs at 9,500 ft (2,900 m) elevation, in Beaverhead County, Montana, in 1888. Though a topographer by profession, he was highly regarded for his botanical work. In their publication of the new species, Canby and Rose described Tweedy as "a zealous collector in this region for the past eight years", and noted his authorship of Flora of the Yellowstone National Park.

== Conservation status ==
Tweedy's snowlover is ranked G4, i.e., apparently secure overall. It is ranked S4 in Montana, where it's restricted to the western part of the state, but locally common in suitable habitat.
