= Astragalus tyghensis =

Conservation status
- Imperiled (NatureServe)

Scientific classification
- Kingdom: Plantae
- Clade: Tracheophytes
- Clade: Angiosperms
- Clade: Eudicots
- Clade: Rosids
- Order: Fabales
- Family: Fabaceae
- Subfamily: Faboideae
- Genus: Astragalus
- Species: A. tyghensis

Binomial name
- Astragalus tyghensis M.Peck

Species of legume

Astragalus tyghensis is a species of flowering plant in the legume family known by the common name Tygh Valley milkvetch. It is endemic to Oregon in the United States, where it is known only from the Tygh Valley of Wasco County.

This species is a perennial herb growing from a stout taproot and a branching caudex. The plant forms mats or clumps, with stems growing prostrate or upright and up to 55 centimeters long. Most of the plant is covered in long, silky hairs. The leaves are divided into a number of leaflets each up to 1.7 centimeters long. The inflorescence is a raceme of up to 40 flowers. Each flower has a calyx of very hairy sepals and a pale yellow corolla up to 1.2 centimeters long. The fruit is a legume pod up to 0.7 centimeters long. The flowers are pollinated by insects, particularly bees, and the plant reproduces by seed.

This species grows in sagebrush, prairie, and grassland habitat, and may occur along roadsides.

This species was a candidate for federal protection by the United States Fish and Wildlife Service. It is now considered a Species of Concern. The plant's habitat has been consumed for agricultural purposes. It also faces competition with noxious weeds, such as Centaurea diffusa.
