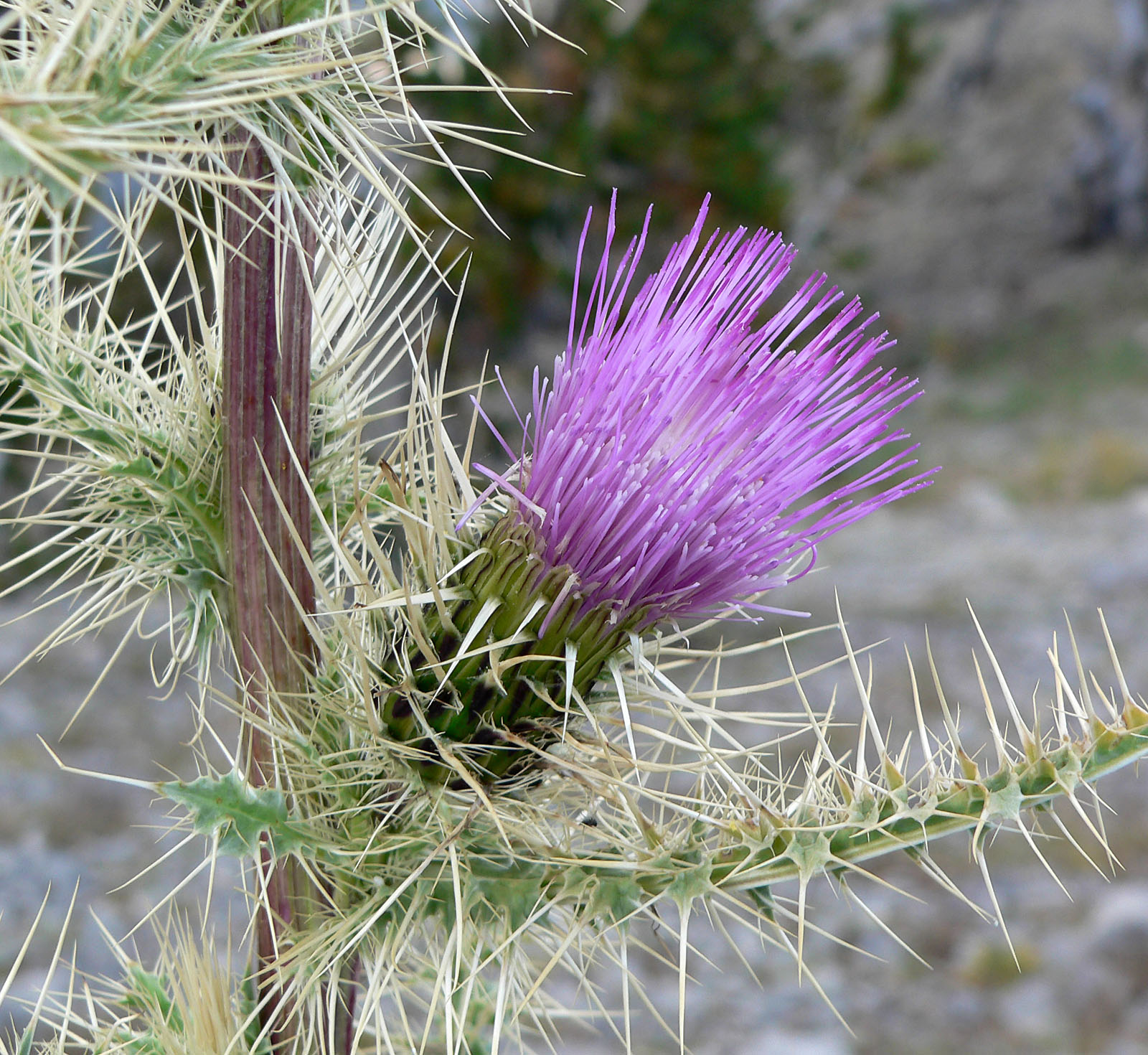
- Cirsium eatonii var. clokeyi in Southern Nevada

Conservation status
- Secure (NatureServe)

Scientific classification
- Kingdom: Plantae
- Clade: Embryophytes
- Clade: Tracheophytes
- Clade: Spermatophytes
- Clade: Angiosperms
- Clade: Eudicots
- Clade: Asterids
- Order: Asterales
- Family: Asteraceae
- Genus: Cirsium
- Species: C. eatonii

Binomial name
- Cirsium eatonii (A.Gray) B.L.Rob.

Synonyms
- Synonymy: Carduus leiocarpus A.Heller; Carduus leiocephalus (D.C.Eaton) A.Heller; Cirsium eatonii var. harrisonii S.L.Welsh; Cirsium eriocephalum var. leiocephalum D.C.Eaton; Cnicus eatonii A.Gray; Carduus hookerianus var. eriocephalus (A.Gray) A.Nelson, syn of var. eriocephalum; Carduus scopulorum Greene, syn of var. eriocephalum; Cirsium eriocephalum A.Gray 1864 not Wallr. 1840, syn of var. eriocephalum; Cirsium hookerianum var. eriocephalum (A.Gray) A.Nelson, syn of var. eriocephalum; Cirsium scopulorum (Greene) Cockerell, syn of var. eriocephalum; Cirsium scopulorum (Greene) Cockerell ex Daniels, syn of var. eriocephalum; Cnicus eriocephalus A.Gray, syn of var. eriocephalum; Carduus hesperius A.Heller, syn of var. hesperium; Carduus hookerianus var. hesperius (Eastw.) A.Nelson, syn of var. hesperium; Cirsium hesperium (Eastw.) Petr., syn of var. hesperium; Cnicus hesperius Eastw., syn of var. hesperium; Carduus polyphyllus Rydb., syn of var. murdockii; Carduus tweedyi Rydb., syn of var. murdockii; Cirsium murdockii (S.L.Welsh) Cronquist, syn of var. murdockii; Cirsium polyphyllum (Rydb.) Petr., syn of var. murdockii; Cirsium tweedyi (Rydb.) Petr., syn of var. murdockii; Cirsium peckii L.F.Hend., syn of var. peckii

= Cirsium eatonii =

Species of thistle

Cirsium eatonii, commonly known as Eaton's thistle or mountaintop thistle, is a North American species of flowering plants in the family Asteraceae.

The species has been found in Idaho, Montana, New Mexico, Wyoming, Nevada, Utah and Colorado.

== Description ==
Cirsium eatonii is highly variable. It is an erect herb up to 150 cm (60 inches or 5 feet) tall in some populations. The entire foliage is more or less spiny. One plant produces several flower heads with pink to purple or yellow flowers. The species grows at high elevations in grasslands, sagebrush steppes, open savannahs, etc.

Varieties

A number of varieties have been identified, which include:

- Cirsium eatonii var. clokeyi - Clokey thistle, Spring Mountains thistle, white-spine thistle. This variety is rare and uncommon. - Nevada
- Cirsium eatonii var. eatonii - Nevada, Utah
- Cirsium eatonii var. eriocephalum - alpine thistle, mountain thistle - Colorado, New Mexico, Utah
- Cirsium eatonii var. hesperium - tall mountain thistle - Colorado
- Cirsium eatonii var. murdockii - northern mountain thistle - Colorado, Idaho, Montana, Nevada, Utah, Wyoming
- Cirsium eatonii var. peckii - ghost thistle, Steens Mountain thistle - Nevada, Oregon
- Cirsium eatonii var. viperinum - Snake Range thistle - Nevada

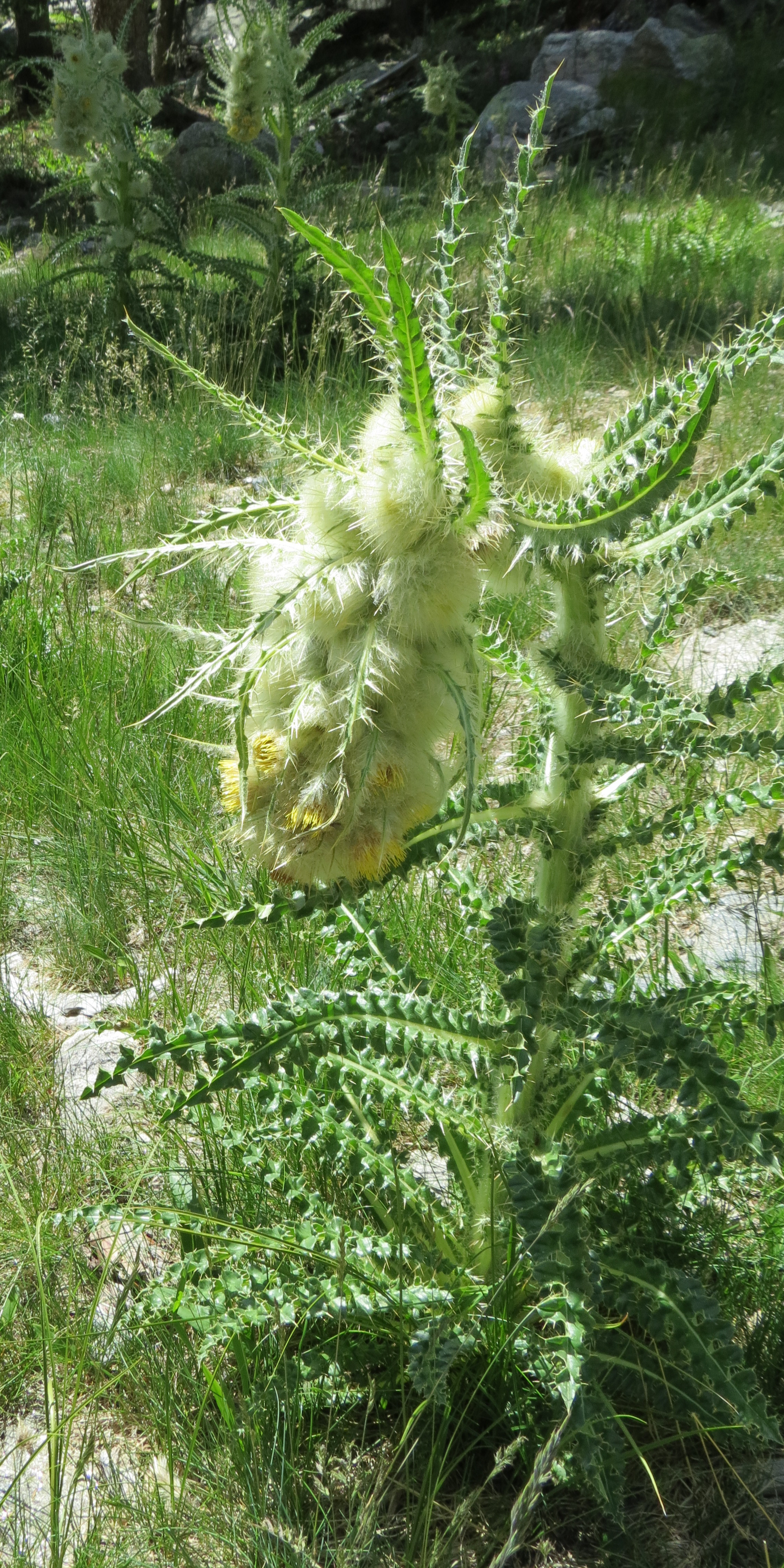
Var. eriocephalum in northern New Mexico.
