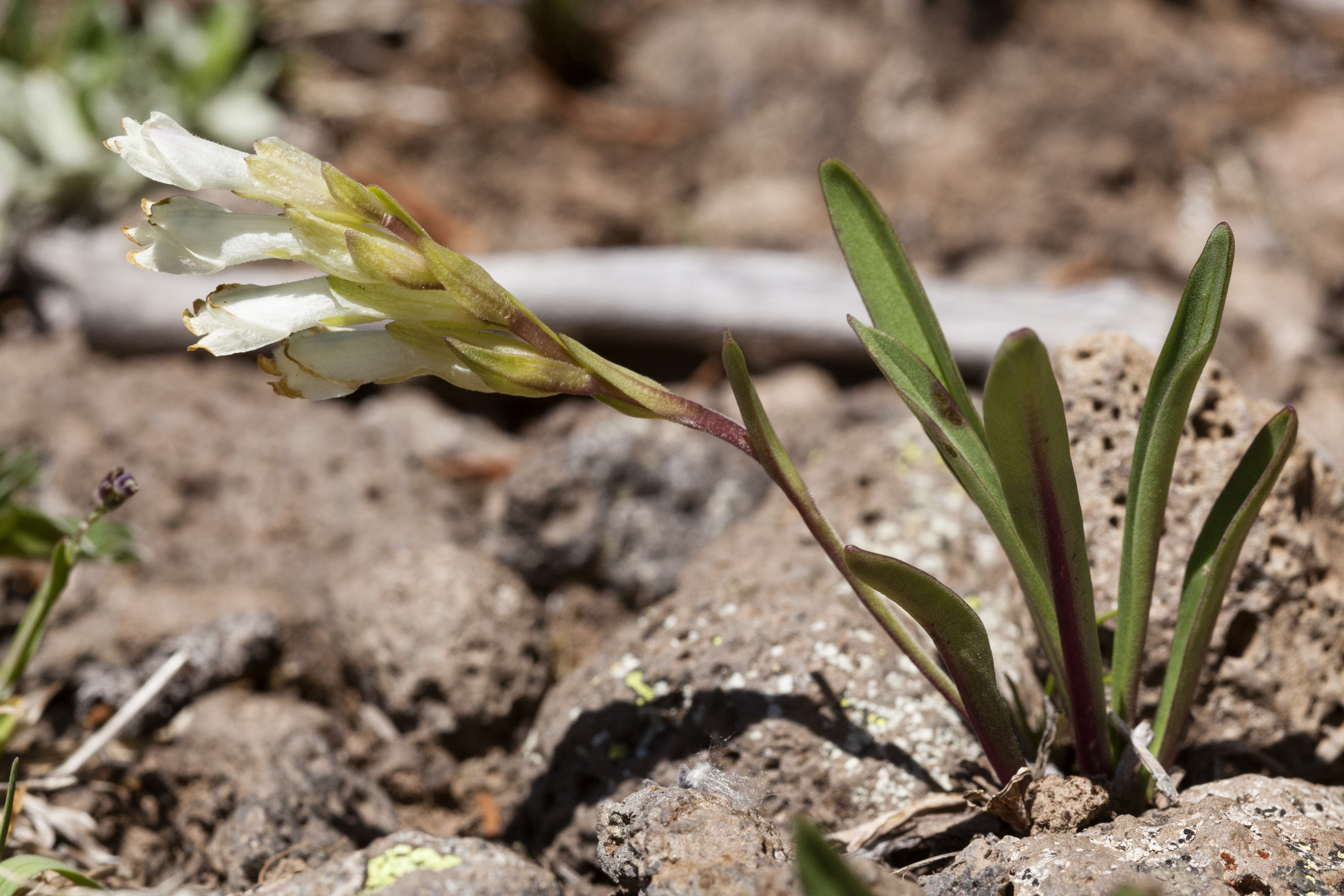
- In the San Juan Mountains south of Red Lake

Conservation status
- Apparently Secure (NatureServe)

Scientific classification
- Kingdom: Plantae
- Clade: Tracheophytes
- Clade: Angiosperms
- Clade: Eudicots
- Clade: Asterids
- Order: Lamiales
- Family: Plantaginaceae
- Genus: Chionophila
- Species: C. jamesii

Binomial name
- Chionophila jamesii Benth.

= Chionophila jamesii =

Plant species in the veronica family

Chionophila jamesii, the Rocky Mountain snowlover, is one of the two species in the snowlover genus. It only grows at high elevations in the Southern Rocky Mountains of the western United States.

== Description ==
Rocky Mountain snowlover is a small plant that usually has one or two flowering stems, though it can occasionally have three. These typically grow 5 to 12 centimeters (2–4.5 in) tall, but they can be as short as 3 cm (1 in) or as tall as 15 cm (6 in). It is a perennial that has slightly tuberous roots and short rhizomes. Its stems are usually puberulent, covered in thin, short, erect hairs, or covered in backwards pointing hairs, but occasionally can be almost hairless.

Plants have both basal leaves and cauline ones attached to the stems, but the leaves attached to the stems are smaller and very few in number. The basal leaves are 1.2–7.8 centimeters long, but just 0.2–1.8 cm wide. They are spatulate, shaped like a spoon, to oblanceolate, like a reversed spear head, but sometimes quite narrowly. There are just one to three pairs of leaves attached to the stems measuring 8–28 millimeters long and only 1–3 mm wide. They are linear, like blade of grass, to narrowly lanceolate. In the fall its basal leaves become much more visible by turning bright salmon red. Before the development of flowering stems the basal leaves of western bistort (Bistorta bistortoides) resemble those of Rocky Mountain snowlover, but its leaves are longer and the veins are more visible.

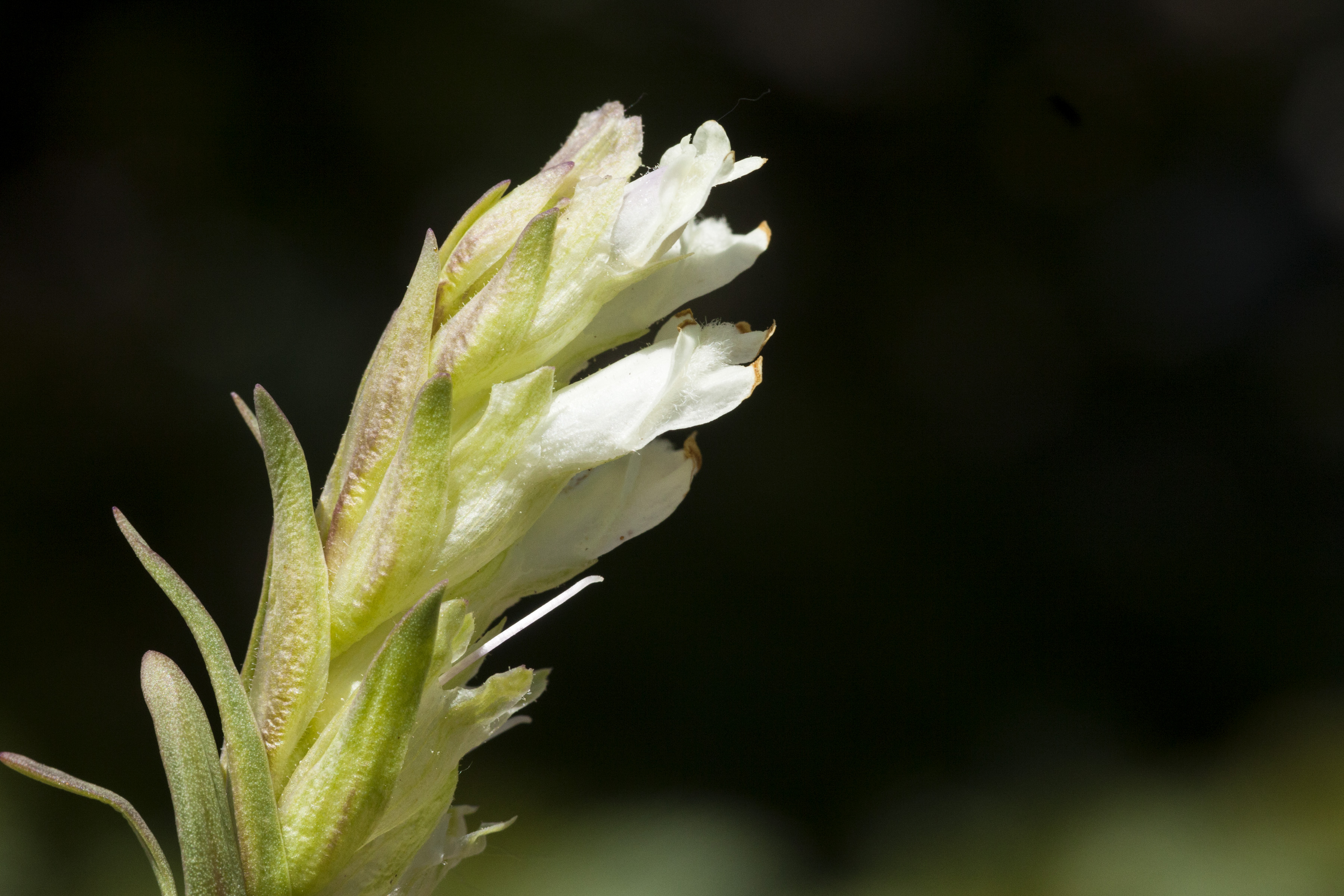
Side view of inflorescence

The inflorescence is a spike-like raceme with all its tightly packed white, cream, or greenish-white flowers facing in one direction. The flowers darken easily with even fresh flowers often having brown tips and preserved specimens turning black. The inflorescence measures 1–5 cm and has two to seven groups of flowers and is sparsely hairy, usually with glandular hairs. The bracts associated with the flowers are 0.8–1.9 cm long.

The sepals are fused into funnel-shaped calyx; it measures 6–12 mm long with five triangular lobes and is pale green. The petals are united into a tube that ends in a mouth with an upper and lower lip. The upper lip has two shallow lobes and the lower is longer and hairy with three lobes. The overall length of the corolla is 1––1.5 cm and the exterior of the tube is hairless. Unlike a penstemon, the staminode is shorter than the stamens and is always hairless; the staminode measures 5–7 mm. Typically flowering can be as early as June or as late as August, however it rarely might occur as late as September. In a study of plants in one location the average length of blooming was 20 days plus or minus nine days.

The fruit is a capsule 8–9.5 mm long and 4.5–6 mm wide. It splits along the partitions between the chambers and is filled with larger numbers of seeds. Each seed is 1–2.2 mm long and dark brown with a metallic shine. They are ellipsoid to fusiform, shaped like a squashed globe or a spindle, but with tails on each end.

== Taxonomy ==
Chionophila jamesii is classified in the genus Chionophila along with one other North American species, Chionophila tweedyi. Together they are part of the family Plantaginaceae. The genus most closely resembles Penstemon, but the exact relationship between plants in tribe Cheloneae is unclear. The species was scientifically described in 1846 along with its genus by George Bentham. It has no subspecies or botanical synonyms.

=== Names ===
The genus name is Botanical Latin derived from Greek χιών (chion) meaning "snow" and φῐ́λος (philos) meaning loving, referring to its snowy high elevation habitat. The species was named for the botanist and abolitionist Edwin James. James collected the first specimens of the flowers while climbing Pikes Peak during the Stephen H. Long Expedition of 1820. It is known by the common name Rocky Mountain snowlover. Like the other species in the genus and the genus itself it is sometimes simply called snowlover. In the early 1900s it was sometimes called Dr. James's Snow-Flower.

== Range and habitat ==
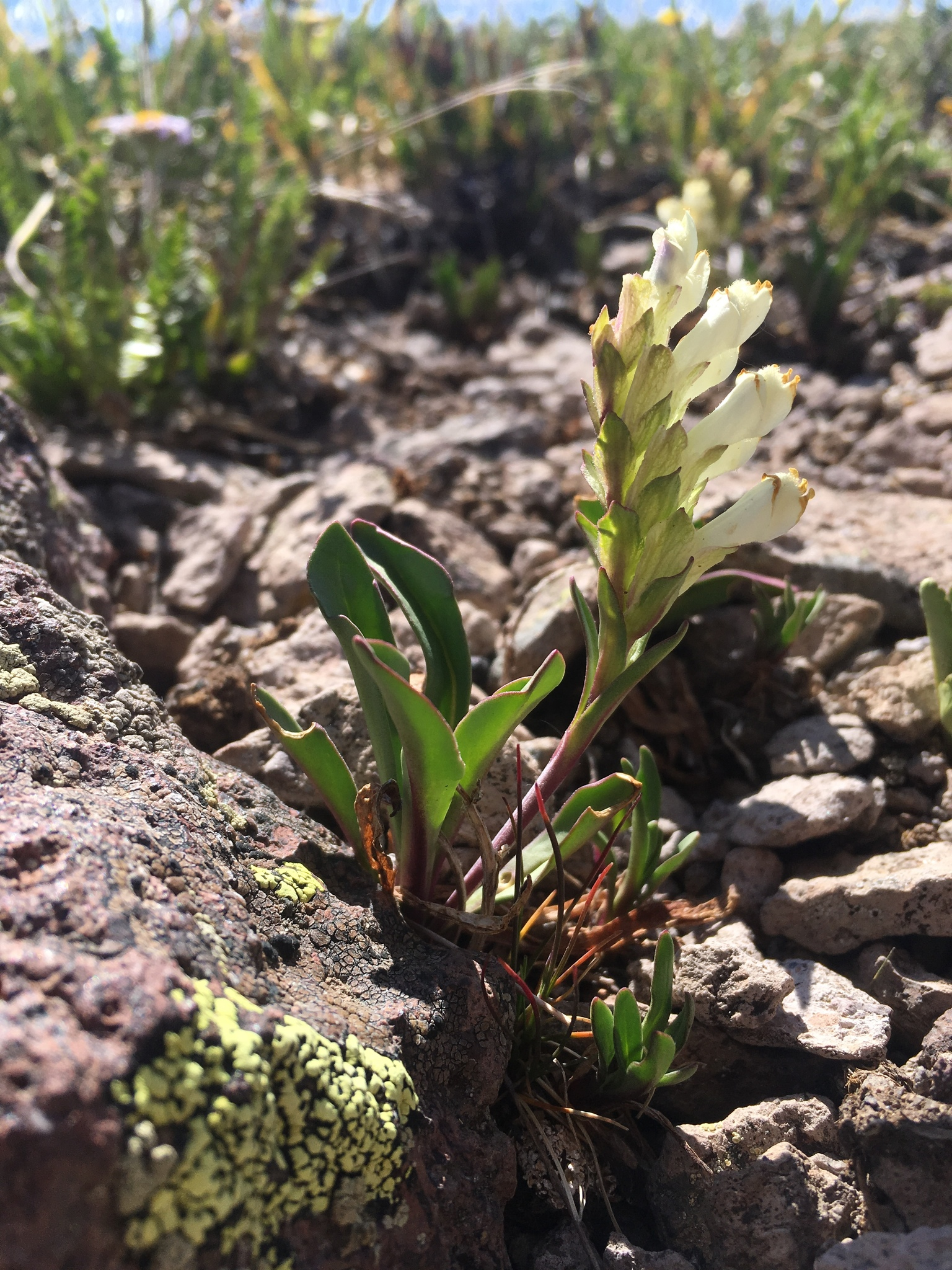
Blooming amid rocks, South San Juan Wilderness, Rio Grande National Forest, Conejos County, Colorado

Rocky Mountain snowlover is endemic to the Southern Rocky Mountains in southern Wyoming, Colorado, and north-central New Mexico. Its range stretches from the Medicine Bow Mountains in Wyoming south through Colorado to the Culebra Range in northernmost New Mexico. In Wyoming it grows in one area extending across the boarder of Carbon County and Albany County with the largest single population found on the western slopes of Medicine Bow Peak in Carbon County. The species is widespread in the mountains of Colorado with most specimens found in areas near the Continental Divide, but with some sightings significantly to the east or west. To the south it is only known from Taos County, New Mexico. The lowest elevation for the species is 3,300 meters (10,800 ft), and Ackerfield reports it can grow as high as 4,300 meters (14,000 ft).

The habitat for Rocky Mountain snowlover is mostly moist, gravelly slopes in alpine tundra, although it is also found in bogs in the subalpine zone. Above timberline it grows in meadows, scree fields at cliff bases, and also clay soils on slopes. However, the species only grows in areas with winter snowcover. Research on the Niwot Ridge in the 1990s found the optimal snow depth for Rocky Mountain snowlover is 2 to 3 meters (6.5–10 ft) and confirms its dependence on deep snowbanks.

=== Conservation ===
In 1994 Rocky Mountain snowlover was evaluated by the conservation organization NatureServe and rated as apparently secure at the global level (G4). They also rated it as apparently secure in New Mexico (S4), but rated it as vulnerable in Colorado (S3) and imperiled in Wyoming (S2).

== Ecology ==
Rocky Mountain snowlover is one many plants that will establish itself in the cushions of moss campion (Silene acaulis) after they pioneer newly open ground in the alpine tundra. In a study on the Niwot Ridge published in 2018 the researchers found that the average first date of blooming was 16 July, plus or minus eight days.

== Use and culture ==
Rarely, Rocky Mountain snowlover is cultivated in rock gardens. It is grown in moist, but well drained, raised beds with gravel soil. The other species in the genus is not in cultivation.

Though the most common of the rare alpine plants of Colorado, it is rarely seen by tourists due to the isolated nature of its habitat. The easiest places to view the plants in their native habitat are along the Trail Ridge Road in Rocky Mountain National Park and in alpine areas near the Mount Blue Sky Scenic Byway.
