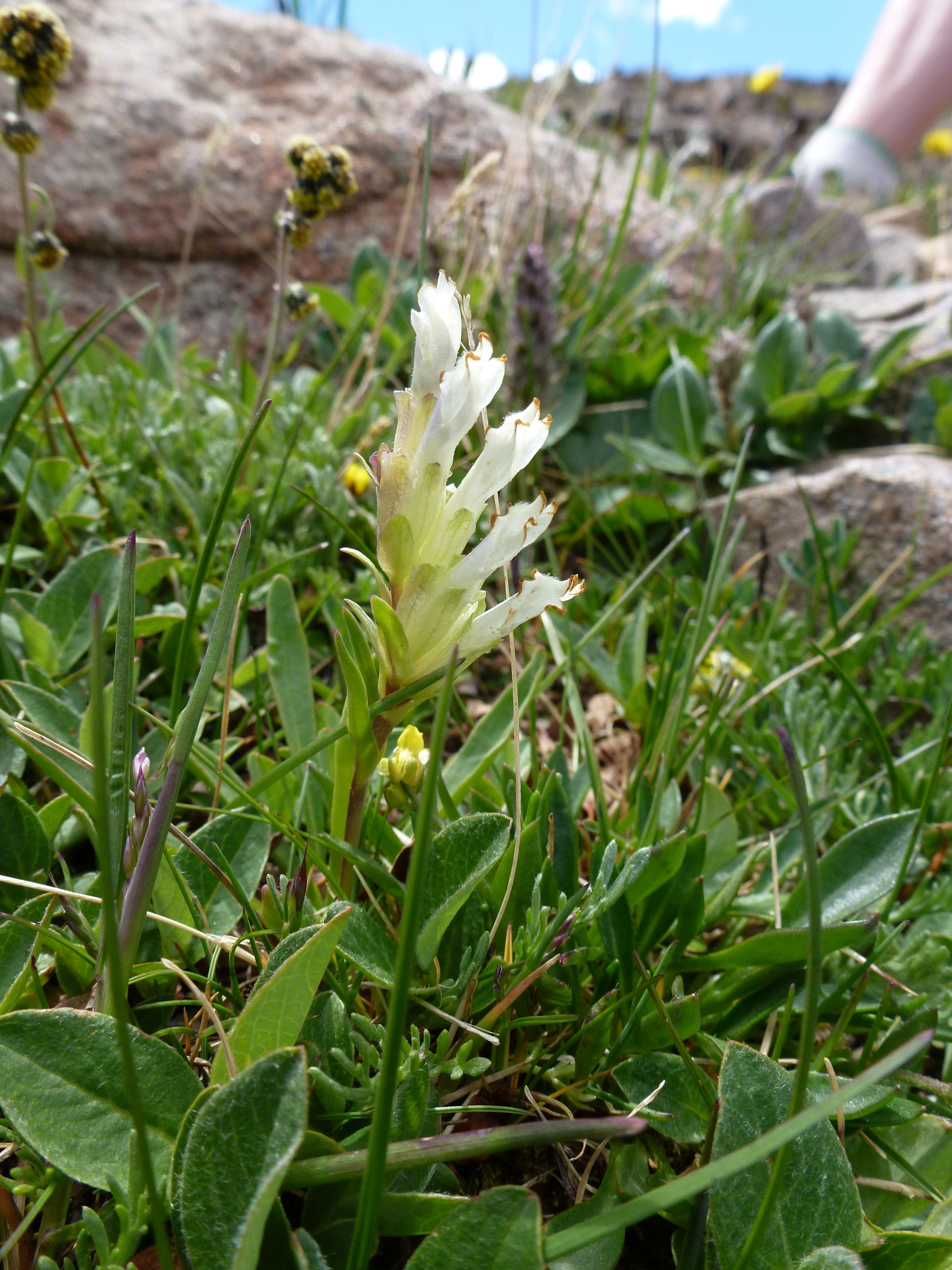
- Chionophila jamesii

Scientific classification
- Kingdom: Plantae
- Clade: Tracheophytes
- Clade: Angiosperms
- Clade: Eudicots
- Clade: Asterids
- Order: Lamiales
- Family: Plantaginaceae
- Tribe: Cheloneae
- Genus: Chionophila; Benth.

Species
- Chionophila jamesii; Chionophila tweedyi

Synonyms
- Pentstemonopsis

= Chionophila =

Plant genus in the veronica family

Chionophila, also known as snowlover, is a genus of plants in the veronica family. They are most similar to the penstemons, though a distinct group.

== Description ==
Snowlovers are distinguished from other North American species in the veronica family by having a single staminode, seeds with wings, and smooth leaf edges, but lacking bracteoles. They are perennial plants with stems that can grow along the ground or straight upwards from the plant's crown. They have short rhizomes and slightly tuberous roots.

They have basal leaves, those attached to the base of the plant, and cauline ones attached to the stems. The attached to the stems are smaller than the basal leaves and attached in pairs to opposite sides of the stems, though sometimes they are attached alternately on the uppermost part of the stem. Although, most of the leaves are basal.

The flowers are in a spike-like raceme, the flowers attached directly to the main stem or by very short flower stalks. The flowers are secund, all facing away from the stem in the same direction.

== Taxonomy ==
The genus Chionophila was scientifically described in 1846 with one species by George Bentham. It is classified as part of the family Plantaginaceae and is placed with the Cheloneae within the family. Though they have many similarities to the Penstemons the relationships in the tribe are unclear. It has one botanical synonym, Pentstemonopsis created by Per Axel Rydberg in 1917. According to Plants of the World Online it has two accepted species:

=== Chionophila jamesii ===
This species was described by Bentham alongside the genus in 1846. It is native to Colorado, New Mexico, and Wyoming. It is distinguished by having its flowers tightly packed on the inflorescence and has a calyx of fused sepals with a tube 8–9 millimeters long.

=== Chionophila tweedyi ===
This species was first described in 1890 as Penstemon tweedyi by William Marriott Canby and Joseph Nelson Rose. It was moved to Chionophila in 1900 by Edward George Henderson. This is also the species that Rydberg created the synonymous genus Pentstemonopsis for in 1917. It is native to Idaho and Montana. It is distinguished by having its flowers in groups spread out on the inflorescence and has a calyx of fused sepals with a tube 1–2 millimeters long.

=== Names ===
The genus name is a Botanical Latin compound from two Greek words χιών (chion) meaning "snow" and φῐ́λος (philos) meaning loving, referring to the snowy high elevation habitat. The genus is likewise known by the common names snowlover, snow-lover, or snow lover, though both species are also casually called snowlover.
