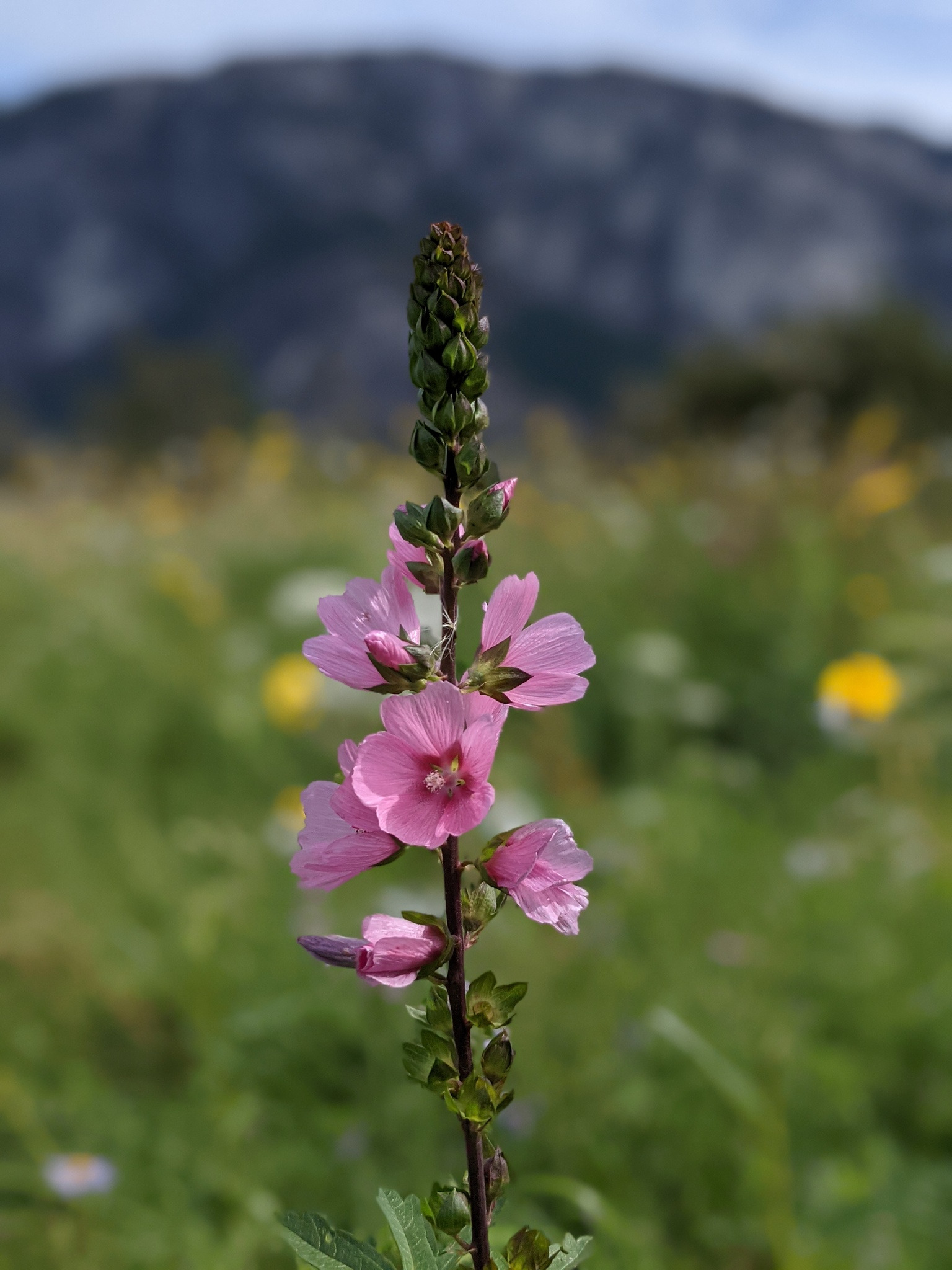

Conservation status
- Vulnerable (NatureServe)

Scientific classification
- Kingdom: Plantae
- Clade: Tracheophytes
- Clade: Angiosperms
- Clade: Eudicots
- Clade: Rosids
- Order: Malvales
- Family: Malvaceae
- Genus: Sidalcea
- Species: S. hendersonii

Binomial name
- Sidalcea hendersonii S.Watson

= Sidalcea hendersonii =

Species of flowering plant

Sidalcea hendersonii is a species of flowering plant in the mallow family known by the common name Henderson's checker-mallow. It is native to the Pacific Northwest region of North America. It is named for Oregon botanist Dr. Louis Forniquet Henderson (1853–1942), who was a professor at the University of Oregon.

== Distribution ==
Occurs in coastal areas spanning from southern Oregon to Vancouver Island and mainland British Columbia. Its range follows the coastline; it grows in tidal marshes and meadows. Extremely rare in Oregon, uncommon in Washington, and rare in British Columbia.

== Description ==
Sidalcea hendersonii is a taprooted perennial herb that grows from thick and stubby rhizomes. It has a basal rosette of toothed basal leaves. Stems are erect and hollow, and typically tinged purple. Flowers are five-petaled and numerous, typically fifty or more per plant, forming in branched racemes atop stems. After flowering, seed fruits are developed. They are capsular, with 5 to 10 chambers, each containing one seed.

== Ecology ==
Sidalcea hendersonii needs wet soil so its range is limited to tidal marches and flats that experience inundation at low elevations. Its range is scattered, ranging from Southern British Columbia to the mouth of the Umpqua River. This plant is considered at risk by NatureServe due to the following reasons: "This species is limited to the coastal tideland and marshes along the Pacific Northwest from as far south as Douglas County, Oregon to Vancouver Island, British Columbia, Canada. A recent collection in Alaska suggests a range extension. Outlying occurrences are found in Oregon and British Columbia with the majority of the global population in Washington state. Total estimated occurrences are between 21–100 with plant numbers estimated as over 3000+ but probably more like 10,000+. There do not appear to be any imminent threats to this species."
