= Native Americans in Colorado =

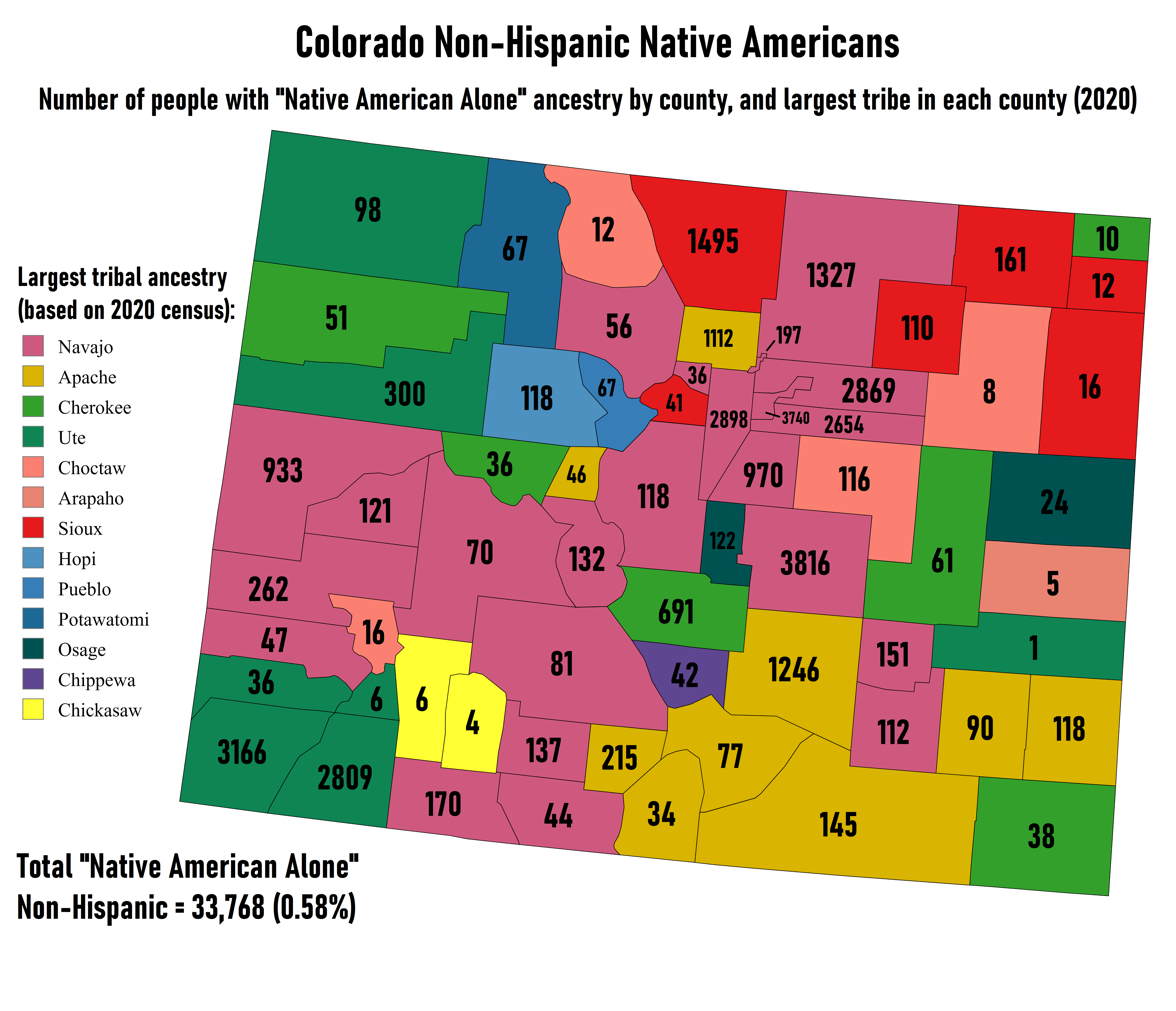

Total population
- 74,129 (2020)

Languages
- Native American languages of Colorado

Religion
- Native American religion

The territory on which Denver is situated was originally the domain of the Arapaho Indian tribe, as established in the 1851 Treaty of Fort Laramie. Following the discovery of gold in the late 1850s, a significant influx of white European settlers arrived in the region, claiming their rights to the land. This led to the Treaty of Fort Wise in 1861, during which some tribal leaders ceded their land. The Sand Creek Massacre in 1864 resulted in the tragic deaths of hundreds of Arapaho and Cheyenne individuals, and shortly thereafter, these tribes were forcibly relocated from Colorado. Additionally, other indigenous Native American nations that are native to Colorado include the Apache, Comanche, Shoshone, and Ute tribes. The Ute nation comprises the Southern Ute Indian Tribe and the Ute Mountain Ute Tribe, both of which are federally recognized and have their headquarters located in Ignacio, Colorado, and Towaoc, Colorado respectively. Historically, these tribes have inhabited the southern and western regions of Colorado.

== See also ==
- Hispanics and Latinos in Colorado
- History of Colorado
