= Manual of the Higher Plants of Oregon =

Flora of Oregon

Manual of the Higher Plants of Oregon was an early flora of plants of Oregon written by Morton Peck.

It was praised for its format, portability, phylogenetic keys, having new species recorded, and completeness of both descriptions of plants and physiographic provinces. The second edition (1961) includes many changes to the first edition (1941) which, according to Peck, is "now decidedly out of date."

== See also ==
- Flora of Oregon
- Flora (publication)
