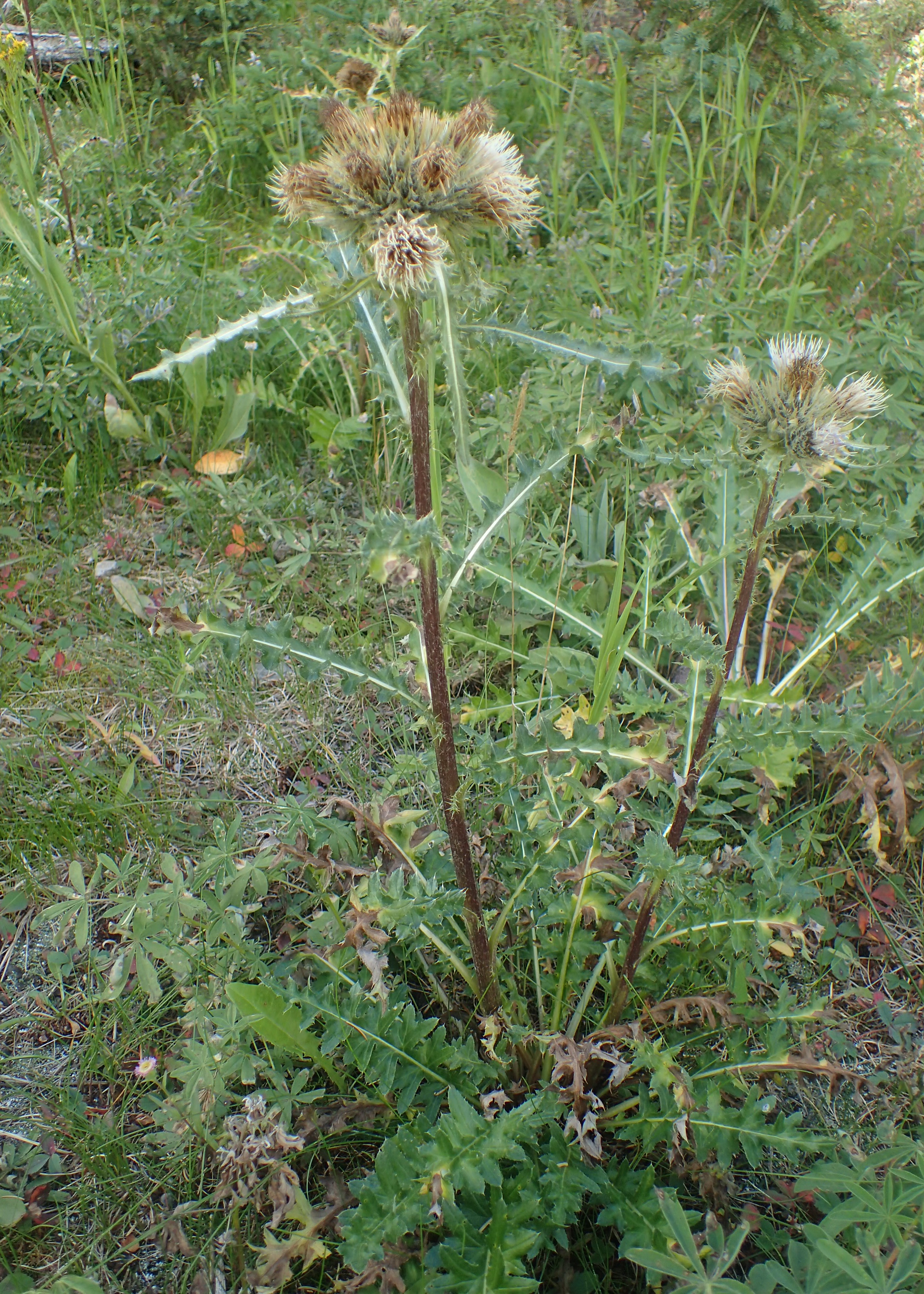

Scientific classification
- Kingdom: Plantae
- Clade: Tracheophytes
- Clade: Angiosperms
- Clade: Eudicots
- Clade: Asterids
- Order: Asterales
- Family: Asteraceae
- Genus: Cirsium
- Species: C. clavatum

Binomial name
- Cirsium clavatum (M.E.Jones) Petr.

Synonyms
- Synonymy: Carduus clavatus (M.E.Jones) A.Heller; Cnicus clavatus M.E.Jones; Carduus centaureae Rydb.; Carduus laterifolius Osterh., syn of var. americanum; Carduus spathulatus Osterh., syn of var. americanum; Cirsium centaureae (Rydb.) K.Schum., syn of var. americanum; Cirsium griseum (Rydb.) K.Schum., syn of var. americanum; Cirsium laterifolium (Osterh.) Petr., syn of var. americanum; Cirsium modestum (Osterh.) Cockerell, syn of var. americanum; Cirsium scapanolepis Petr., syn of var. americanum; Cirsium spathulifolium Rydb., syn of var. americanum; Cnicus americanus (A.Gray) A.Gray, syn of var. americanum; Carduus araneosus Osterh., syn of var. osterhoutii; Carduus osterhoutii Rydb., syn of var. osterhoutii; Cirsium araneans Rydb., syn of var. osterhoutii; Cirsium osterhoutii (Rydb.) Petr., syn of var. osterhoutii

= Cirsium clavatum =

Species of thistle

Cirsium clavatum, the Fish Lake thistle or fringed thistle, is a North American species of plants in the tribe Cardueae within the family Asteraceae. The species is native to the western United States, the States of Wyoming, Colorado, Utah, Arizona, and New Mexico.

Cirsium clavatum is a biennial or perennial herb up to 100 cm (40 inches) tall, blooming only once before dying. Leaves have thin spines along the edge, much smaller than those of related species. There are several to many flower heads, with white or pale pink disc florets but no ray florets.

Varieties

- Cirsium clavatum var. americanum (A.Gray) D.J.Keil - Colorado, Utah, Wyoming
- Cirsium clavatum var. clavatum - Colorado, Utah
- Cirsium clavatum var. osterhoutii (Rydb.) D.J.Keil - Colorado
