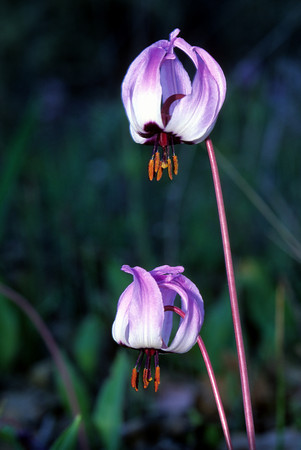

Conservation status
- Apparently Secure (NatureServe)

Scientific classification
- Kingdom: Plantae
- Clade: Tracheophytes
- Clade: Angiosperms
- Clade: Monocots
- Order: Liliales
- Family: Liliaceae
- Subfamily: Lilioideae
- Genus: Erythronium
- Species: E. hendersonii

Binomial name
- Erythronium hendersonii S.Watson

= Erythronium hendersonii =

Henderson's fawn lily

Species of flowering plant

Erythronium hendersonii, or Henderson's fawn lily, is a plant in the lily family native to southwestern Oregon, and northern California. It can be locally very abundant within its range which is in the Rogue River, and Applegate River drainage basins in Josephine County and Jackson County in Oregon, as well as sites in Siskiyou, Del Norte, and Mendocino Counties in California.

== Description ==
Erythronium hendersonii has a pair of mottled leaves, and its scape can bear up to eleven blossoms, but more commonly 1–4. The flower color is distinctive among all western North American Erythronium species. The color of the recurved tepals varies from a deep velvety purple, to lavender. The base of the tepals is dark purple, and surrounded by a tinge of white or yellow. The stigma is unlobed to shortly three-lobed, and the anthers are purple to brown.

This species is named for Louis F. Henderson, who has been called "The Grand Old Man of Northwest Botany".

== Ecology ==
It blooms early in the southern part of its range starting in February, with some locations carpeted by E. hendersonii in the thousands in March, where it often blooms with Dodecatheon hendersonii. It blooms at higher elevations through May. It is most abundant in dry, open woodlands of Ponderosa pine, Garry oak, and madrone.

== Cultivation ==
In the UK, Erythronium henderonii has received the Royal Horticultural Society's Award of Garden Merit.
