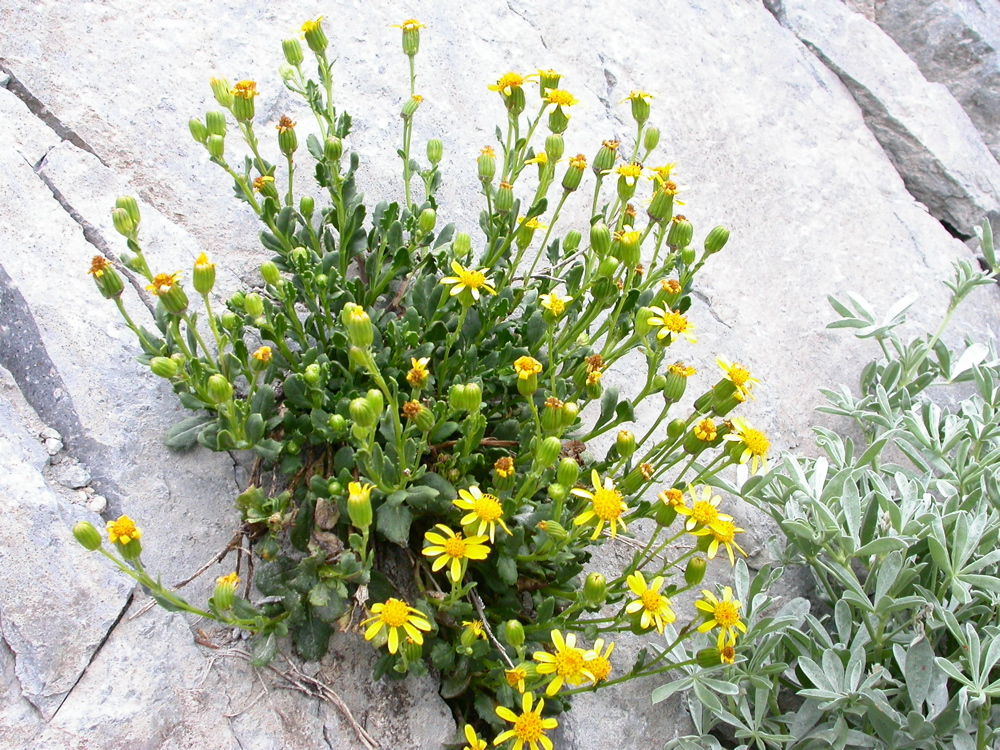
- Senecio fremontii var. fremontii

Conservation status
- Secure (NatureServe)

Scientific classification
- Kingdom: Plantae
- Clade: Tracheophytes
- Clade: Angiosperms
- Clade: Eudicots
- Clade: Asterids
- Order: Asterales
- Family: Asteraceae
- Genus: Senecio
- Species: S. fremontii

Binomial name
- Senecio fremontii Torr. & A.Gray (1843)

Synonyms
- Senecio ductoris Piper; Sources: IPNI, IPNI, ITIS

= Senecio fremontii =

Dwarf mountain ragwort

Species of flowering plant

Senecio fremontii, the dwarf mountain ragwort, is a species of the family Asteraceae. It takes its scientific name from John C. Frémont.
