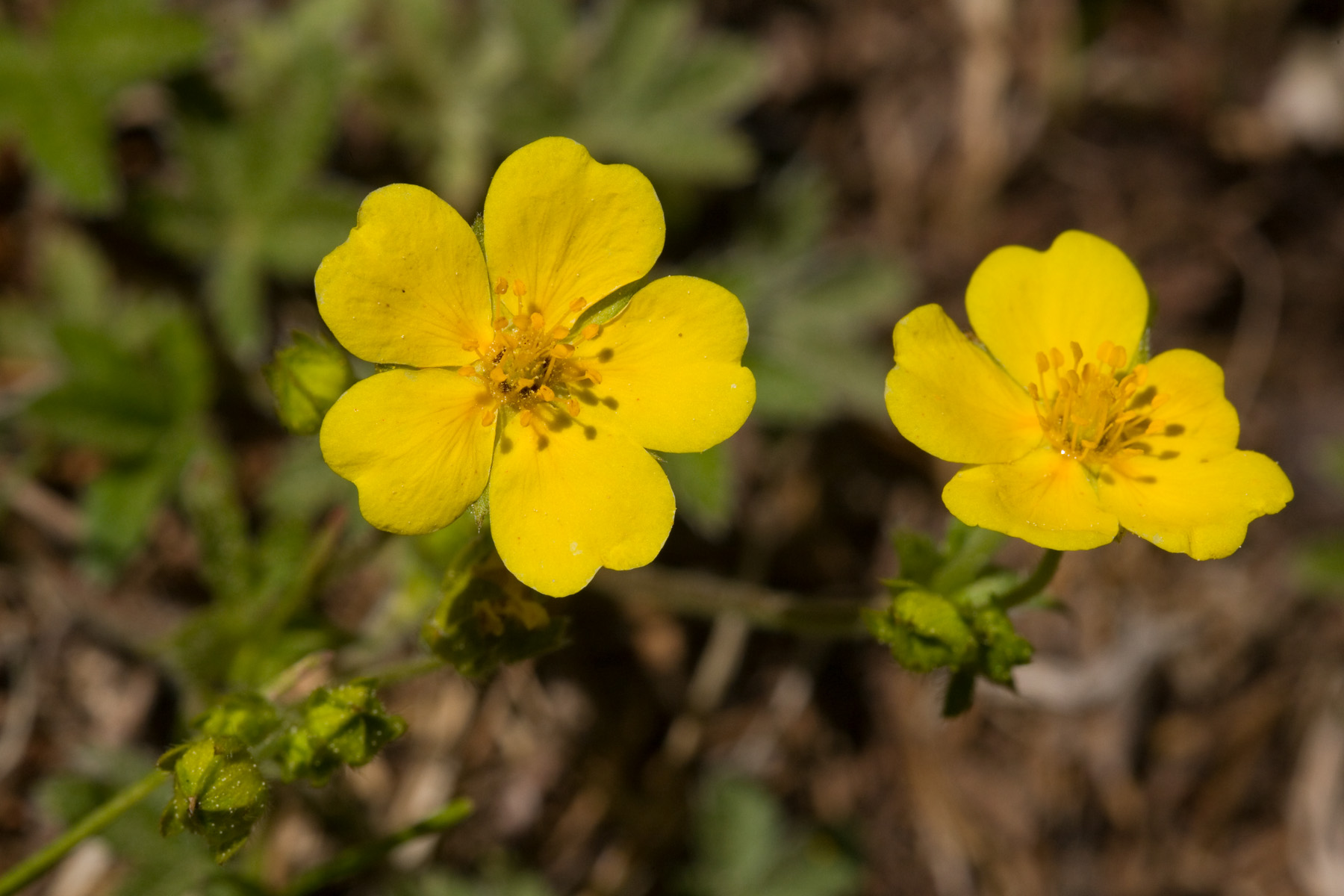
- Flowers in the Sacramento Mountains, New Mexico
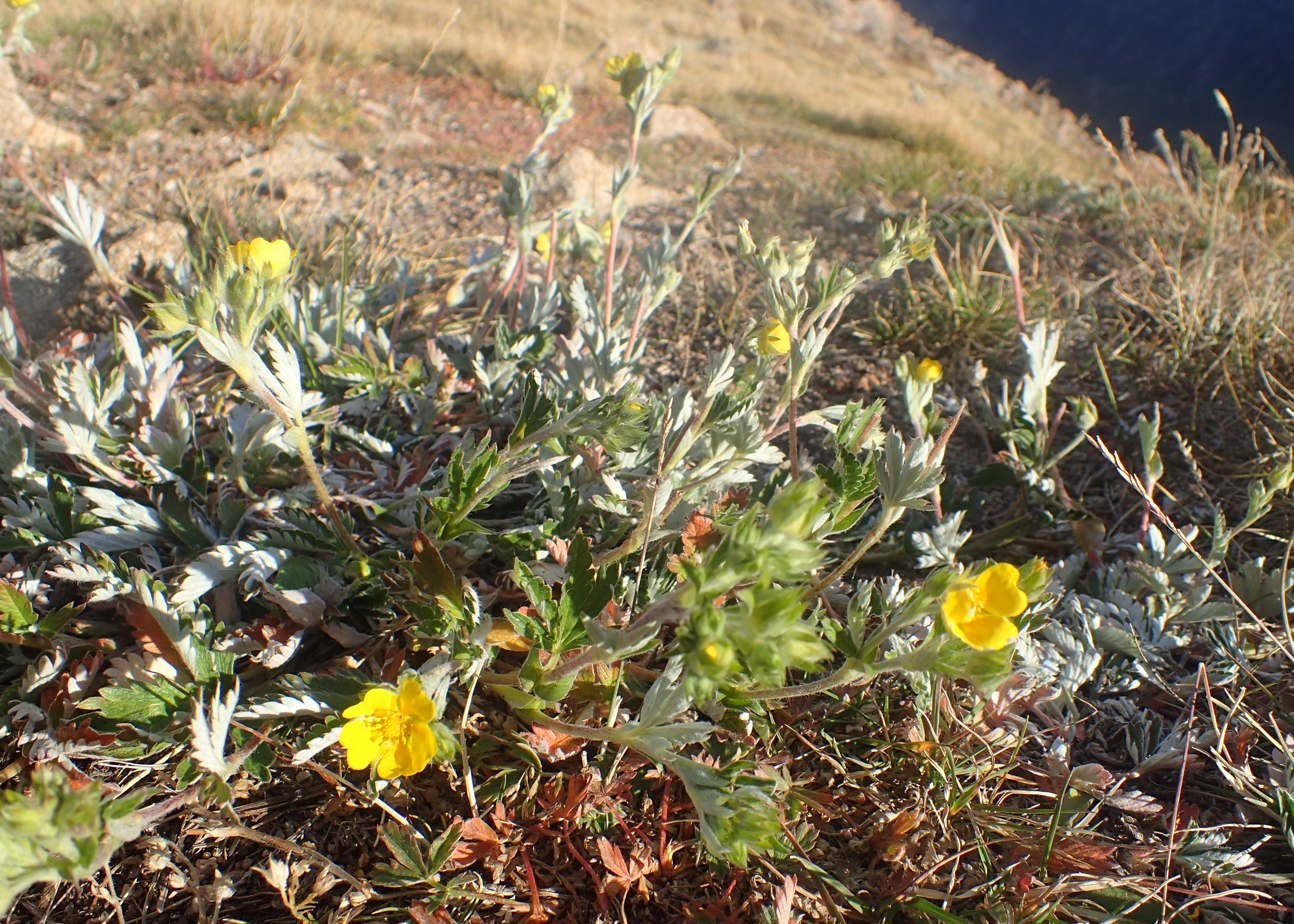
- Habit

Scientific classification
- Kingdom: Plantae
- Clade: Tracheophytes
- Clade: Angiosperms
- Clade: Eudicots
- Clade: Rosids
- Order: Rosales
- Family: Rosaceae
- Genus: Potentilla
- Species: P. pulcherrima

Binomial name
- Potentilla pulcherrima Lehm.

Synonyms
- List: Pentaphyllum pulcherrimum (Lehm.) Nieuwl. & Lunell; Potentilla camporum Rydb.; Potentilla filipes Rydb.; Potentilla gracilis var. filipes (Rydb.) B.Boivin; Potentilla gracilis var. pulcherrima (Lehm.) Fernald; Potentilla hippiana var. pulcherrima (Lehm.) S.Watson; Potentilla pensylvanica var. pulcherrima (Lehm.) Torr. & A.Gray; Potentilla pulcherrima var. communis Th.Wolf; Potentilla pulcherrima var. condensata Th.Wolf; Potentilla pulcherrima var. filipes (Rydb.) Th.Wolf; Potentilla pulcherrima var. subpinnata Th.Wolf; Potentilla pulcherrima var. wardii (Greene) Soják; Potentilla wardii Greene

= Potentilla pulcherrima =

Species of plant

Potentilla pulcherrima (syn. Potentilla gracilis var. pulcherrima), the beautiful cinquefoil, soft cinquefoil, or whiteleaf cinquefoil, is a species of flowering plant in the family Rosaceae. It is native to Canada, and the north and west-central United States, with a disjunct population in Connecticut. Noted for the shiny abaxial surfaces of its leaves, it is a perennial shrub reaching 30 in (76 cm) with yellow flowers.

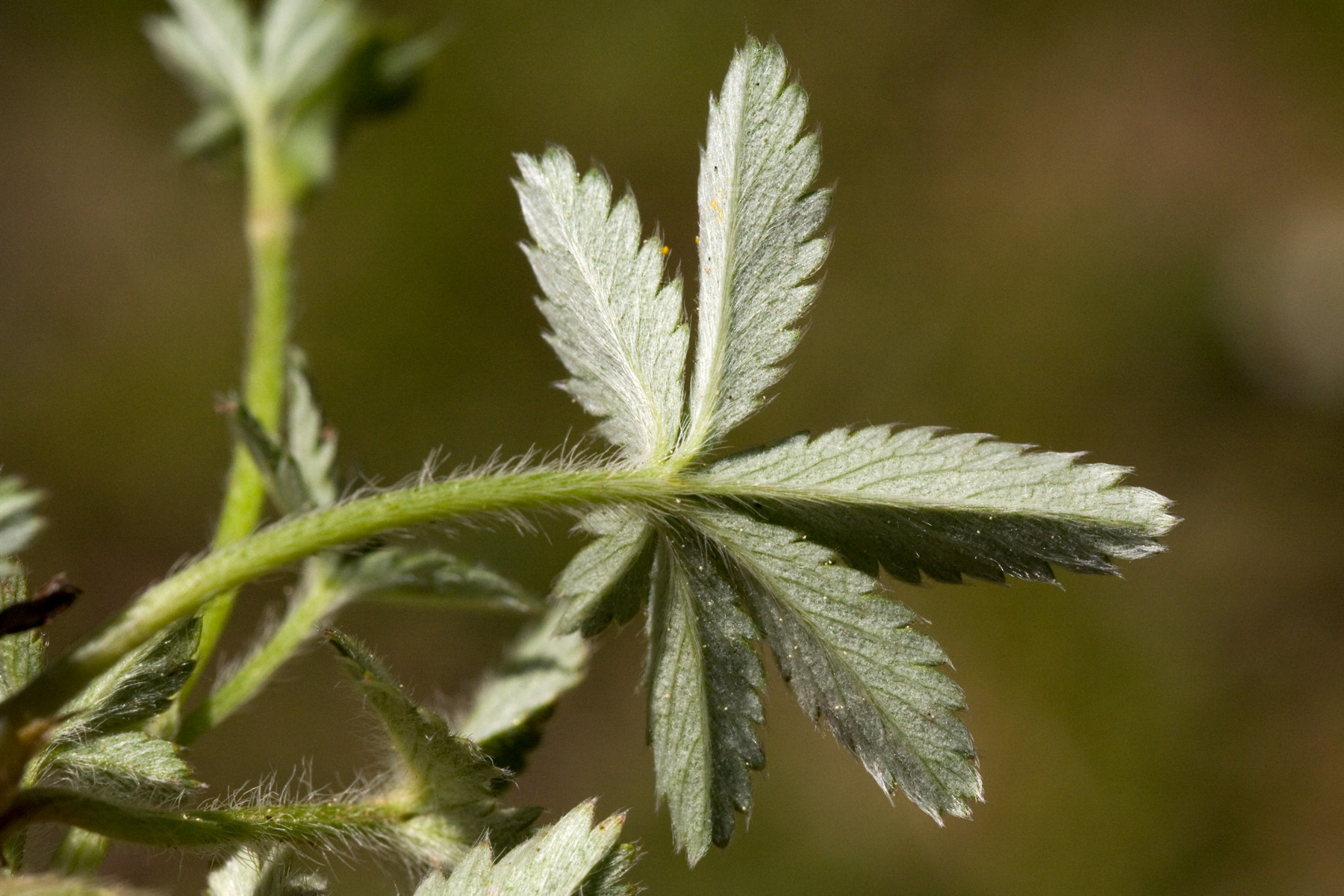
Undersides of leaves are quite silvery
