= Native American languages of Colorado =

Colorado, a state in the western United States that straddles the heights of the Rocky Mountains and the western edges of the Great Plains, has been the traditional home of several Uto-Aztecan, Algonquian, and Tanoan tribes. However, all tribes except for bands of the Ute were relocated to other states, primarily Wyoming and Oklahoma, during the Westward Expansion of the late nineteenth and early twentieth centuries.

As such, in total, there is only one remaining Native American language spoken in Colorado: Colorado River Numic. The language spoken by the Ute is classified as part of the Shoshonean group of Uto-Aztecan languages.

== Distribution ==
There is only one Native American language currently spoken in Colorado. Population estimates are based on figures from Ethnologue and U.S. Census data, as given in sub-pages below. The language is shown in the table below:

Language	Classification	Number of Speakers	Total Ethnic Population	Tribe(s) Included	Location(s) in Colorado	Significant External Populations
Colorado River Numic	Uto-Aztecan: Numic: Southern Numic	2,000	5,000	Ute: Ute Mountain, Southern Ute	Ute Mountain Indian Reservation, Southern Ute Indian Reservation	Nevada, Utah, Arizona, California

== See also ==
- Native Americans in the United States
- Indigenous languages of the Americas
- Uto-Aztecan languages
