= Louis Forniquet Henderson =

American botanist (1853–1942)

Louis Forniquet Henderson (September 17, 1853 – June 14, 1942) was an American botanist.

== Early life ==
Louis Henderson, grandson of U.S. Senator John Henderson of Mississippi, was born in Roxbury, Massachusetts, United States, on September 17, 1853. His father, John Henderson Jr., was a New Orleans lawyer. His mother, Catharine Leland, belonged to a prominent Massachusetts family. His older brother, John Leland Henderson, was born in Boston, Massachusetts, in 1851. His father, who was a supporter of Lincoln, was murdered shortly after the Civil War, at which time, his mother took Louis and his brother John north. Henderson attended Cornell University, studying languages and botany. He arrived in Oregon in 1877 and became a teacher at Portland High School. Six years later, he married fellow teacher Kate Robinson; the couple had two daughters.

== Botanical career ==
Henderson became one of the first botany professors at the University of Idaho in 1893. While there he taught as many as 8 classes per week. He made several field expeditions while at Idaho and published four new species. He acquired over 10,000 samples for the university's herbarium between 1893 and 1906. The herbarium burned to the ground on March 30, 1906. Nonetheless, he continued in academia for several years afterward and some of his work survived through exchanges he had made with other herbariums.

Henderson was considered one of the most knowledgeable botanists of the northwest United States at the time of his death. Over his career he cataloged 64 different taxa.

== Death ==
Henderson died in a Puyallup nursing home on June 14, 1942, at the age of 88.

== Legacy ==
Northwest plant species named after Louis Forniquet Henderson include Agrostis hendersonii, Angelica hendersonii, Cryptantha hendersonii, Dodecatheon hendersonii, Erythronium hendersonii, Horkelia hendersonii, Petrophytum hendersonii, Phlox hendersonii, and Sidalcea hendersonii.

Mount Henderson in the Olympic Mountains is named after him.
