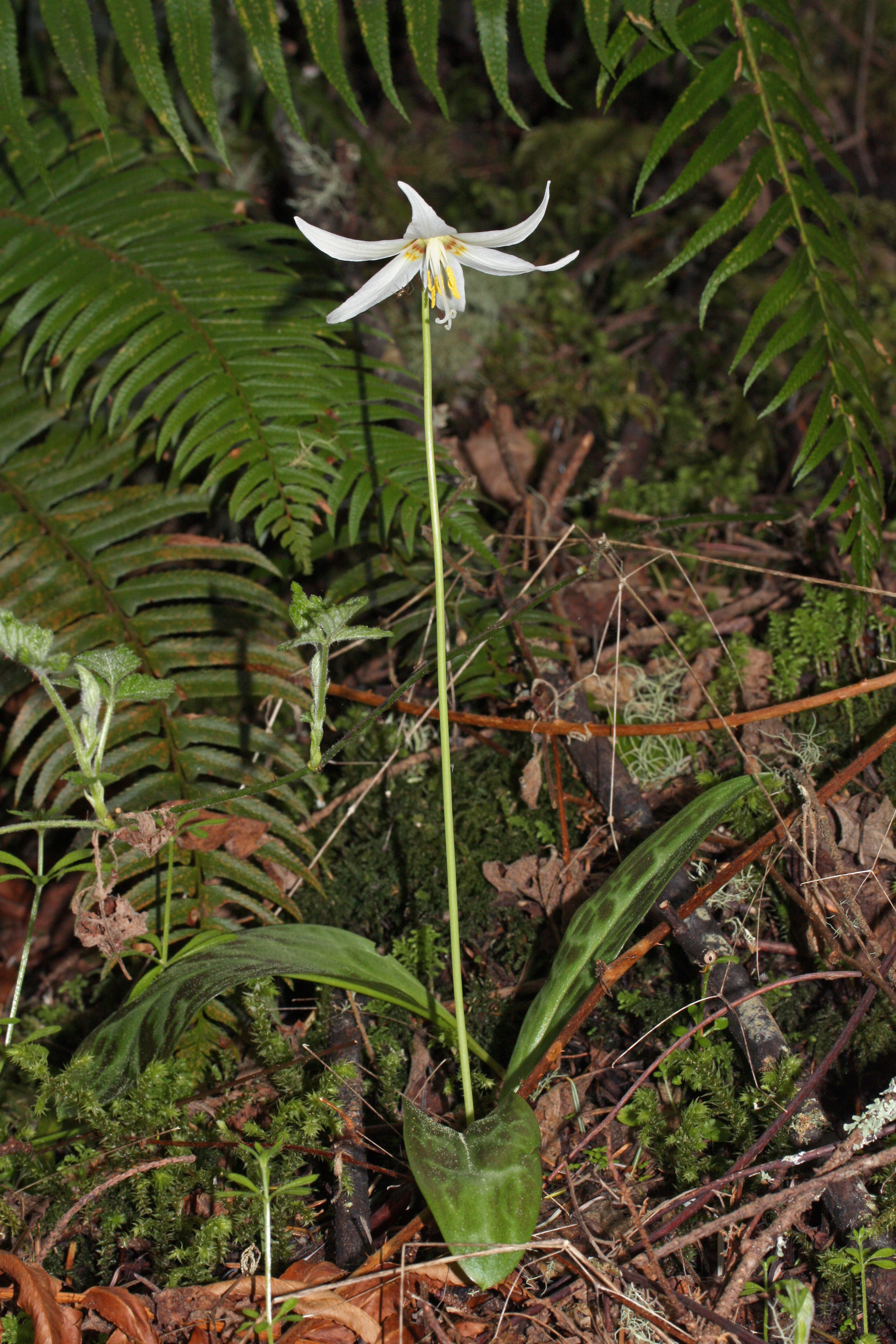

Conservation status
- Secure (NatureServe)

Scientific classification
- Kingdom: Plantae
- Clade: Tracheophytes
- Clade: Angiosperms
- Clade: Monocots
- Order: Liliales
- Family: Liliaceae
- Subfamily: Lilioideae
- Genus: Erythronium
- Species: E. oregonum

Binomial name
- Erythronium oregonum Applegate

Synonyms
- Synonymy: Erythronium revolutum var. albiflorum Purdie; Erythronium revolutum var. praecox Purdy; Erythronium revolutum var. watsonii Purdy; Erythronium giganteum subsp. leucandrum Applegate; Erythronium oregonum subsp. leucandrum (Applegate) Applegate

= Erythronium oregonum =

Species of flowering plant

Erythronium oregonum is a North American species of flowering plant in the lily family which is known by the common name giant white fawnlily or Oregon fawn-lily.

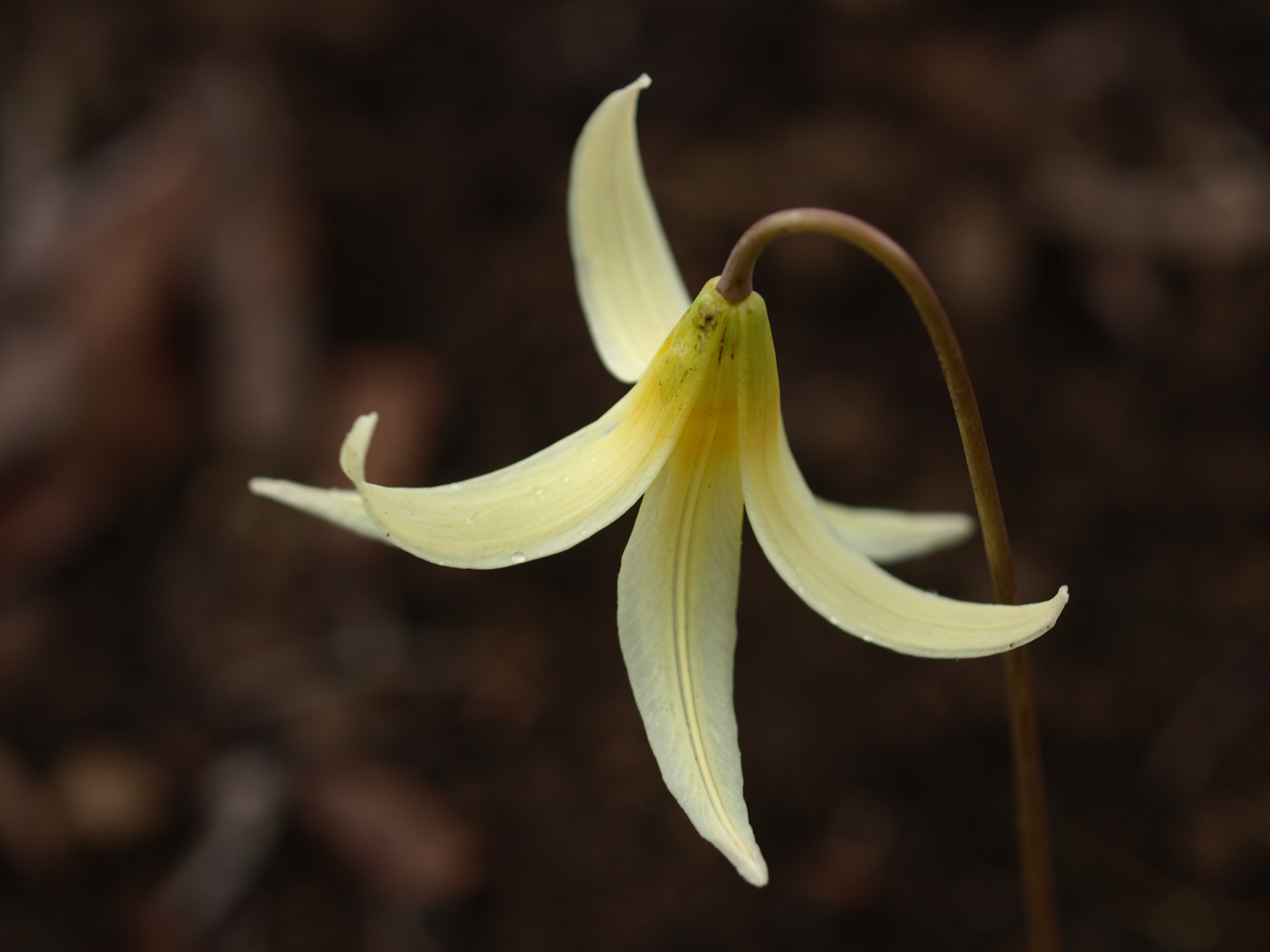
Erythronium oregonum flower

It is native to western North America, where it grows in the Pacific Coast Ranges from southwestern British Columbia to northern California.

== Distribution and habitat ==
In North America from southern British Columbia south to northern California, west of the Cascade Range to the Coast Range and Siskiyous. It grows in meadows, rocky outcrops, and coniferous forests.

== Description ==
Erythronium oregonum is wildflower growing from a bulb 3 to 5 centimeters wide and produces basal, lance-shaped green leaves up to 22 centimeters long and often mottled with brown and white. Thin naked stalks reach up to about 40 centimeters in height, each bearing one flower or sometimes more.

Each flower has white tepals with yellow bases, sometimes streaked with dull red. The flower is often nodding, facing the ground. Its tepals are recurved so their points face upward. The stamens and stigma are white and the anthers may be white to yellow. They are pollinated by beetles and flies.

== Uses ==
Bears have been known to eat the entire plant.

Native Americans ate the roots raw or cooked.

== History ==
"John Burroughs is said to have named this species 'fawn lily' because he thought the two leaves looked like the pricked ears of a fawn. More likely, 'fawn' alludes to the mottled leaf coloring."
