= Morton Peck =

American botanist (1871–1959)

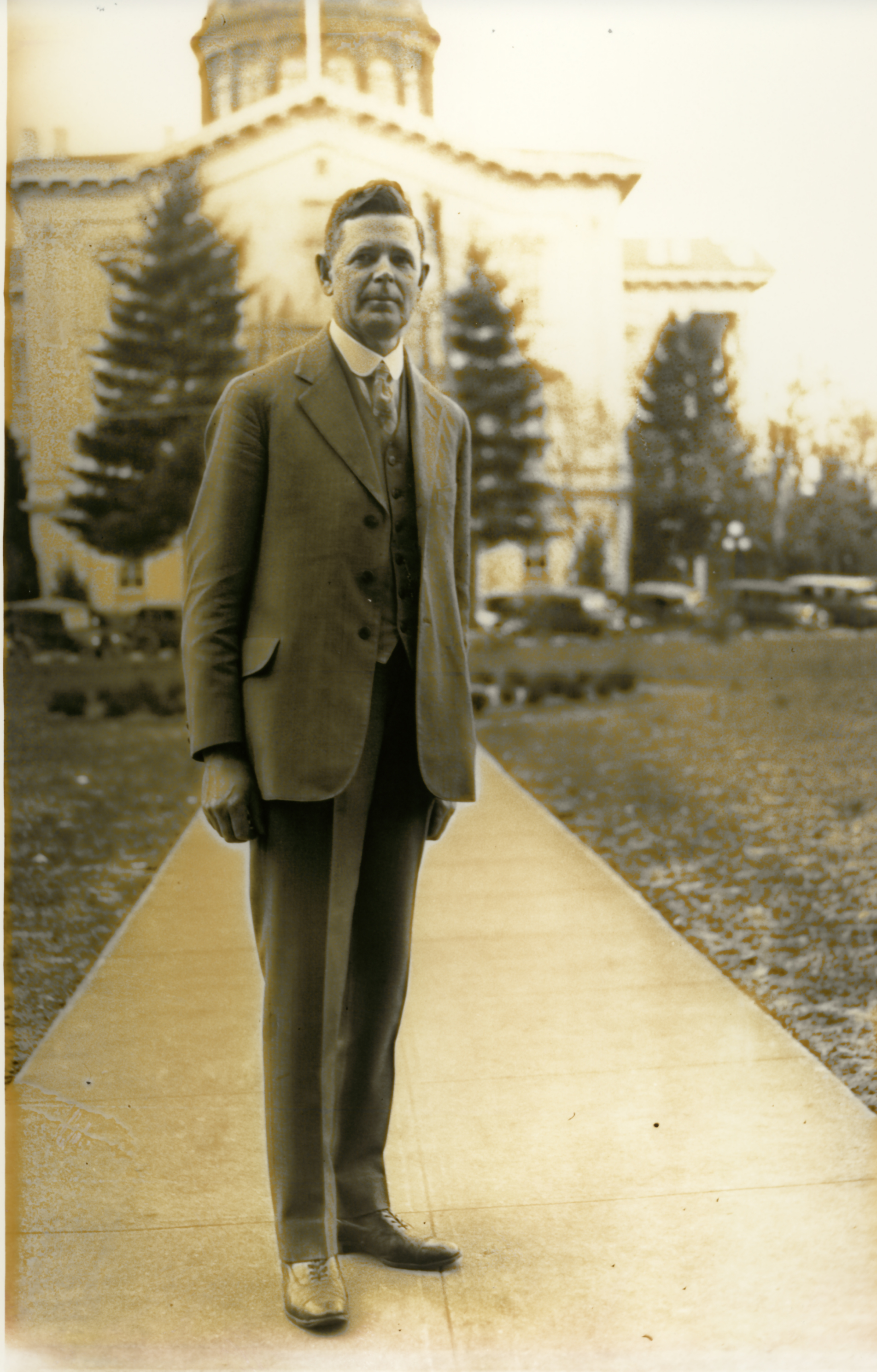
- Born: Morton Eaton Peck; 1871
- Died: 1959 (aged 87–88)
- Occupation: Botanist

Morton Eaton Peck (1871–1959) was an American botanist specializing in flora of Oregon. He was professor of botany at Willamette University. He wrote Manual of the Higher Plants of Oregon. Botanist Arthur Cronquist commented that Peck's Oregon plant collection was "the most complete, so far as I know that exists."
