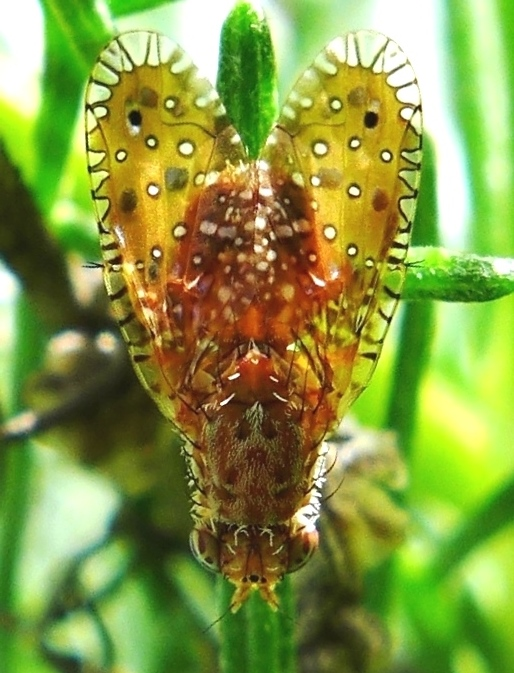

Scientific classification
- Kingdom: Animalia
- Phylum: Arthropoda
- Class: Insecta
- Order: Diptera
- Family: Tephritidae
- Genus: Paracantha
- Species: P. gentilis

Binomial name
- Paracantha gentilis Hering, 1940

Synonyms
- Paracantha mexicana Malloch, 1941; Paracantha mimetica Malloch, 1941; Paracantha mimetica var. elongata Malloch, 1941; Paracantha sobrina Hering, 1940

= Paracantha gentilis =

Species of fly

Paracantha gentilis is a species of tephritid or fruit fly in the genus Paracantha of the family Tephritidae. It has a widespread distribution throughout the Western United States, and has also been found as far south as Mexico and Costa Rica. It most closely resembles Paracantha culta, which is widespread in the Southeastern United States, but P. gentilis can be distinguished by having smaller spots on the head.

== Taxonomic history ==
Paracantha gentilis was first described by Erich Martin Hering in 1940 from a pair of male and female specimens collected in Wyoming. In the same publication, he described Paracantha sobrina from a single female specimen collected in Costa Rica. The following year, John Russell Malloch revised the genus Paracantha, and described three new taxa: P. mimetica, P. mimetica elongata, and P. mexicana. These descriptions all largely relied on wing pattern characters rather than terminalia.

In 1953, Martin Ladislau Aczél again revised the genus Paracantha of the Americas, and found that Malloch's new taxa of Paracantha could all be synonymized with Paracantha gentilis. Once more specimens were collected and examined, and the variation in wing pattern that were used to delimit species represented a gradient of variability rather than discrete groups, and as such Aczél moved mimetica, mimetica elongata, and mexicana to synonymy with gentilis. These synonymies were confirmed by researchers constructing a systematic database of Tephritidae, but in addition the species Paracantha sobrina was synonymized with gentilis; no reasoning is given.

== Immature stages ==
=== Egg ===
The egg of Paracantha gentilis has a long, opaque pedicel that is about twice the size of the egg body; this character is shared with other Paracantha species such as Paracantha trinotata. This pedicel is tubelike, and is always exposed to outside air when oviposited, presumably for respiration. Eggs are usually deposited in a group in the capitula.

=== Larva ===
Once first instar P. gentilis larvae hatch from eggs, each tunnels to a separate floral tube within the immature capitulum and only feeds there for that life stage. Unlike many other Tephritidae, even species in Europe that use Cirsium capitula like Urophora solstitialis, P. gentilis does not cause host plants to form galls or host-tissue growth. At this stage, the median oral lobe is not well defined. First instar larvae always have four spiracular bundles with unbranched hair, which is a character shared with Rachiptera limbata, a member of a genus closely related to Paracantha.

Second-instar larvae are similar to the first-instar larvae, but have more sclerotized mouth hooks than before. This is possibly to assist in their changed food source, as they leave the floral tube and tunnel through more hardened plant material towards the outer margin of the capitulum.

Third-instar larvae arise by the time anthesis occurs in the Cirsium host plant. In terms of morphology, the gnathocephalon becomes cone-shaped, and the mouth hooks further sclerotize and become tridentate. At this stage, the median oral lobe has fully formed between the mouth hooks, consisting of a heavily sclerotized dorsal rib and two projecting flanges. The median oral lobe moves independently of the mouth hooks. Paracantha gentilis is the first species of Tephritidae where the median oral lobe was described; this character has been found to be shared with all other non-frugivorous Tephritinae.

This larval stage avoids intraspecific competition for plant resources based on the density of third-instar P. gentilis larvae within a given capitulum. The first few third-instar larvae will feed at the central ovules of the plant, directly eating plant tissue. When about three to four third-instar larvae are present, they will start moving to the upper receptacle of the capitulum and create depressions in the surface. In this area, they use the median oral lobe for liquid food uptake, extracting sap from the depressions in the upper receptacle.

=== Pupa ===
P. gentilis larvae prepare for pupariaton by turning away from receptacles and facing their head towards the top of the capitula. At the center of the capitula, they begin pupariating, surrounded by a layer of dried, partially consumed florets. Once ready to pupate, P. gentilis expand their ptilinum to break open the puparium, while also pushing apart any dried florets in the way. The teneral adult rests on the outside of the capitula for about a half an hour once pupation has been completed, while excavating dark metabolic waste 1~2 times.

== Behavior and ecology ==
=== Adults ===
Within a given year, two generations of Paracantha gentilis adults appear at Cirsium plants. The first wave consists of overwintered adults that appear in late March to early May, while the second wave consists of same-year adults that emerge in late June. A portion of the population of these emerged adults are reproductively immature and/or inactive in during midsummer, and instead of immediately ovipositing, they move towards higher elevations and remain with non-host plants. This group overwinters, and becomes the first wave of adults the following year.

Reproductively mature Paracantha gentilis adults spend most of their time on Cirsium plants. Both sexes feed on sap at oviposition wounds in thistles, and defend these sap sites from ants by lunging at the intruders while audibly buzzing their wings. When not defending, P. gentilis engages in "agnostic" wing behavior, consisting of slow and asynchronous movements that seemingly don't act as communication. Adults also engage in "bubbling", where liquid is ejected as a bubble from the mouth and then sucked back in; this may act as a method of temperature regulation.

=== Mating ===
Productively mature male Paracantha gentilis engage in territorial behavior on the lower leaves of Cirsium thistles. Special territorial displays occur when an intruding male enters the established territory of another male, with both engaging in copied wing movements and touching labellae. While displaying in their territory, the male may release pheromones from either a distended abdomen, or from a gland on the underside of the maxillary palps.

Males will display on the leaf and wait for a wandering female to pass close by. At that point, if the female is receptive, they will engage in a discrete set of courtship behaviors. Both flies will face each other, and the male will extend his mouthparts out as far as possible, and then produce a drop of off-white liquid on the top of his labellum. The female then watches while the male vibrates the labellum to shake the drop of liquid. If still receptive, the female will approach and extend her own mouthparts, placing it down on the ball of liquid and touching labellae for up to 20 minutes. This trophallaxis process transfers the droplet from the male to the female; of note is that the female can reject the droplet at any time and will leave without ingesting the liquid.

Mating is initiated during the labellum touching by the female extending her ovipositor acleus. The male will break away and position himself behind the female, intermittently touching his foretarsi to the apices of the female's wings. The female, when ready, extend her ovipositor to full length, to which the male responds by mounting the ovipositor dorsally. The ovipositor is so long that the male rides solely on it while female moves. The female then slowly retracts the ovipositor while terminalia are still touching, and the pair moves to a shady leaf and remain in copula for 2.5 to 4 hours.

=== Oviposition ===
It is not known specifically how Paracantha gentilis adults find Cirsium host plants, as during the night they do not stay on these plants but fly to an unknown location, returning shortly after daybreak. However, when moving to another nearby thistle, P. gentilis adults will visually orient their bodies towards the plant before jumping and then flying to their target. This behavior has been observed in another species in the same family, Neotephritis finalis, on Asteraceae.

Mated P. gentilis females will fly from thistle to thistle, probing the center of the capitulum with their ovipositor. Once they find a suitable host plant, they will begin ovipositing 1 to 13 eggs into the capitula. Of note is that P. gentilis does not avoid capitulum already infested with eggs of other females, and will readily deposit eggs in both uninfested and infested capitula.

=== Host plants ===
Paracantha gentilis is only known to use the flowerheads of Cirsium plants as a larval host, where larvae engage in an aggregated attack on the closed capitula. Currently, a total of 19 species (including 8 subspecies) of Cirsium are known to be used as host plants by Paracantha gentilis.

- Cirsium arizonicum (A. Gray) Petr., [as Cirsium nidulum]
- Cirsium brevistylum Cronquist
- Cirsium centaureae (Rydb.) K. Schum.
- Cirsium ciliolatum (L.F. Hend.) J. T. Howell
- Cirsium cymosum (Greene) J.T. Howell
- Cirsium douglasii DC.
- Cirsium edule Nutt.
- Cirsium fontinale (Greene) Jeps. var. campylon (H. Sharsm.) Pilz ex Keil & C. Turner, [as Cirsium campylon]
- Cirsium hydrophilum (Greene) Jeps. var vaseyi (A. Gray) J.T. Howell
- Cirsium mexicanum DC.
- Cirsium mohavense (Greene) Petr.
- Cirsium occidentale (Nutt.) Jeps.
  - var. californicum (A. Gray) Keil & C. Turner, (as Cirsium californicum)
  - var. candidissimum (Greene) J.F. Macbr., (as Cirsium pastoris)
  - var. occidentale
  - var. venustum (Greene) Jeps., (as Cirsium proteanum)
- Cirsium ochrocentrum A. Gray
- Cirsium parryi (A. Gray) Petr.
- Cirsium remotifolium (Hook.) DC., (as Cirsium callilepis)
- Cirsium scariosum Nutt.
  - var. americanum (as Cirsium tioganum)
  - var. coloradense (as Cirsium coloradense)
  - var. congdonii (as Cirsium congdonii)
  - var. scariosum
- Cirsium texanum Buckley
- Cirsium undulatum (Nutt.) Spreng.
- Cirsium vulgare (Savi) Ten.

"Cirsium sierrae-bernadino" has been reported as a host plant, but this is not a valid species of Cirsium. This record may be an erroneous name for Cirsium occidentale var. californicum. Also, Paracantha culta has been reported as being injurious to the flowerheads of globe artichoke in California, but P. culta does not appear in this state. As such, this record may be referring to P. gentilis, but no subsequent descriptions of damaging behavior on this non-Cirsium host plant have been reported since.

== Interaction with other species ==
=== Parasitoids ===
Pteromalus canadensis, a microwasp in the family Pteromalidae, is the only reported parasitoid of Paracantha gentilis. The female of P. canadensis seeks out the larvae of P. gentilis and oviposits a single egg into the fly larva. The immature wasp does not kill the fly larva until it develops to pupariation, at which point the P. canadensis larva consumes the pupa. At this point, the wasp uses the hollowed puparium of P. gentilis for its own pupation, where it will emerge in late summer or overwinter into early spring depending on when it completes pupation.

=== Other herbivores ===
Paracantha gentilis uses the same host plant resources as other Tephritidae, both native and introduced. Congener Paracantha genalis occupies a similar distribution to P. gentilis, being widely distributed across the Western United States, but is much rarer in terms of abundance. Little is known of this species' biology, but it appears to also use Cirsium flowerheads. Sister species Paracantha culta also uses Cirsium as a host plant, but is endemic to the Eastern United States. The ranges of P. culta and P. gentilis overlap in Texas, and both have been found at the same site in this region. The only native Cirsium-using Tephritid that is not in this genus is Terellia occidentalis, which has been found to overlap in host plants fairly frequently.

In California, it has been shown that Cirsium flowerheads are attacked by multiple waves of herbivores. Paracantha gentilis is often the first insect to reach the capitula and oviposit, followed by Terellia occidentalis, then Phycitodes mucidella. P. gentilis appears to avoid interspecific competition through attacking earlier than these other two species, and only using the center of the capitula. P. gentilis also gradually surrounds itself with a mixture of dried feces and plant debris, which protects the third instar larval form and puparium.

Multiple introduced species of European Tephritidae have become established in the Western United States, and as a result compete for host plants with native flies. Chaetostomella undosa is one of these adventive Tephritidae, and uses the flowerheads of both native and introduced Cirsium. The flight time of adults overlaps between C. undosa and P. gentilis, and both species oviposit into closed buds. The larvae of these species don't eat the same parts of the flowerhead, but P. gentilis may make the head unusable for C. undosa during the process of consumption. P. gentilis is more prolific with host plant usage, with one study finding 55.6% of seed heads in an area being infested by P. gentilis, versus 5.6% by C. undosa.
