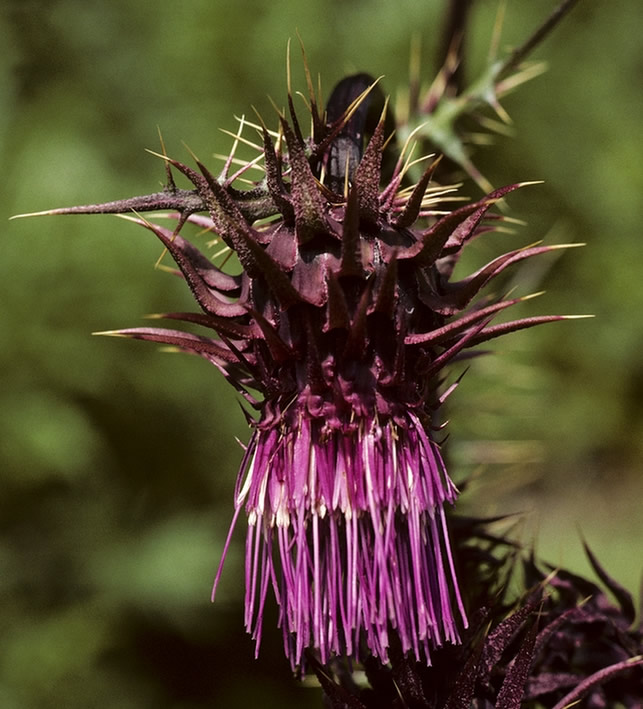

Conservation status
- Critically Imperiled (NatureServe)

Scientific classification
- Kingdom: Plantae
- Clade: Tracheophytes
- Clade: Angiosperms
- Clade: Eudicots
- Clade: Asterids
- Order: Asterales
- Family: Asteraceae
- Genus: Cirsium
- Species: C. vinaceum

Binomial name
- Cirsium vinaceum (Woot. & Standl.) Woot. & Standl.

Synonyms
- Carduus vinaceus Wooton & Standl.

= Cirsium vinaceum =

Species of thistle

Cirsium vinaceum is a rare species of thistle known by the common name Sacramento Mountains thistle. It is endemic to Otero County, New Mexico, in the United States, where it is known only from the Sacramento Mountains. The plant can be found in six canyon systems in a southern section of this mountain range spanning about 32 kilometers. It is rare because it is limited to a specific type of mountain wetland which is both naturally uncommon and threatened by a number of forces. The plant was federally listed as threatened in 1987.

== Description ==
This thistle is a perennial herb which can grow to 200 cm (80 inches) in height. The plant is mostly purple, particularly the stems and inflorescences. The rosetted leaves are up to 50 cm (20 inches) long and are mostly green, edged with yellow spines. Each robust plant produces many flower heads which hang on nodding branches. Flowering occurs during the summer. Each head is 3 to 5 centimeters wide and long and has an involucre of phyllaries which are purple, curve outward, and taper into hard, toothed spines. The head bears many hairlike pinkish purple flowers. The fruit is an achene with a plumelike pappus up to 2 centimeters long. This thistle may resemble musk thistle (Carduus nutans) in appearance.

== Habitat ==
This plant's native habitat is a network of streams and seeps at 8000 feet elevation and above. The plants root in water-filled cracks in the travertine rock of the canyon streams, tolerating constant saturation. They sometimes grow in the streams themselves. The waterways are generally surrounded by meadow habitat and Douglas-fir forests. Other trees in the area include Ponderosa pine (Pinus ponderosa), New Mexico locust (Robinia neomexicana), and Gambel oak (Quercus gambelii). Many populations of the plant are located within the bounds of Lincoln National Forest.

== Endangered status ==
=== Environmental ===
The thistle depends on streams and seeps for its survival. This habitat is threatened with destruction via the diversion of water. The wetland habitat can be damaged by logging, road maintenance, and recreational activity. Livestock range over much of the area and can drastically alter the land by trampling it. The plant once occurred in a wider range of mountain wetland habitat in this area, but now it is mainly limited to steep rocky canyons that are inaccessible to livestock. The effect of livestock on the habitat became clear when animals were excluded from a sensitive area and the thistle proliferated in their absence. Introduced plant species in the area, such as musk thistle and Fuller's teasel (Dipsacus sylvestris), outcompete the native plant. The teasel is perhaps the worst offender; it has been seen sprouting up in the middle of stands of the thistle.

=== Competition ===
A 2010 update suggests that direct plant-plant competition is not a severe problem at this time, but that climate change could encourage it. A number of insects have been noted to feed on the plant, especially favoring the developing fruits in the seed heads. Noted insects include the gall fly Paracantha gentilis, the artichoke plume moth Platyptilia carduidactyla, the bumble flower beetle Euphoria inda, and the stem borer weevil Lixus pervestitus. Large sections of several thistle populations have been damaged by one or more of these insects. The non-native flower head weevil Rhinocyllus conicus has the potential to damage the thistle; it was purposely introduced to North America in an attempt to control various species of invasive thistles which are noxious weeds, including musk thistle. The weevil was never released in New Mexico because of its potential to attack the native thistle; unfortunately, it has moved into the area on its own. So far its distribution is limited but it is expected to spread. The extent of the expected damage to the species is not known.

=== Extent ===
At the time the plant was added to the endangered species list there were about 20 populations left for a total of up to 15,000 plants. It is sometimes difficult to determine the bounds of a population and to count the number of biological individuals within it. This plant, which grows in or near water, undergoes aquatic seed dispersal; it drops seeds which then float downstream to root far from the mother plant. Depending on what defines a population in this particular species, what appears to be many separate patches of plants all the way down a particular waterway might be called a single population. This becomes important if a number of populations is a criterion for protection of the species. Furthermore, the plant often reproduces vegetatively via rhizome; what appears to be a large stand of a great many plants may truly be one genetic individual and its clones. This becomes important in estimating the genetic diversity of the species.

== Protected status ==
When the thistle's federal protection status was reviewed in 2010, it was determined that there were fewer sites occupied by the plant, fewer populations, and usually fewer stems or individuals at known survey sites. Most of the same threats occur now that occurred at the time of listing. The Fish and Wildlife Service does not recommend a change to the plant's protection status.
