= E. fulgida =

E. fulgida may refer to:

- Eatonina fulgida, a sea snail
- Ereunetea fulgida, a geometer moth
- Euphoria fulgida, a scarab beetle
