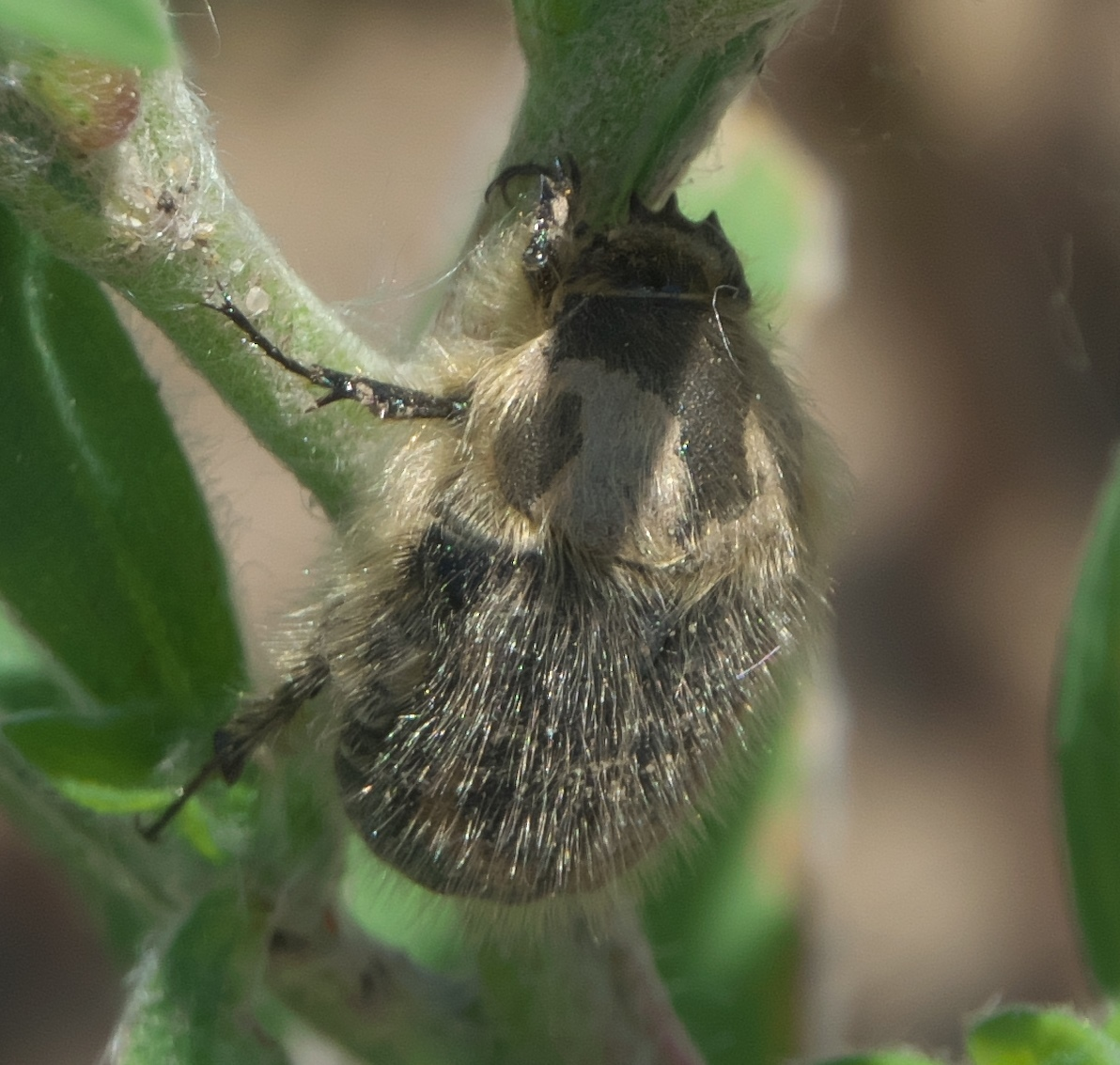
- Euphoria pilipennis, Kansas

Scientific classification
- Domain: Eukaryota
- Kingdom: Animalia
- Phylum: Arthropoda
- Class: Insecta
- Order: Coleoptera
- Suborder: Polyphaga
- Infraorder: Scarabaeiformia
- Family: Scarabaeidae
- Genus: Euphoria
- Species: E. pilipennis

Binomial name
- Euphoria pilipennis (Kraatz, 1883)

= Euphoria pilipennis =

Species of beetle

Euphoria pilipennis is a species of scarab beetle in the family Scarabaeidae. It is found in the central United States.
