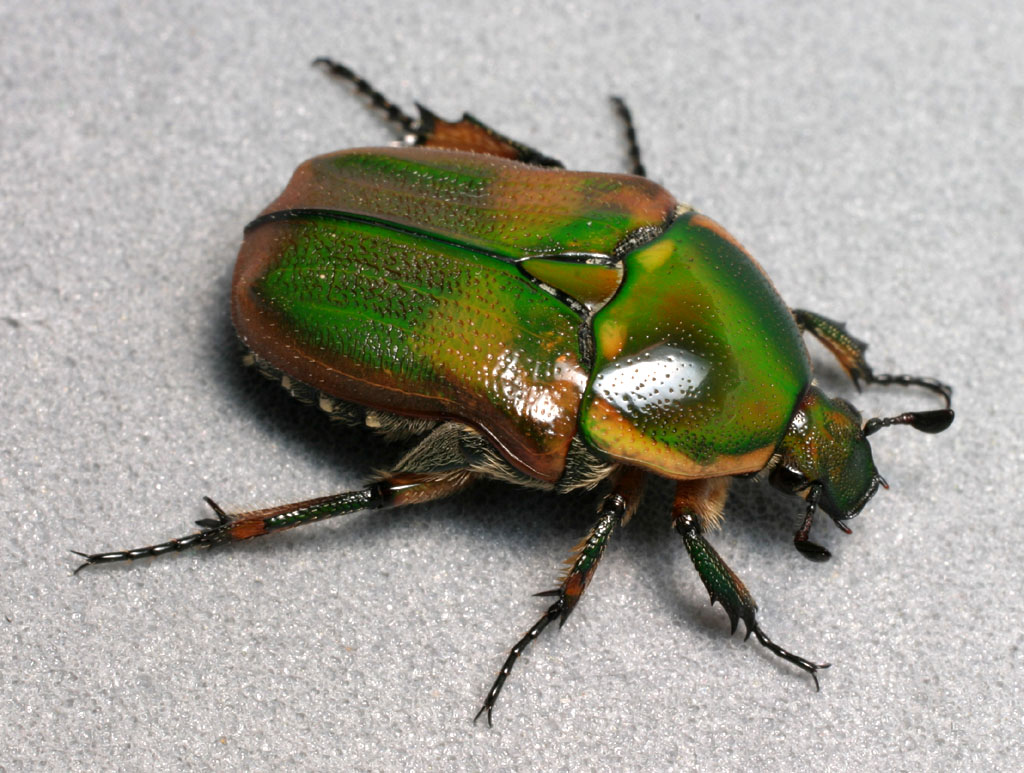
- Euphoria fulgida

Scientific classification
- Domain: Eukaryota
- Kingdom: Animalia
- Phylum: Arthropoda
- Class: Insecta
- Order: Coleoptera
- Suborder: Polyphaga
- Infraorder: Scarabaeiformia
- Family: Scarabaeidae
- Tribe: Cetoniini
- Genus: Euphoria; Burmeister, 1842

Species
- 59, see text

Synonyms
- Euphoriopsis

= Euphoria (beetle) =

Genus of beetles

Euphoria is a genus of scarab beetles in the subfamily Cetoniinae, the flower or fruit chafers. They are native to the Americas, where they are distributed from Canada to Argentina. They are most diverse in Mexico and Central America. As of 2012, there are 59 species in the genus.

== Description and biology ==
Euphoria species can be highly variable in color and pattern making species identification difficult.

The larvae are generally found buried a few centimeters deep in soil rich in organic matter such as compost, dung, animal burrows, packrat middens, and ant nests. In at least some species, the pupa develops in a subterranean cell with a thin wall made of feces mixed with soil. Some species overwinter as adults, and others as larvae.

== Diversity ==
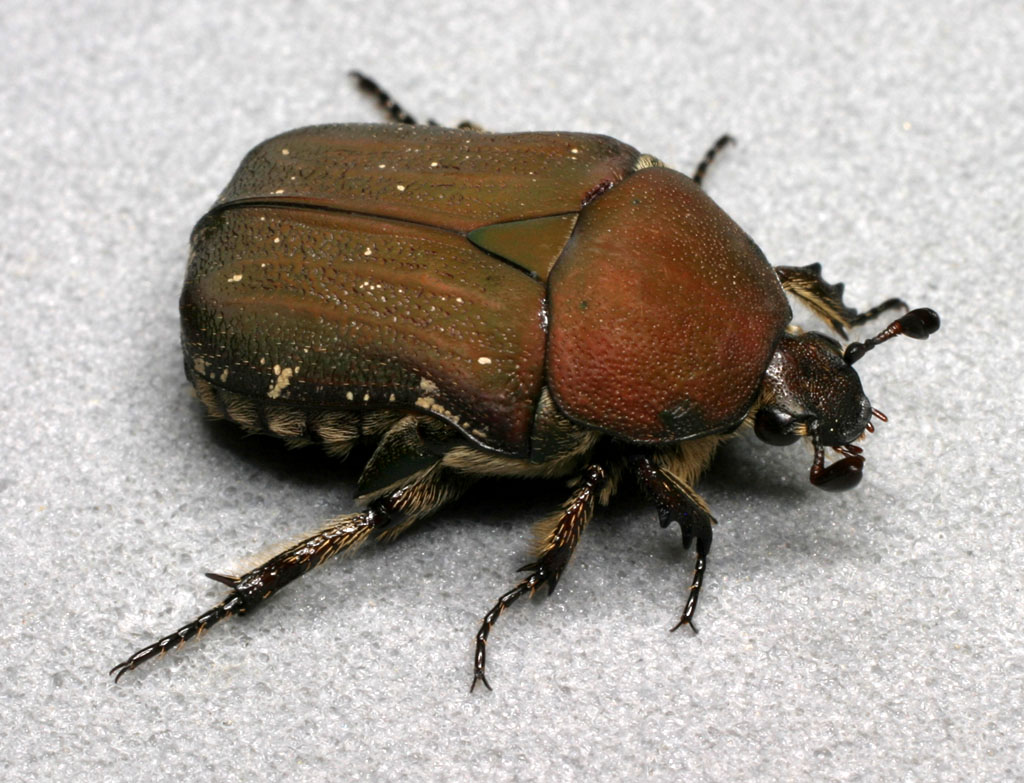
Euphoria herbacea

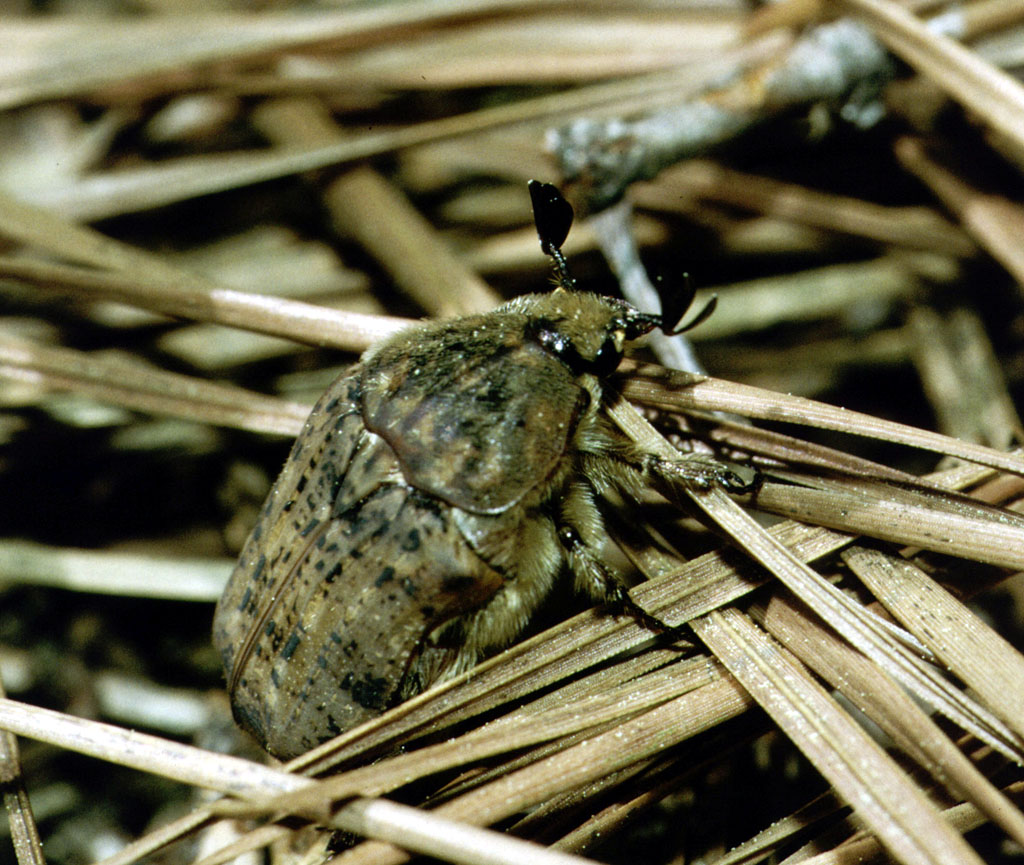
Euphoria inda

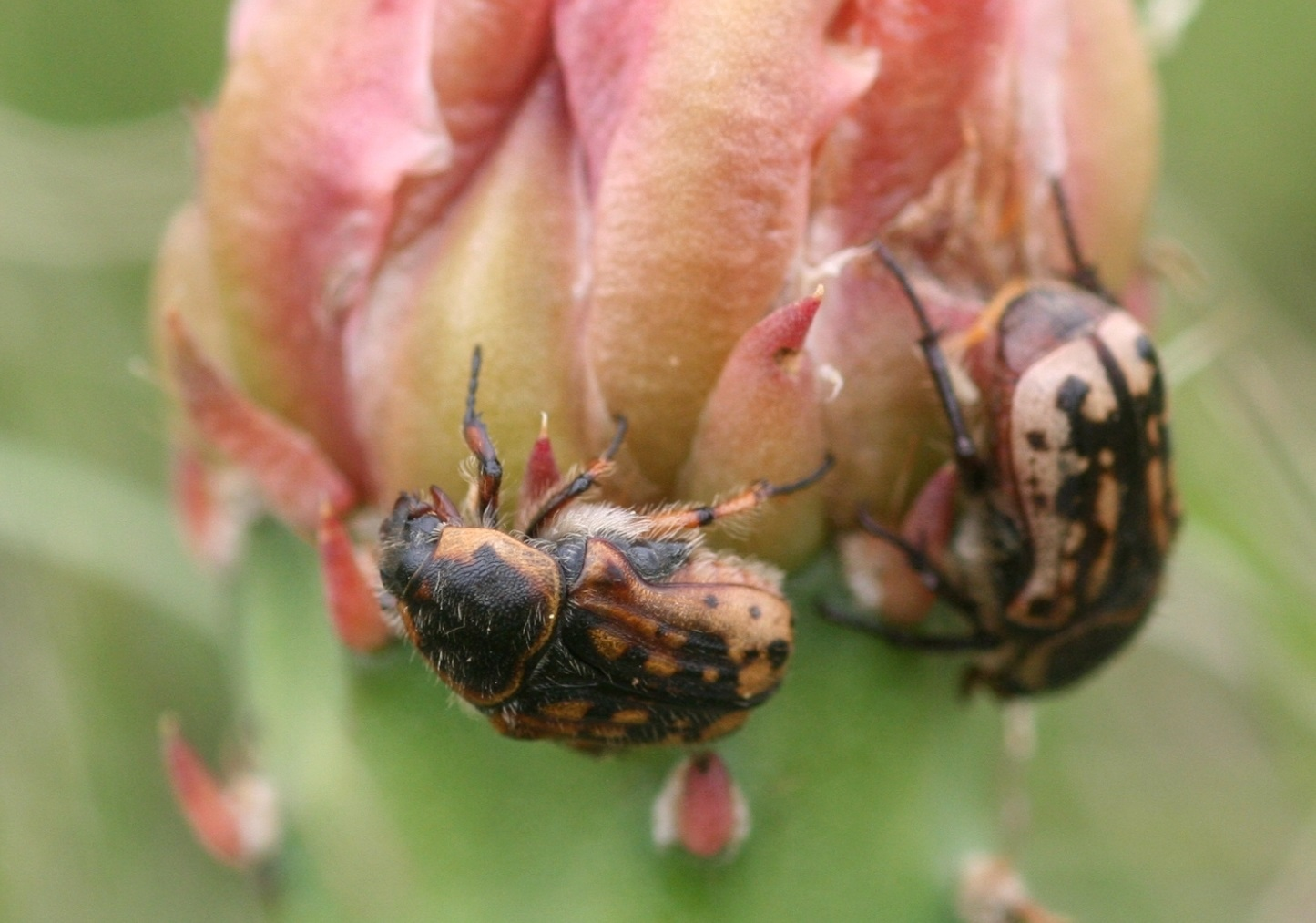
Euphoria kernii

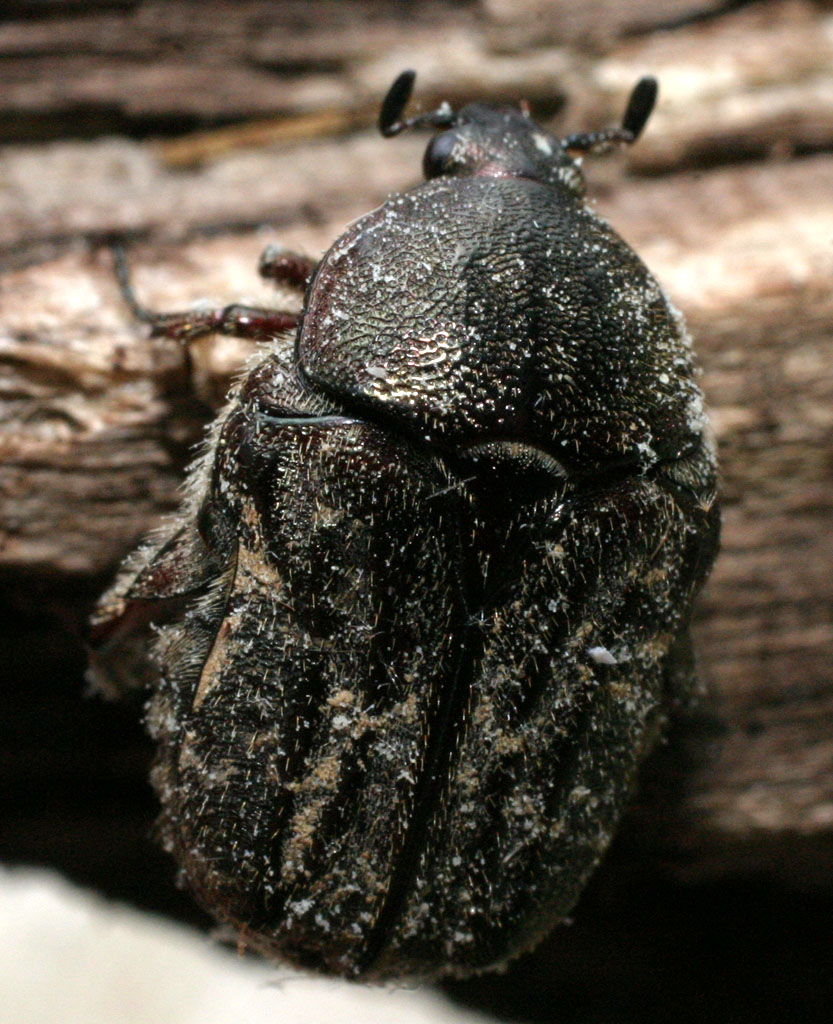
Euphoria sepulcralis

Species include:

- Euphoria abreona
- Euphoria anneae
- Euphoria areata
- Euphoria avita
- Euphoria basalis
- Euphoria biguttata
- Euphoria bispinis
- Euphoria boliviensis
- Euphoria candezei
- Euphoria canaliculata
- Euphoria canescens
- Euphoria casselberryi
- Euphoria chontalensis
- Euphoria devulsa
- Euphoria dimidiata
- Euphoria diminuta
- Euphoria discicollis
- Euphoria eximia
- Euphoria fascifera
- Euphoria fulgida
- Euphoria fulveola
- Euphoria geminata
- Euphoria hera
- Euphoria herbacea
- Euphoria hidrocalida
- Euphoria hirtipes
- Euphoria histrionica
- Euphoria humilis
- Euphoria inda
- Euphoria iridescens
- Euphoria kernii
- Euphoria lacandona
- Euphoria leprosa
- Euphoria lesueuri
- Euphoria leucographa
- Euphoria levinotata
- Euphoria limbalis
- Euphoria lurida
- Euphoria mayita
- Euphoria montana
- Euphoria monticola
- Euphoria mystica
- Euphoria nicaraguensis
- Euphoria paradisiaca
- Euphoria pilipennis
- Euphoria pulchella
- Euphoria quadricollis
- Euphoria schotti
- Euphoria sepulcralis
- Euphoria sonorae
- Euphoria steinheili
- Euphoria subguttata
- Euphoria submaculosa
- Euphoria subtomentosa
- Euphoria vestita
- Euphoria verticalis
- Euphoria vittata
- Euphoria westermanni
- Euphoria yucateca
