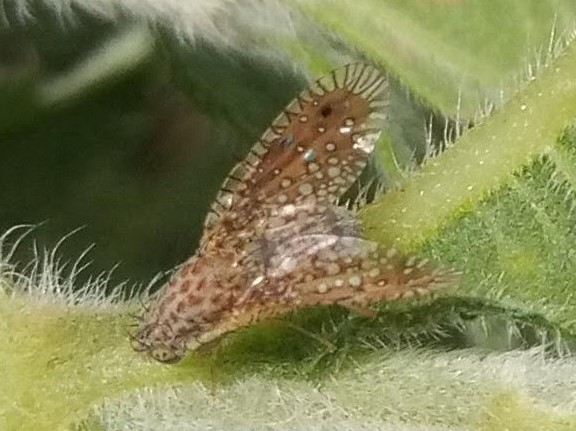

Scientific classification
- Kingdom: Animalia
- Phylum: Arthropoda
- Clade: Pancrustacea
- Class: Insecta
- Order: Diptera
- Family: Tephritidae
- Subfamily: Tephritinae
- Tribe: Eutretini
- Genus: Paracantha
- Species: P. haywardi

Binomial name
- Paracantha haywardi Aczél, 1952

= Paracantha haywardi =

Species of fly

Paracantha haywardi is a species of tephritid or fruit flies in the family Tephritidae.

== Distribution ==
Bolivia, Argentina.
