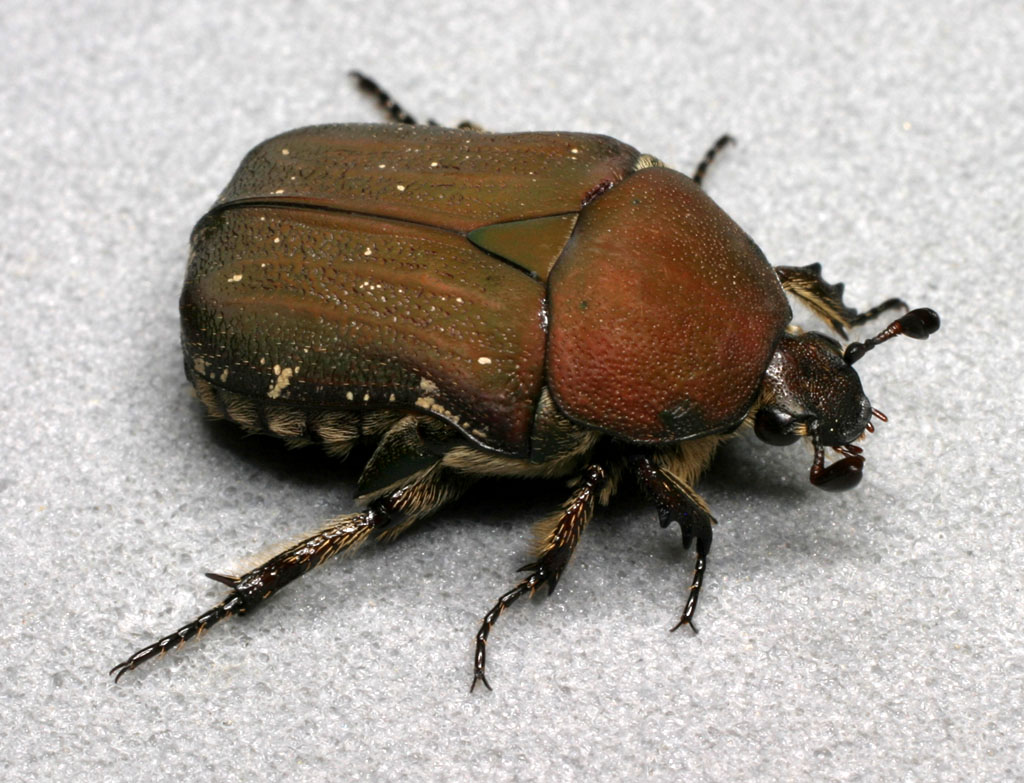

Scientific classification
- Kingdom: Animalia
- Phylum: Arthropoda
- Clade: Pancrustacea
- Class: Insecta
- Order: Coleoptera
- Suborder: Polyphaga
- Infraorder: Scarabaeiformia
- Family: Scarabaeidae
- Genus: Euphoria
- Species: E. herbacea

Binomial name
- Euphoria herbacea (Olivier, 1789)

= Euphoria herbacea =

Species of beetle

Euphoria herbacea is a species of scarab beetle in the subfamily Cetoniinae. It is 15–16 millimetres (0.59–0.63 in) long and is olive-green in color. It is native to the United States, primarily in the central plains and the east of the Mississippi River.
