= Euphoria discicollis =

Scientific classification
- Domain: Eukaryota
- Kingdom: Animalia
- Phylum: Arthropoda
- Class: Insecta
- Order: Coleoptera
- Suborder: Polyphaga
- Infraorder: Scarabaeiformia
- Family: Scarabaeidae
- Genus: Euphoria
- Species: E. discicollis

Binomial name
- Euphoria discicollis (Thomson, 1878)

Synonyms
- Euphoria aestuosa Horn, 1880; Stephanucha atrata Thomson, 1878

Species of beetle

Euphoria discicollis, the pocket gopher flower beetle, is a species of scarab beetle in the family Scarabaeidae.
