= Euphoria casselberryi =

Scientific classification
- Domain: Eukaryota
- Kingdom: Animalia
- Phylum: Arthropoda
- Class: Insecta
- Order: Coleoptera
- Suborder: Polyphaga
- Infraorder: Scarabaeiformia
- Family: Scarabaeidae
- Genus: Euphoria
- Species: E. casselberryi

Binomial name
- Euphoria casselberryi Robinson, 1937

Species of beetle

Euphoria casselberryi is a species of scarab beetle in the family Scarabaeidae.
