= Euphoria quadricollis =

Scientific classification
- Domain: Eukaryota
- Kingdom: Animalia
- Phylum: Arthropoda
- Class: Insecta
- Order: Coleoptera
- Suborder: Polyphaga
- Infraorder: Scarabaeiformia
- Family: Scarabaeidae
- Genus: Euphoria
- Species: E. quadricollis

Binomial name
- Euphoria quadricollis BATES, 1889

Synonyms
- Euphoria arizonica Schaeffer, 1907

Species of beetle

Euphoria quadricollis is a species of scarab beetle in the family Scarabaeidae.
