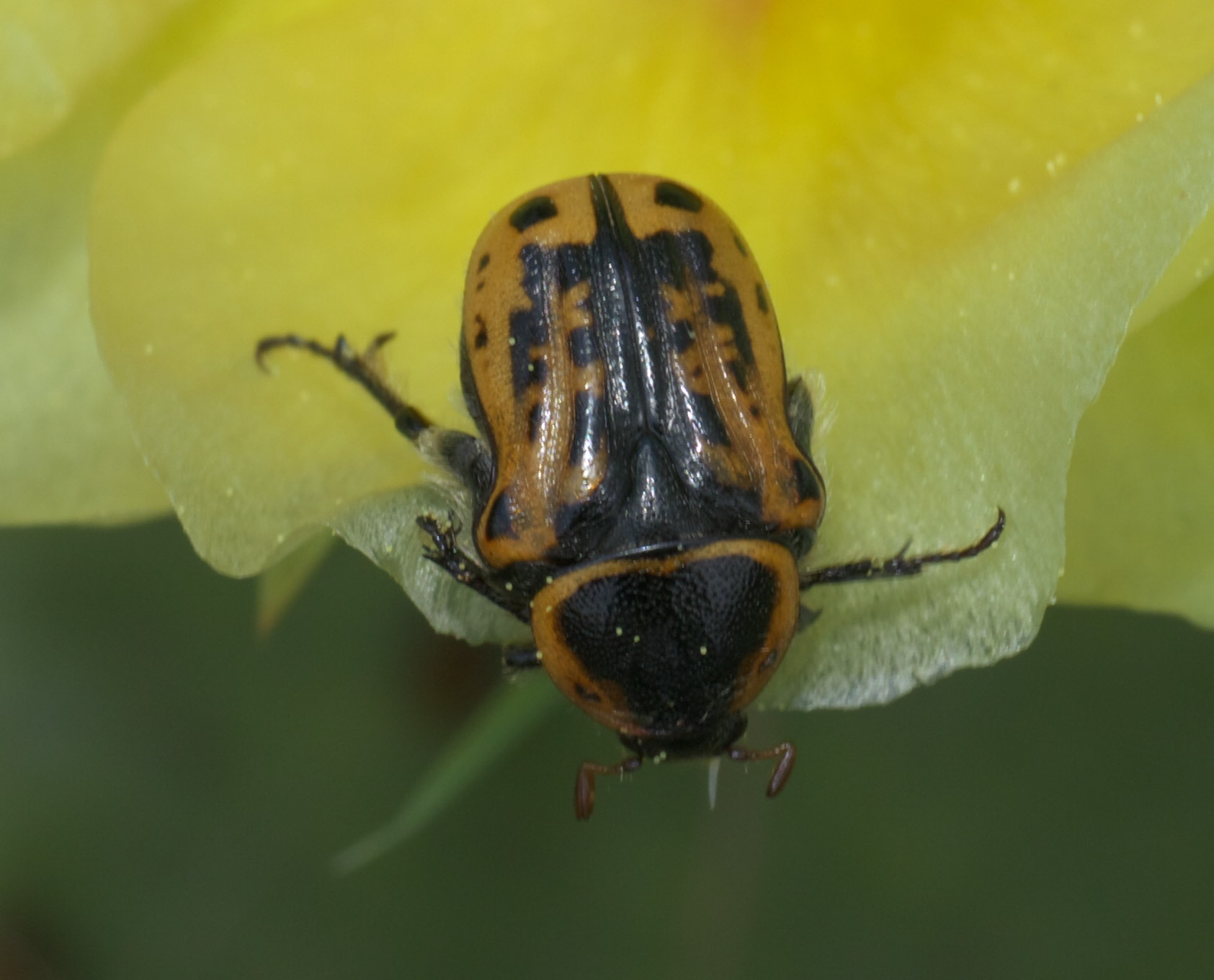

Scientific classification
- Kingdom: Animalia
- Phylum: Arthropoda
- Clade: Pancrustacea
- Class: Insecta
- Order: Coleoptera
- Suborder: Polyphaga
- Infraorder: Scarabaeiformia
- Family: Scarabaeidae
- Genus: Euphoria
- Species: E. kernii

Binomial name
- Euphoria kernii Haldeman, 1852

Synonyms
- Erirhipis clarkii LeConte, 1854; Euphoria connivens Casey, 1915; Euphoria retusa Casey, 1915; Euphoria texana Schaufuss, 1863; Euphoria wichitana Casey, 1915

= Euphoria kernii =

Species of beetle

Euphoria kernii, or Kern's flower scarab, is a species of scarab beetle in the family Scarabaeidae. It was described by American entomologist Samuel Stehman Haldeman in 1852. They are primarily found in Central and West Texas, the central Great Plains and eastern New Mexico of the United States and across northeastern Mexico. The adults are beneficial native pollinators that feed on pollen and nectar from various flowers, including cactus, thistle, yucca, and prickly poppies. The species is not harmful to humans, and they do not bite, sting, or damage property.

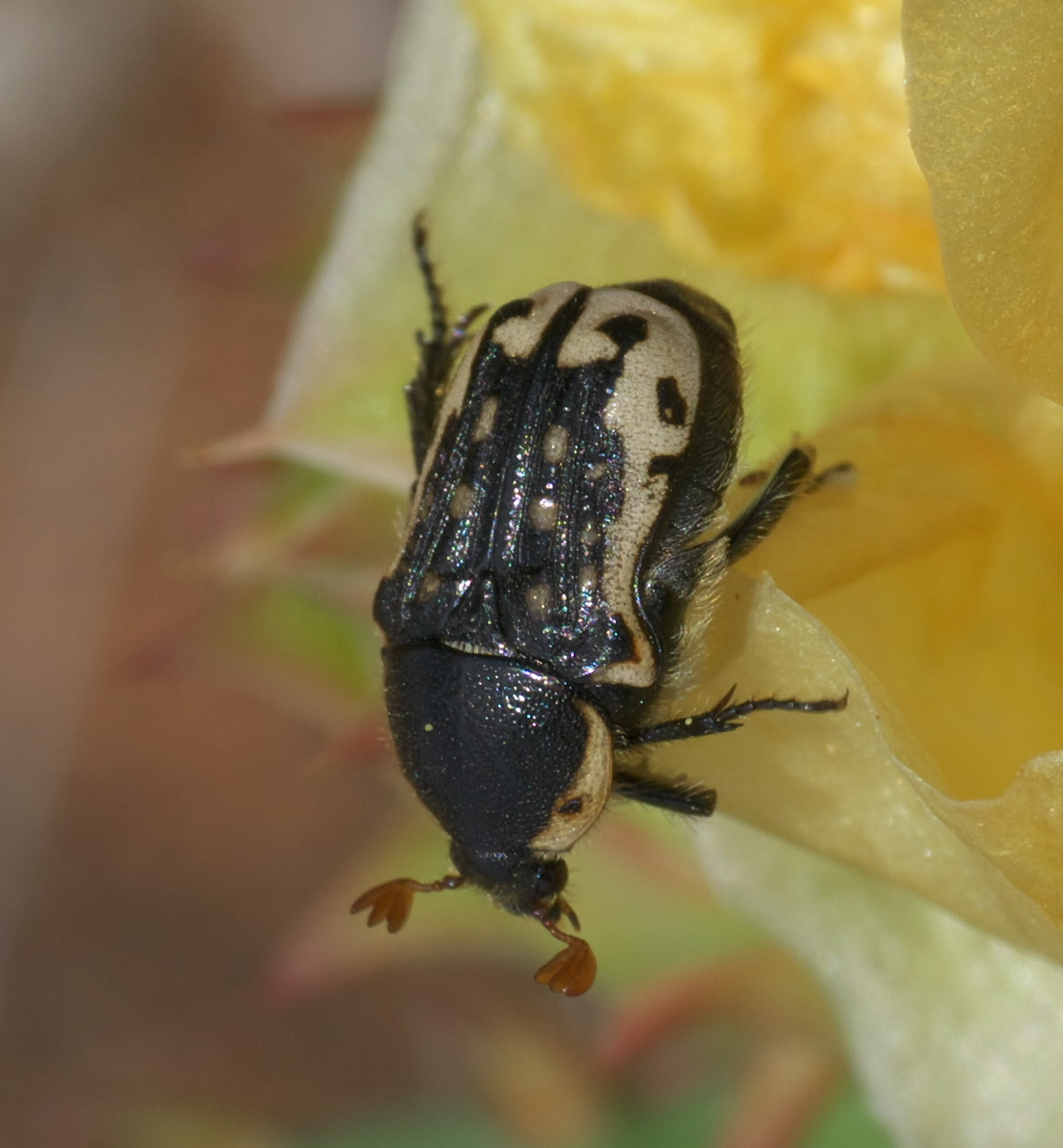
Kern's flower scarab, Euphoria kernii
