= Paracantha ruficallosa =

Scientific classification
- Kingdom: Animalia
- Phylum: Arthropoda
- Class: Insecta
- Order: Diptera
- Family: Tephritidae
- Subfamily: Tephritinae
- Tribe: Eutretini
- Genus: Paracantha
- Species: P. ruficallosa

Binomial name
- Paracantha ruficallosa Hering, 1937

Synonyms
- Neorhabdochaeta anduzei Malloch, 1941

Species of fly

Paracantha ruficallosa is a species of tephritid or fruit flies in the genus Paracantha of the family Tephritidae.

== Distribution ==
Costa Rica, Panama, Venezuela.
