= Paracantha dentata =

Scientific classification
- Kingdom: Animalia
- Phylum: Arthropoda
- Class: Insecta
- Order: Diptera
- Family: Tephritidae
- Subfamily: Tephritinae
- Tribe: Eutretini
- Genus: Paracantha
- Species: P. dentata

Binomial name
- Paracantha dentata Aczél, 1952

Species of fly

Paracantha dentata is a species of tephritid or fruit flies in the genus Paracantha of the family Tephritidae.

== Distribution ==
Peru.
