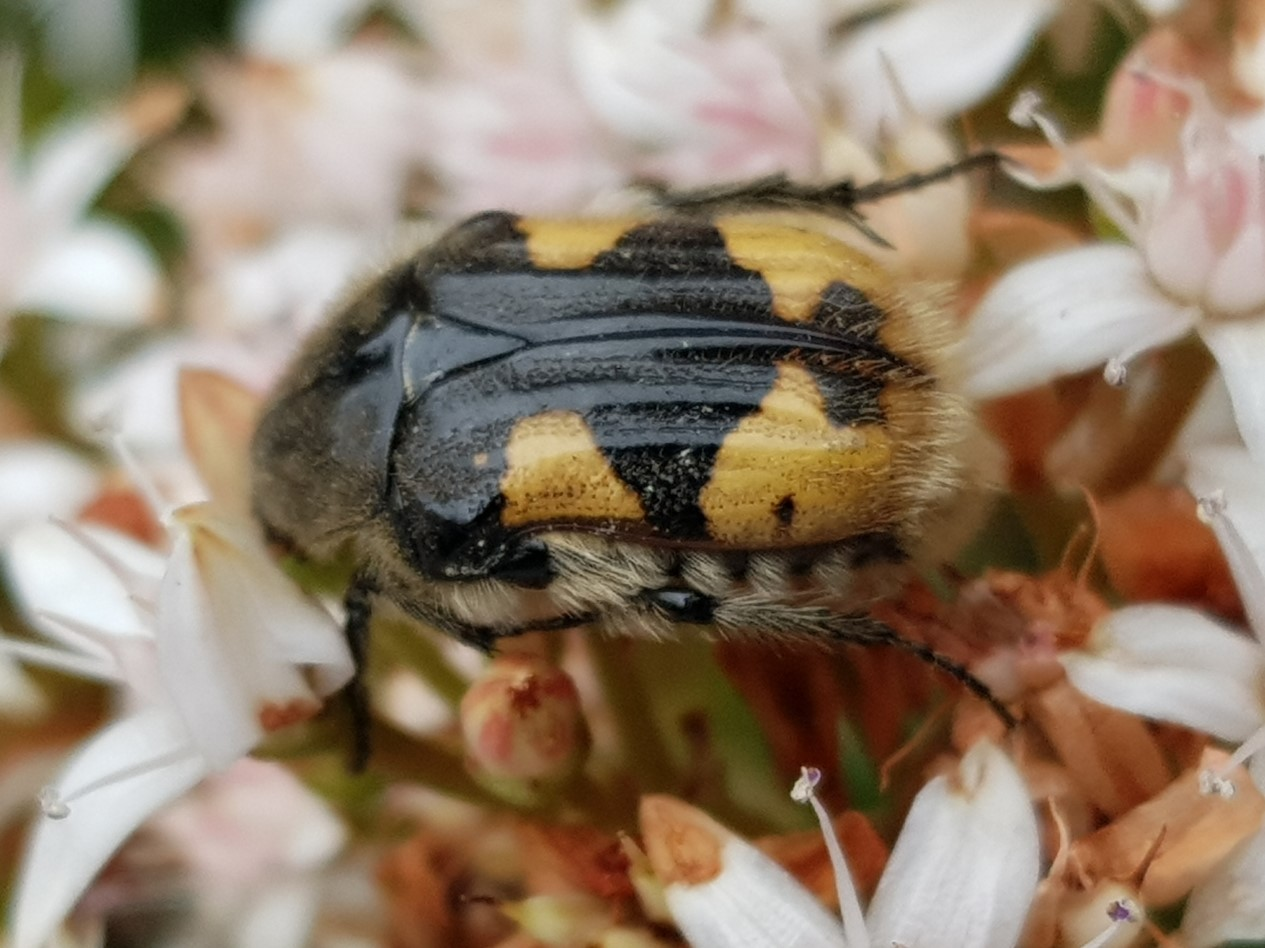

Scientific classification
- Domain: Eukaryota
- Kingdom: Animalia
- Phylum: Arthropoda
- Class: Insecta
- Order: Coleoptera
- Suborder: Polyphaga
- Infraorder: Scarabaeiformia
- Family: Scarabaeidae
- Genus: Euphoria
- Species: E. basalis

Binomial name
- Euphoria basalis (Gory & Percheron, 1833)

Synonyms
- Euphoria crinicauda Casey, 1915

= Euphoria basalis =

Species of beetle

Euphoria basalis is a species of flower chafer beetles in the family Scarabaeidae.
