= Euphoria biguttata =

Scientific classification
- Domain: Eukaryota
- Kingdom: Animalia
- Phylum: Arthropoda
- Class: Insecta
- Order: Coleoptera
- Suborder: Polyphaga
- Infraorder: Scarabaeiformia
- Family: Scarabaeidae
- Genus: Euphoria
- Species: E. biguttata

Binomial name
- Euphoria biguttata (Gory & Percheron, 1833)

Synonyms
- Euphoria binoculata Casey, 1915; Euphoria biplagiata Casey, 1915

Species of beetle

Euphoria biguttata is a species of scarab beetle in the family Scarabaeidae.
