= Euphoria canescens =

Scientific classification
- Domain: Eukaryota
- Kingdom: Animalia
- Phylum: Arthropoda
- Class: Insecta
- Order: Coleoptera
- Suborder: Polyphaga
- Infraorder: Scarabaeiformia
- Family: Scarabaeidae
- Genus: Euphoria
- Species: E. canescens

Binomial name
- Euphoria canescens (Gory & Percheron, 1833)

Synonyms
- Euphoria solidula Casey, 1915

Species of beetle

Euphoria canescens is a species of scarab beetle in the family Scarabaeidae.
