= Euphoria hirtipes =

Scientific classification
- Domain: Eukaryota
- Kingdom: Animalia
- Phylum: Arthropoda
- Class: Insecta
- Order: Coleoptera
- Suborder: Polyphaga
- Infraorder: Scarabaeiformia
- Family: Scarabaeidae
- Genus: Euphoria
- Species: E. hirtipes

Binomial name
- Euphoria hirtipes Horn, 1880

Species of beetle

Euphoria hirtipes is a species of scarab beetle in the family Scarabaeidae.
