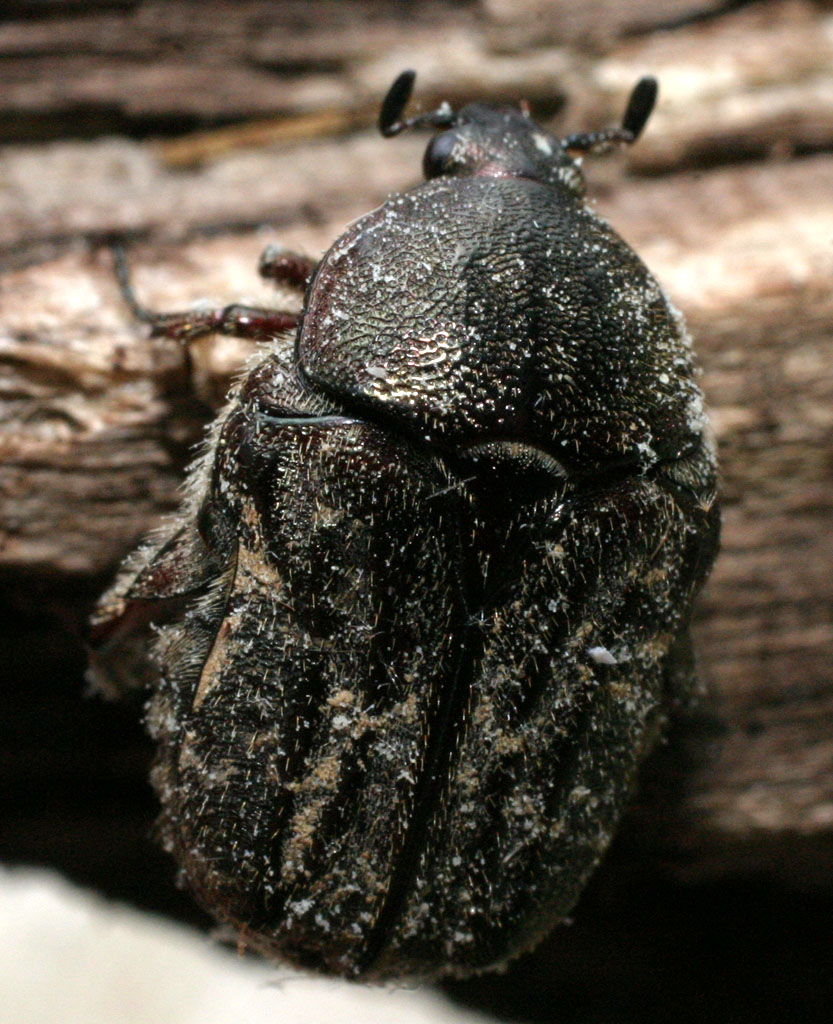

Scientific classification
- Kingdom: Animalia
- Phylum: Arthropoda
- Class: Insecta
- Order: Coleoptera
- Suborder: Polyphaga
- Infraorder: Scarabaeiformia
- Family: Scarabaeidae
- Genus: Euphoria
- Species: E. sepulcralis

Binomial name
- Euphoria sepulcralis (Fabricius, 1801)

Synonyms
- Cetonia sepulcralis Fabricius, 1801; Euphoria rufina (Gory and Percheron); Euphoria leucographa (Gory and Percheron); Euphoria nitens Casey, 1915

= Euphoria sepulcralis =

Species of beetle

Euphoria sepulcralis, the dark flower scarab, is a species of scarab beetle in the subfamily Cetoniinae. It is 9–11 millimetres (0.35–0.43 in) long and is brown in color. It is found in North America in countries such as Mexico and southern and Central United States.
