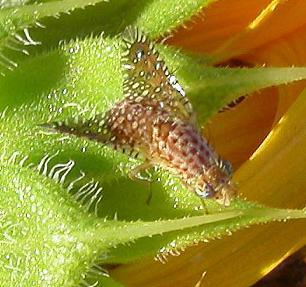
- Paracantha cultaris

Scientific classification
- Domain: Eukaryota
- Kingdom: Animalia
- Phylum: Arthropoda
- Class: Insecta
- Order: Diptera
- Family: Tephritidae
- Subfamily: Tephritinae
- Tribe: Eutretini
- Genus: Paracantha; Coquillett, 1899

Type species
- Trypeta culta Wiedemann, 1830

Synonyms
- Neorhabdochaeta Malloch, 1941; Carpotricha Loew, 1873; Scriptotricha Cockerell, 1889; Carphotriche Coquillett, 1899; Carptotricha Woodworth, 1913; Carphotrichia Woodworth, 1913; Laksyetsa Foote, 1978

= Paracantha =

Genus of flies

Paracantha is a genus of fruit flies in the family Tephritidae.

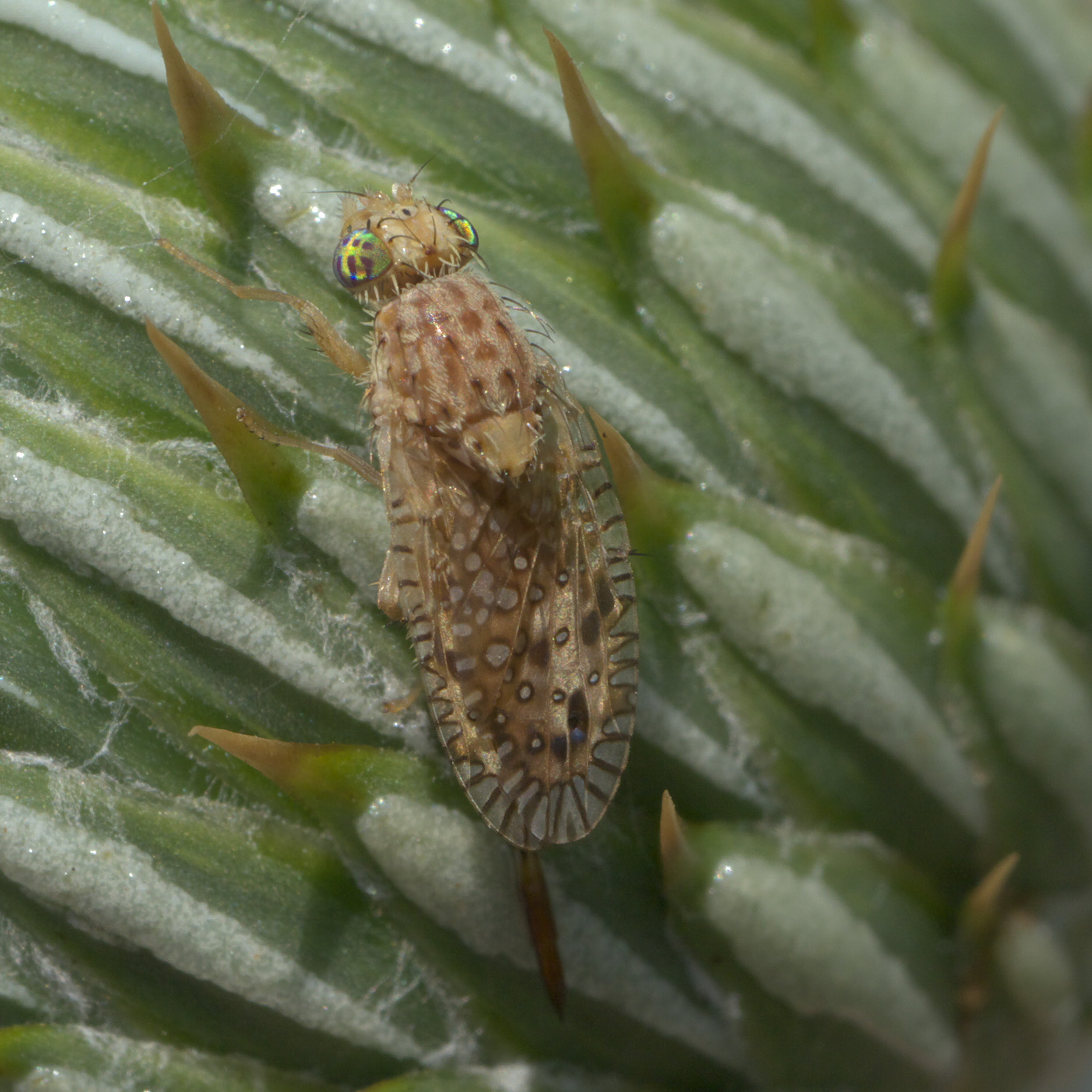

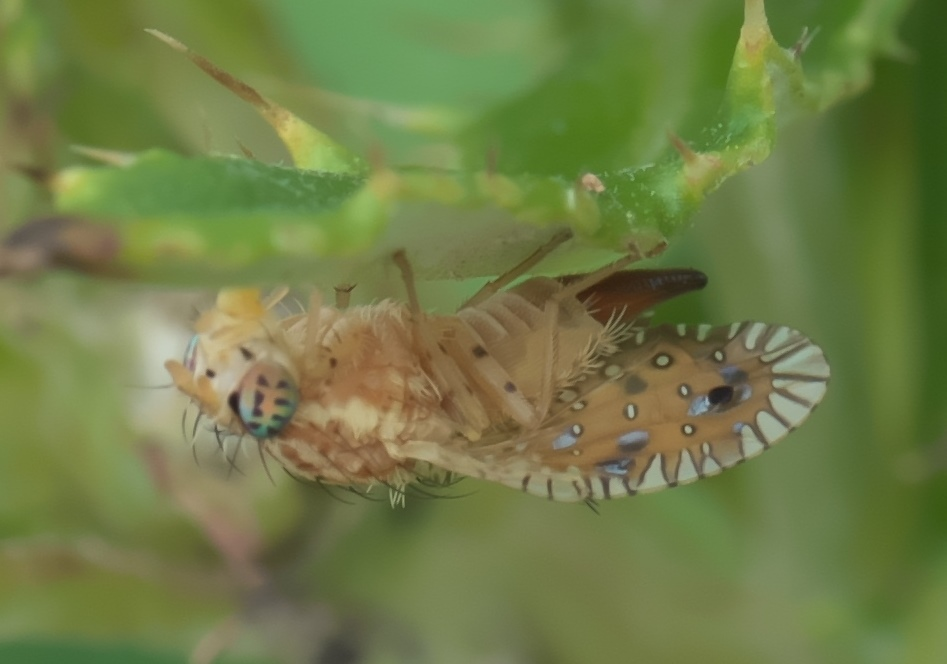

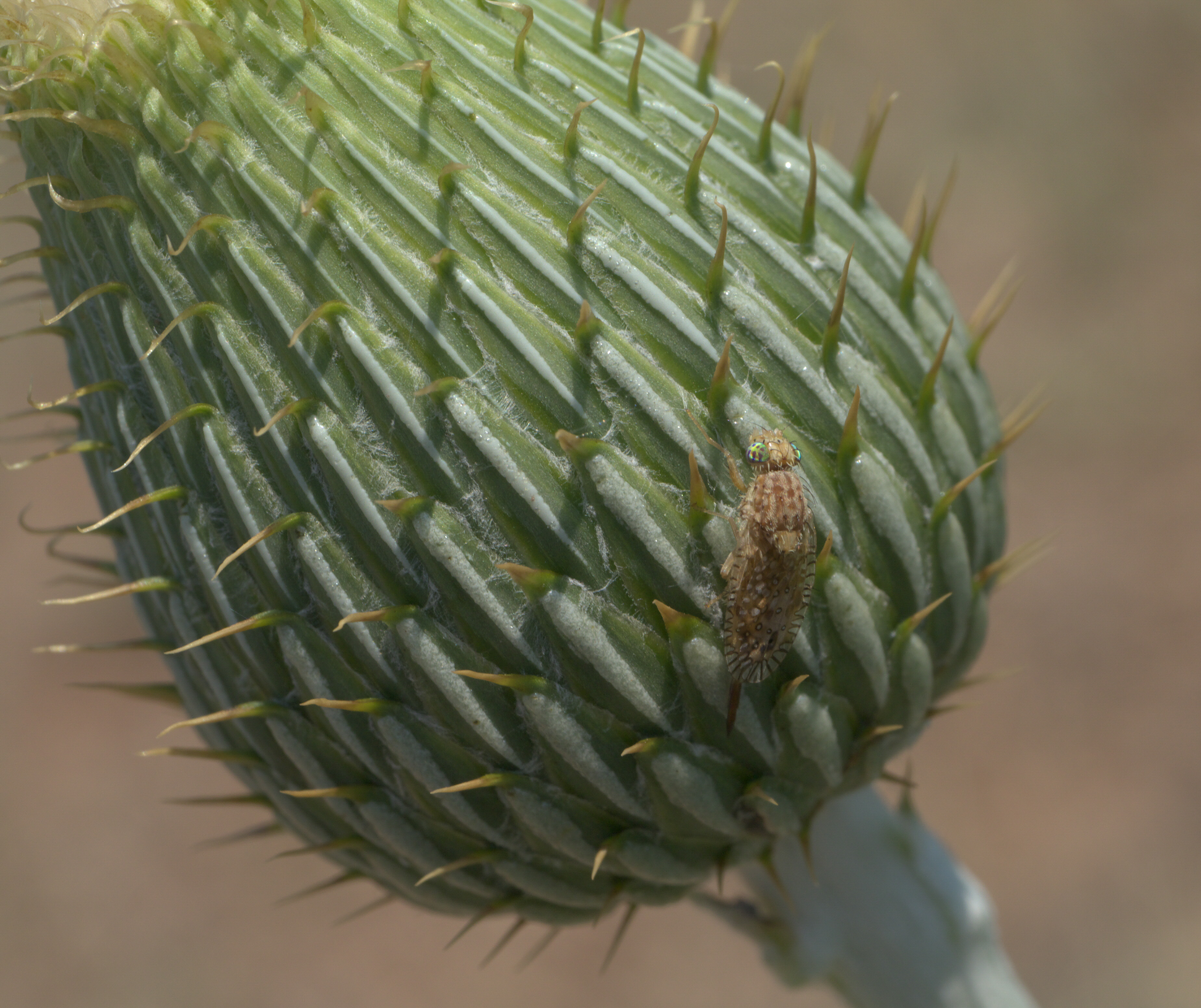

== Species ==
- Paracantha australis Malloch, 1933
- Paracantha culta (Wiedemann, 1830)
- Paracantha cultaris (Coquillett, 1894)
- Paracantha dentata Aczél, 1952
- Paracantha forficula Benjamin, 1934
- Paracantha genalis Malloch, 1941
- Paracantha gentilis Hering, 1940
- Paracantha haywardi Aczél, 1952
- Paracantha multipuncta Malloch, 1941
- Paracantha ruficallosa Hering, 1937
- Paracantha trinotata (Foote, 1978)
