= Euphoria fascifera =

Scientific classification
- Domain: Eukaryota
- Kingdom: Animalia
- Phylum: Arthropoda
- Class: Insecta
- Order: Coleoptera
- Suborder: Polyphaga
- Infraorder: Scarabaeiformia
- Family: Scarabaeidae
- Genus: Euphoria
- Species: E. fascifera

Binomial name
- Euphoria fascifera (LeConte, 1861)

Species of beetle

Euphoria fascifera is a species of scarab beetle in the family Scarabaeidae.

== Subspecies ==
These two subspecies belong to the species Euphoria fascifera:

- Euphoria fascifera fascifera (LeConte, 1861)
- Euphoria fascifera trapezium Casey, 1915
