= Euphoria histrionica =

Scientific classification
- Domain: Eukaryota
- Kingdom: Animalia
- Phylum: Arthropoda
- Class: Insecta
- Order: Coleoptera
- Suborder: Polyphaga
- Infraorder: Scarabaeiformia
- Family: Scarabaeidae
- Genus: Euphoria
- Species: E. histrionica

Binomial name
- Euphoria histrionica Thomson, 1878

Synonyms
- Euphoria scabiosa Casey, 1915; Euphoria sonorae Bates, 1889

Species of beetle

Euphoria histrionica is a species of scarab beetle in the family Scarabaeidae.
