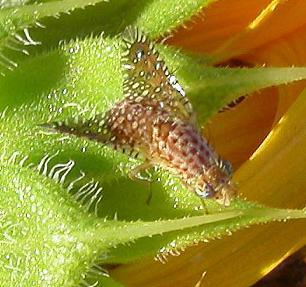

Scientific classification
- Kingdom: Animalia
- Phylum: Arthropoda
- Class: Insecta
- Order: Diptera
- Family: Tephritidae
- Genus: Paracantha
- Species: P. cultaris

Binomial name
- Paracantha cultaris (Coquillett, 1894)

Synonyms
- Trypeta cultaris Coquillett, 1894; Paracantha culturis Malloch, 1933

= Paracantha cultaris =

Species of fly

Paracantha cultaris is a species of tephritid fruit fly found in western North America, as far south as Costa Rica. The adult is mainly orange-brown in color. The maggots can be found inside sunflowers and the adult flies are usually nearby the sunflowers.
