= Euphoria anneae =

Scientific classification
- Kingdom: Animalia
- Phylum: Arthropoda
- Clade: Pancrustacea
- Class: Insecta
- Order: Coleoptera
- Suborder: Polyphaga
- Infraorder: Scarabaeiformia
- Family: Scarabaeidae
- Genus: Euphoria
- Species: E. anneae

Binomial name
- Euphoria anneae (Howden, 1955)

Species of beetle

Euphoria anneae, or Anne's euphoria scarab, is a species of scarab beetle in the family Scarabaeidae.
