= Paracantha trinotata =

Scientific classification
- Kingdom: Animalia
- Phylum: Arthropoda
- Class: Insecta
- Order: Diptera
- Family: Tephritidae
- Subfamily: Tephritinae
- Tribe: Eutretini
- Genus: Paracantha
- Species: P. trinotata

Binomial name
- Paracantha trinotata (Foote, 1978)

Synonyms
- Laksyetsa trinotata Foote, 1978

Species of fly

Paracantha trinotata is a species of tephritid or fruit flies in the genus Paracantha of the family Tephritidae.

== Distribution ==
Mexico, Guatemala.
