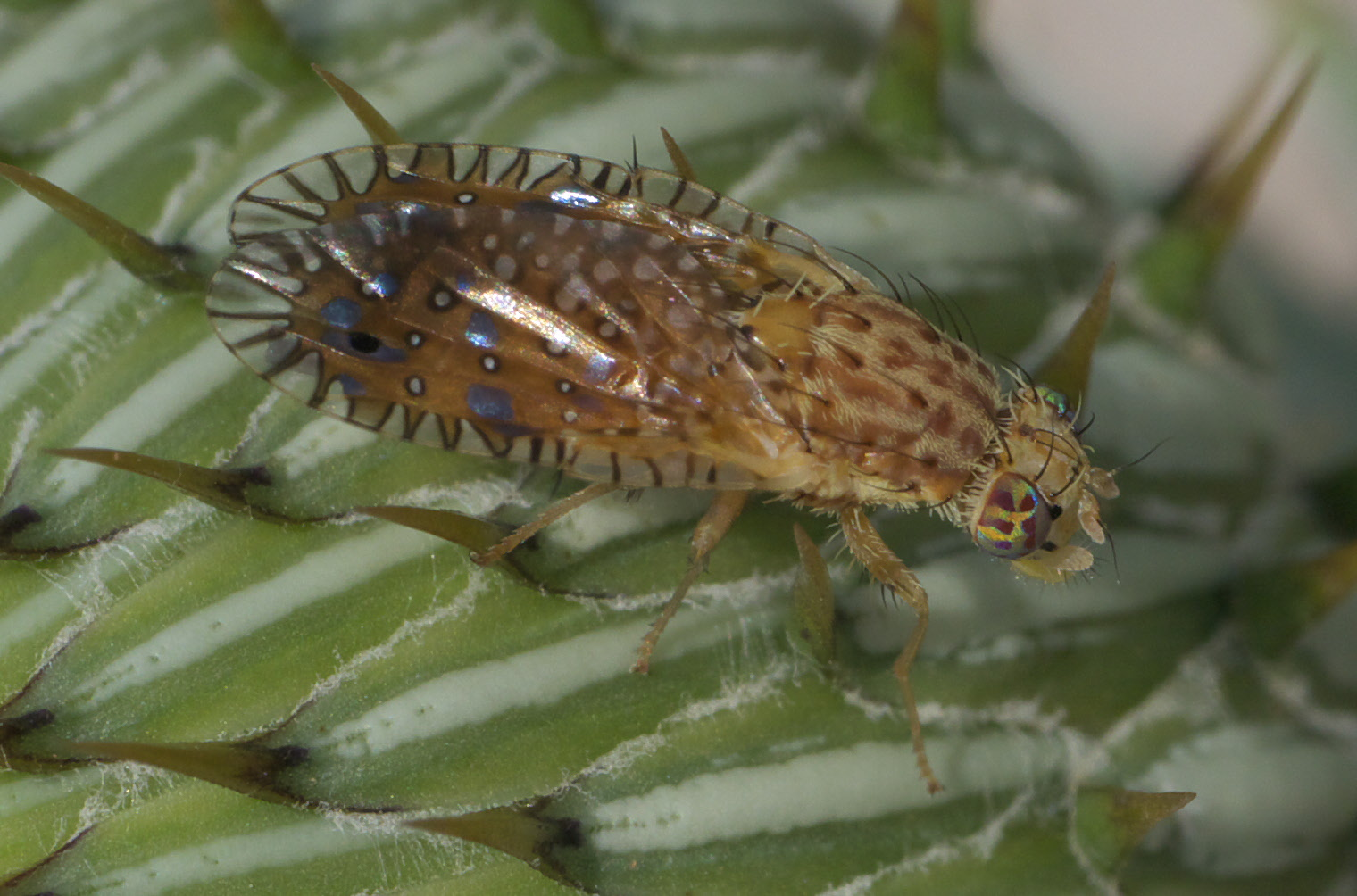

Scientific classification
- Kingdom: Animalia
- Phylum: Arthropoda
- Class: Insecta
- Order: Diptera
- Family: Tephritidae
- Tribe: Eutretini
- Genus: Paracantha
- Species: P. culta

Binomial name
- Paracantha culta Wiedemann, 1830

Synonyms
- Acinia fimbriata Macquart, 1843; Acinia fimbrata Malloch, 1941; Trypeta culta Wiedemann, 1830; Trypeta sarnia Walker, 1849

= Paracantha culta =

Species of fly

Paracantha culta is a species of fruit fly in the family Tephritidae.

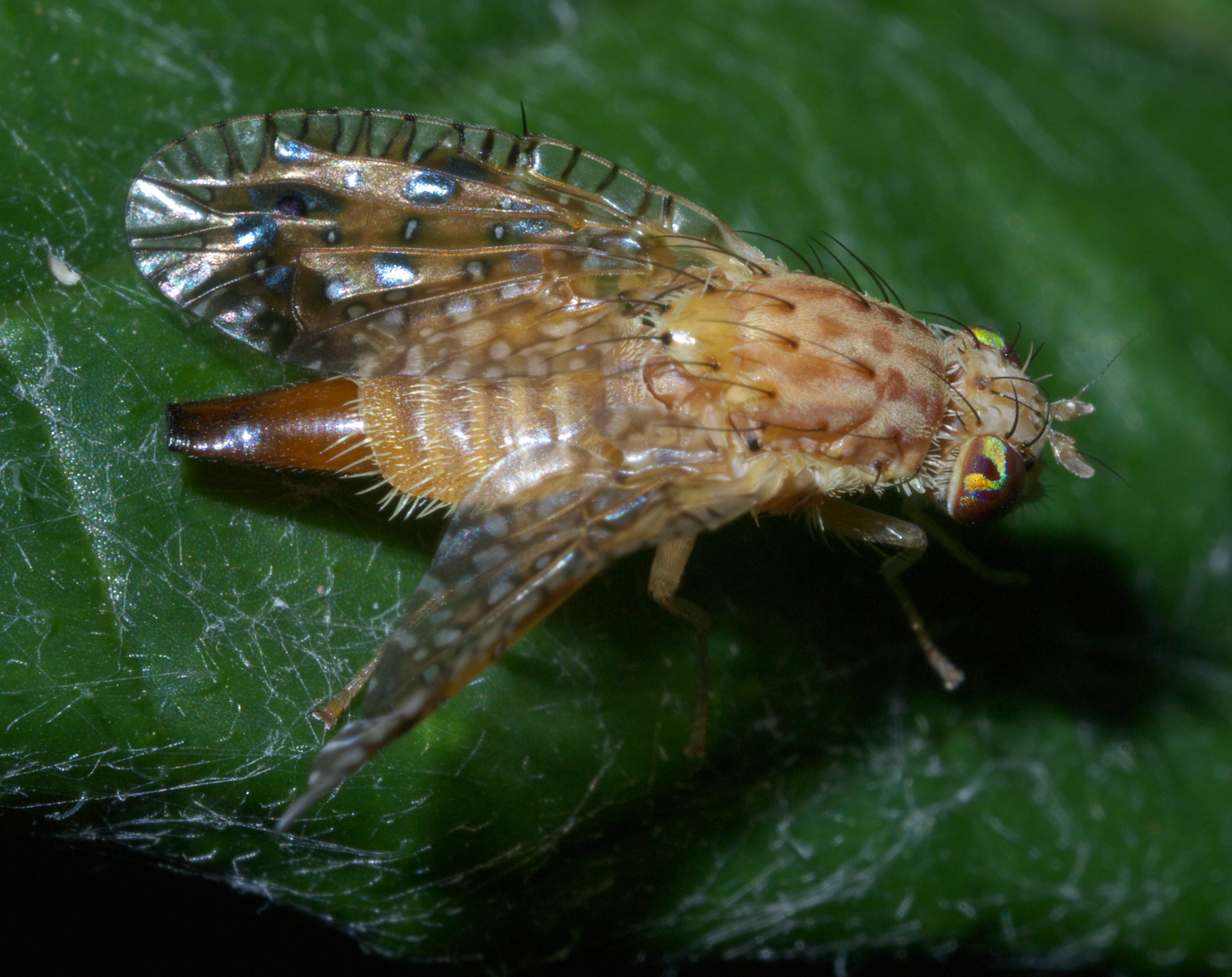

== Distribution ==
Canada, United States.
