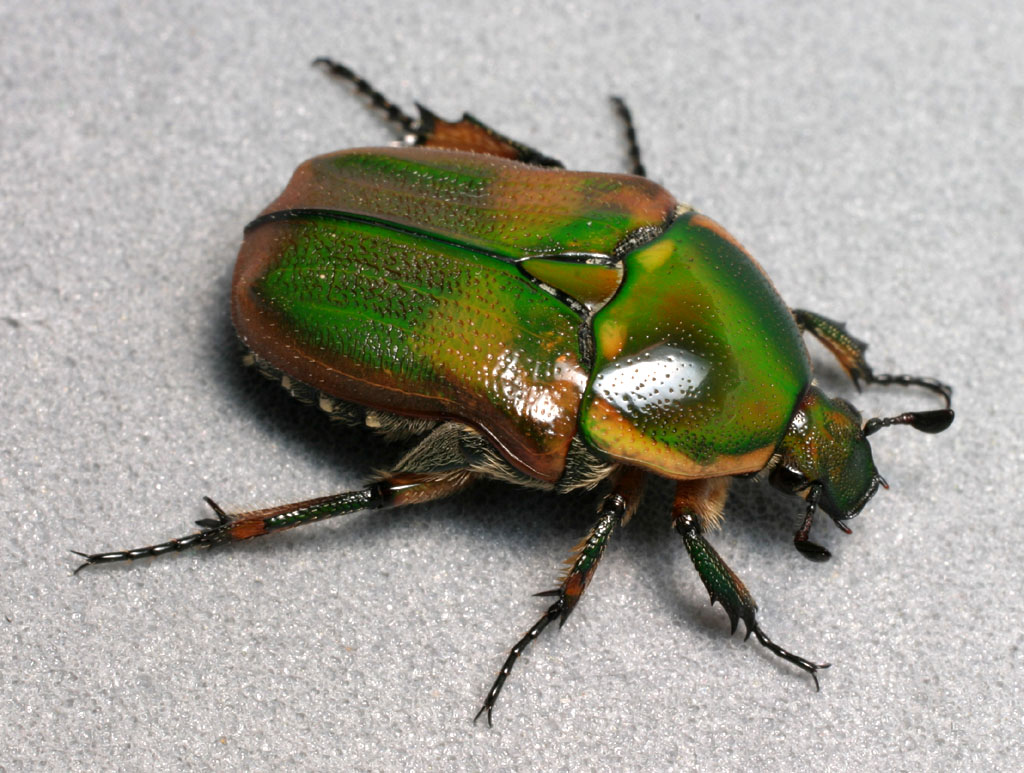

Scientific classification
- Domain: Eukaryota
- Kingdom: Animalia
- Phylum: Arthropoda
- Class: Insecta
- Order: Coleoptera
- Suborder: Polyphaga
- Infraorder: Scarabaeiformia
- Family: Scarabaeidae
- Genus: Euphoria
- Species: E. fulgida

Binomial name
- Euphoria fulgida (Fabricius, 1775)

= Euphoria fulgida =

Species of beetle

Euphoria fulgida, the emerald euphoria, is a species of flower chafer in the family Scarabaeidae. It is found in North America.

== Subspecies ==
These four subspecies belong to the species Euphoria fulgida:

- Euphoria fulgida fulgida (Fabricius, 1775)
- Euphoria fulgida fuscocyanea Casey, 1915
- Euphoria fulgida holochloris Fall, 1905
- Euphoria fulgida limbalis Fall, 1905
