= Martin Ladislau Aczél =

Hungarian botanist

Márton Aczél
- Born: June 8, 1906; Budapest, Hungary
- Died: April 28, 1958; San Miguel de Tucumán, Argentina
- Education: Pázmány Péter Catholic University (now Eötvös Loránd University)
- Known for: Studies on Diptera (flies)
- Scientific career
- Fields: Botany, Entomology
- Institutions: Eötvös Loránd University; National University of Tucumán
- Author abbrev. (botany): Aczél

Márton Aczél (in Hungarian name order: Aczél Márton; in the Americas often known as Martin Ladislau Aczél; 8 June 1906 — 28 April 1958) was a Hungarian-born botanist, later an entomologist and university teacher. His standard botanical author abbreviation is Aczél.

== Biography ==
Aczél was adopted in 1912, and his original birth name is unknown. He graduated from secondary school in his native city of Budapest in 1924. He earned degrees in pedagogy (1929) and philosophy (1932) from the Pázmány Péter University of Sciences (today Eötvös Loránd University). After receiving his first degree, he worked as a university assistant. Between 1933 and 1940, he served as an assistant, and from 1941 to 1944 as a lecturer at a research institute. His habilitation took place in 1943. During the academic year 1943, he was also a docent (associate professor) at the university and conducted research in Nazi Germany.

In 1944, Aczél emigrated to Argentina. From 1948 to 1953, he worked as a researcher at a scientific institute, later joining the National University of Tucumán, where he taught until his death in 1958.

He married in 1931; his wife gave birth to two children, in 1935 and 1942. Aczél received several scientific awards between 1948 and 1958.

== Selected works ==
- A Cercidothrix és Calycocystis subgenusokba tartozó hazai Astragalus fajok anatómiája (Dissertation, 1933)
- Védekezés a levéltetvek ellen (Control of Aphids) (1939, 1941, 1943)
- Védekezés a földi bolhák ellen (Control of Fleas) (1942)
- Grundlagen einer Monographie der Dorilaiden. Diptera. Dorilaiden-Studien 6. (1948)
- Morfologia externa y división sistemática de las Tanypezidiformes, con sinópsis de las especies argentinas de Tylidae y Neriidae (1953–1954)
