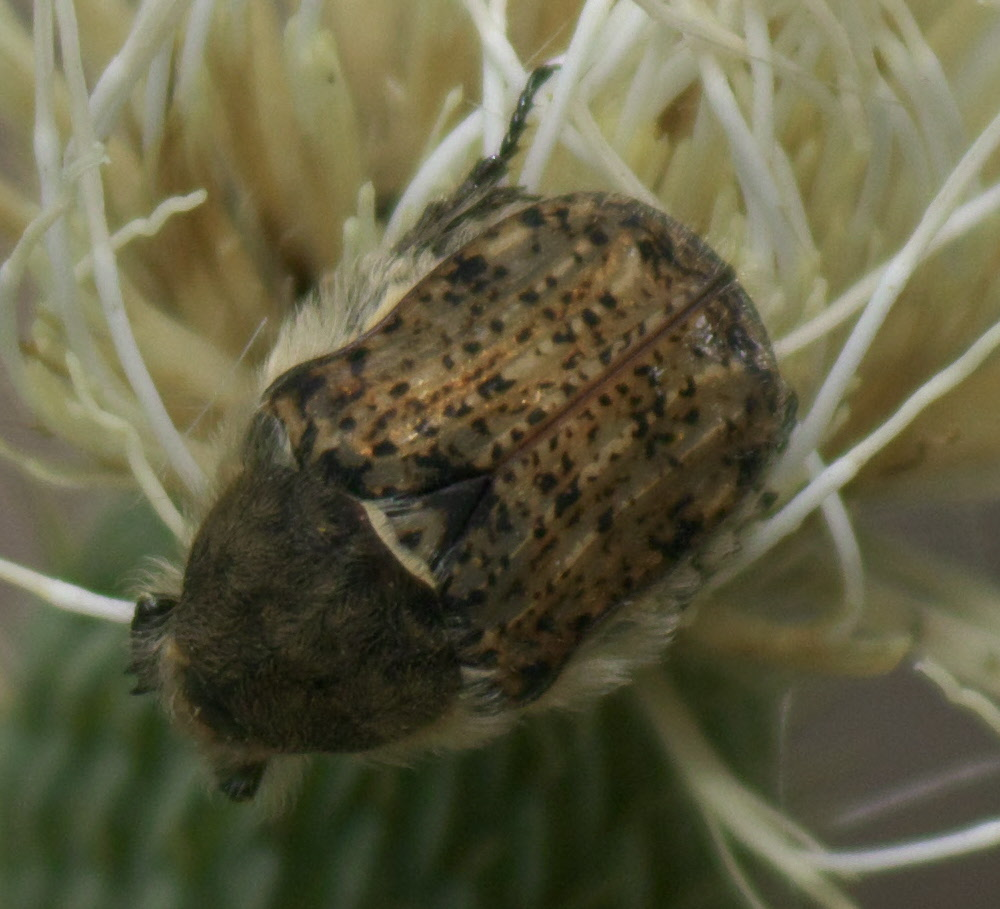

Scientific classification
- Kingdom: Animalia
- Phylum: Arthropoda
- Clade: Pancrustacea
- Class: Insecta
- Order: Coleoptera
- Suborder: Polyphaga
- Infraorder: Scarabaeiformia
- Family: Scarabaeidae
- Genus: Euphoria
- Species: E. inda

Binomial name
- Euphoria inda (Linnaeus, 1758)

Synonyms
- Cetonia barbata Say, 1824; Cetonia brunnea Gory and Percheron, 1833; Cetonia marilandica Frölich, 1792; Euphoria nigripennis Klages, 1894; Euphoria rufobrunnea Casey, 1915; Goraqua smithsana Péringuey, 1907

= Euphoria inda =

Species of beetle

Euphoria inda, the bumble flower beetle, brown fruit chafer or Indian cetonia, is a species of beetle in the family Scarabaeidae. It is found in North America. While in flight, adults of this species do not lift their elytra, creating a buzzing sound as the hindwings vibrate inside. The adult beetle is a pollinator and feeds on pollen, nectar, sap and damaged fruits.
