= Lobmingtal =

- Municipality
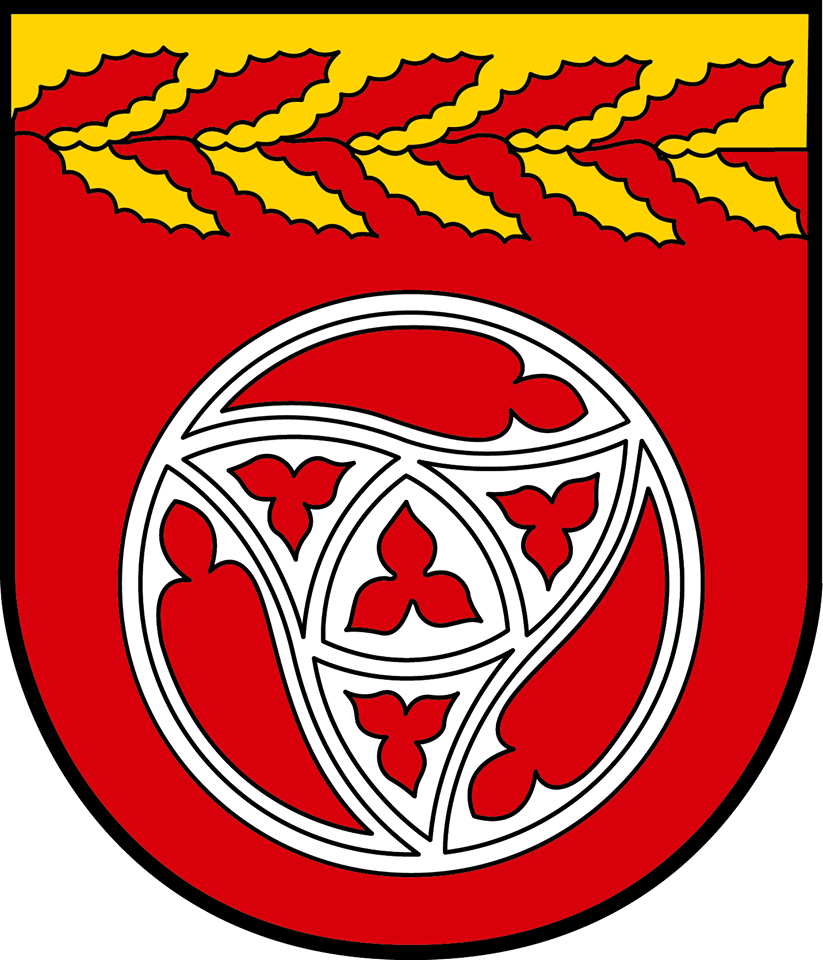
- Coat of arms

- Location within Austria
- Coordinates: 47°10′00″N 14°48′00″E
- Country: Austria
- State: Styria
- District: Murtal, judicial district Judenburg

Government
  - Mayor: Heribert Bogensperger (ÖVP)

Area
  - Total: 54.54 km^{2} (21.06 sq mi)
- Elevation: 614 m (2,014 ft)

Population (2018-01-01)
  - Total: 1,852
  - Density: 33.96/km^{2} (87.95/sq mi)
- Time zone: UTC+1 (CET)
  - Summer (DST): UTC+2 (CEST)
- Postal code: 8734, 8592, 8741
- Area code: +43 3512
- Vehicle registration: MT
- Website: www.lobmingtal.at

Lobmingtal is a municipality with 1,825 residents (as of 1 January 2016) in the Murtal District and Judenburg judicial district of Styria, Austria. The municipality has an area of 54.38 km^{2} (21.00 sq mi).

As part of the Styria municipal structural reform, in 2015, the towns of Großlobming and Kleinlobming were merged, and initially called "Großlobming". After a council decision, the municipality since 2016 has held the name "Lobmingtal".

== Geography ==
The main section, Großlobming lies at a height of 641 metres (2,103 ft) about 3 kilometres (1.9 mi) south of the town center of Knittelfeld am Murboden, at the entrance of Lobmingbachtal valley. The municipality territory borders the north of the Mur River.

=== Municipality arrangement ===
The municipality territory includes the following three sections and like-named Katastralgemeinden (populations and areas 1 Jan 2015):

- Großlobming (1,192; 736,67 ha)
- Kleinlobming (370; 3.543,15 ha)
- Mitterlobming (241; 1,158.70 ha)

=== Merger ===
In the Styria municipal structural reform, the town Großlobming in 2015 merged with the town Kleinlobming.

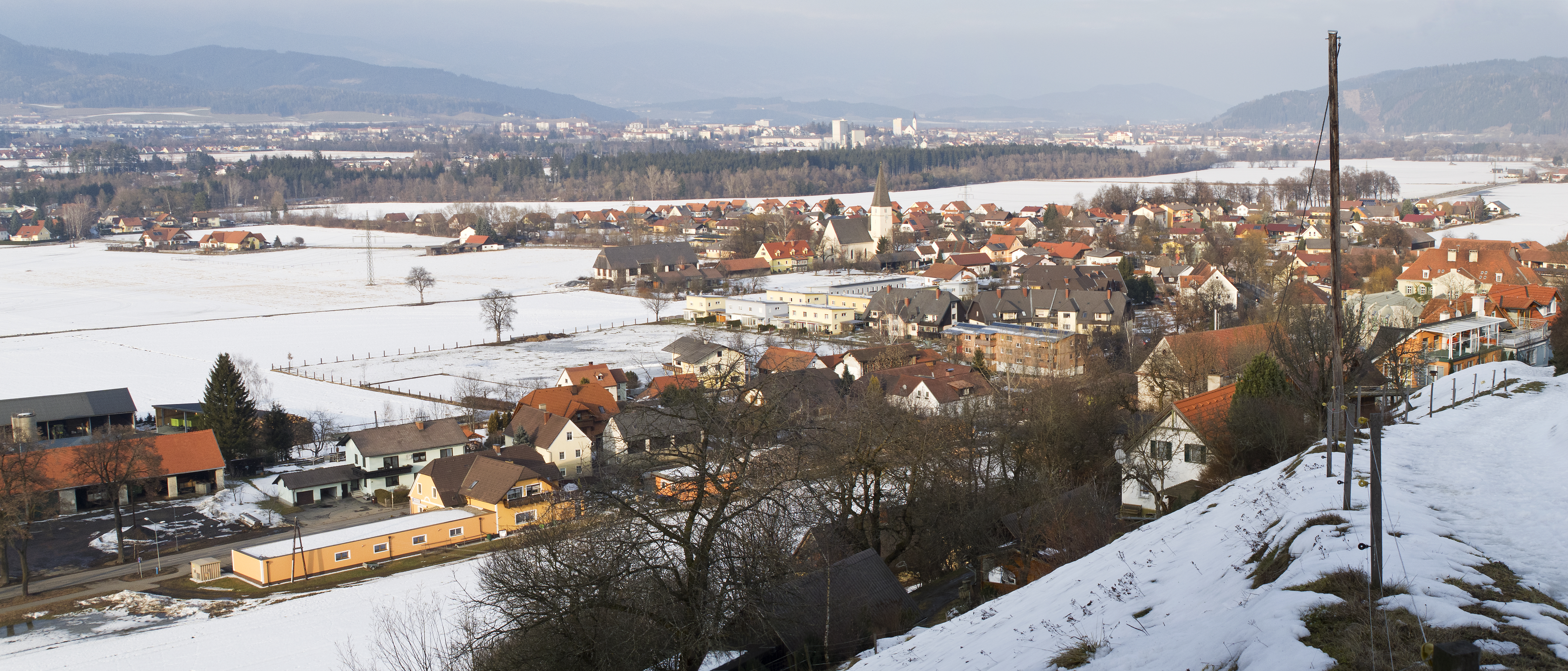
View of Großlobming from southwest.

=== Tourism ===
The municipality formed, together with Gaal, Kobenz, Seckau, Spielberg, St. Marein-Feistritz and Zeltweg, the tourism agency "Tourismus am Spielberg". The base is in the town Spielberg.

== History ==
In 927 the first mention of the territory of Lobming was in a document of the Archbishop of Salzburg. Since the middle of the twelfth century, the members of the clan always called themselves one of the defensive buildings belonging to them, but mostly after their tribe seat. The first knight who called themselves "of Lobming" were, in May 1149 to Friesach called. The Knights of Lobming were located in the castle of Altlobming (today Sulzbachgraben). Numerous legends and tales are ruling around the Knights of Lobming, which had a dominant position in the first half of the fifteenth century.

After the extinction of the knights of Lobming, King Friedrich II handed over the rule of Großlobming to Wolfgang Zach. Afterwards the Knights of Praunfalk owned the castle Großlobming for a time. The second defensive structure remained with the Welzern and was sold in 1499 to the cousins Hans and Erasmus of Saurau. On 14 September 1730 the area Großlobming was sold to Siegmund Count Welfersheim. The next resale was on April 23, 1755 to Spital am Pyhrn, which sold the rule immediately to Count Franz Josef Wurmbrand.

In 1827, Josef Sessler bought the Großlobming estate from Wurmbrand's bankruptcy. On September 1, 1866 replaced Viktor Sessler the nobility and knighthood. By his marriage to Helen Freiin von Herzinger, the barony went over to him, and Viktor wrote from then on Sessler-Herzinger. Through the childless marriage of Viktor Felix and Margarete Sessler-Herzinger her nephews Dr. phil. Adalbert Maria Franz Curt August, patron of Wimpffen and Oberleutnant a. D. and Hans Maria Carl Alfons Gustav, patron of Wimpffen Gut and Schloss Großlobming.

The castle, owned by the Wimpffen family, was sold to the Styrian Provincial Government in 1979 for the purpose of establishing an agricultural college. Parallel to the events of the family Sessler-Herzinger 1898 the estate Murhof, which up to then was in peasant hands, was converted into a domicile seat. The Gestüt Murhof under Baron Gustav Hanstein became famous. A series of national and international trophies testify to the highly successful English thoroughbred. Due to the demise of Gustav Hanstein, the breeding at the Murhof was unfortunately put an end.

In 2014, Red Bull owner Mateschitz negotiated with the municipality, as he wanted to buy the castle and convert it into a luxury polo square with hotel.

Also see: Kleinlobming#History

== Population ==
Lobmingtal is a residential community. This means that most residents commute to the surrounding towns, such as Knittelfeld, Zeltweg or Judenburg.

== Economy and Infrastructure ==
The traffic is reached via the provincial roads Lobmingerstraße L 504 und Möbersdorferstraße L 543.
