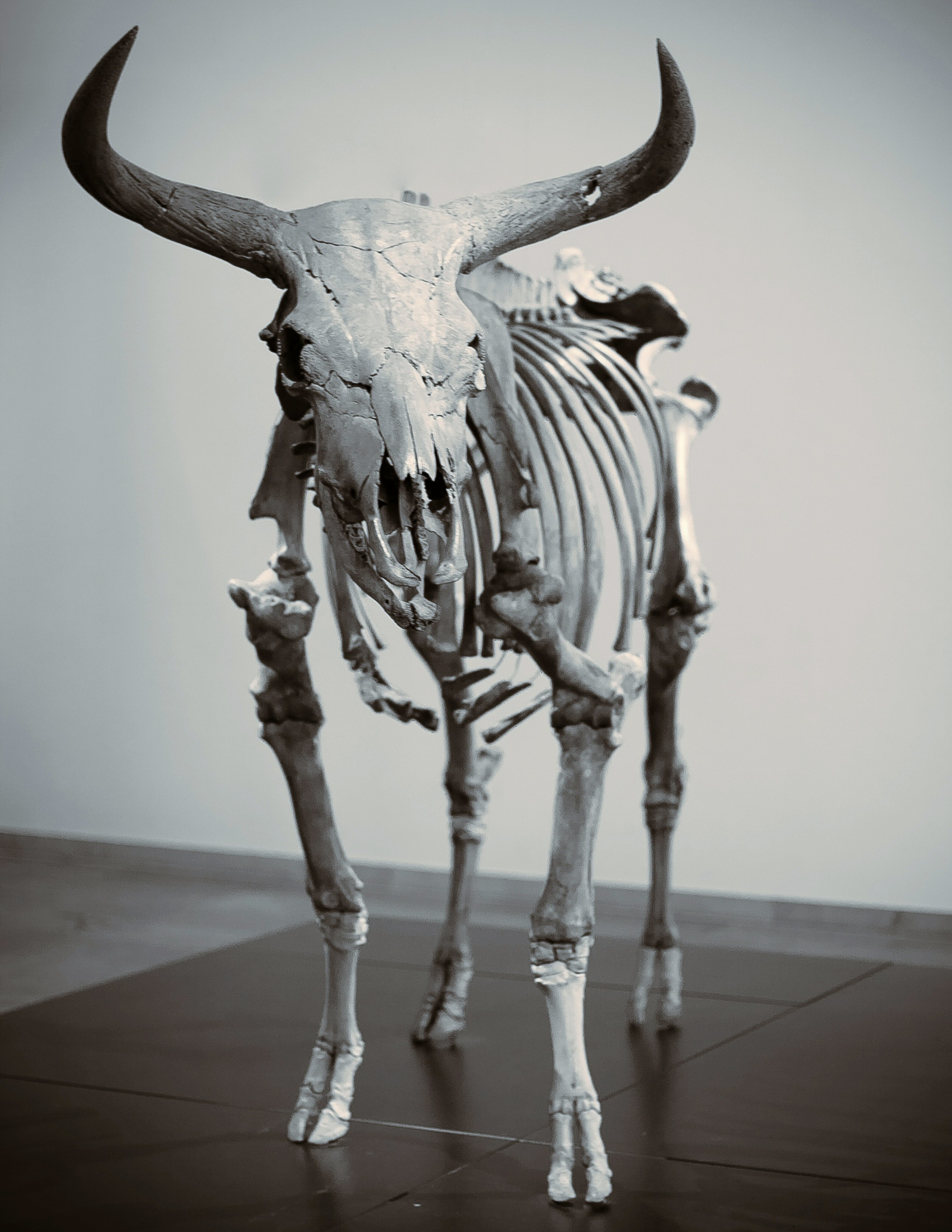
- Mounted skeleton of an aurochs bull at the National Museum of Denmark

Conservation status
- Extinct (1627) (IUCN 3.1)

Scientific classification
- Kingdom: Animalia
- Phylum: Chordata
- Class: Mammalia
- Order: Artiodactyla
- Family: Bovidae
- Subfamily: Bovinae
- Genus: Bos
- Species: †B. primigenius

Binomial name
- †Bos primigenius Bojanus, 1825

Subspecies
- See text
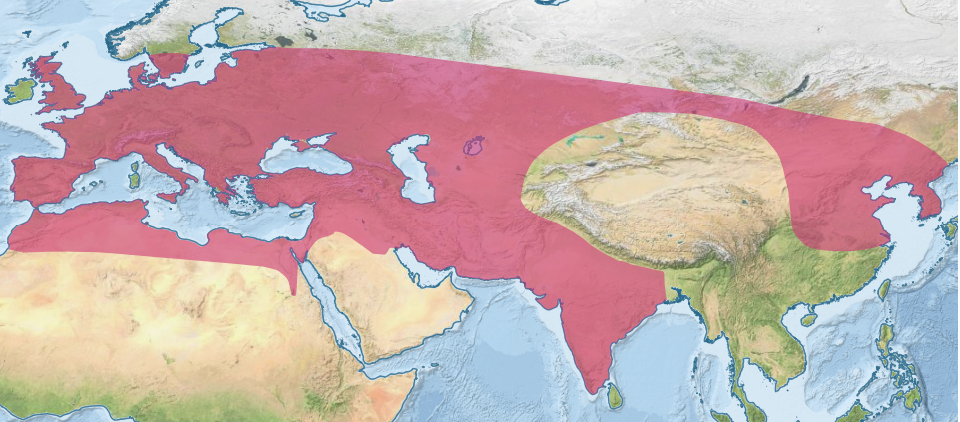
- Former distribution of the aurochs

= Aurochs =

Aurochs Temporal range: Middle Pleistocene–Holocene

Extinct species of large cattle

The aurochs (Bos primigenius; /ˈɔːrɒks/ or /ˈaʊrɒks/; pl.: aurochs or aurochsen; also ure or urus) is an extinct species of bovine, considered to be the wild ancestor of modern domestic cattle (Bos taurus). With a shoulder height of up to 1.8 m (5 ft 11 in) in bulls and 1.55 m (5 ft 1 in) in cows, it was one of the largest herbivores in the Holocene; it had massive elongated and broad horns that reached 80 cm (31 in) in length.

The aurochs was part of the Pleistocene megafauna and had an expansive range spanning from western Europe and northern Africa to the Indian subcontinent and East Asia. It probably evolved in Asia and migrated west and north during warm interglacial periods. The oldest-known aurochs fossils date to the Middle Pleistocene. Its distribution progressively contracted during the Holocene due to habitat loss and hunting. The last confirmed and widely accepted individual died in Jaktorów forest in Poland in 1627, though some reports suggest it may have survived up to a century later in parts of southeastern Europe.

There is a long history of interaction between aurochs and humans, including archaic hominins like Neanderthals. The aurochs is depicted in Paleolithic cave paintings, Neolithic petroglyphs, Ancient Egyptian reliefs and Bronze Age figurines. It symbolised power, sexual potency and prowess in religions of the ancient Near East. Its horns were used in votive offerings, as trophies and drinking horns.

Two aurochs domestication events occurred during the Neolithic Revolution. One gave rise to the domestic taurine cattle in the Fertile Crescent that was introduced to Europe via the Balkans and the coast of the Mediterranean Sea. Hybridisation between aurochs and early domestic cattle occurred during the early Holocene. Domestication of the Indian aurochs led to the zebu cattle (Bos indicus) that hybridised with early taurine cattle in the Near East about 4,000 years ago. Some modern cattle breeds exhibit features reminiscent of the aurochs, such as the dark colour and light eel stripe along the back of bulls, the lighter colour of cows, or an aurochs-like horn shape.

== Etymology ==
Both "aur" and "ur" are Germanic or Celtic words meaning "wild ox". In Old High German, this word was compounded with ohso ('ox') to ūrohso, which became the early modern Aurochs. The Latin word "urus" was used for wild ox from the Gallic Wars onwards.

The use of the plural form aurochsen in English is a direct parallel of the German plural Ochsen and recreates the same distinction by analogy as English singular ox and plural oxen, although aurochs may stand for both the singular and the plural term; both are attested.

== Taxonomy and evolution ==
The scientific name Bos taurus was introduced by Carl Linnaeus in 1758 for feral cattle in Poland. The scientific name Bos primigenius was proposed for the aurochs by Ludwig Heinrich Bojanus who described the skeletal differences between the aurochs and domestic cattle in 1825, published in 1827. The name Bos namadicus was used by Hugh Falconer in 1859 for cattle fossils found in Nerbudda deposits. Bos primigenius mauritanicus was coined by Philippe Thomas in 1881 who described fossils found in deposits near Oued Seguen west of Constantine, Algeria.

In 2003, the International Commission on Zoological Nomenclature placed Bos primigenius on the Official List of Specific Names in Zoology and thereby recognized the validity of this name for a wild species.

=== Subspecies ===
Three aurochs subspecies have traditionally been recognised to have existed in historical times:

- The Eurasian aurochs (B. p. primigenius) was part of the Pleistocene megafauna in Eurasia and survived until the 17th century in Eastern Europe.
- The Indian aurochs (B. p. namadicus) lived on the Indian subcontinent.
- The North African aurochs (B. p. mauritanicus) lived north of the Sahara. This subspecies has also been called B. p. opisthonomus.

Chinese geneticists published mitochondrial DNA evidence supporting that Eurasian aurochs populations from northern China were genetically isolated for large stretches of the Pleistocene, and as a result distinctive enough to be considered a separate subspecies, the East Asian aurochs (B. p. sinensis), even if this was not morphologically distinct.

At least two dwarf subspecies of aurochs developed on Mediterranean islands as a result of sea level changes during the Pleistocene:

- B. p. siciliae on the Italian island of Sicily.
- B. p. thrinacius on the Greek island of Kythira.

=== Evolution ===
Calibrations using fossils of 16 Bovidae species indicate that the Bovini tribe evolved about 11.7 million years ago. The Bos and Bison genetic lineages are estimated to have genetically diverged from the Bovini about 2.5 to 1.65 million years ago. The following cladogram shows the phylogenetic relationships of the aurochs based on analysis of nuclear and mitochondrial genomes in the Bovini tribe:

- Bovini
  - Bubalina (buffalo)
  - Bos
    - Bos primigenius (aurochs)
    - - - Bos mutus (wild yak)
        - - Bison bison (American bison)
          - Bison bonasus (European bison/wisent)
      - - Bos javanicus (banteng)
        - Bos gaurus (gaur)
        - Bos sauveli (kouprey)

The cold Pliocene climate caused an extension of open grassland, which enabled the evolution of large grazers. The origin of the aurochs is unclear, with authors suggesting either an African or Asian origin for the species. Bos acutifrons is considered to be a possible ancestor of the aurochs, of which a fossil skull was excavated in the Sivalik Hills in India that dates to the Early Pleistocene about 2 million years ago.

An aurochs skull excavated in Tunisia's Kef Governorate from early Middle Pleistocene strata dating about 0.78 million years ago is the oldest well-dated fossil specimen to date. The authors of the study proposed that Bos might have evolved in Africa and migrated to Eurasia during the Middle Pleistocene. Middle Pleistocene aurochs fossils were also excavated in a Saharan erg in the Hoggar Mountains.

Fossils of the Indian subspecies (Bos primigenius namadicus) were excavated in alluvial deposits in South India dating to the Middle Pleistocene. Remains of aurochs are common in Late Pleistocene sites across the Indian subcontinent.

The earliest fossils in Europe date to the Middle Pleistocene. One site widely historically suggested to represent the first appearance of aurochs in Europe was the Notarchirico site in southern Italy, dating around 600,000 years ago, however a 2024 re-examination of the site found that presence of aurochs at the locality was unsupported, with the oldest records of aurochs now placed at the Ponte Molle site in central Italy, dating to around 550–450,000 years ago. Aurochs were present in Britain by Marine Isotope Stage 11 ~400,000 years ago.

The earliest remains aurochs in East Asia are uncertain, but may date to the late Middle Pleistocene, probably no earlier than 200,000 years ago.

Late Pleistocene aurochs fossils were found in Affad 23 in Sudan dating to 50,000 years ago when the climate in this region was more humid than during the African humid period.

Following the most recent deglaciation, the range of the aurochs expanded into Denmark and southern Sweden at the beginning of the Holocene, around 12–11,000 years ago.

== Description ==
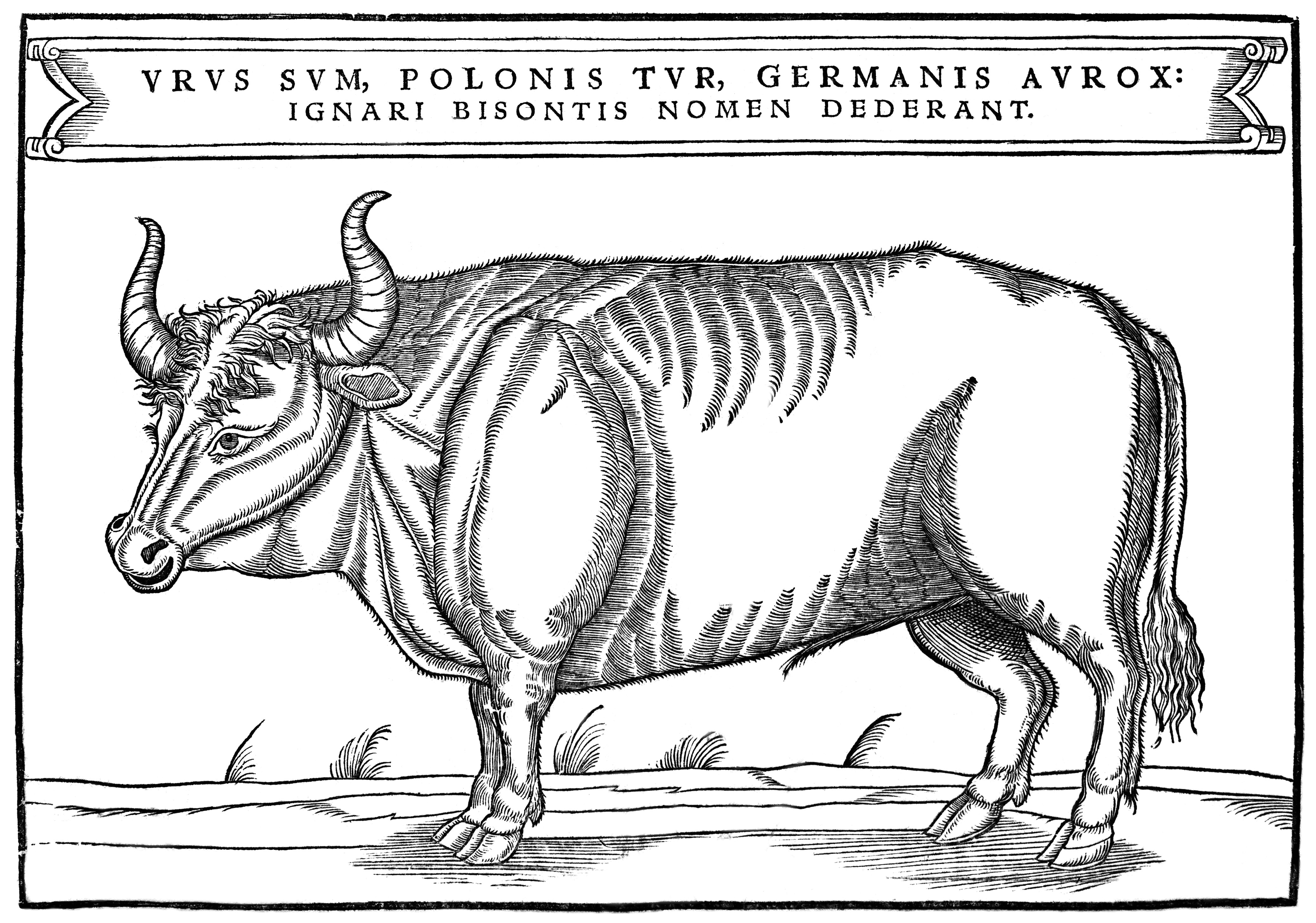
Illustration by Sigismund von Herberstein captioned: Urus sum, polonis Tur, germanis Aurox; ignari Bisontis nomen dederant; translated: "I am Urus, Tur in Polish, Aurox in German; the ignorant ones gave me the name Bison"

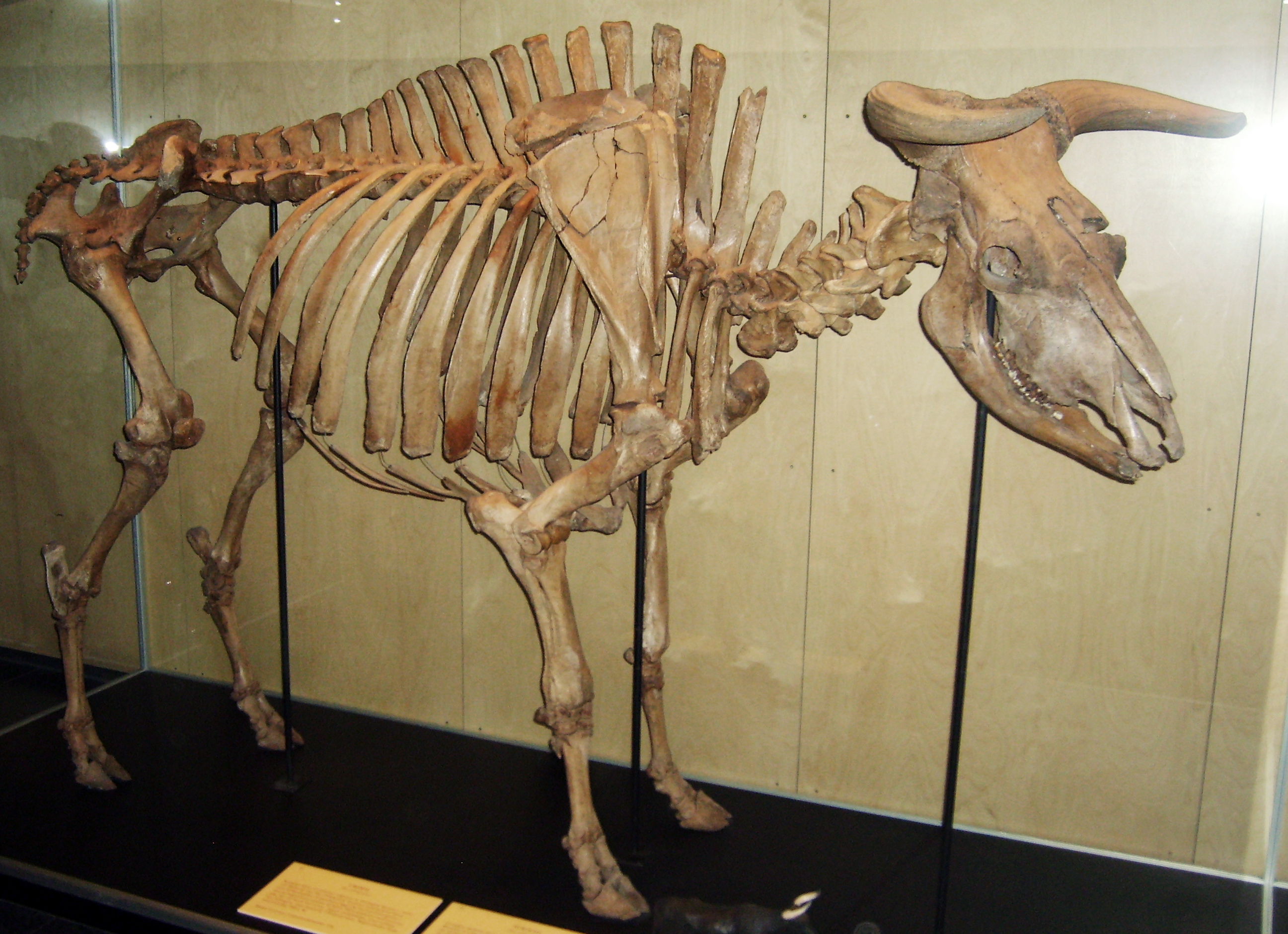
Aurochs skeleton from Zealand island in Denmark on display in the Natural History Museum of Denmark

According to a 16th-century description by Sigismund von Herberstein, the aurochs was pitch-black with a grey streak along the back; his wood carving made in 1556 was based on a culled aurochs, which he had received in Mazovia. In 1827, Charles Hamilton Smith published an image of an aurochs that was based on an oil painting that he had purchased from a merchant in Augsburg, which is thought to have been made in the early 16th century. This painting is thought to have shown an aurochs, although some authors suggested it may have shown a hybrid between an aurochs and domestic cattle, or a Polish steer. Contemporary reconstructions of the aurochs are based on skeletons and the information derived from contemporaneous artistic depictions and historic descriptions of the animal.

=== Coat colour ===
Remains of aurochs hair were not known until the early 1980s. Depictions show that the North African aurochs may have had a light saddle marking on its back. Calves were probably born with a chestnut colour, and young bulls changed to black with a white eel stripe running down the spine, while cows retained a reddish-brown colour. Both sexes had a light-coloured muzzle, but evidence for variation in coat colour does not exist. Egyptian grave paintings show cattle with a reddish-brown coat colour in both sexes, with a light saddle, but the horn shape of these suggest that they may depict domesticated cattle. Many primitive cattle breeds, particularly those from Southern Europe, display similar coat colours to the aurochs, including the black colour in bulls with a light eel stripe, a pale mouth, and similar sexual dimorphism in colour. A feature often attributed to the aurochs is blond forehead hairs. According to historical descriptions of the aurochs, it had long and curly forehead hair, but none mentions a certain colour. Although the colour is present in a variety of primitive cattle breeds, it is probably a discolouration that appeared after domestication.

=== Body shape ===
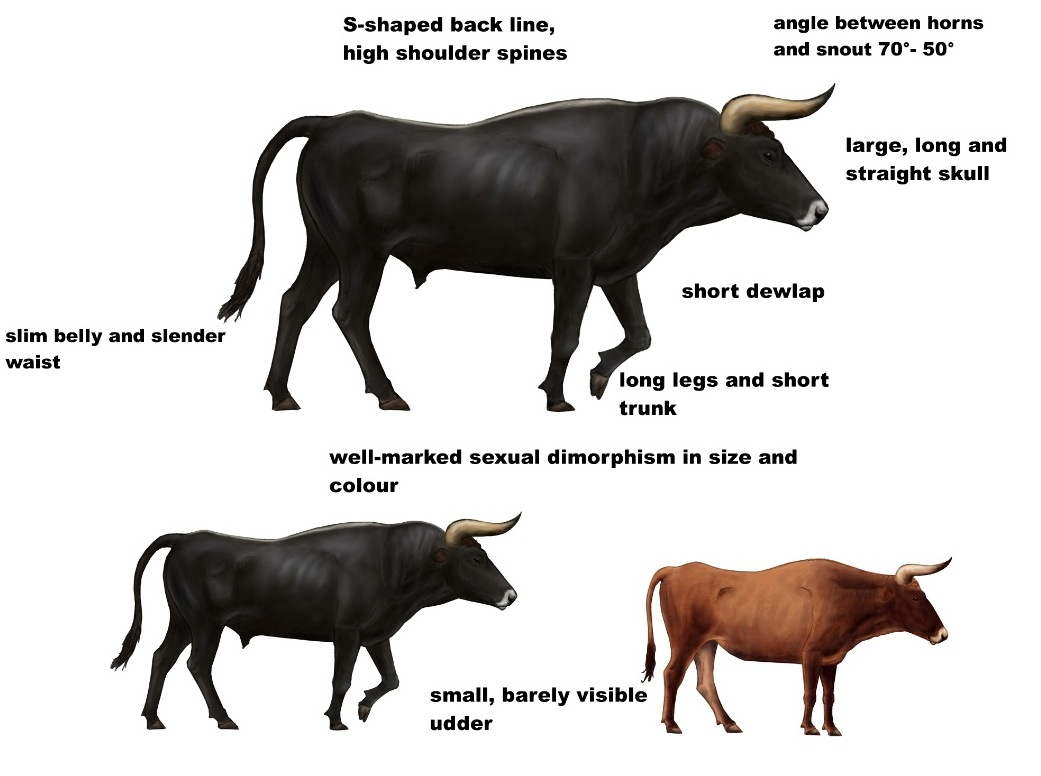
Drawing based on an aurochs bull skeleton from Lund and a cow skeleton from Cambridge, with characteristic features of the aurochs

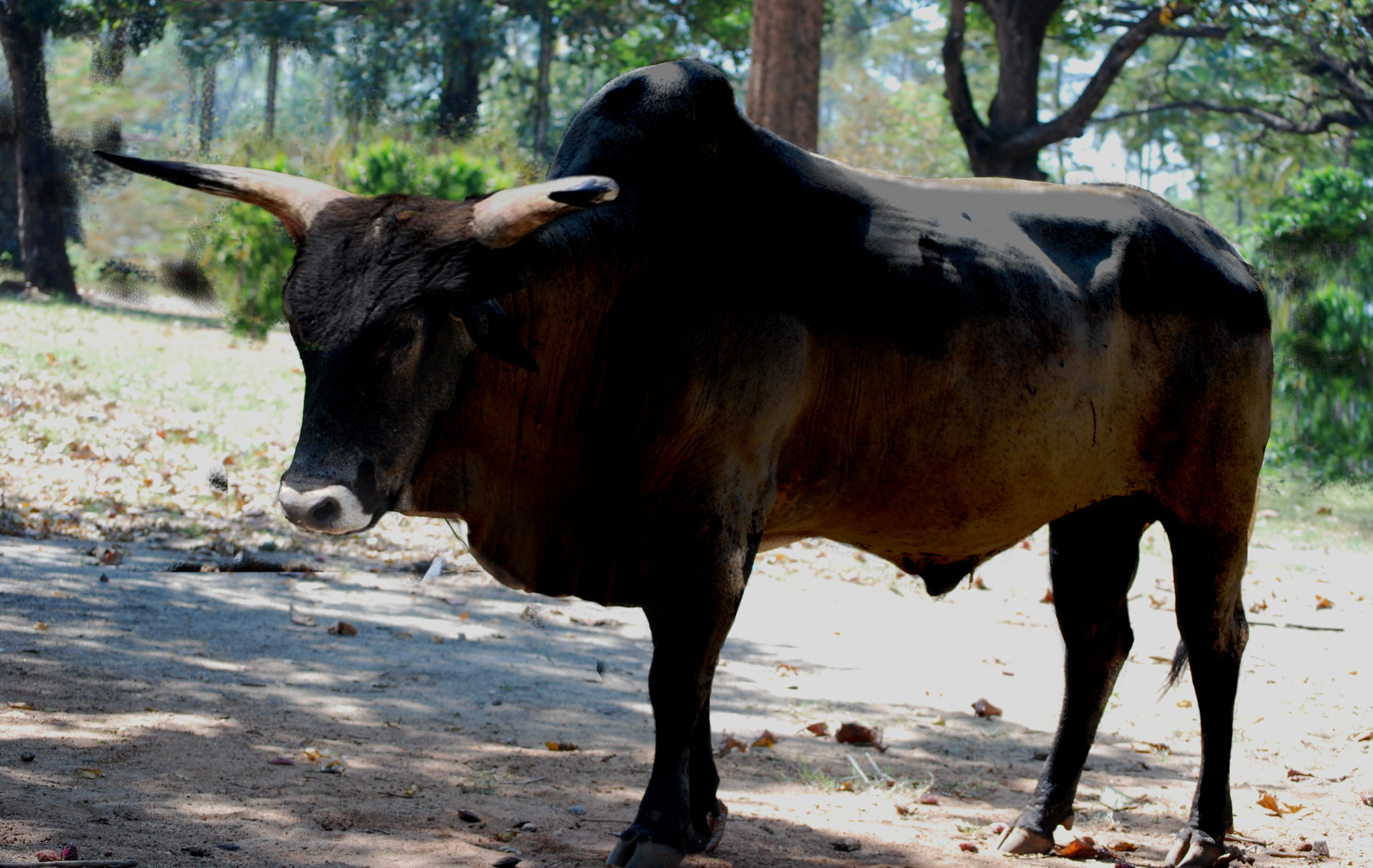
Speculative profile of an Indian aurochs

The proportions and body shape of the aurochs were strikingly different from many modern cattle breeds. For example, the legs were considerably longer and more slender, resulting in a shoulder height that nearly equalled the trunk length. The skull, carrying the large horns, was substantially larger and more elongated than in most cattle breeds. As in other wild bovines, the body shape of the aurochs was athletic, and especially in bulls, showed a strongly expressed neck and shoulder musculature. Therefore, the fore hand was larger than the rear, similar to the wisent, but unlike many domesticated cattle. Even in carrying cows, the udder was small and hardly visible from the side; this feature is equal to that of other wild bovines.

=== Size ===
Size of large male and female northern European Holocene aurochs compared to a human

The aurochs was one of the largest herbivores in Holocene Europe. The size of an aurochs appears to have varied by region, with larger specimens in northern Europe than farther south. Aurochs in Denmark and Germany ranged in height at the shoulders between 1.8 m (5 ft 11 in) in bulls and 1.35–1.55 m (4 ft 5 in – 5 ft 1 in) in cows, while aurochs bulls in Hungary reached 1.6 m (5 ft 3 in).

The African aurochs was similar in size to the European aurochs in the Pleistocene, but declined in size during the transition to the Holocene; it may have also varied in size geographically.

The body mass of aurochs appears to have shown some variability. Some individuals reached around 700 kg (1,540 lb), whereas those from the late Middle Pleistocene are estimated to have weighed up to 1,500 kg (3,310 lb). The aurochs exhibited considerable sexual dimorphism in the size of males and females.

=== Horns ===
The horns were massive, reaching 80 cm (31 in) in length and between 10 and 20 cm (3.9 and 7.9 in) in diameter. Its horns grew from the skull at a 60-degree angle to the muzzle facing forwards and were curved in three directions, namely upwards and outwards at the base, then swinging forwards and inwards, then inwards and upwards. The curvature of bull horns was more strongly expressed than horns of cows. The basal circumference of horn cores reached 44.5 cm (17.5 in) in the largest Chinese specimen and 48 cm (19 in) in a French specimen. Some cattle breeds still show horn shapes similar to that of the aurochs, such as the Spanish fighting bull, and occasionally also individuals of derived breeds.

=== Genetics ===
A well-preserved aurochs bone yielded sufficient mitochondrial DNA for a sequence analysis in 2010, which showed that its genome consists of 16,338 base pairs. Further studies using the aurochs whole genome sequence have identified candidate microRNA-regulated domestication genes. A comprehensive sequence analysis of Late Pleistocene and Holocene aurochs published in 2024 suggested that Indian aurochs (represented by modern zebu cattle) were the most genetically divergent aurochs population, having diverged from other aurochs around 300–166,000 years ago, with other aurochs populations spanning Europe and the Middle East to East Asia sharing much more recent common ancestry within the last 100,000 years. Late Pleistocene European aurochs were found to have a small (~3%) ancestry component from a divergent lineage that split prior to the divergence of Indian and other aurochs, suggested to be residual from earlier European aurochs populations. Towards the end of the Late Pleistocene, European aurochs experienced considerable gene flow from Middle Eastern aurochs. European Holocene aurochs primarily descend from those that were present in the Iberian Peninsula during the Last Glacial Maximum, with the Holocene also seeing mixing between previously isolated aurochs populations.

== Distribution and habitat ==
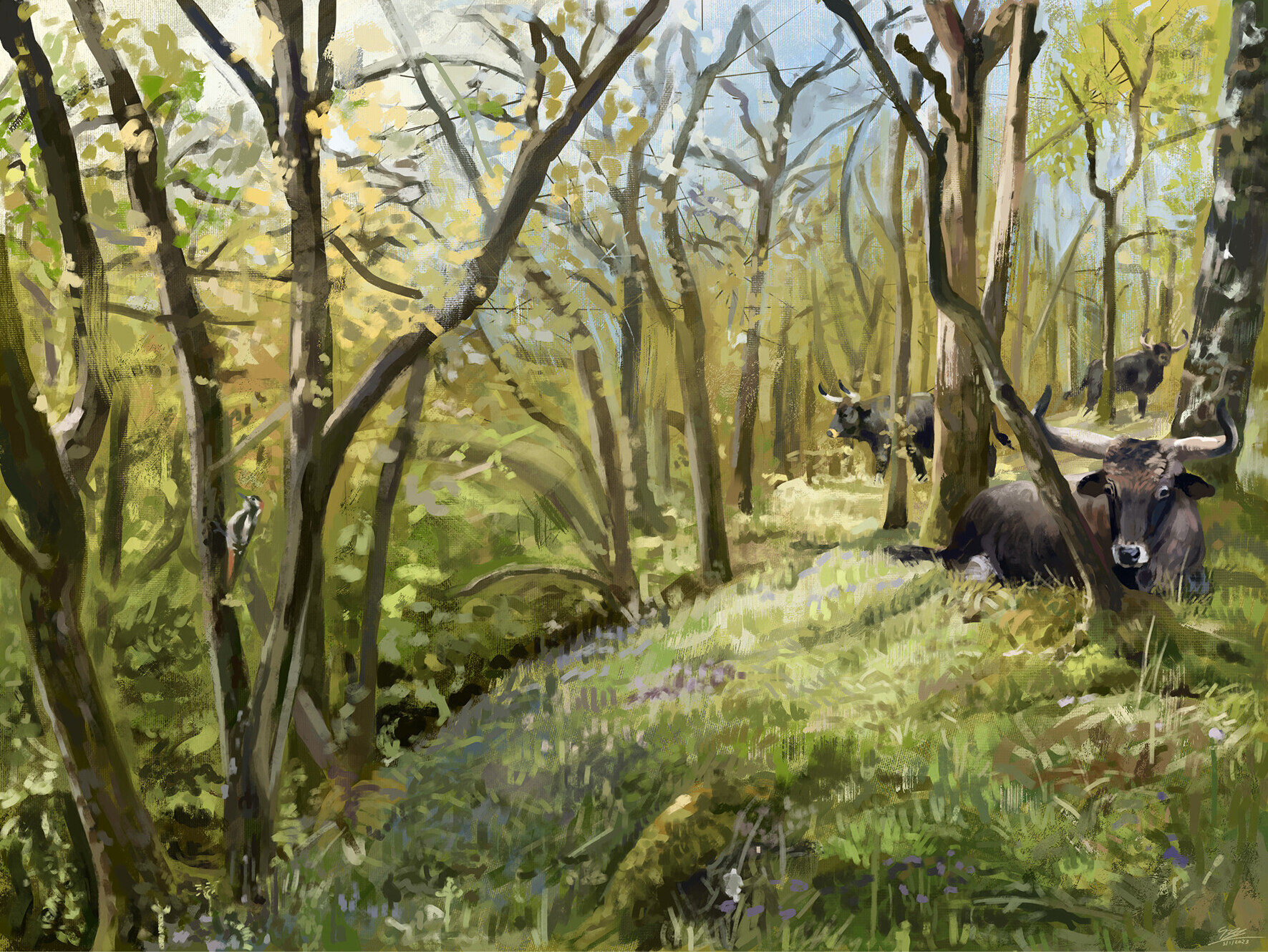
Life restoration of aurochs in a temperate forested landscape in Europe during the Eemian interglacial (130–115,000 years ago)

The aurochs was widely distributed in North Africa, Mesopotamia, and throughout Europe to the Pontic–Caspian steppe, Caucasus and Western Siberia in the west and to the Gulf of Finland and Lake Ladoga in the north.

Fossil horns attributed to the aurochs were found in Late Pleistocene deposits at an elevation of 3,400 m (11,200 ft) on the eastern margin of the Tibetan Plateau close to the Heihe River in Zoigê County that date to about 26,620 ±600 years BP. Most fossils in China were found in plains below 1,000 m (3,300 ft) in Heilongjiang, Yushu, Jilin, northeastern Manchuria, Inner Mongolia, near Beijing, Yangyuan County in Hebei province, Datong and Dingcun in Shanxi province, Huan County in Gansu and in Guizhou provinces. Ancient DNA in aurochs fossils found in Northeast China indicate that the aurochs survived in the region until at least 5,000 years BP. Fossils were also excavated on North Korea, and in the Japanese archipelago.

During warm interglacial periods the aurochs was widespread across Europe, but during glacial periods retreated into southern refugia in the Iberian, Italian and Balkan peninsulas.

Landscapes in Europe probably consisted of dense forests throughout much of the last few thousand years. The aurochs is likely to have used riparian forests and wetlands along lakes. Analysis of specimens found in Britain suggests that aurochs preferred inhabiting low lying relatively flat landscapes. Pollen of mostly small shrubs found in fossiliferous sediments with aurochs remains in China indicate that it preferred temperate grassy plains or grasslands bordering woodlands. It may have also lived in open grasslands. In the warm Atlantic period of the Holocene, it was restricted to remaining open country and forest margins, where competition with livestock and humans gradually increased leading to a successive decline of the aurochs.

== Behaviour and ecology ==
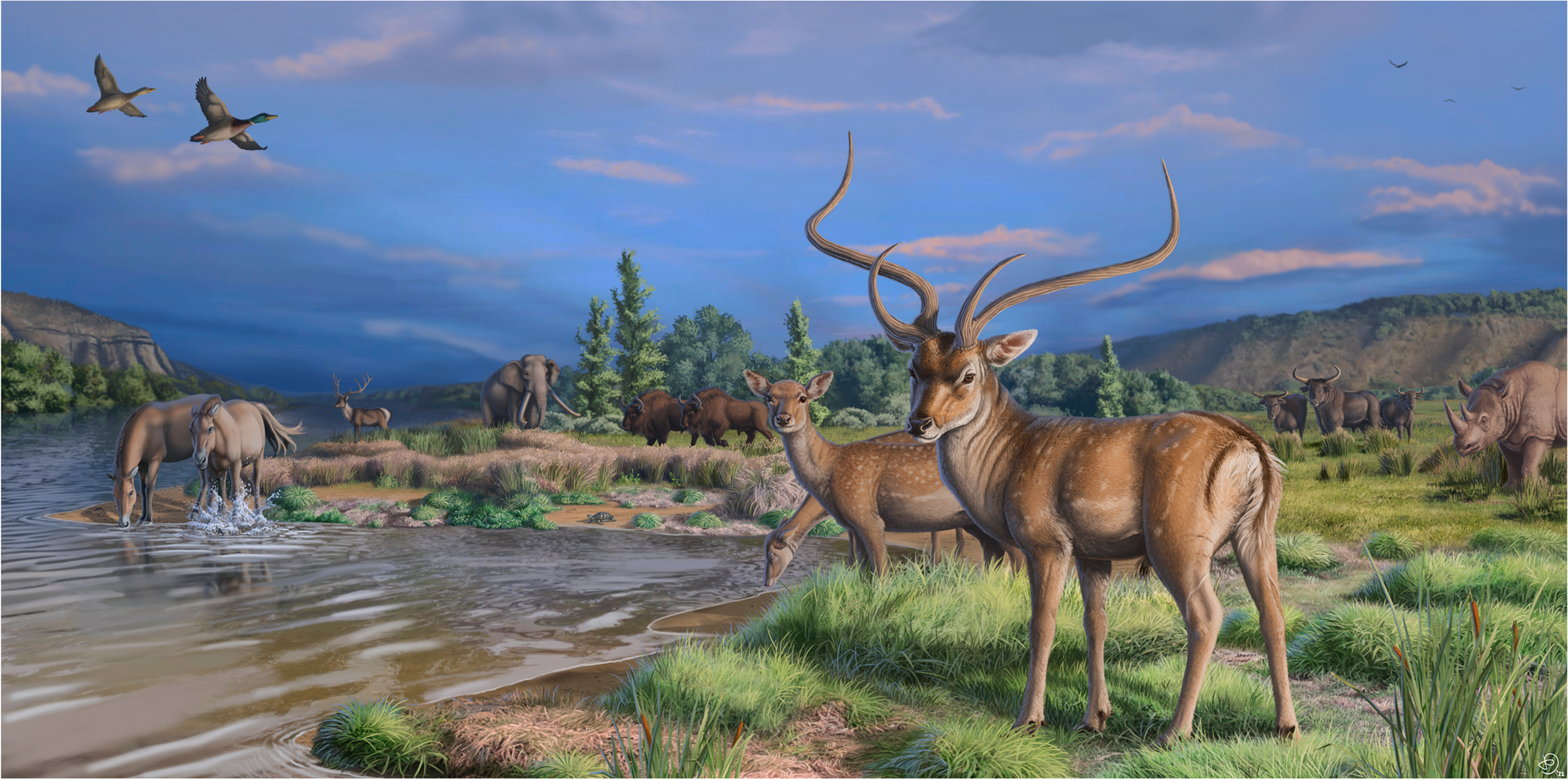
A Middle Pleistocene landscape in Spain, including aurochs (background right), as well as the extinct fallow deer Dama celiae (foreground) wild horse (left), the straight-tusked elephant (background centre-left), bison, (background centre) and the narrow-nosed rhinoceros (far right)

Aurochs formed small herds mainly in winter, but typically lived singly or in smaller groups during the summer. If aurochs had social behaviour similar to their descendants, social status would have been gained through displays and fights, in which both cows and bulls engaged. Since it has a hypsodont jaw, it has been suggested to have been a grazer, with a food selection very similar to domesticated cattle feeding on grass, twigs and acorns. Mesowear analysis of Holocene Danish aurochs premolar teeth indicates that it changed from an abrasion-dominated grazer in the Danish Preboreal to a mixed feeder in the Boreal, Atlantic and Subboreal periods. Dental microwear and mesowear analysis of specimens from the Pleistocene of Britain has found these aurochs had mixed feeding to browsing diets, rather than being strict grazers.

Mating season was in September, and calves were born in spring. Rutting bulls had violent fights, and evidence from the Jaktorów forest shows that they were fully capable of mortally wounding one another. In autumn, aurochs fed for the winter, gaining weight and possessing a shinier coat than during the rest of the year. Calves stayed with their mothers until they were strong enough to join and keep up with the herd on the feeding grounds. Aurochs calves would have been vulnerable to predation by grey wolves (Canis lupus) and brown bears (Ursus arctos), while the immense size and strength of healthy adult aurochs meant they likely did not need to fear most predators. According to historical descriptions, the aurochs was swift despite its build, could be very aggressive if provoked, and was not generally fearful of humans. In Middle Pleistocene Europe, aurochs were likely predated upon by the "European jaguar" Panthera gombaszogensis and the scimitar toothed-cat (Homotherium latidens), with evidence for the consumption of aurochs by cave hyenas (Crocuta (Crocuta) spelaea) having been found from Late Pleistocene Italy. The lion (Panthera leo), tiger (Panthera tigris) and wolf are thought to have been the aurochs' main predators during the Holocene.

During interglacial periods in the Middle Pleistocene and early Late Pleistocene in Europe, the aurochs occurred alongside other large temperate adapted megafauna species, including the straight-tusked elephant (Palaeoloxodon antiquus), Merck's rhinoceros (Stephanorhinus kirchbergensis), the narrow-nosed rhinoceros, (Stephanorhinus hemitoechus) and the Irish elk/giant deer (Megaloceros giganteus).

== Relationship with humans ==
=== In Asia ===
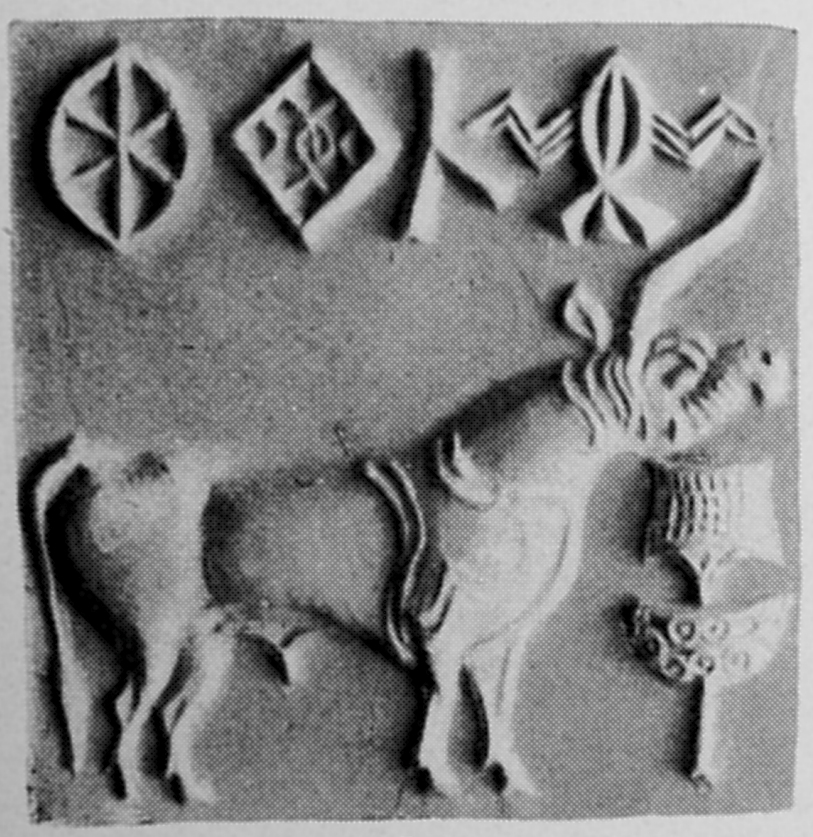
Seal from Mohenjo-daro

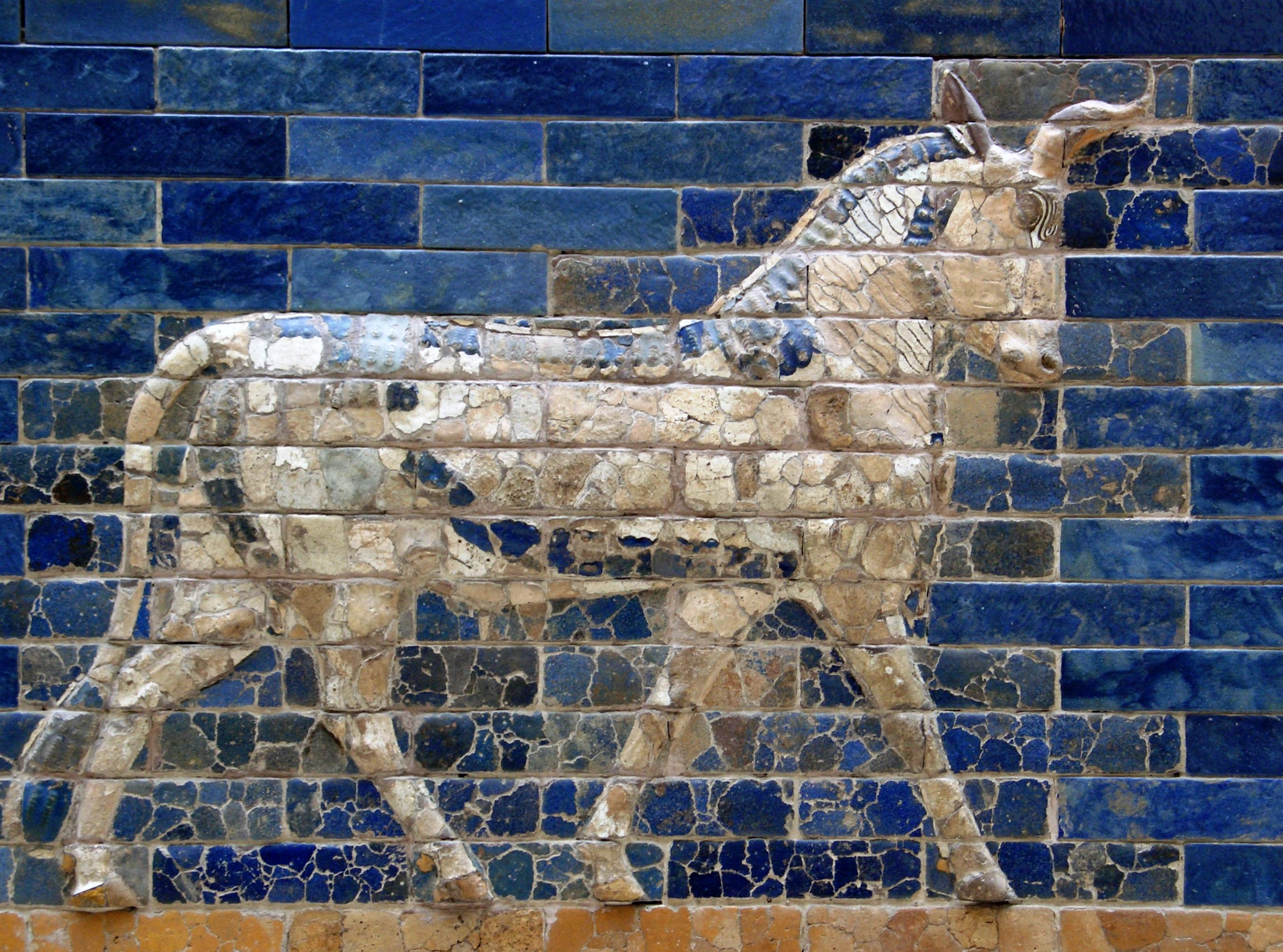
Relief on the Ishtar Gate on display at the Pergamon Museum

During the Shang dynasty in ancient China, aurochs were occasionally used for oracle bone divination, alongside the short-horned water buffalo and domestic cattle.

Acheulean layers in Hunasagi on India's southern Deccan Plateau yielded aurochs bones with cut marks. An aurochs bone with cut marks induced with flint was found in a Middle Paleolithic layer at the Nesher Ramla Homo site in Israel; it was dated to Marine Isotope Stage 5 about 120,000 years ago. An archaeological excavation in Israel found traces of a feast held by the Natufian culture around 12,000 years BP, in which three aurochs were eaten. This appears to be an uncommon occurrence in the culture and was held in conjunction with the burial of an older woman, presumably of some social status. Petroglyphs depicting aurochs in Gobustan Rock Art in Azerbaijan date to the Upper Paleolithic to Neolithic periods. Aurochs bones and skulls found at the settlements of Mureybet, Hallan Çemi and Çayönü indicate that people stored and shared food in the Pre-Pottery Neolithic B culture. Remains of an aurochs were also found in a necropolis in Sidon, Lebanon, dating to around 3,700 years BP; the aurochs was buried together with numerous animals, a few human bones and foods.

Seals dating to the Indus Valley civilisation found in Harappa and Mohenjo-daro show an animal with curved horns like an aurochs. Aurochs figurines were made by the Maykop culture in the Western Caucasus.

The aurochs is denoted in the Akkadian words rīmu and rēmu, both used in the context of hunts by rulers such as Naram-Sin of Akkad, Tiglath-Pileser I and Shalmaneser III; in Mesopotamia, it symbolised power and sexual potency, was an epithet of the gods Enlil and Shamash, denoted prowess as an epithet of the king Sennacherib and the hero Gilgamesh. Wild bulls are frequently referred to in Ugaritic texts as hunted by and sacrificed to the god Baal. An aurochs is depicted on Babylon's Ishtar Gate, constructed in the 6th century BC.

=== In Africa ===
Petroglyphs depicting aurochs found in Qurta in the upper Nile valley were dated to the Late Pleistocene about 19–15,000 years BP using luminescence dating and are the oldest engravings found to date in Africa. Aurochs are part of hunting scenes in reliefs in a tomb at Thebes, Egypt dating to the 20th century BC, and in the mortuary temple of Ramesses III at Medinet Habu dating to around 1175 BC. The latter is the youngest depiction of aurochs in Ancient Egyptian art to date.

=== In Europe ===
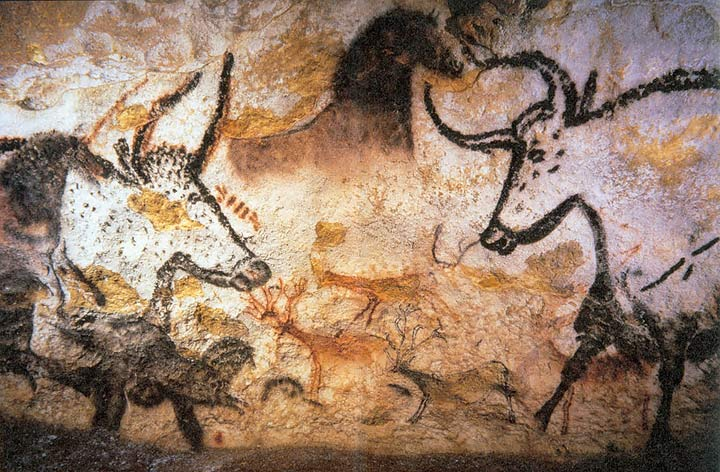
Aurochs in a cave painting in Lascaux

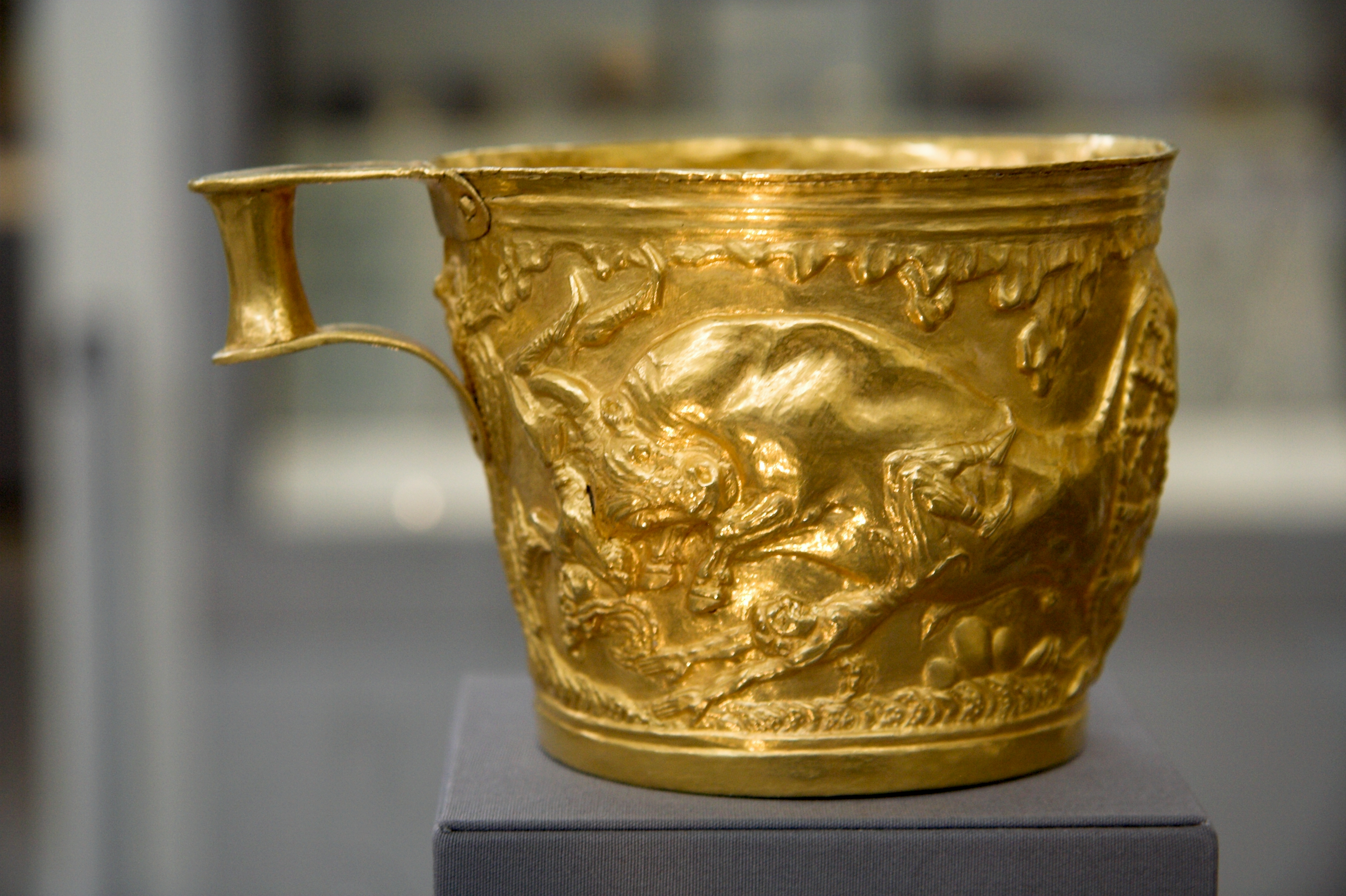
A cup from Vaphio showing an aurochs hunt, 15th century BC

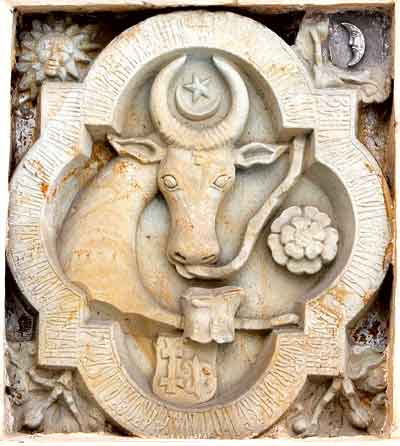
Coat of arms of Moldavia from 1481 at Putna Monastery

Evidence has been found for the butchery of aurochs by archaic hominins in Europe during the Middle Palaeolithic, such as the Biache-Saint-Vaast site in northern France dating to around 240,000 years ago, where bones of aurochs have been found burnt by fire and with cut marks, thought to have been created by Neanderthals. At the late Middle Palaeolithic Cueva Des-Cubierta site in Spain, Neanderthals are proposed to have kept the skulls of aurochs as hunting trophies.

The aurochs is widely represented in Upper Paleolithic cave paintings in the Chauvet and Lascaux caves in southern France dating to 36,000 and 21,000 years BP, respectively. Two Paleolithic rock engravings in the Calabrian Romito Cave depict an aurochs. Palaeolithic engravings showing aurochs were also found in the Grotta del Genovese on the Italian island of Levanzo. Upper Paleolithic rock engravings and paintings depicting the aurochs were also found in caves on the Iberian Peninsula dating from the Gravettian to the Magdalenian cultures. Aurochs bones with chop and cut marks were found at various Mesolithic hunting and butchering sites in France, Luxemburg, Germany, the Netherlands, England and Denmark. Aurochs bones were also found in Mesolithic settlements by the Narva and Emajõgi rivers in Estonia. Aurochs and human bones were uncovered from pits and burnt mounds at several Neolithic sites in England. A cup found in the Greek site of Vaphio shows a hunting scene, in which people try to capture an aurochs. One of the bulls throws one hunter on the ground while attacking the second with its horns. The cup seems to date to Mycenaean Greece. Greeks and Paeonians hunted aurochs and used their huge horns as trophies, cups for wine, and offerings to the gods and heroes. The ox mentioned by Samus, Philippus of Thessalonica and Antipater as killed by Philip V of Macedon on the foothills of mountain Orvilos, was actually an aurochs; Philip offered the horns, which were 105 cm (41 in) long, and the skin to a temple of Hercules. The aurochs was described in Julius Caesar's Commentarii de Bello Gallico. Aurochs were occasionally captured and exhibited in venatio shows in Roman amphitheatres such as the Colosseum. Aurochs horns were often used by Romans as hunting horns.

In the Nibelungenlied, Sigurd kills four aurochs. During the Middle Ages, aurochs horns were used as drinking horns including the horn of the last bull; many aurochs horn sheaths are preserved today. The aurochs drinking horn at Corpus Christi College, Cambridge was engraved with the college's coat of arms in the 17th century. An aurochs head with a star between its horns and Christian iconographic elements represents the official coat of arms of Moldavia perpetuated for centuries.

Aurochs were hunted with arrows, nets and hunting dogs, and its hair on the forehead was cut from the living animal; belts were made out of this hair and believed to increase the fertility of women. When the aurochs was slaughtered, the os cordis was extracted from the heart; this bone contributed to the mystique and magical powers that were attributed to it. In eastern Europe, the aurochs has left traces in expressions like "behaving like an aurochs" for a drunken person behaving badly, and "a bloke like an aurochs" for big and strong people.

== Domestication ==
The earliest-known domestication of the aurochs dates to the Neolithic Revolution in the Fertile Crescent, where cattle hunted and kept by Neolithic farmers gradually decreased in size between 9800 and 7500 BC. Aurochs bones found at Mureybet and Göbekli Tepe are larger in size than cattle bones from later Neolithic settlements in northern Syria like Dja'de el-Mughara and Tell Halula. In Late Neolithic sites of northern Iraq and western Iran dating to the sixth millennium BC, cattle remains are also smaller but more frequent, indicating that domesticated cattle were imported during the Halaf culture from the central Fertile Crescent region. Results of genetic research indicate that the modern taurine cattle (Bos taurus) arose from 80 aurochs tamed in southeastern Anatolia and northern Syria about 10,500 years ago. Taurine cattle spread into the Balkans and northern Italy along the Danube River and the coast of the Mediterranean Sea. Hybridisation between male aurochs and early domestic cattle occurred in central Europe between 9500 and 1000 BC. Analyses of mitochondrial DNA sequences of Italian aurochs specimens dated to 17–7,000 years ago and 51 modern cattle breeds revealed some degree of introgression of aurochs genes into south European cattle, indicating that female aurochs had contact with free-ranging domestic cattle. Cattle bones of various sizes found at a Chalcolithic settlement in the Kutná Hora District provide further evidence for hybridisation of aurochs and domestic cattle between 3000 and 2800 BC in the Bohemian region. Whole genome sequencing of a 6,750-year-old aurochs bone found in England was compared with genome sequence data of 81 cattle and single-nucleotide polymorphism data of 1,225 cattle. Results revealed that British and Irish cattle breeds share some genetic variants with the aurochs specimen; early herders in Britain might have been responsible for the local gene flow from aurochs into the ancestors of British and Irish cattle. The Murboden cattle breed also exhibits sporadic introgression of female European aurochs into domestic cattle in the Alps. Domestic cattle continued to diminish in both body and horn size until the Middle Ages.

Comparative analysis of single-nucleotide polymorphisms and shared alleles revealed admixture between East Asian aurochs and introduced taurine cattle in ancient China, for example at Shimao. This suggested the incorporation of local aurochs into domestic cattle as far back as 4,000 years BP, either through spontaneous introgression, or the capture of different aurochs groups to supplement domestic stocks. The same study detected derived alleles shared by aurochs and modern taurine cattle in East Asia, especially among Tibetan breeds. Introgression with local aurochs could have facilitated rapid adaptation to new environments.

The Indian aurochs is thought to have been domesticated 10,000–8,000 years ago. Aurochs fossils found at the Neolithic site of Mehrgarh in Pakistan are dated to around 8,000 years BP and represent some of the earliest evidence for its domestication on the Indian subcontinent. Female Indian aurochs contributed to the gene pool of zebu (Bos indicus) between 5,500 and 4,000 years BP during the expansion of pastoralism in northern India. The zebu initially spread eastwards to Southeast Asia. Hybridisation between zebu and early taurine cattle occurred in the Near East after 4,000 years BP coinciding with the drought period during the 4.2-kiloyear event. The zebu was introduced to East Africa about 3,500–2,500 years ago, and reached Mongolia in the 13th and 14th centuries.

A third domestication event thought to have occurred in Egypt's Western Desert is not supported by results of an analysis of genetic admixture, introgression and migration patterns of 3,196 domestic cattle representing 180 populations. However, the same study supported extensive hybridization between taurine cattle in Africa, arrived from the Near East after domestication, and local wild African aurochs prior to the entry of the zebu in Africa. The zebu was introduced through Ancient Egypt and started to spread comprehensively through West Africa in the last 1,400 years, along with Arabic cultural influences. Most modern African cattle breeds are hybridized to a variable extent with Indicine cattle, with introgression being most reduced in areas of West Africa where the tse-tse fly is present.

== Extinction ==
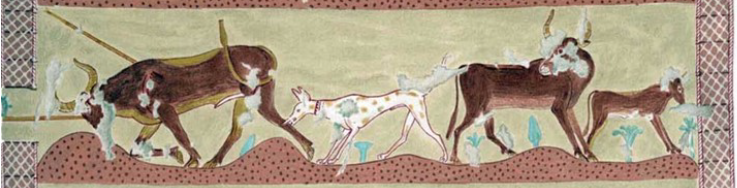
Scene from the Twelfth Dynasty tomb TT60 in Thebes, Egypt, depicting a North African aurochs bull, cow and calf being hunted with dogs and javelins.

The Indian aurochs (B. p. namadicus) became extinct sometime during the Holocene period, likely due to habitat loss caused by expanding pastoralism and interbreeding with the domestic zebu. The timing of extinction of aurochs in the Indian subcontinent is unclear, due to difficulty distinguishing aurochs remains from those of domestic cattle, with a 2021 review suggesting remains from Mehrgarh, Pakistan, dating to around 8,000 years ago "might constitute the only dated and reliably identified evidence" of Holocene Indian aurochs. The extinction probably predates the historical period, due to a lack of references to the aurochs in Indian texts.

A 2014 review suggested that the youngest remains of African aurochs (B. p. mauritanicus) dated to around 6,000 years BP (~4000 BC), though some authors suggest that it may have survived until at least the Roman period, as indicated by remains found in Buto and Faiyum in the Nile Delta.

In Northern China, aurochs persisted until at least 3,500 BP (~1500 BC), while in Northeast China, they persisted until around 3,100 BP.

European aurochs decline can probably be mainly attributed to human factors, including hunting from the Mesolithic onwards, as well a shift to land use for livestock grazing following the invention of farming. The Eurasian aurochs (B. p. primigenius) was present in southern Sweden during the Holocene climatic optimum until at least 7,800 years BP, and perhaps as late as 6,500 BP. In Denmark, the first-known local extinction of the aurochs occurred after the sea level rise on the newly formed Danish islands about 8,000–7,500 years BP, and the last documented aurochs lived in southern Jutland around 3,000 years BP. The latest-known aurochs fossil in Great Britain dates to 3,245 years BP, and it was probably extinct by 3,000 years ago. The gradual extinction of the aurochs in Central Europe was concurrent with the clearcutting of large forest tracts between the 9th and 12th centuries. By the 13th century, the aurochs existed only in small numbers in Eastern Europe, and hunting it became a privilege of nobles and later royals. The population in Hungary was declining from at least the 9th century and was extinct in the 13th century.

The last confirmed aurochs herd lived in a marshy woodland in Poland's Jaktorów Forest. It decreased from around 50 individuals in the mid 16th century to four individuals by 1601. The last widely accepted aurochs cow from Jaktorów died in 1627 from natural causes.

Findings from subfossil records indicate that wild aurochs might have survived in northwestern Transylvania until the 14th to 16th century, in western Moldavia until probably the early 17th century. A 2021 study argued that the aurochs possibly survived in northeastern Bulgaria until at least the 17th century. A horn-core excavated in 2020 in Sofia was identified as being from an aurochs; the archaeological layer in which it was found was dated to the second half of the 17th or first half of the 18th century, suggesting that aurochs may have survived in Bulgaria until that date.

== Breeding of aurochs-like cattle ==
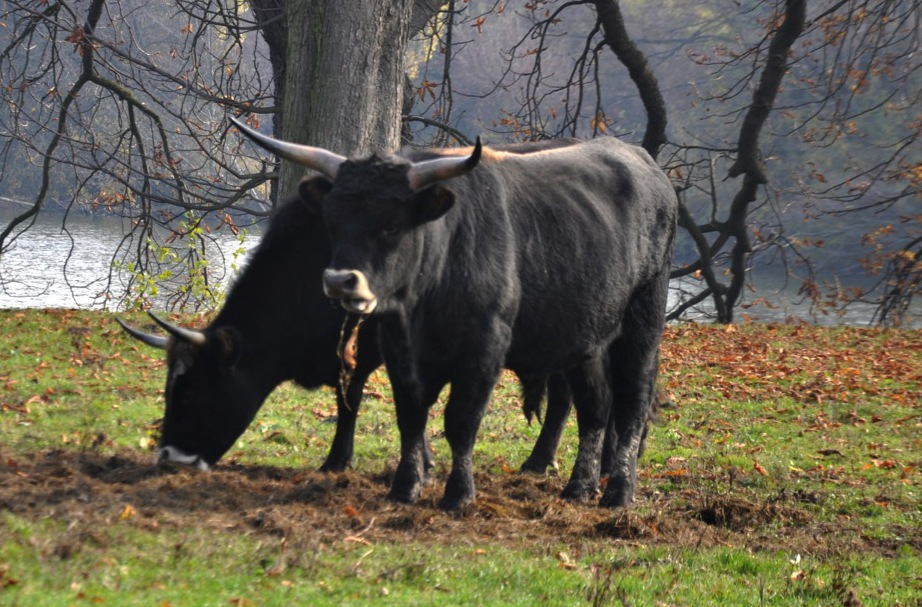
Heck cattle in Lainzer Tiergarten

In the early 1920s, Heinz Heck initiated a selective breeding program in Hellabrunn Zoo attempting to breed back the aurochs using several cattle breeds; the result is called Heck cattle. Herds of these cattle were released to Oostvaardersplassen, a polder in the Netherlands in the 1980s as aurochs surrogates for naturalistic grazing with the aim to restore prehistorical landscapes. Large numbers of them died of starvation during the cold winters of 2005 and 2010, and the project of no interference ended in 2018.

Starting in 1996, Heck cattle were crossed with southern European cattle breeds such as Sayaguesa Cattle, Chianina and to a lesser extent Spanish Fighting Bulls in the hope of creating a more aurochs-like animal. The resulting crossbreeds are called Taurus cattle. Other breeding-back projects are the Tauros Programme and the Uruz Project. However, approaches aiming at breeding an aurochs-like phenotype do not equate to an aurochs-like genotype.

== See also ==
- Ur (rune)
- Sacred bull
- Chillingham cattle
- De-extinction, specially about Aurochs
