= List of Austrian cattle breeds =

This is a list of some of the cattle breeds considered in Austria to be wholly or partly of Austrian origin. Some may have complex or obscure histories, so inclusion here does not necessarily imply that a breed is predominantly or exclusively Austrian.

== Extant breeds ==
- Ennstaler Bergscheck
- Kärntner Blondvieh
- Murbodner
- Original Braunvieh
- Österreichisches Braunvieh
- Österreichisches Gelbvieh
- Pinzgauer
- Pustertaler Sprinzen
- Tiroler Grauvieh
- Tux-Zillertaler
- Waldviertler Blondvieh

== Extinct breeds ==
- Jochberger Hummeln
- Lechtaler
- Mölltaler
- Mürztal
- Oststeirisches Fleckvieh
- Steirisches Braunvieh
- Tiroler Braunvieh
- Wipptaler
- Zillertaler
