= Addaura =

- Comune
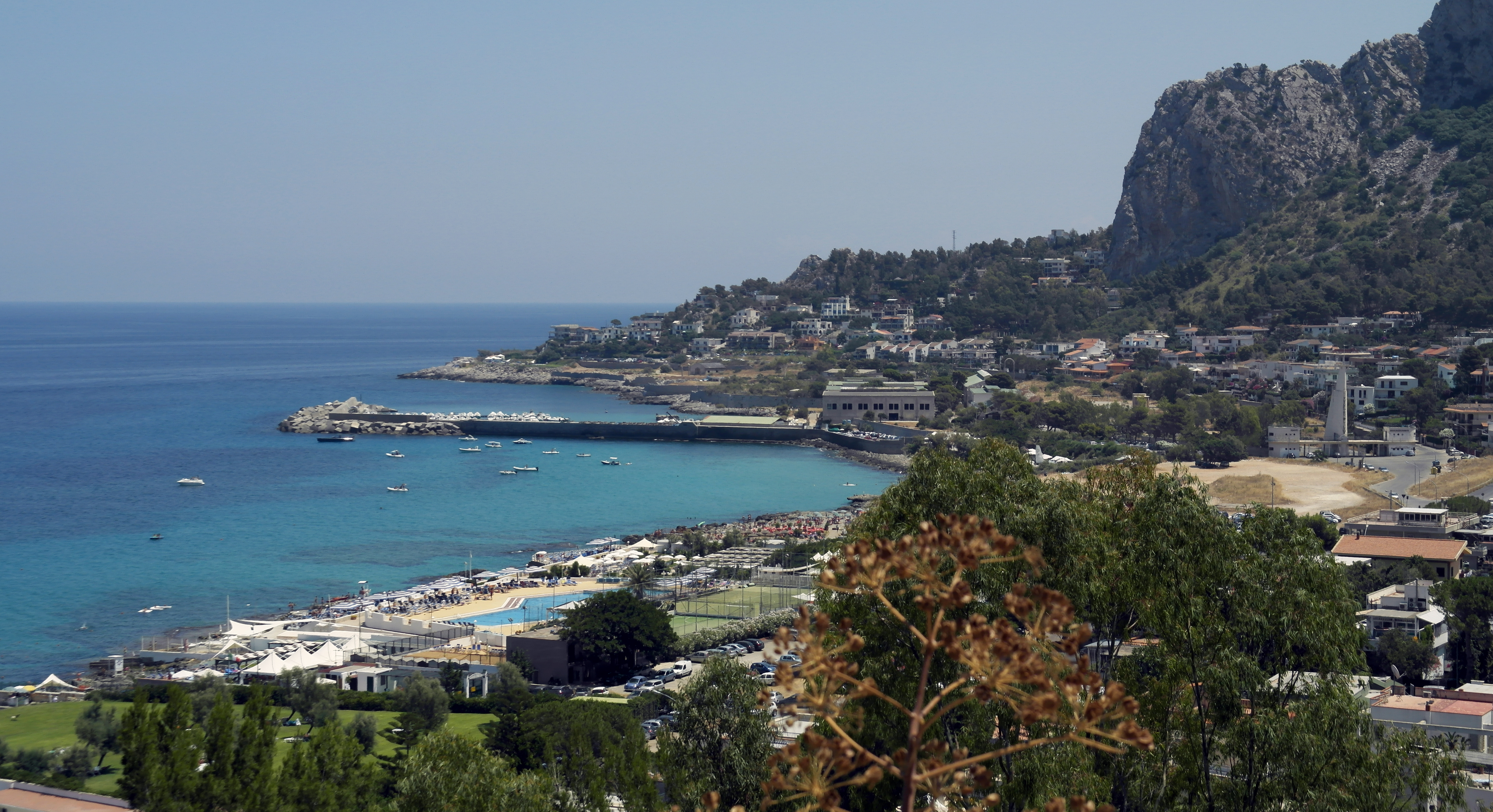

- Flag

- Location within Sicily Location within Italy
- Coordinates: 38°06′40″N 13°21′06″E
- Country: Italy
- Region: Sicily
- Metropolitan city: Palermo (PA)
- Frazioni: yes

Population
  - Total: 950
- Demonym(s): Palermitano; Panormito; Palermitan (English)
- Time zone: UTC+1 (CET)
  - Summer (DST): UTC+2 (CEST)
- Postal code: 90149
- Dialing code: 091
- ISTAT code: 082053
- Patron saint: Saint Rosalia, Saint Agata, Saint Oliva and Saint Benedict the Moor

Addaura is a seaside village (or frazione) of Palermo, in Sicily, Italy. It falls within the 7th municipal division and the 22nd major neighborhood (or quartiere) of the city, Partanna-Mondello.

The neighborhood develops along the Christopher Columbus Seafront (in Italian, Lungomare Cristoforo Colombo), which starts from the south-east border of Mondello Bay and reaches the city center of Palermo bypassing Mount Pellegrino.

The area has a strong historical and naturalistic interest due to the presence of the Addaura Cave, one of the largest archaeological heritages in Sicily and a place of exceptional importance for the study of prehistoric art. It is one of the few sites that preserves engravings of Paleolithic and Mesolithic communities.

Addaura is part of the "Places of the Heart" list promoted by the FAI (Fondo Ambiente Italiano), the Italian National Trust.

== Toponymy ==
The oldest document in which the area appears to be mentioned is a written statement (or declaratio in Latin) by King Charles I of Anjou dated 1270, where it is referred to with the ancient name of Daura.

Based on the work Evagrii Historia Ecclesiastica by Henricus Valesius, published in 1673, the Italian historian Rosario La Duca suggested that the name Daura may be an alteration of the Ancient Greek word laura, which refers to a community of religious people who led a solitary life in groups of cells formed by small huts or caves, separated from each other.

The discovery of ceramic fragments from the Middle Ages and the Renaissance in many caves and small cavities in the area confirm that the place was known for hosting communities of hermits. For this reason, it is very likely that the toponym Daura referred to the monastic order widespread when the area was still a fiefdom owned by the Church of Palermo. In a notarial deed of the end of the 16th century, the former feud or estate is, in fact, called Alaura, later transformed into Allaura and finally Sicilianized into Addaura.

== History ==
=== Prehistory ===
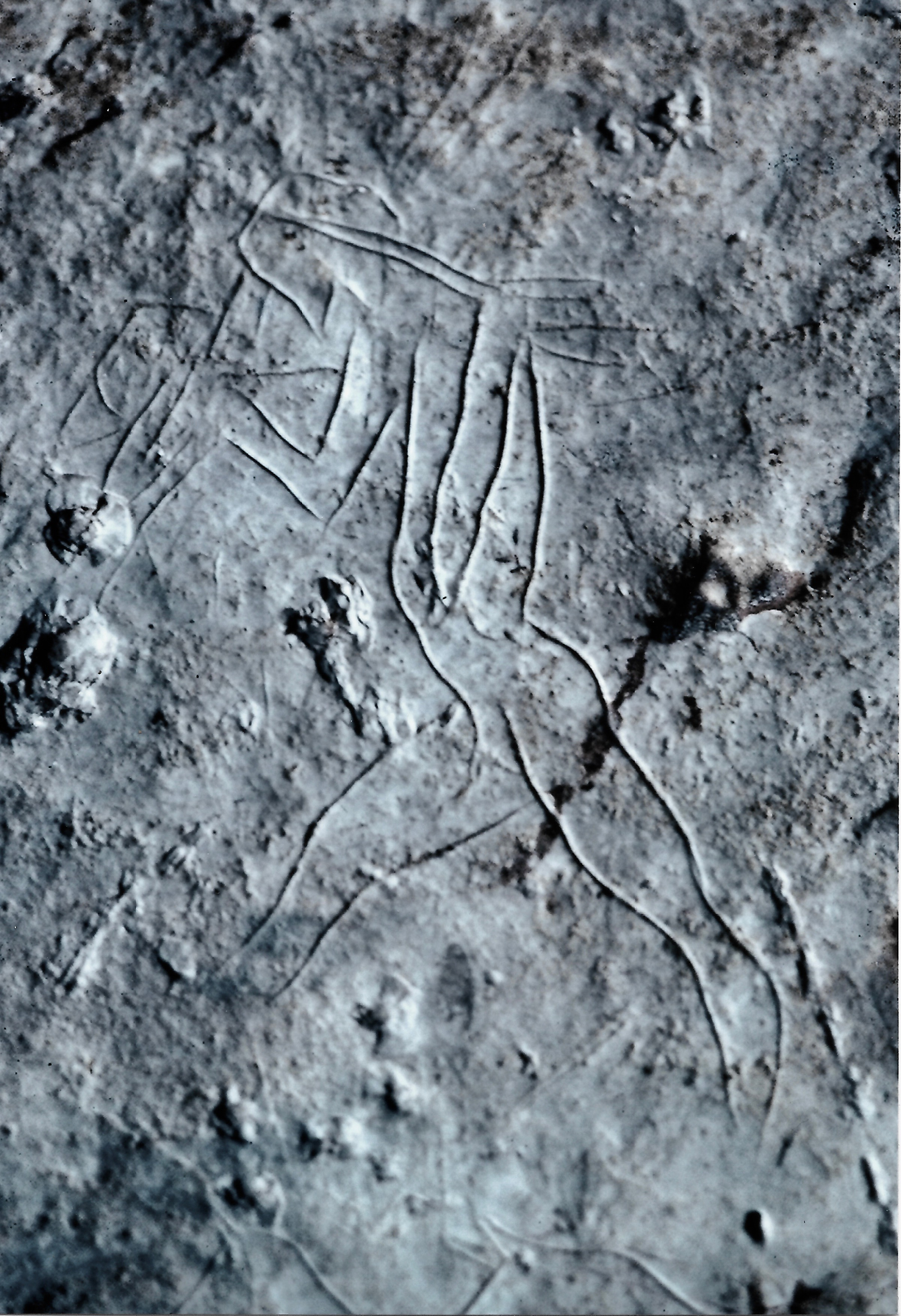
One of the characters of the prehistoric engraving in the cave of Addaura

The first evidence of human settlements in the area dates back to the Paleolithic, when prehistoric tribes colonized the caves of Mount Pellegrino. It was a society without hierarchy and whose existence was initially liked to hunting activity.

=== Middle Ages and early modern period ===
From historical evidence, it appears that around the 13th century the area was a fief of the Roman Catholic Archdiocese of Palermo and that the caves of Mount Pellegrino were used as a place of spiritual retreat by the hermit monks.

The first group of houses came after the construction of the Addaura's port in the 16th century, which led to the birth of an economy based on fishing. However, the newly built village had to face frequent assaults by Barbary corsairs, who between the 15th and 18th centuries dramatically intensified their raids against the Sicilian coastal villages and towns. The Senate of Palermo responded to the threat by building a network of watchtowers along the coast, which allowed to intercept enemy vessels in time and prepare the defense of the various seaside villages. One of them, the Rotolo Tower (Torre del Rotolo in Italian) was built on the border between Addaura and the hamlet of Vergine Maria: it was one of the first to be designed and therefore less refined than more recent examples. For this reason, it was intended for short distance sightings.

=== Modern and contemporary era ===
In the second half of the 19th century some researches led to the discovery of important paleontological and palethnological finds in the Addaura Caprara cave. The event met with considerable success in the international scientific panorama and gave rise to a lasting campaign of excavations and explorations that quickly extended to the nearby promontories.

In 1918, a subsidiary of the Italia Marittima shipping company called Lloyd Adriatico Meridionale built a shipyard for the construction of boats in the coastal strip of the neighborhood.

After World War II, the buildings of the shipyard were modified to found the Roosevelt Institute, a colony for Sicilian war orphans built with the financial support of the federal government of the United States. It was inaugurated in 1948 by the Vice President of the Italian Council of Ministers, Giuseppe Saragat. The institute was later entrusted to the vocation fathers who provided to found a parish church within the area, still active.

Archaeological investigations in the area were also resumed in 1946, with two short excavation campaigns conducted by researchers Luigi Bernabò Brea and Jole Bovio Marconi in the area in front of the Addaura II Grotto. The presence on the site of a military arsenal of the German army, including some unexploded ordnance, made it impossible to explore the entire cave: its explosion a few years later, accidental according to some or controlled by the allied military authorities according to another version, damaged a large portion of the mountain but also had the effect of allowing the discovery of the Grotta delle Incisioni. Thus, just two years after the discovery of the Grotta del Genovese on the island of Levanzo, Sicily returned to the center of the international debate on rock art for the reporting, in December 1954, of a new natural cavity with evidence of wall representations to Addaura.

On June 21, 1989, an attack on Judge Giovanni Falcone by the Cosa Nostra was foiled in the hamlet: some bombs hidden at the foot of the Judge's villa in Addaura were discovered before they were triggered. This event remained known as the Addaura attack. Giovanni Falcone, after this failed attack, died three years later in the Capaci massacre which took place on May 23, 1992.

Today, the Addaura is a purely residential neighborhood, with a strong tourist attraction during the summer season.

In addition to the parish, the Roosevelt Institute hosts the Superintendence for the Cultural and Environmental Heritage of the Sea: however, most of the buildings located within its perimeter are not exploited and since 2017 some associations have been negotiating with the Sicilian Region and the Municipality of Palermo for the redevelopment of the site, through the creation of an urban park overlooking the gulf where various realities dedicated to scientific research and tourism would settle. In December 2019, the regional government announced the start of work to transform the former Roosevelt into an international research center of the Sicilian Region for the environment and health.

== Geography ==
=== Territory ===
Addaura is located on the northern coast of Palermo, at the base of the northern slope of Mount Pellegrino. It appears as a narrow strip of land, enclosed between a low cliff and the steep walls of the mountain, accessible by means of some passes that appear to have been used since prehistoric times. It is characterized by a rocky promenade with numerous sandy-bottom inlets, bordered by a thick pine forest.

In the massive steep of Mount Pellegrino, which overlooks the entire neighborhood, there are several cavities originating from marine erosion and which constitute a heritage of extreme naturalistic and historical importance. Of this cave complex, there are four main caves, which from east to west are:

- Perciata Cave (also known as Addaura Grande Cave or Big Addaura Cave in English)
- Caprara Cave
- Cave of Bovidae (also known as Antro Nero or Black Cave in English)
- Cave of Engravings

Perciata and Caprara caves present internal karst phenomena that have created tunnels long for hundred of meters, therefore they are distinguished by their articulated internal developments and are known for their speleological importance.

== Related items ==
- Grotta dell'Addaura
- Monte Pellegrino
- Attack of the Addaura
- Mondello
