= Grotta dell'Addaura =

Cave and archaeological site in Italy

Addaura grottoes
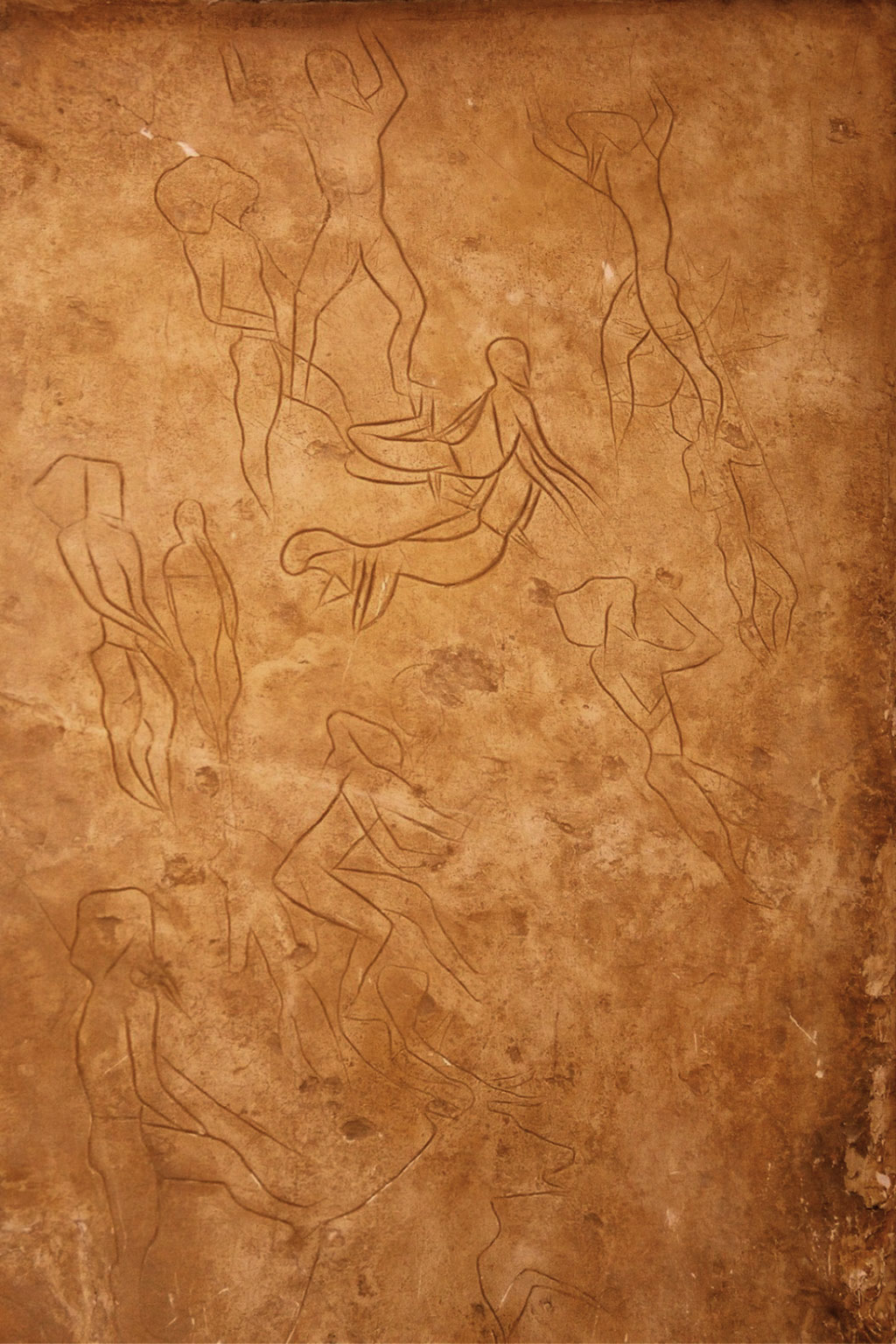
- The graffiti of Addaura
- Interactive map of Addaura grottoes
- Location: Palermo, Sicily
- Coordinates: 38°11′15″N 13°21′8″E
- Elevation: 70 metres (230 ft)
- Discovery: 1952

The Addaura cave (Italian: Grotta dell'Addaura) is a complex of three natural grottoes located on the northeast side of Mount Pellegrino in Palermo, Sicily, Southern Italy. The importance of the complex is due to the presence of cave-wall engravings dated to the late Epigravettian (contemporaneous with the Magdalenian) and the Mesolithic.

On the side of Mount Pellegrino, overlooking Palermo, to the southeast of Mondello beach at 70 metres (230 ft) above sea level, there are some open grottoes and cavities where bones and tools used for hunting have been found, attesting the presence of humans who lived in them beginning in the Paleolithic and into the Mesolithic. The finds are now conserved in Palermo's Regional Archaeological Museum. Their importance is mainly due to the presence of an extraordinary complex of rock engravings that decorate the walls, constituting a unique case in the panorama of prehistoric cave art. The name Addaura comes from Arabic: الدورة al-dawrah, 'the circuit'.

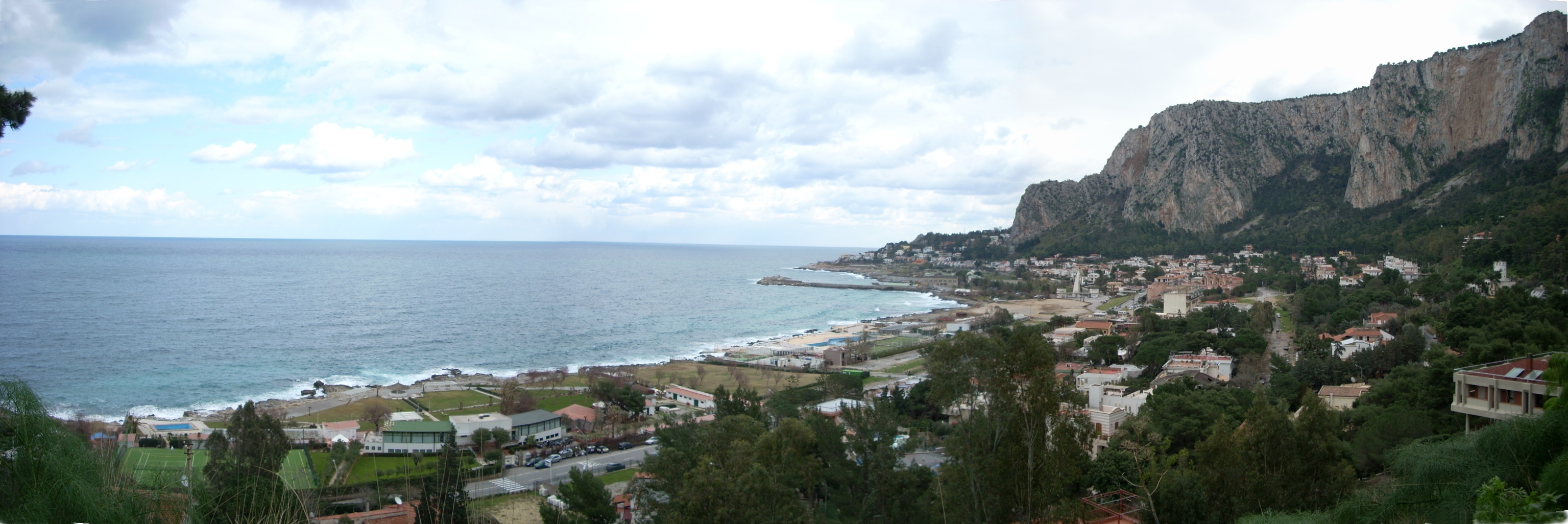
View of the village of Addaura on the north coast of Sicily; Monte Pellegrino is on the right and the caves are in the mountain face overlooking the village

== History ==
The discovery of the graffiti of Addaura was recent and came about quite casually. The three grottoes that make up the Addaura complex in the massif of Mount Pellegrino had already been studied by paleoanthropologists, as the skeleton of a dwarf elephant had been discovered there.

It was after the 1943 Allied invasion of Sicily and their arrival in Palermo that the Allies, in search of a suitable site, decided to use the grottoes for storing munitions and explosives. The accidental explosion of the arsenal at the end of the war brought about the crumbling of the main grotto walls and the collapse of a rock wall, bringing to light the graffiti covered with the patina of time. The graffiti were carefully studied by the archaeologist Jole Bovio Marconi, whose studies were published in 1953.

Since 1997 the Addaura grottoes are no longer open for visitors; the site was closed because of the danger of falling boulders, due to the instability of the rocky ridge above. As of 2012, the necessary measures to reinforce the ridge have not been implemented, and the site is in a state of decay from vandalism.

== The rock carvings ==
In one of the grottoes is found a vast and rich complex of carvings, dated between the late Epigravettian and the Mesolithic, depicting men and animals. Amid a large group of bovids, wild horses, and deer, there is represented a scene dominated by the presence of human figures: a group of characters, arranged in a circle, surrounding two central figures with their heads covered and their bodies strongly arched back. The most conflicting hypotheses have been put forward on the question of the identity of these two characters and the significance of their position inside the group. According to some scholars, it might show acrobats caught in the act of playing games that require a particular ability. According to others there is depicted the scene of a ritual that called for the sacrifice of two persons guided by a shaman. To bear out this interpretation, there has been pointed out the presence around the necks and at the sides of the characters of cords that force their bodies into an unnatural and painful backbend. Perhaps it is a ritual that calls for self-strangulation, something that is attested in other cultures. In line with this explanation, the two masked figures around the two sacrificed characters would be shamans attending an initiation ceremony. Other scholars, including the discoverer Jole Bovio Marconi herself, have read the two male figures as a homoerotic image.

The Addaura carvings represent a figurative cycle of the greatest interest because of the unusual attention dedicated to representation of the surrounding scenery, an extreme case in all of Paleolithic art. The treatment of the human figure, even within the context of a stylistic trend present in the Mediterranean basin, especially on Levanzo (Grotta del Genovese), and in the Franco-Cantabrian region, and even though using the same techniques, is something absolutely new as to stylistic forms and spirit in the Addaura grotto, compared to the other finds.

== Bibliography ==
- Bernabò Brea, Luigi (1966). Sicily Before the Greeks (Rev. ed.). New York: Praeger.
- Mannino, Marcello A.; et al. (November 2011). "Upper Palaeolithic hunter-gatherer subsistence in Mediterranean coastal environments: an isotopic study of the diets of the earliest directly-dated humans from Sicily". Journal of Archaeological Science. 38 (11): 3094–3100. Bibcode:2011JArSc..38.3094M. doi:10.1016/j.jas.2011.07.009. hdl:10447/61514.
- Spoto, Salvatore (2002). Sicilia antica: usi, costumi e personaggi dalla preistoria alla società greca, nell'isola culla della civiltà europea (in Italian). Rome: Newton & Compton. ISBN 88-8289-750-8.
