= Organ of Bojanus =

Excretory gland in some animals belonging to the phylum Mollusca

The organs of Bojanus or Bojanus organs are excretory glands that serve the function of kidneys in some of the molluscs. In other words, these are metanephridia that are found in some molluscs, for example in the bivalves. Some other molluscs have another type of organ for excretion called Keber's organ.

The Bojanus organ is named after Ludwig Heinrich Bojanus, German physician and naturalist, who first described it. The excretory system of a bivalve consists of a pair of kidneys called the organ of bojanus. These are situated one of each side of the body below the pericardium. Each kidney consist of 2 part (1)- glandular part (2)- a thin walled ciliated urinary bladder.
