= Ennstaler Bergscheck =

Breed of cattle

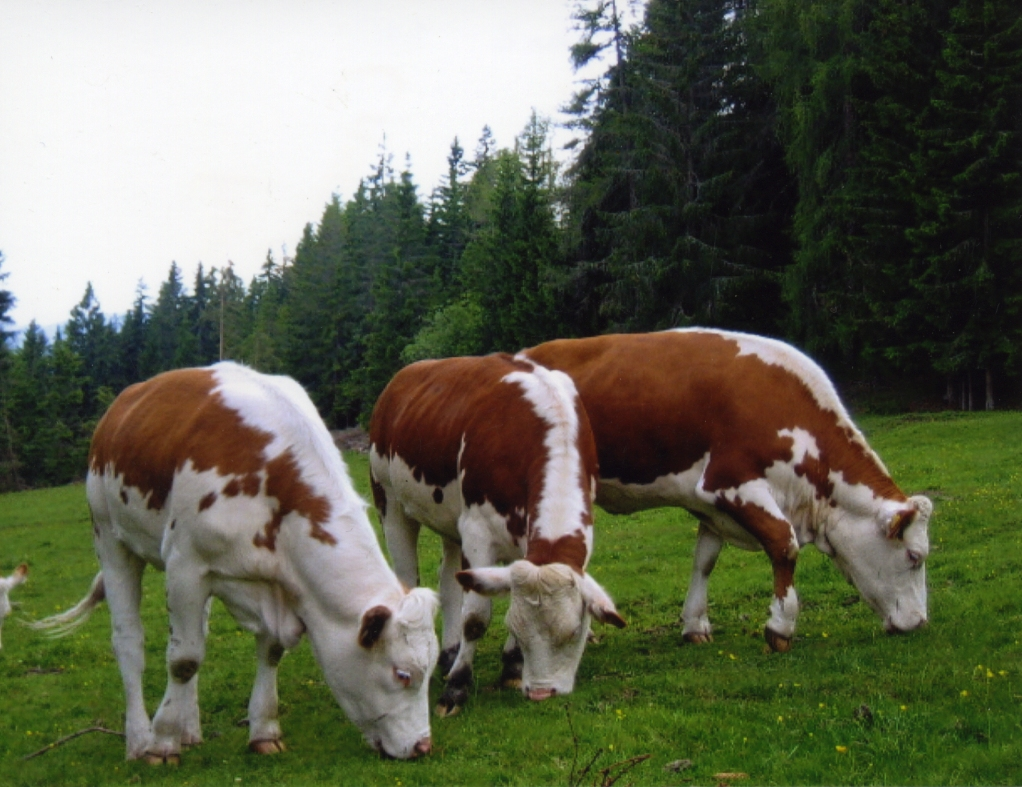
Ennstal Mountain Pied Cattle

The Ennstaler Bergscheck ("Ennstal Mountain Pied Cattle") is an endangered Austrian breed of domestic cattle. The name comes from the Ennstal, the valley of the Enns River.

The small light Ennstaler Bergscheck was long believed to have originated from the Bavarian Weißkopfscheck ("White-headed Pied Cattle") but recent archaeological discoveries indicate descent from the local cattle of the La Tène period (5th–1st centuries BC). Once they were almost totally foxy red before the white spots in their fur increased, until 75%–80% of the fur was white with only the loin and the side remaining clouded or with fringed spots. The inner ears are coloured. Horns, hooves and mucosas are mostly pigment free.

The breed was once popular as a draft and beef animal but in the 18th century was replaced by Murboden Cattle, Pinzgau Cattle, or Carinthian Blondvieh. The animals are fully developed after two years in the Alps, so they count as the earliest maturing alpine cattle breed. Although they do not become fat their beef is well marbled.

It was thought that the last two cows had been slaughtered in 1986, but some surviving animals were found. Their conservation is organised by the Union for the Conservation of Endangered Domestic Animal Breeds (VEGH) and the Austrian National Union for Gene Reserves. By the year 2004, the population in Austria had returned to 65 animals on 6 farms.

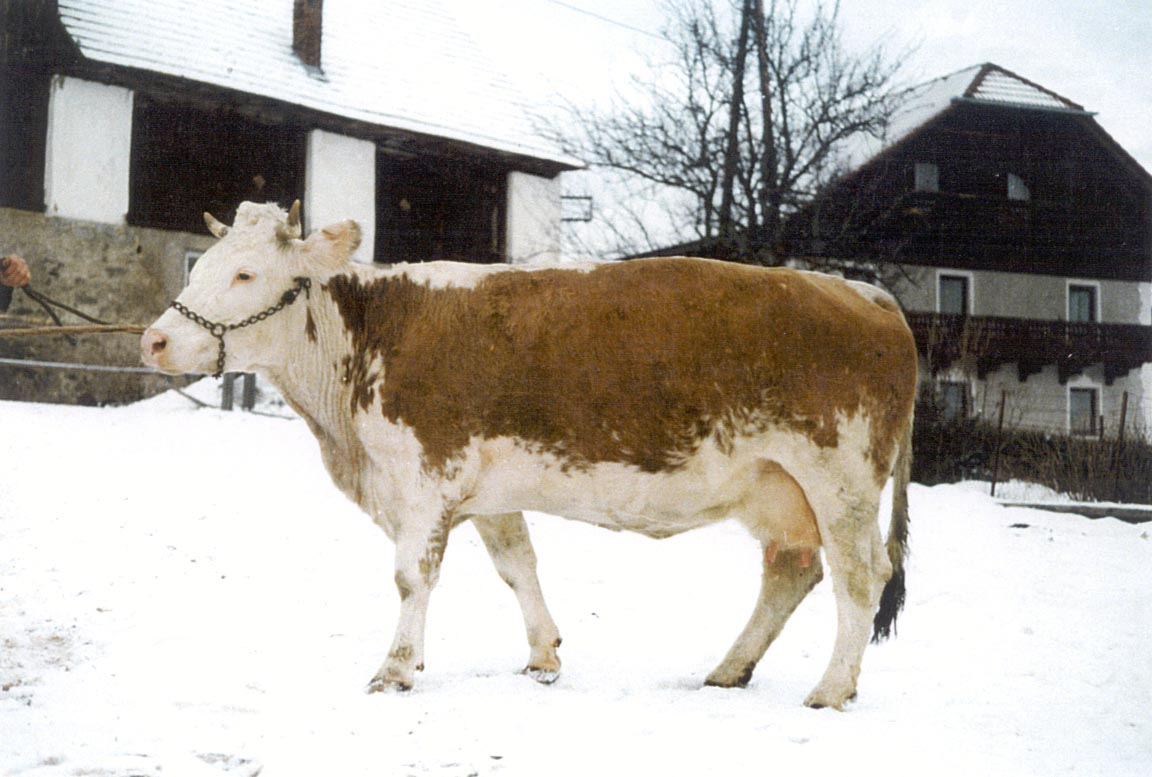

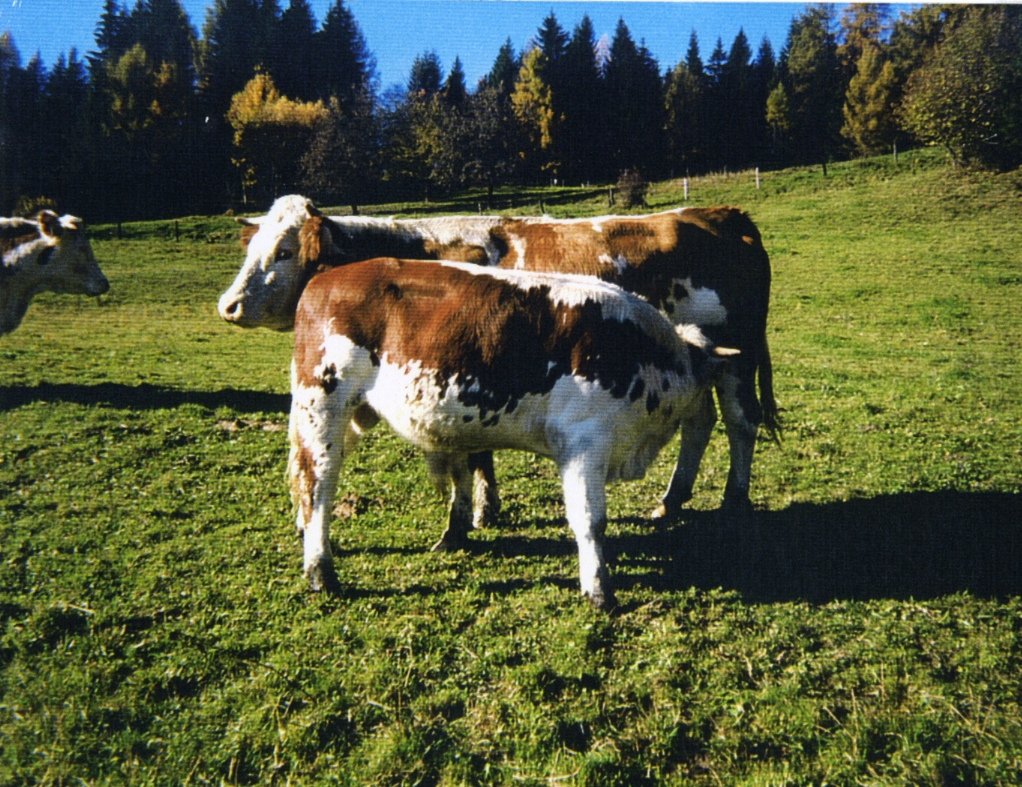

== Sources ==
- Bundesministerium für Nachhaltigkeit und Tourismus: Ennstaler Bergscheck (in German)
- Seltene Nutztierrassen: Handbuch der Vielfalt, p 51. Vienna 2009 (pdf) (in German)
