= Kleinlobming =

- Former municipality
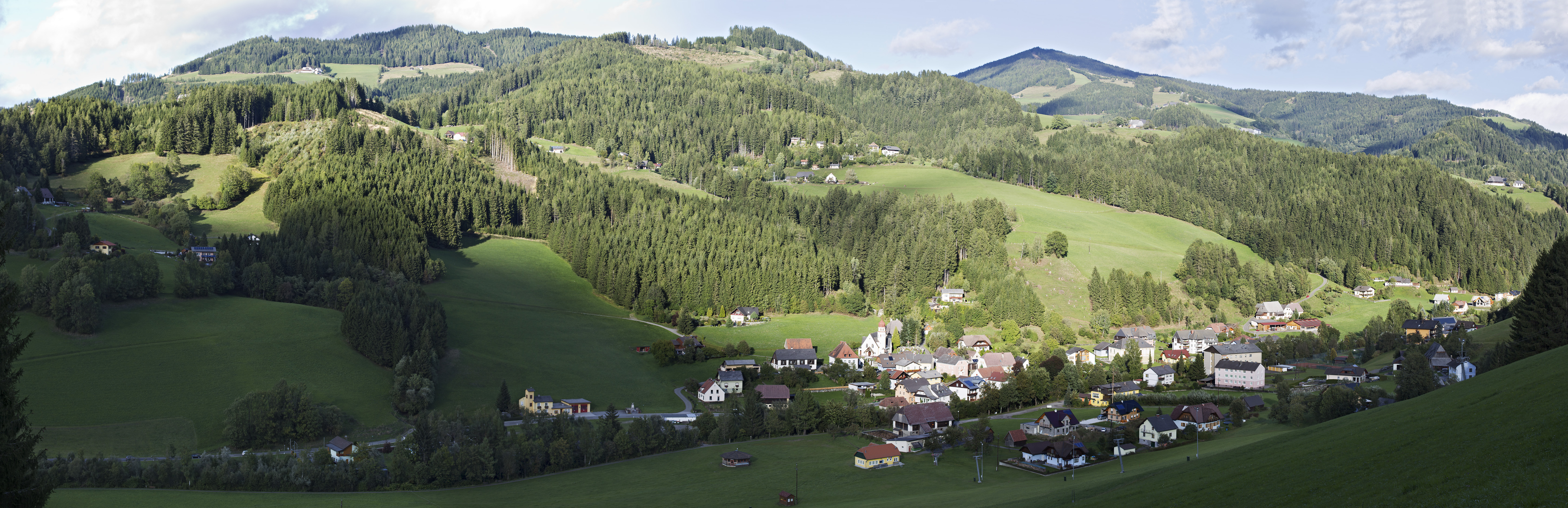
- View of Kleinlobming

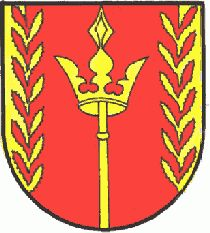
- Coat of arms

- Location within Austria
- Coordinates: 47°09′00″N 14°50′50″E
- Country: Austria
- State: Styria
- District: Murtal

Area
  - Total: 47.12 km^{2} (18.19 sq mi)
- Elevation: 759 m (2,490 ft)

Population (1 January 2016)
  - Total: 631
  - Density: 13.4/km^{2} (34.7/sq mi)
- Time zone: UTC+1 (CET)
  - Summer (DST): UTC+2 (CEST)
- Postal code: 8592, 8734, 8741
- Area code: 03516
- Vehicle registration: KF
- Website: www.kleinlobming.at/index_gemeinde.htm

Kleinlobming is a village and former municipality in the Bezirk Murtal in Styria, Austria. Since the 2015 Styria municipal structural reform, it is part of the municipality Großlobming.
