= Ludwig Heinrich Bojanus =

German physician and naturalist

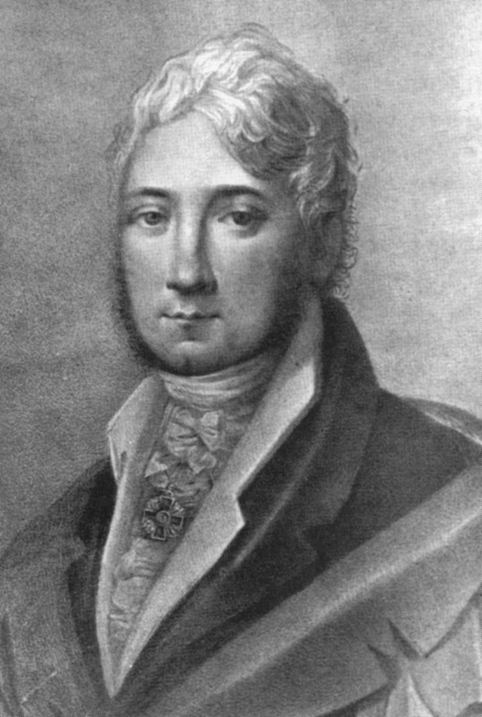
- Lithograph by Mateusz Przybylski in the Musée National de Lituanie, Vilnius
- Born: July 16, 1776
- Died: April 2, 1827 (aged 50)

Signature
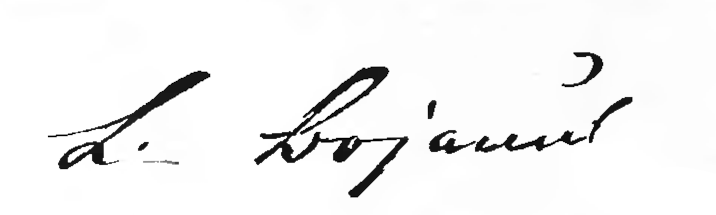

Ludwig Heinrich Bojanus Latinized as Ludovicus Henricus Bojanus (16 July 1776 – 2 April 1827) was a German physician, comparative anatomist, and naturalist who spent most of his active career teaching veterinary medicine at Vilnius University in Vilnius, then within the Russian Empire. His greatest work was a two-volume folio on the anatomy of the turtle Emys orbicularis published in 1819 and 1821. The Organ of Bojanus of molluscs is named after him. The Triassic mammal Lisowicia bojani was named in his honour in 2019.

== Life and work ==
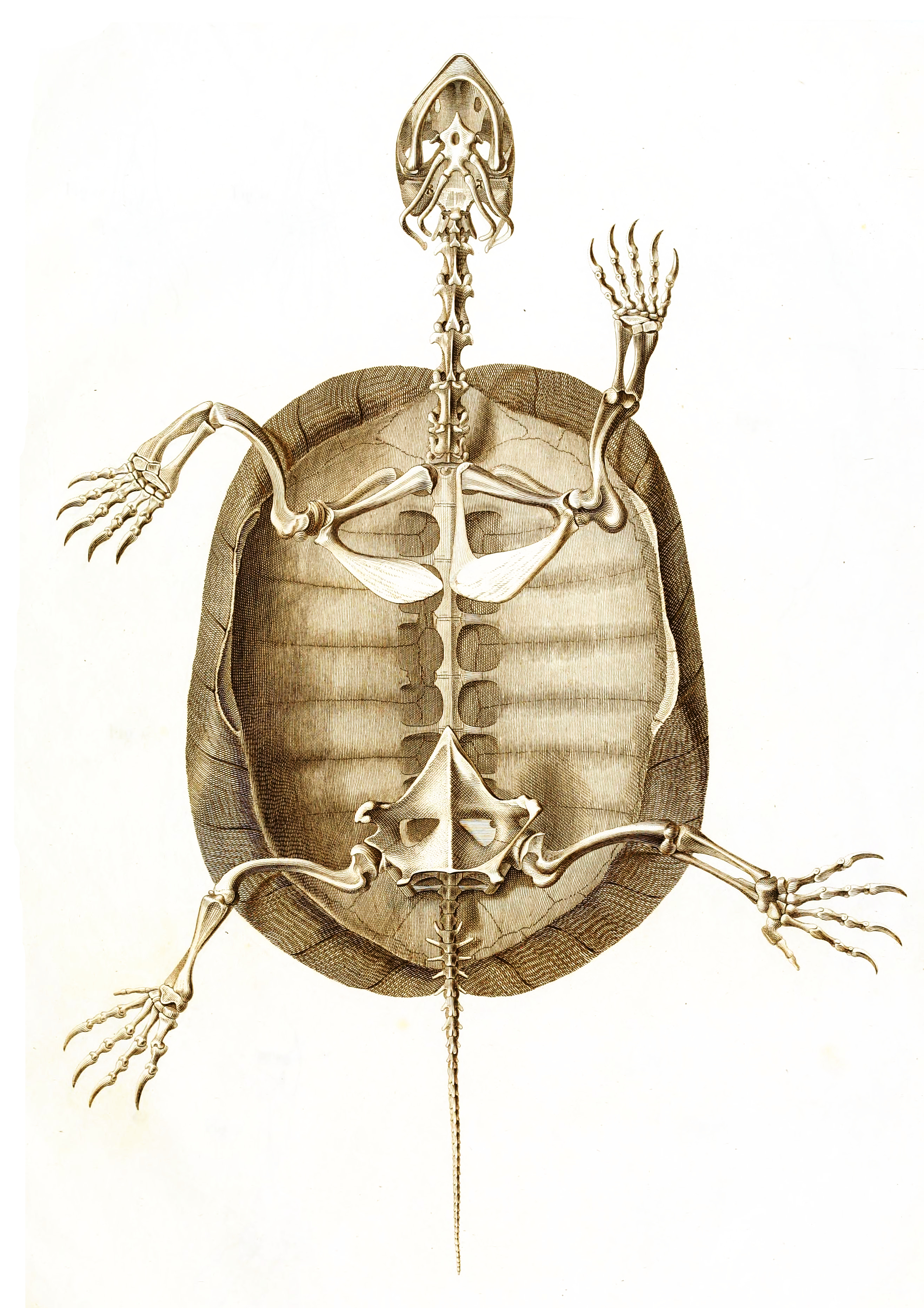
An illustration of the anatomy of Emys engraved by Friedrich Lehmann based on drawings made by Bojanus

Bojanus was born at Bouxwiller in Alsace, to Johann Jakob Bojanus (1740–1820) and Marie Eleonore Magdalene Kromayer. His younger sister Louise Friederike (1789–1880) married into the influential Merck family of Darmstadt. The family of Lutherans fled along with to Darmstadt during the French invasion of Alsace in 1789. He finished his secondary education in Darmstadt and studied medicine at the University of Jena (Dr. med., 1797). In 1804 he was appointed professor of veterinary medicine at the University of Vilnius, a post which he could assume only in 1806. In 1812 he fled to St Petersburg when Vilnius was invaded by Napoleon's army and returned only in 1814. He began to teach comparative anatomy from 1814. In 1822 he was appointed rector of the university. Two years later, on medical advice, he returned to Darmstadt, where he died on 2 April 1827, a year after the death of his wife who took care of his medical needs.

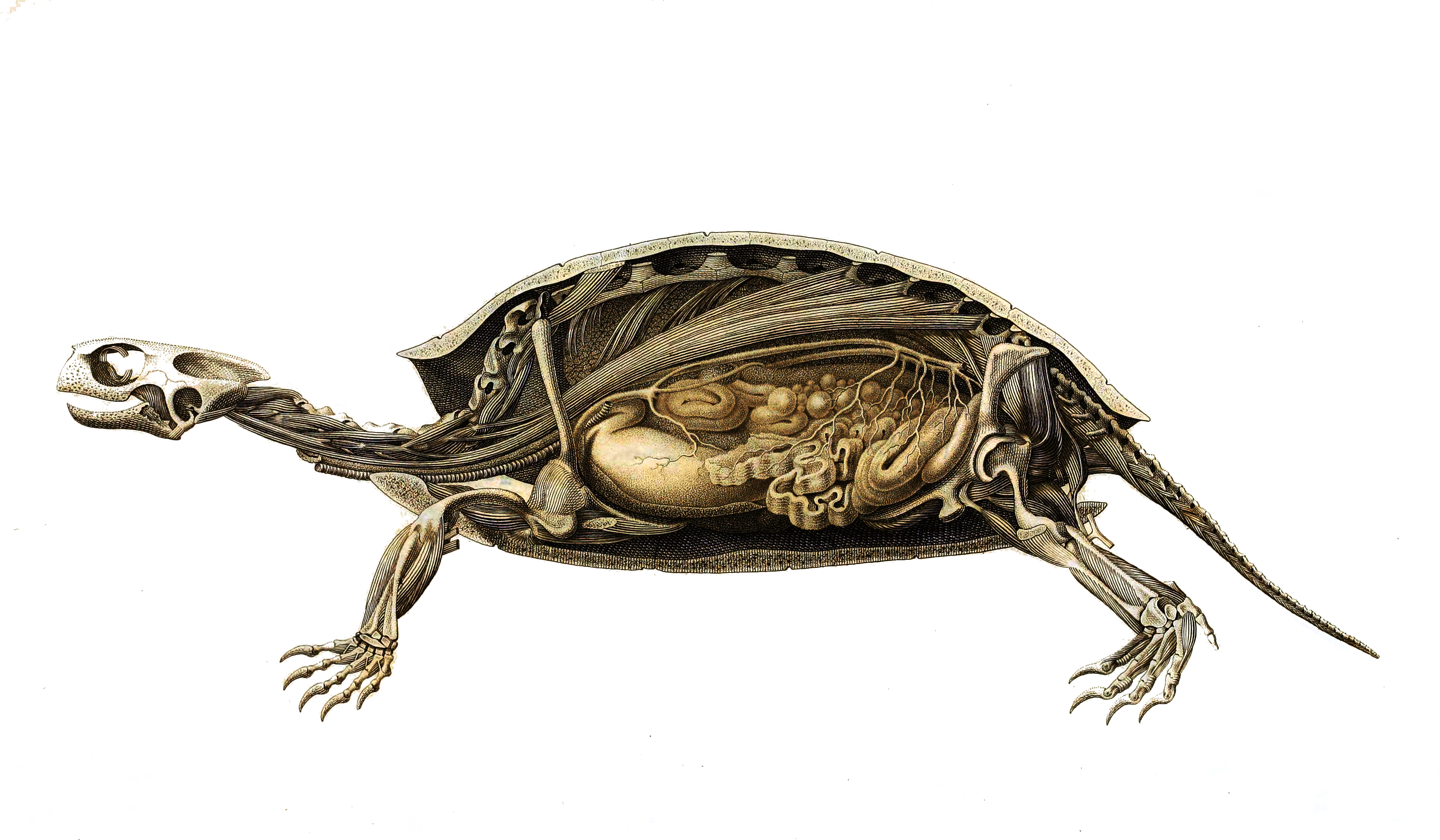
Anatomy of Emys

Bojanus produced 70 works on anatomy and veterinary medicine with the most influential work being an illustrated book on the anatomy of turtles, Anatome Testudinis Europaeae (1819, 1821). This had 50 plates, illustrated on his own, on the anatomy of the European pond turtle Emys orbicularis based on dissections of at least 500 turtles according to his student and biographer Adam Ferdynand Adamowicz (1802–1881). He initially considered dedicating the book to Georges Cuvier but decided not to later, possibly due to the troubles he had faced from the French and due to his allegiance to Tsarist Russia. He printed 80 copies at a cost of 5000 rubles (about two years of his wages worth) which he paid for on his own, leading to financial difficulties. His student Adamowicz later became a veterinary professor at Vilnius. Other significant students included Karol Muyschel (1799–1843) and Fortunat Jurewicz (1801–1826). He made several discoveries, including a glandular organ in bivalve molluscs that is now known as the organ of Bojanus. He noted cercaria inside snails in 1818 and considered them as related to liver flukes but did not know about the life cycle. He described the auroch species (Bos primigenius) and the steppe wisent (Bison priscus) providing distinction between them.

Bojanus married Wilhelmine Roose (1777–1826) in Vienna in 1803 and had no children of his own but had a stepdaughter Amelie (1819–1893). In 1814 he was elected corresponding member of the Imperial Academy of Sciences in St.Petersburg; in 1818 he became a member of the Imperial Leopold-Caroline Academy of Natural Sciences then in Bonn, and in 1821 was a foreign member of the Royal Swedish Academy of Sciences.
