= Murboden =

Breed of cattle

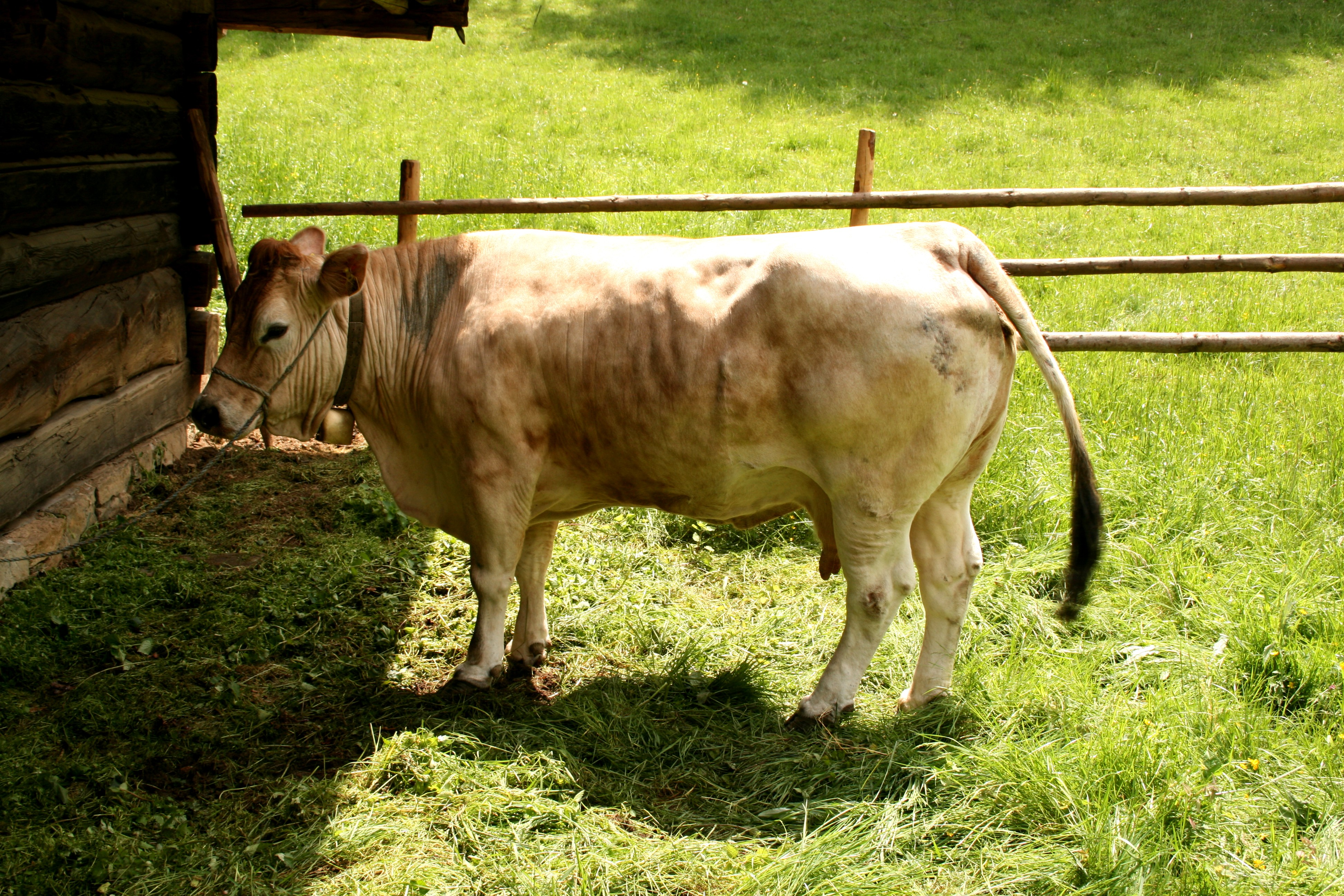
A Murboden bull

Murboden Cattle are bred primarily in Carinthia, Styria and Lower Austria in Austria, and in the bordering Slovenia. They are a mountain breed used as beef and milk producers, as well as being draught animals. Hair colour varies from yellowish to light red or grey, with deeper red areas around the horns, eyes, and along the nose. In Slovenia the breed is called Pomurska, and some small purebred herds have survived.

The breed is a mix of older local mountain breeds, including Murztal Cattle, living in the Mur Valley, Ennstal Mountain Pieds and Carinthian Blondvieh. Breeding for a uniform type began in the early 19th century and a herdbook was established in 1869.

Cows stand 130 to 140 cm and weigh from 700 to 800 kg; bulls are 140 and 150 cm and weigh 1,200 kg.

After World War II the population decreased greatly and there was crossing with other breeds. Only at the beginning of the 1980s were Murboden cattle increasingly bred again, with the Austrian government running a conservation program.
