= Grotta del Genovese =

Cave in Sicily, Italy

Grotte du Genovese
- Genovese Cave
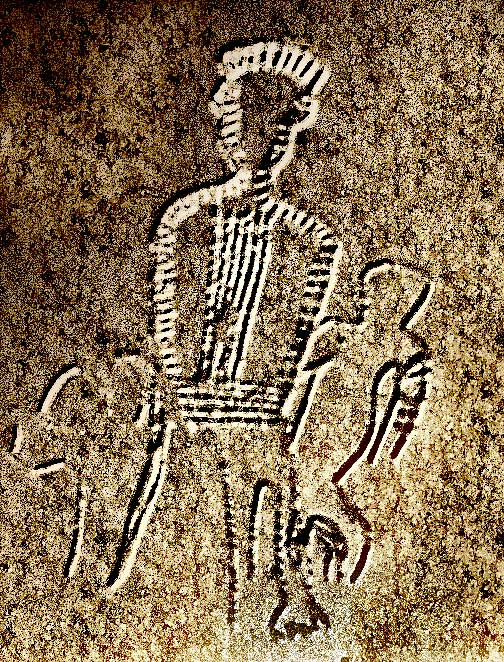
- Interactive map of Grotte du Genovese
- Location: Levanzo, Italy
- Coordinates: 38°00′06.08″N 12°19′17.85″E
- Discovery: 1949

The Grotta del Genovese (in English: Genovese Cave) is located on the island of Levanzo, in the Aegadian Islands, northwest of Sicily. The cave was discovered in 1949.

== History ==
The cave, which opens into the limestone rocks that form the island, preserves significant documentation of Sicilian prehistory, particularly from the Upper Paleolithic period. It provides images of Quaternary animals such as the red deer, aurochs, and hydrontin, as well as some human figures with bird-head masks and headdresses similar to those found in the Addaura caves.

In addition to these paintings, there are numerous painted figures, which are more recent. These are colored in red and black and depict male and female human figures as well as mammals and fish, including tuna, which remain significant in the life and culture of the modern Aegadian Islands. The cave is open to visitors, and admission is charged.

== Paintings ==
The main figure, which dominates over the animals, is that of a man wearing what appears to be a stitched jacket. He dons a headdress of a particular elongated and convex shape. Bracelets can be seen on his arms. Beside him are two other figures, one with a bird head or mask, possibly in a dancing position, and the other in motion, with a hairstyle similar to the central figure. It is not yet known whether this depicts a ritual dance or a prayer before the hunt.

The cave was inhabited by humans during a period between 10,000 and 6,000 years BCE.

Thanks to stratigraphic analysis, it was possible to conduct one of the very few carbon-14 datings of Sicilian prehistory, which indicates an age of 9230 BCE (Advanced Epigravettian). The presence of a significant limestone fragment with an engraved bovid, in a style very similar to the mural representations, within the stratigraphic sequence, allowed for this absolute dating.
