= Großlobming =

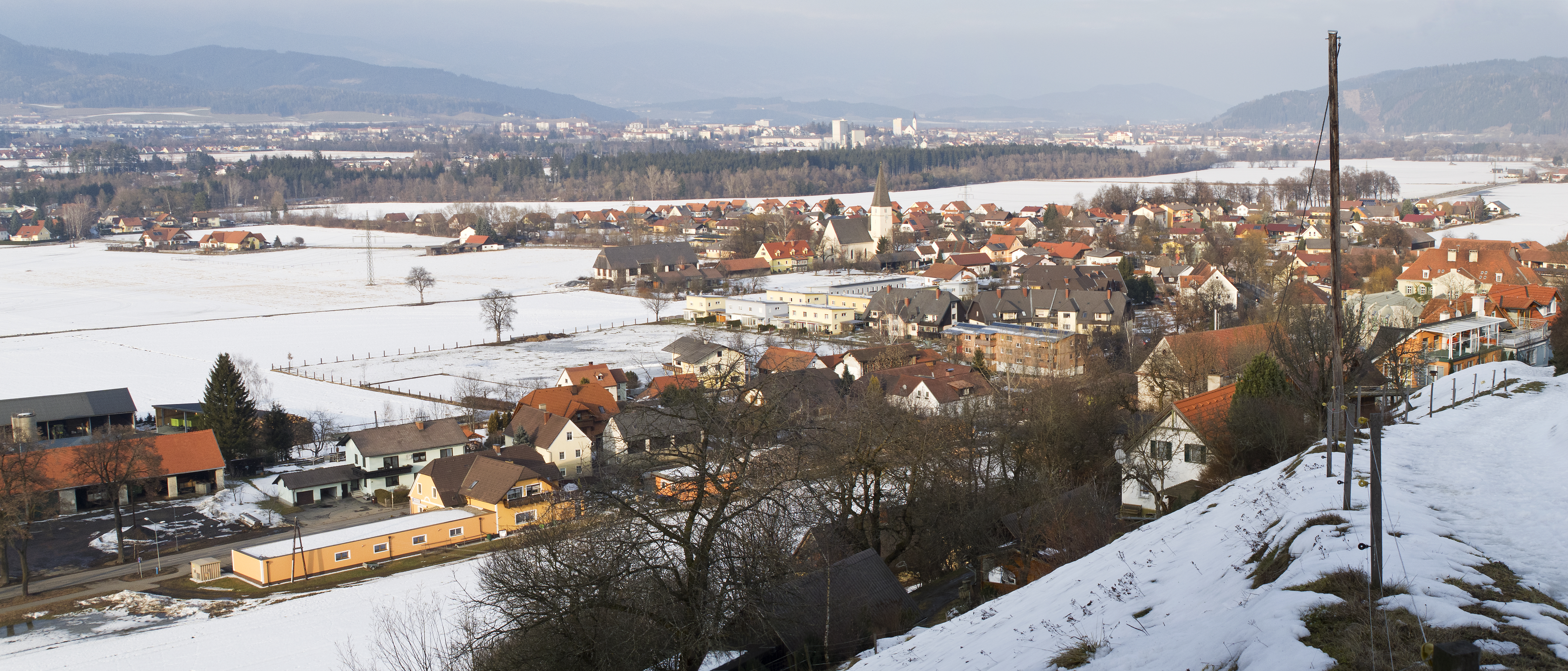
- View of Großlobming

- Coat of arms

- Location within Austria
- Coordinates: 47°10′N 14°48′E
- Country: Austria
- State: Styria
- District: Murtal

Government
  - Mayor: Heribert Bogensperger (ÖVP)

Area
  - Total: 7.39 km^{2} (2.85 sq mi)
- Elevation: 614 m (2,014 ft)

Population (1 January 2016)
  - Total: 1,215
  - Density: 164/km^{2} (426/sq mi)
- Time zone: UTC+1 (CET)
  - Summer (DST): UTC+2 (CEST)
- Postal code: 8734
- Area code: 03512
- Vehicle registration: KF
- Website: www.grosslobming.at

Großlobming is a municipality in the district of Murtal in Styria, Austria. It is located on the banks of the river Mur.
