= Carinthian Blondvieh =

Breed of cattle

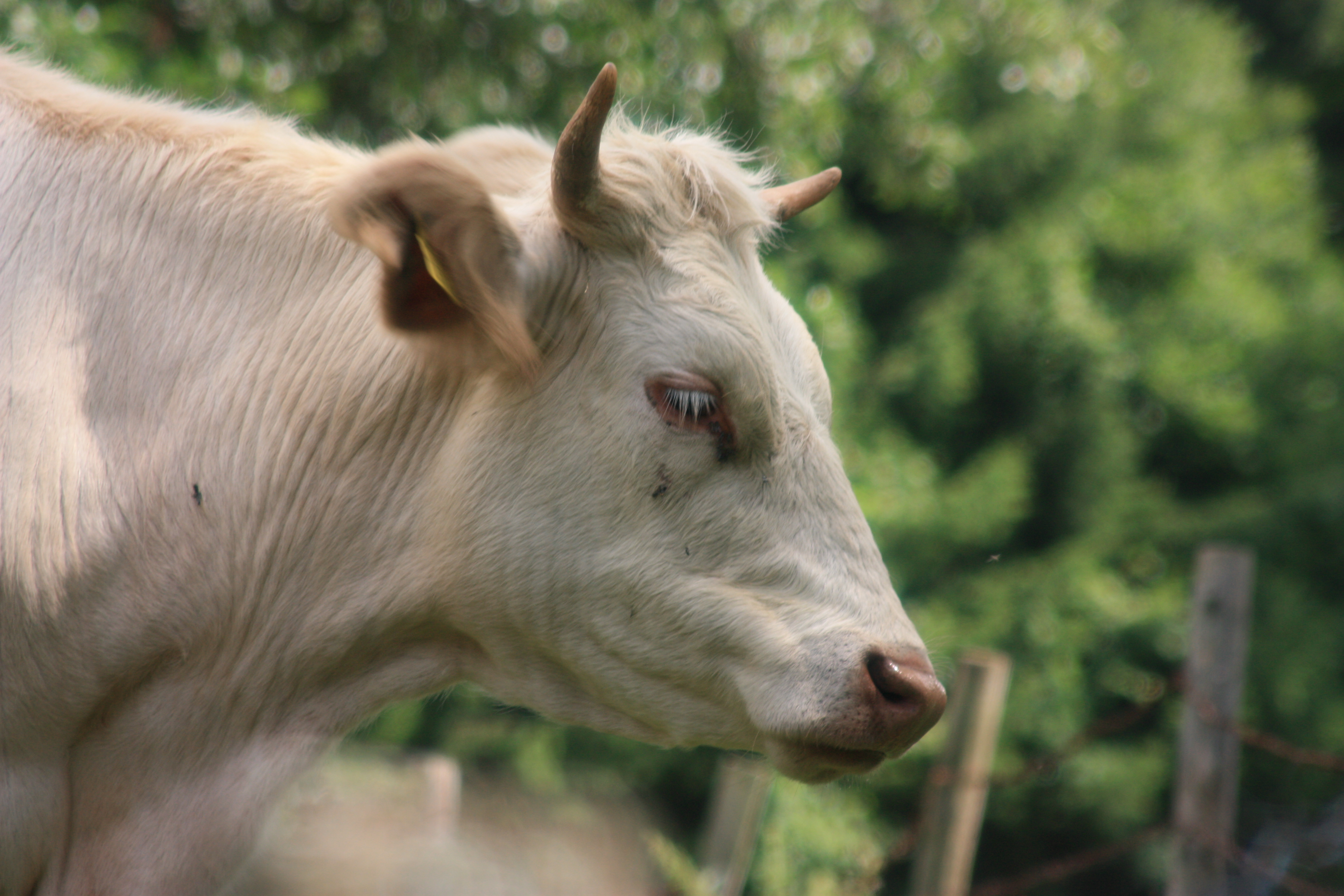
Carinthian Blondvieh

Carinthian Blondvieh (German: Kärntner Blondvieh) is an old cattle breed that is native to Carinthia in Austria.

== Characteristics ==
Carinthian Blondvieh is typically uniformly white or pale yellow, with a pale mouth, horns, and hooves. Cows weigh 500 kg (1,100 lb) to 600 kg (1,300 lb), bulls 800 kg (1,800 lb) to 850 kg (1,870 lb). Blondviehs were once bred to be triple purpose cattle, a draft animal as well as a milk and beef producer.

== History ==
The breed's date of origin is unknown. Dr. Adolf Gstirner sees the Blondvieh as descendant of Slovene cattle that came to Carinthia during the early medieval Slavic settlement of the Eastern Alps. They were crossed with Franconian Gelbvieh to develop a new breed which was officially formed by 1890. First recorded in the Carinthian lordship of Eberstein, breeding became common in the Lavanttal and the area around Friesach. A Carinthian Blondvieh breeding association was established in 1924.

== Population ==
Carinthian Blondvieh became a rare breed in the late 20th century, when the population decreased sharply to about 100 cattle by 1990. Since then, several efforts have been made for the recovery of stocks:

2002: 421 cows – 42 bulls

2005: 524 cows – 40 bulls – 323 calves

2015: 1,118 cows – 81 bulls – 611 calves

== Literature ==
- Prof. Dr. A. Gstirner: Entstehung der steirischen Rinderrassen
- Dr. Johann Burger: Die Lavanttaler Hornviehrasse
- Dr. H. Sommeregger: Beitrag zur Geschichte der Kärntner Blondviehzucht, 1944
