= Levanzo =

Levanzo Lèvanzu (Sicilian)
- Island
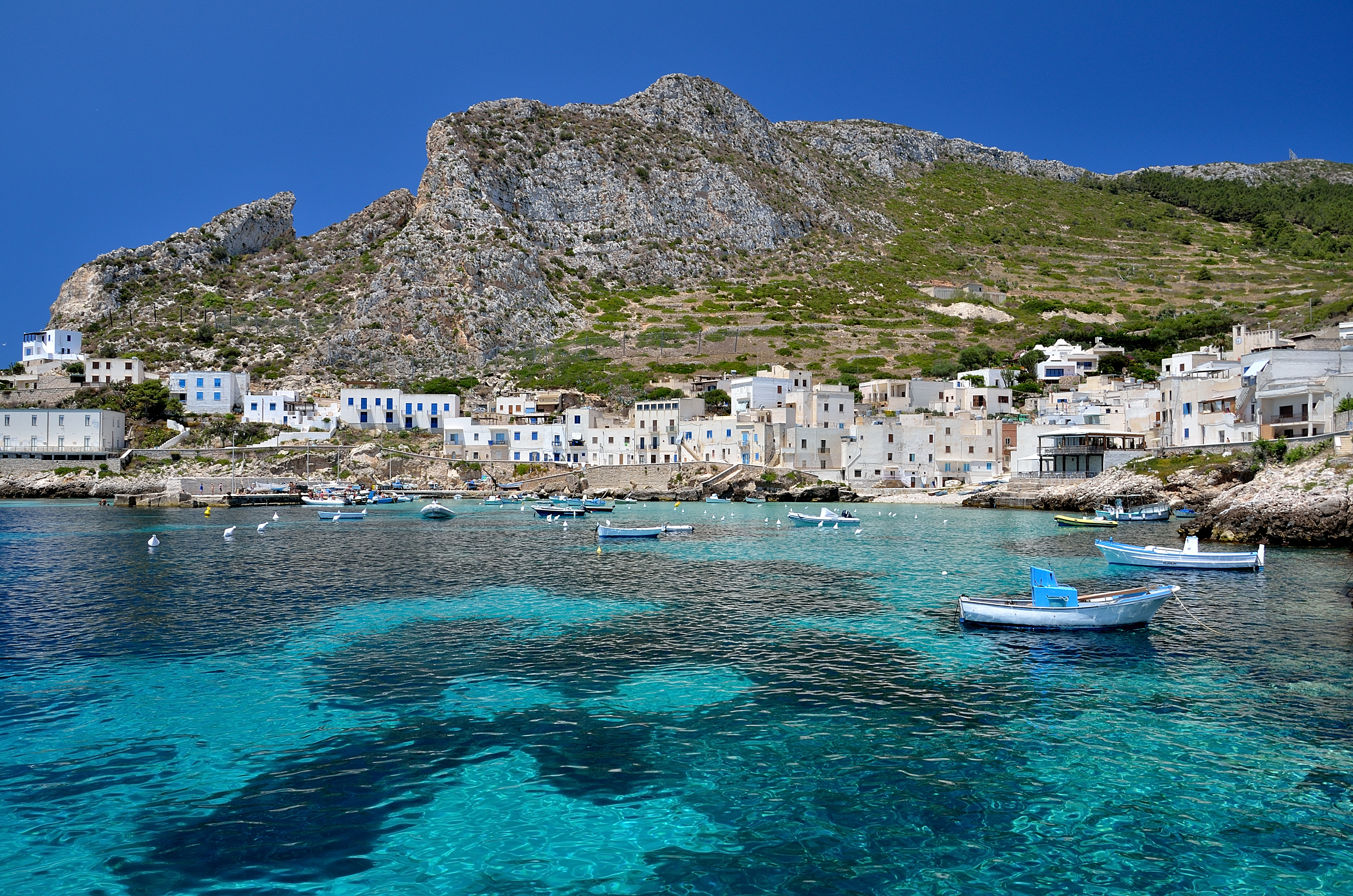
- Port of Levanzo
- Interactive map of Levanzo
- Location in Italy
- Coordinates: 38°00′N 12°20′E
- Country: Italy
- Province: Trapani
- Comune: Favignana

Area
  - Total: 5.82 km^{2} (2.25 sq mi)
- Elevation: 278 m (912 ft)

Population
  - Total: 450
  - Density: 77/km^{2} (200/sq mi)

Levanzo (Italian: [ˈlɛːvantso]; Sicilian: Lèvanzu [ˈlɛːvandzʊ]) is the smallest of the three main Aegadian Islands in the Mediterranean Sea west of Sicily, Italy. It forms a part of the municipality (comune) of Favignana in the Province of Trapani.

== Geography ==
Levanzo has an area of 5.82 square kilometres (2.25 sq mi). The highest point is Pizzo Monaco with a height of 278 metres (912 feet). The island has an estimated 450 inhabitants, who are concentrated around a tiny port, that gives little shelter from storms.

The ancient name of the island was "Phorbantia" which is a sort of plant that commonly grows there.

Levanzo is famous for the "Grotta del Genovese" with Neolithic cave paintings and Palaeolithic graffiti.

Furthermore, in the water of Cala Minnola, on the eastern side of the island of Levanzo, lies one of the most important Sicilian underwater archaeological sites: a Roman cargo ship, loaded with wine amphoras, at 27 meters deep.

== See also ==
- List of islands of Italy
