= Lavanttal Alps =

Austrian section of the Alps

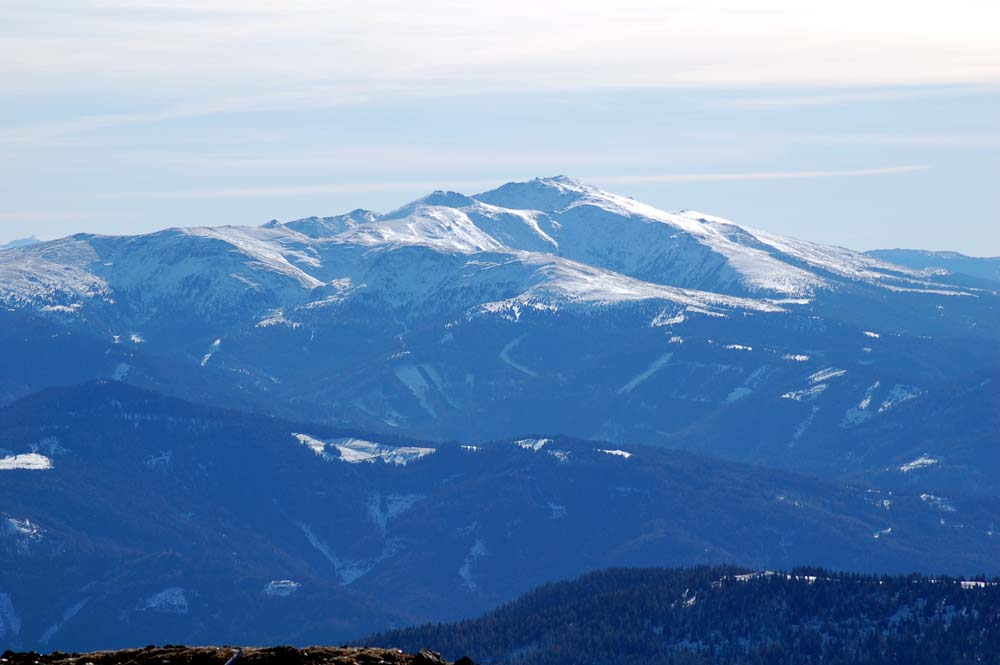
- Seetal Alps with Mt. Zirbitzkogel

Highest point
- Peak: Zirbitzkogel
- Elevation: 2,396 m (7,861 ft)
- Coordinates: 47°3′0″N 14°34′0″E

Geography
- Countries: Austria and Slovenia
- States: Styria and Carinthia
- Range coordinates: 47°4′N 14°57′E
- Parent range: Central Eastern Alps; Carinthian-Styrian Alps (Noric Alps)

The Lavanttal Alps (German: Lavanttaler Alpen, Slovene: Labotniške Alpe) are part of the Central Eastern Alps in Austria and Slovenia, between the river Mur in the north and the Drava in the south.

The mountains are named after the central valley of Lavanttal and the Lavant River which runs in their midst. Historically they were also viewed, along with the neighbouring Gurktal Alps range, as part of the larger "Noric Alps", but that grouping had no geological basis.

== Subdivision ==
The main ranges of the Lavanttal Alps are:

- Seetal Alps, stretching along the Mur River from Scheifling to Zeltweg in Styria, including the highest peak, Mt. Zirbitzkogel, 2,396 m (7,861 ft)
- Saualpe, the lower westernmost range in Carinthia, between Klippitztörl Pass in the north and the Drava in the south
- Packalpe and Stubalpe, stretching from Obdach Saddle in the west and Gaberl Pass in the north to the Packsattel in the south, including Mt. Ameringkogel, 2,187 m (7,175 ft)
- Koralpe, the southern continuation along the Styrian-Carinthian border
- The Kozjak Mountains (also Possruck Mountains), along the border of Austria with Slovenia, from Radl Pass in the west down to the Slovene Hills and the Drava River.
- Gleinalpe, stretching from the Mur near Zeltweg in the northeast and Gaberl Pass in the southwest down to the Graz Basin, crossed by the Gleinalm Tunnel.
