= Obdach =

- Municipality
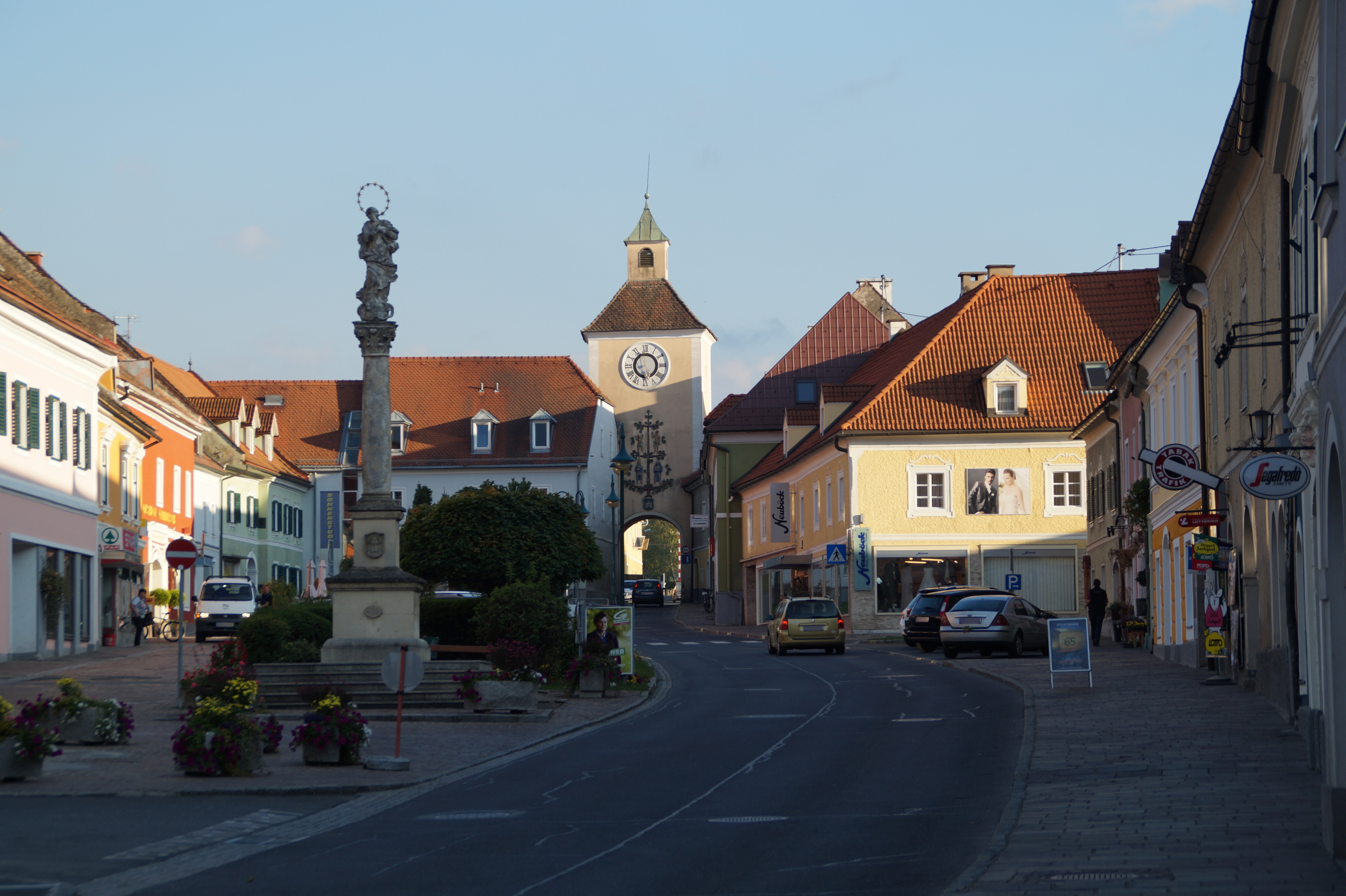
- Centre of Obdach

- Coat of arms

- Location within Austria
- Coordinates: 47°04′05″N 14°41′42″E
- Country: Austria
- State: Styria
- District: Murtal

Government
  - Mayor: Peter Bacher (ÖVP)

Area
  - Total: 159.26 km^{2} (61.49 sq mi)
- Elevation: 877 m (2,877 ft)

Population (2018-01-01)
  - Total: 3,810
  - Density: 23.9/km^{2} (62.0/sq mi)
- Time zone: UTC+1 (CET)
  - Summer (DST): UTC+2 (CEST)
- Postal code: 8742
- Area code: 03578
- Vehicle registration: JU
- Website: www.obdach. steiermark.at

Obdach (German: [ˈɔbˌdax]) is a municipality in the district of Murtal in Styria, Austria.

== Geography ==
The municipality covers an area of 159.24 km² and is located in the valley of the Granitzenbach north of the Obdach Saddle the transition from the Upper Murtal to the Lavanttal. The municipal area extends from the valley to the west to the Seetal Alps with the highest peak, the Zirbitzkogel (2396 m).

=== Neighbourhoods and outlying communities ===
The municipal area includes the following 18 villages (Population 01-01-2021):

- Amering (418)
- Bärnthal (20)
- Granitzen (149)
- Großprethal (110)
- Kathal in Obdachegg (123)
- Katschwald (69)
- Kienberg (95)
- Kleinprethal (70)
- Lavantegg (184)
- Mönchegg (171)
- Obdach (1529)
- Obdachegg (240)
- Rötsch (198)
- Sankt Anna-Feriensiedlung (26)
- Sankt Georgen in Obdachegg (71)
- Warbach (134)
- Winterleiten (124)
- Zanitzen (16)

The municipality consists of six cadastral municipalities (area as of 2015):

- Granitzen (3.764,53 ha)
- Kienberg (2.043,69 ha)
- Lavantegg (4.713,68 ha)
- Obdach (514,87 ha)
- Obdachegg (2.091,64 ha)
- Prethal (2780,01 ha)

The village is located in the judicial district of Judenburg.

== History ==
Obdach was first mentioned in a document in 1190 as "Obdah". The name goes back to the Old High German obadah (protective roof). It is likely that there was a refreshment stop on the land lot for travelers on their way to Carinthia. In 1324 Obdach was elevated to a market and also had a high court. Obdach was a regionally important trading center on the road over the Obdach Saddle.

- The political municipality of Obdach was established in 1849/50.
- On 1 January 1970 the municipality of Granitzen was united with the market town of Obdach.
- Since 2015 it has been merged with the former municipalities of Amering, Sankt Anna am Lavantegg and Sankt Wolfgang-Kienberg as part of the Styria municipal structural reform.

=== Population development ===
97.6% of the population held Austrian citizenship. The Roman Catholic Church accounted for 91.3 % of the population, the Protestant Church for 1.1 % and Islam for 1.8 %, and 4.7 % had no religious affiliation (as of 2001).

The municipality experienced population growth in the second half of the 20th century. The decrease in the number of inhabitants since 2000 affects especially the youth. The number of people under fifteen years old decreased by 40 percent from 2001 to 2019, and at the same time the percentage of people over 65 years old grew by 34 percent.

== Culture and sights ==
- Catholic parish church Obdach St. Aegydius
- Hospital church: owned by the burghers, from the 1st half of the 15th century.
- Square Tower

Natural sights

- Granitzenbach, which is a natural monument in its upper reaches

== Economy and infrastructure ==
According to the 2001 workplace census, there were 99 workplaces with 873 employees in the municipality, as well as 519 out-commuters and 463 in-commuters. There were 91 agricultural and forestry holdings (32 of which were full-time), which together farmed 3,114 ha (1999).

The most important industrial enterprise is the ALKO machine factory (mainly lawn mowers) with about 250 employees.

=== Traffic ===
Traffic access is provided by the Obdacher Straße B 78, which connects the Carinthian Lavanttal with the Murtal. In Obdach is a station of the Lavanttalbahn. Passenger service between Zeltweg and Bad St. Leonhard was discontinued in 2010.

=== Education ===
In Obdach there is a kindergarten, an elementary school and a new secondary school.

== Politics ==
The municipal council has 21 members.

- With the 2015 municipal elections in Styria, the municipal council had the following distribution: 14 ÖVP, 6 SPÖ and 1 FPÖ.
- With the municipal elections in Styria 2020, the municipal council has the following distribution: 14 ÖVP and 7 SPÖ.

=== Mayor ===
- until 2014 Peter Köstenberger (ÖVP)
- since 2015 Peter Bacher (ÖVP)

=== Partner municipalities ===
- Kötz in Bavaria has been Obdach's partner community since 1990.

=== Coat of arms ===

Due to the merging of municipalities, the coat of arms lost its official validity on 1 January 2015. The re-award took effect on 1 January 2016.

The new blazon (coat of arms description) reads:

"In blue shield over green shield base between two silver towers with three battlements each and a black openwork round arched window on the ground floor set a silver ashlar, two-story wall with openwork round gate with raised portcullis and two black openwork high rectangular windows on each floor; above the gate a tower with three black pierced round arched windows and golden, below wavy closed hood together with black pierced round arched window, pommel and pennant flying off to the left."

== Personalities ==
=== Honorary citizen of the municipality ===
- 1881: Johann Freiherr von Vernier-Rougemont (District Governor of Judenburg 1876–1883)
- 1928: ÖR Josef Grogger (Mayor of Obdach 1917–1919)
- 1936: Eduard Schützenauer (physician)
- 1973: Wolfgang Köle (1919–2018), (physician)
- 1973: Heinrich Köle (1920–2015), (physician)
- 1974: Johann Bammer (1922–2017), (provincial councilor)
- 1974: Alois Kober (1908–1996), (entrepreneur)
- 1982: Ernst Schwartz
- 1984: ÖR Franz Zellnig (Mayor of Obdach 1970–1984)
- 1986: Hans Gross (1930–1992), (Deputy Governor of the Province of Obdach)
- 1998: Herbert Kober (*1933), (entrepreneur)
- 1998: Kurt Kober (entrepreneur)
- 1998: Willy Kober (entrepreneur)

=== Sons and daughters of the community ===
- Rudolf Falb, 1838–1903 (researcher)
- Viktorin Weyer, 1866–1939 (Benedictine abbot of Sankt Lambrecht)
- Ernest Kaltenegger, born 1949 (politician of the KPÖ)
- Peter Rieser, born 1950 (politician of the ÖVP)

== Trivia ==
Until 2014, Obdach was the municipality with the highest "municipal office density": in addition to the Obdach office building, the municipal offices of Sankt Anna am Lavantegg and Sankt Wolfgang-Kienberg were also located on properties in the cadastral municipality of Obdach.

== Literature ==
- Gernot Fournier, Reiner Puschnig: Das Obdacherland und seine Geschichte (English: The Obdach region and its history). Obdach 1990.
