= River Lavant =

The River Lavant may refer to:

- The Lavant (river) a tributary of the Drava in Austria
- The River Lavant, West Sussex in the United Kingdom
