= Noric =

Noric may refer to:

- Noricum, an ancient region
- Noric Alps
- Noric language
- Noric race
- Noric steel
- the Taurisci, also called Norici
