= Lavanttal =

Valley in the Austrian Alps

Coordinates: 46°50′00″N 14°50′30″E

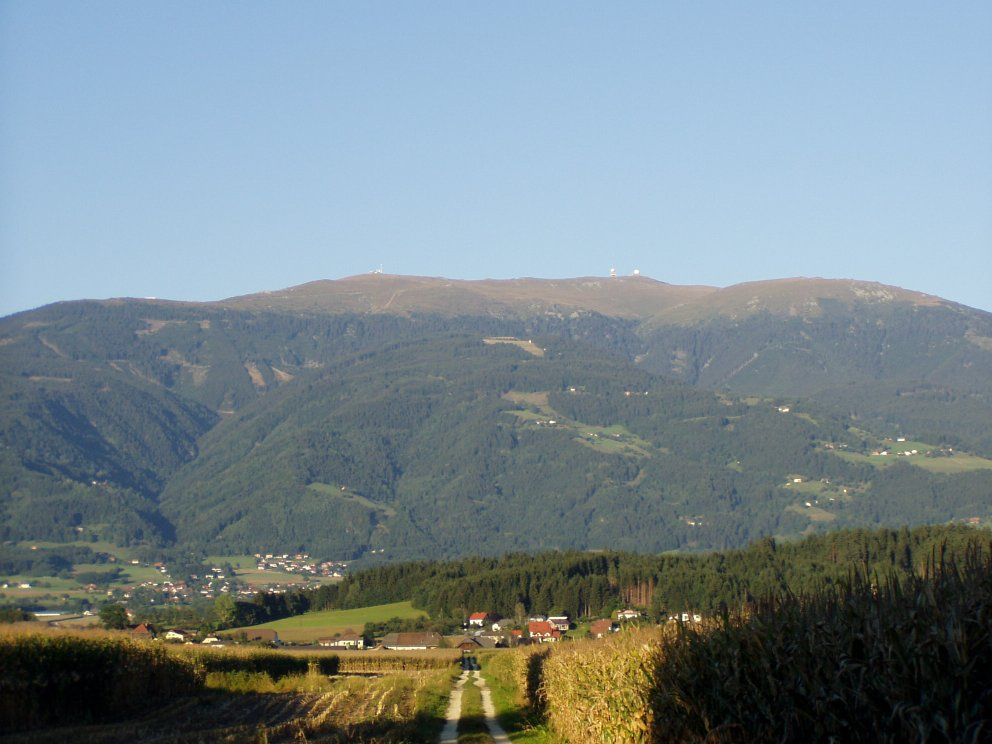
Koralpe

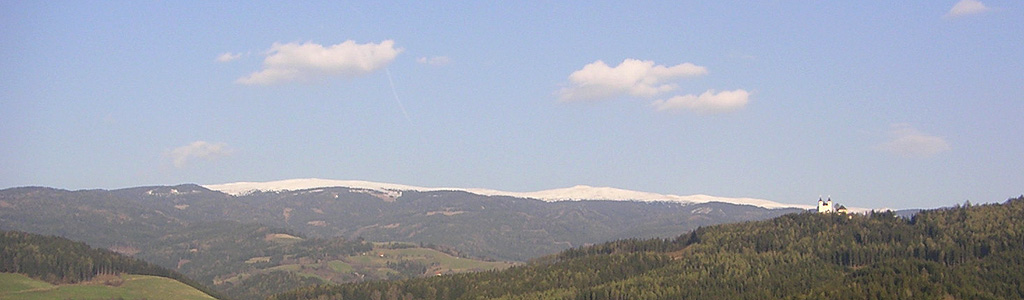
Saualpe

The Lavanttal ('Lavant Valley', German pronunciation: [ˈlavantˌtaːl], Slovene: Labotska dolina or Laboška dolina; Southern Bavarian: Lovnthol) lies in the Lavanttal Alps in southern Austria in the eastern part of the state of Carinthia. It covers just under 1,000 km^{2} (390 sq mi). Approximately 60,000 people live in the area.

== Geography ==
The Lavant River flows through the valley, having its source on the Zirbitzkogel in Styria and discharging into the Drau near Lavamünd. It is divided into the Upper Lavant Valley (German: Oberes Lavanttal), which lies north of the Twimberger Graben, and the Lower Lavant Valley (German: Unteres Lavanttal), which is further south. The lower, broader valley nestles between the mountains of the Koralpe and Saualpe. The Upper Lavant Valley lies between the Packalpe and the Seetal Alps.

The Lavant Valley forms the greater part of the administrative district of Wolfsberg.

== Name ==
The valley derives its name from the Lavant River, which flows through it for 64 km (40 mi) from north to south. It has its source in the border region between Styria and Carinthia, on the Styrian mountain of Zirbitzkogel. Near Lavamünd, in the southernmost part of the Lavant Valley, the Lavant empties into the Drau.

== Climate ==
The climate of the Lavant Valley is relatively dry, with around 800 mm (31 in) of precipitation annually. The valley often suffers from temperature inversion during the winter half year, which brings fog and high levels of pollution in the valley bottom. The land at medium elevations around 800 m (2,600 ft) to 1,000 m (3,300 ft) are thus climatically preferred; they are sunnier and warmer than the terrain of the valley floor.

== Agriculture ==
The growing of maize and the rearing of pigs and chickens are the main forms of agriculture in the valley. In the Lower Lavant Valley and the adjacent Granitz Valley there are many orchards, especially of apples used to make cider and schnapps products. Here there are also several meadow orchards. Another speciality is asparagus. The majority of the Carinthian vineyards, only around 20 ha (49 acres), are located in the Lavant Valley.

== Art and culture ==
Well-known artistic personalities such as Christine Lavant, Switbert Lobisser, and Gerhart Ellert have done much to promote the culture of the valley. There are regular special exhibitions in the Benedictine monastery of St. Paul, which enhance the extensive art collections.

== Literature ==
- Bäk, Richard: "Geologie und Landschaftsbild des Kärntner Lavanttales", in: Schatzhaus Kärntens: Landesausstellung St. Paul 1991, 900 Jahre Benediktinerstift, Klagenfurt, 1991, Vol. 2, pp. 309 ff., ISBN 3-85378-377-5
- Schober, Eduard: Das Lavanttal, Wolfsberg, 1990
- Thelian, Werner und Richter, Nicole: Lust auf Lavanttal, Klagenfurt, 2007, ISBN 978-3-9502341-0-7
