= Sankt Anna =

Sankt Anna may refer to:

- Sankt Anna am Aigen, a municipality in the district of Südoststeiermark in Styria, Austria
- Sankt Anna am Lavantegg, a former municipality in the district of Murtal in Styria, Austria
