= Seetal Alps =

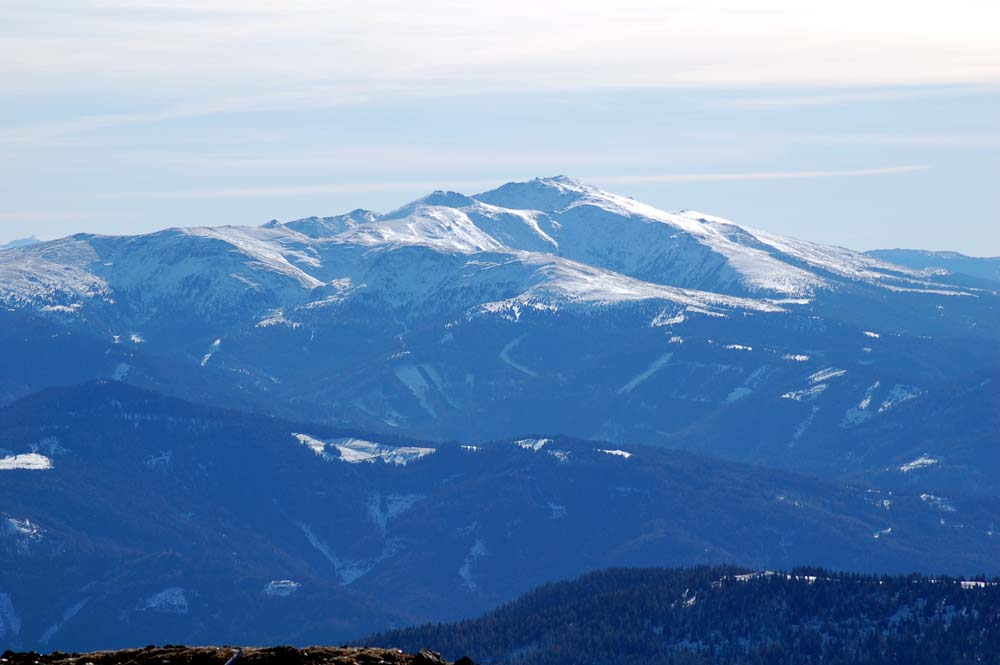
- The Seetal Alps and the Zirbitzkogel from the northwest (Lachtal)

Highest point
- Peak: Zirbitzkogel
- Elevation: 2,396 m above sea level (AA)

Dimensions
- Length: 26 km (16 mi)

Geography
- Location within Alps
- State(s): Styria and Carinthia, Austria
- Range coordinates: 47°04′15″N 14°33′30″E
- Parent range: Lavanttal Alps

The Seetal Alps (German: Seetaler Alpen) are a mountain range in the Lavanttal or Noric Alps in Austria south of the River Mur between Scheifling and Zeltweg. Their highest peak is the Zirbitzkogel (2,396 m).

== Topography ==
The Seetal Alps are bounded to the north by the Mur valley, to the east by the Obdach Saddle, to the south by the Klippitztörl and to the west by the Neumarkt Saddle. The majority of the range lies within the Austrian state of Styria, only from the Klippitztörl does it extend into Carinthia. The most important summits, from north to south, are:

- Weißeck (1,743 m)
- Brandriegel (1,721 m)
- Hohe Ranach (1,981 m)
- Erslstand (2,124 m)
- Wenzelalpe (2,151 m)
- Kreiskogel (2,306 m) with the very difficult Lukas-Max klettersteig
- Scharfes Eck (2,364 m)
- Zirbitzkogel (2,396 m)
- Fuchskogel (2,214 m)
- Streitwiesenalm (called the Blutwiese locally) and the Judenburg Cross (1,764 m)
- Zöhrerkogel (1,874 m)
- Angerlkogel (1,774 m)
- Jägerstube (1,749 m)

On the Klippitztörl is a large ski area. There is also skiing near the Sabathy Hut and Tonner Hut.

The high mountain chain has several rugged rock formations that rise above the tree line.

The region is crossed by the Eisenwurzenweg (Austrian long-distance path 08). This reaches its highest point at the Zirbitzkogel.

== Tourism ==
The range is popular with climbers and walkers. In addition it has several ski areas on and to the north of the Klippitztörl.

The Seetaler Alpe military training area, run by the Austrian Bundesheer is on the northern slopes of the range and is accessible from Judenburg.

== Huts ==
- Winterleiten Hut (1,782 m) northeast of the Zirbitzkogel
- Alpengasthof Sabathy (1,620 m), at the eastern foot of the Zirbitzkogel
- Zirbitzkogel House (2,376 m), on the summit of the Zirbitzkogel
- Tonner Hut (1,600 m), halfway up the Zirbitzkogel from Mühlen and Zirbitzkogel
- Waldheim Hut (1,614 m), halfway up the Zirbitzkogel from Obdach
- St.Martin's Hut (1,710 m), near the Streitwiesenalm
- Klippitztörl Hut (1,644 m), on the Klippitztörl near the ski area
