= Burg Klingenstein =

Castle ruin in Austria

Klingenstein
- Salla, Salla/Klingenstein
- Maria Lankowitz
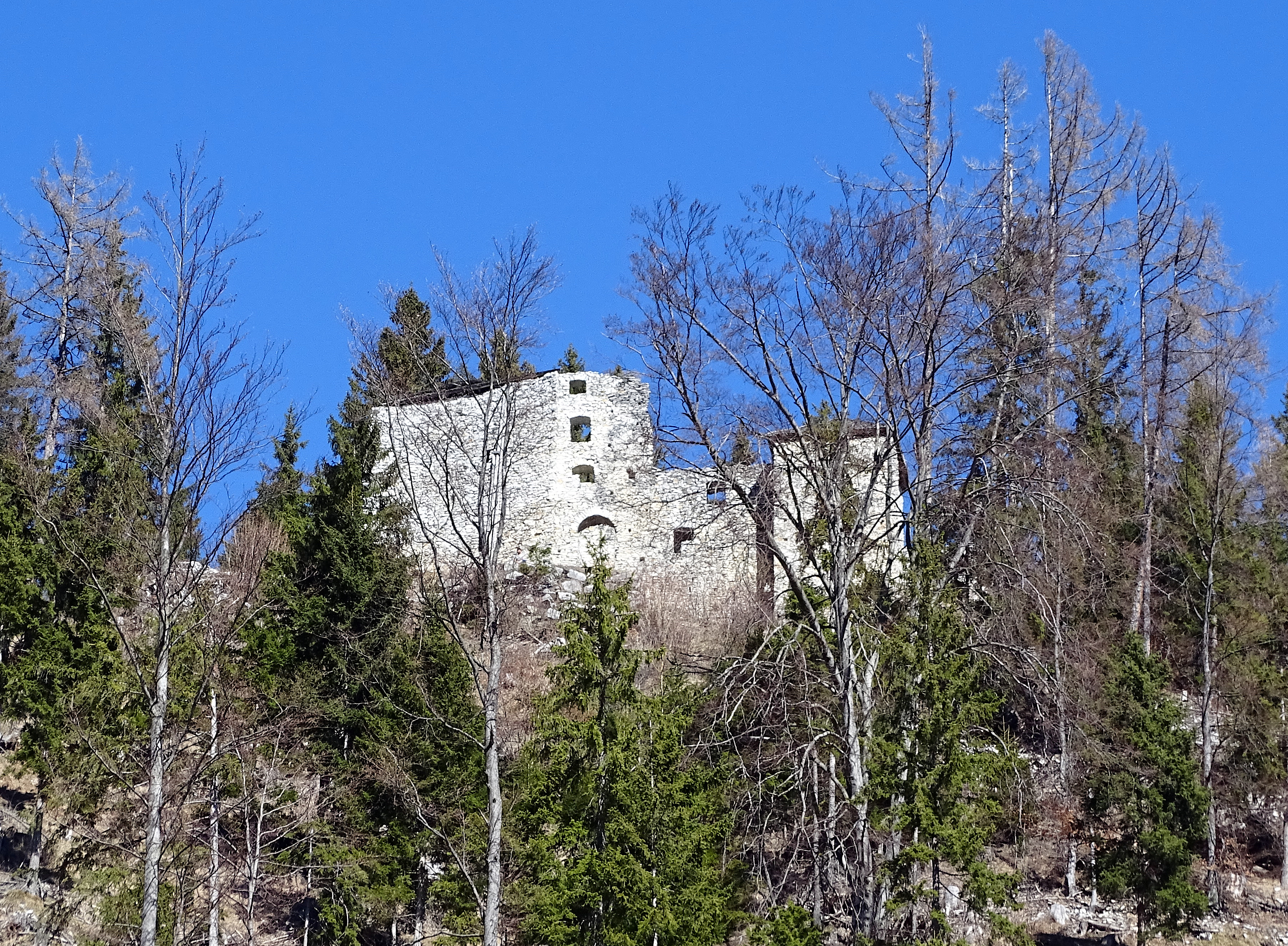
- View from the south of the castle hill with the ruins

Site information
- Type: hill castle
- Code: AT-6
- Condition: ruin

Location
- Coordinates: 47°6′22″N 14°57′39″E
- Height: 1,040 m (AA)

Site history
- Built: after 1420
- Materials: irregular quarry stone masonry made of marble

The ruins of Burg Klingenstein, also known as Burg Salla and in literature partly under the double name "Burg Klingenstein/Salla", are located west of the village of Salla in the market town of Maria Lankowitz in Western Styria. First named Klingenstein in 1834, the castle was built to protect the trade route from Voitsberg over the Gaberl to the upper Murtal. Its history can only be reconstructed incompletely due to a lack of written sources. Structural details, such as the masonry and the design of the embrasures, suggest that it was probably built in the second half of the 15th century, which is quite late compared to other Austrian castles. The Counts of Montfort, who ruled over the nearby village of Salla at the time, could have been the builders. From the 16th century at the latest, the castle was owned by the noble family Saurau and subsequently also by the Glojacher. The castle was probably destroyed by fire in the 16th century and never rebuilt. From 1982/1983, the ruins were rebuilt by the former mayor of the former municipality of Salla, although some of these rebuilds were new constructions and are controversial among researchers. Three archaeological excavations have also taken place to date, but these did not cover the entire castle area.

The castle was probably built in a construction phase using locally available marble and consists of the core castle and the fortification to the west of it. The original design of the castle and the functions of the individual buildings can only be guessed at due to the lack of scientific research to date.

== Location ==
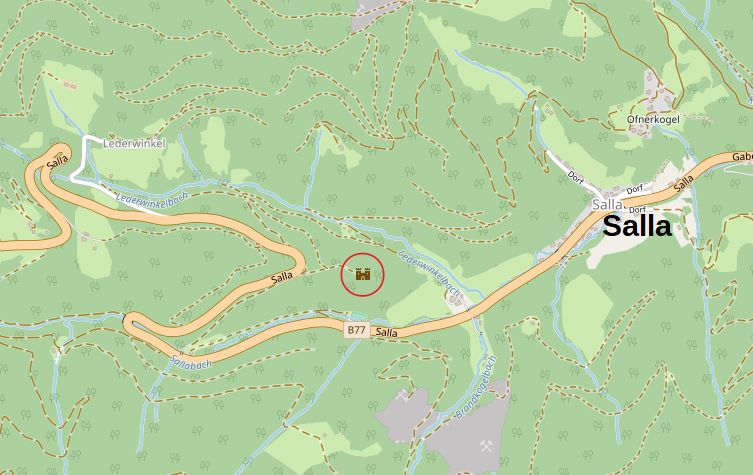
Lage der Burg Klingenstein

The castle is located in the north-western part of the market town of Maria Lankowitz, in the western part of the cadastral municipality of Salla. It lies around 900 meters west-southwest of the village of Salla on a narrow, wooded mountain ridge that slopes steeply to the north, east and south and is particularly rocky to the south. This is the last spur of a ridge branching off to the southeast and bending to the east from the Ofnerkogel, a peak in the Stubalpe mountain range, which rises around 150 meters above the Sallabach valley. It is bordered to the south by the Sallabach stream and to the north and east by the Lederwinkelbach stream.

In the past, access to the castle was probably from the west via a connection to the hinterland, which was protected by a ditch carved into the rock. Today's access road is a forest path that branches off in an easterly direction from Gaberl Straße (B 77) at the bend known as "Schlosskehre" or "Schlossreihe". (B 77) branches off. However, it is unclear whether the old trade route over the Gaberl had a similar course to the modern road in the Middle Ages and in the early modern era. However, there was probably another, more direct access route that led from the village of Salla over the northern slope of the castle hill. The historian Robert Baravalle located a path on the eastern slope, without going into more detail about its exact course. However, the location of the outworks to the west of the core castle suggests that the last part of the access was definitely from the west.

The Hofbauer farm mentioned in 1659 and the Gregorbauer farm, whose origins probably date back to the Middle Ages, could go back to former farm buildings of the castle.

== History ==
=== Unclear early history and construction period ===
There are hardly any sources, especially about the origins and early history of the castle, so that many historians have made various assumptions about this. The area in which the later castle was built came to the Eppensteins through a gift from Emperor Ottos III. The area was probably settled in the 11th or 12th century. The village of Salla probably emerged in the 12th century at the latest and was first mentioned in a document in 1213. Robert Baravalle assumed that the Eppensteins gave the area to their servants, the Lords of Wildon, and that it eventually passed from them to the Lords of Walsee. The historian Herwig Ebner, on the other hand, is of the opinion that the later castle site was part of a foundation of the Eppensteins to the St. Lambert's Abbey documented in 1103. Due to a lack of historical sources, it is not possible to prove whether either assumption is true.

Both Baravalle and Ebner saw the remains of an early castle complex from the 13th century in the parts of the wall to the west of the core castle. However, such a complex cannot be found in any historical source and could not be proven by archaeological excavations. The historian Anton Mell placed the construction of the castle in the Late Middle Ages and considered the Stadecks or the Counts of Montfort to be the most likely builders. He also considered construction by the Saurau, who owned the castle in the early modern period, to be possible, but rather unlikely. It is difficult to precisely date the construction of the castle due to a lack of sources. The surviving embrasures, which with two exceptions were clearly designed for firearms, provide a decisive indication of the construction period. In addition, there are no traces of any subsequent changes to the shape of the embrasures. As firearms did not appear in Central Europe until the 1420s and 1430s, it can be concluded that the castle was built at this time at the earliest, if not later, which would be a relatively late construction by Austrian standards. If the embrasures do indeed date from the construction period, then the Counts of Montfort are the most likely builders, as they inherited the area around Salla from the Stadeckers at the beginning of the 15th century. A Montfort land register from around 1420 lists possessions near Salla and also mentions that the counts had lower jurisdiction in this area, but does not mention any fortification or castle.

=== From the 15th century, decay and subsequent owners ===
The fortification was intended to secure the so-called Reisstraße, the passage over the Gaberl, and possibly also ore deposits discovered nearby, but was probably of little military value. It is not entirely clear who succeeded the Counts of Montfort in ownership of the castle. In 1961, Baravalle assumed a handover to the Gradner family, while in more recent literature, the Herberstein family are seen as the main successors. In the 16th century at the latest, however, the fortification came into the possession of the Lobminger line of the noble family Saurau. The historian Anton Mell assumed that Klingenstein was already in the possession of Erasmus von Saurau, who died in 1532. However, it can only be confirmed with certainty that Gilg von Saurau, the son of Erasmus, was the owner from 1550. The castle remained in the possession of the Saurau family for a long time, for example it is mentioned in documents of Ehrenreich von Saurau, who died in 1618, as Schloss Salla. Emerich von Saurau eventually bequeathed it to his sister Christine, who was married to Ehrenreich von Rindscheit. When Christine's daughter Maria Magdalena married Ruprecht von Glojach, she brought the fortress into the marriage as a morning gift.

As both were avowed Protestants, they had to leave Styria and sold their property in the Salle together with the castle known as the öden gschloß im Khanachtal in der pfar Salath to their aunt Benigna, the wife of Veit Sigmund von Herberstein, in 1629. Another brief mention of the castle, which was presumably no longer inhabited at this time and left to decay, was made in 1638. The archaeological excavations carried out to date have also not produced any finds that can be clearly dated to a time after the 16th century. The finds made during these excavations, such as thicker layers of charcoal and the signs of greater heat exposure to building stones, also allow the assumption that the castle was destroyed by fire during the 16th century or even later.

In 1650, Klingenstein and the surrounding forests passed from the Herberstein family to Leonore Eusebia Countess Wagensperg, who combined it with her Herrschaft Greißenegg. In the following period, there are hardly any written sources that mention the castle, and the ownership structure also remains unknown. On the maps of the Josephinische Landesaufnahme from 1787, the castle is referred to as altes Gschloss. One of the oldest known depictions of the castle is in the background of a painting of St. Barbara in the parish church of Salla created at the end of the 18th century. There is also a pencil drawing from 1894 showing the ruins in detail. In 1834, the name Klingenstein was first mentioned in a document as the name of the castle. Its exact origin is unclear, but the part of the name Klinge- appears as early as 1586 as a place name for a sawyer an der Klingensag in the area around Salla.

=== 19th century until today ===
It was not until the 19th century that the Grein family of stonemasons from Graz appeared as the new owners of the ruins. The first detailed description of the castle ruins dates back to 1925 by the historian Anton Mell. Since the 20th century, it has been privately owned by the Petrasch family from Graz. From 1982/1983, the ruins were secured and largely rebuilt for 25 years by Hubert Stiefmann, who was mayor of the municipality of Salla from 1980 to 1995, although this securing and restoration work has recently also taken the form of new buildings and is therefore controversial among castle researchers.

A total of three smaller archaeological excavations have been carried out on the castle grounds to date. The archaeologist Bernhard Hebert and the historian Ernst Reinhold Lasnik were in charge of all these excavations, some of which were carried out by untrained volunteers such as schoolchildren. The first excavation took place in 1993 as part of a school project and in five days the western building of the Vorwerk was uncovered and its walls secured and renovated. In 1994, the Bundesdenkmalamt carried out a five-day excavation in the core castle, which was only partially excavated. This excavation in the core castle was continued for two days in 2000, during which finds were also made that indicate a possible fire in the castle. Because an elaborate layered excavation was dispensed with during the excavations, an exact separation of finds is no longer possible despite the excavation diaries being kept.

In the summer of 2013, the municipality of Salla laid an electricity cable to the castle hill to illuminate the ruins at night. There are plans to use the castle as a venue for events such as choir concerts.

== Description ==
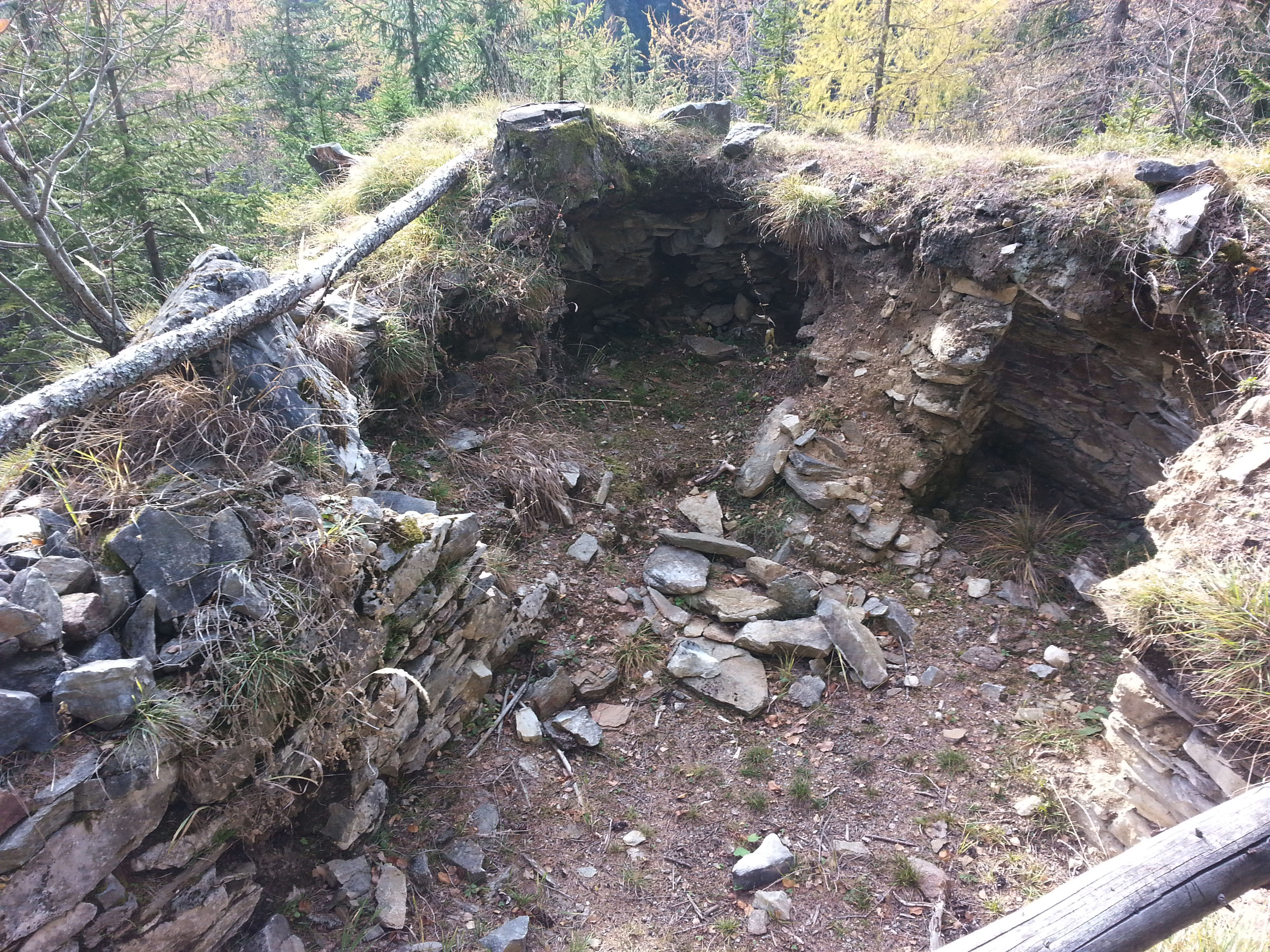
The foundation walls of the eastern building of the outworks with the two areas or chambers formed by a tongue of wall

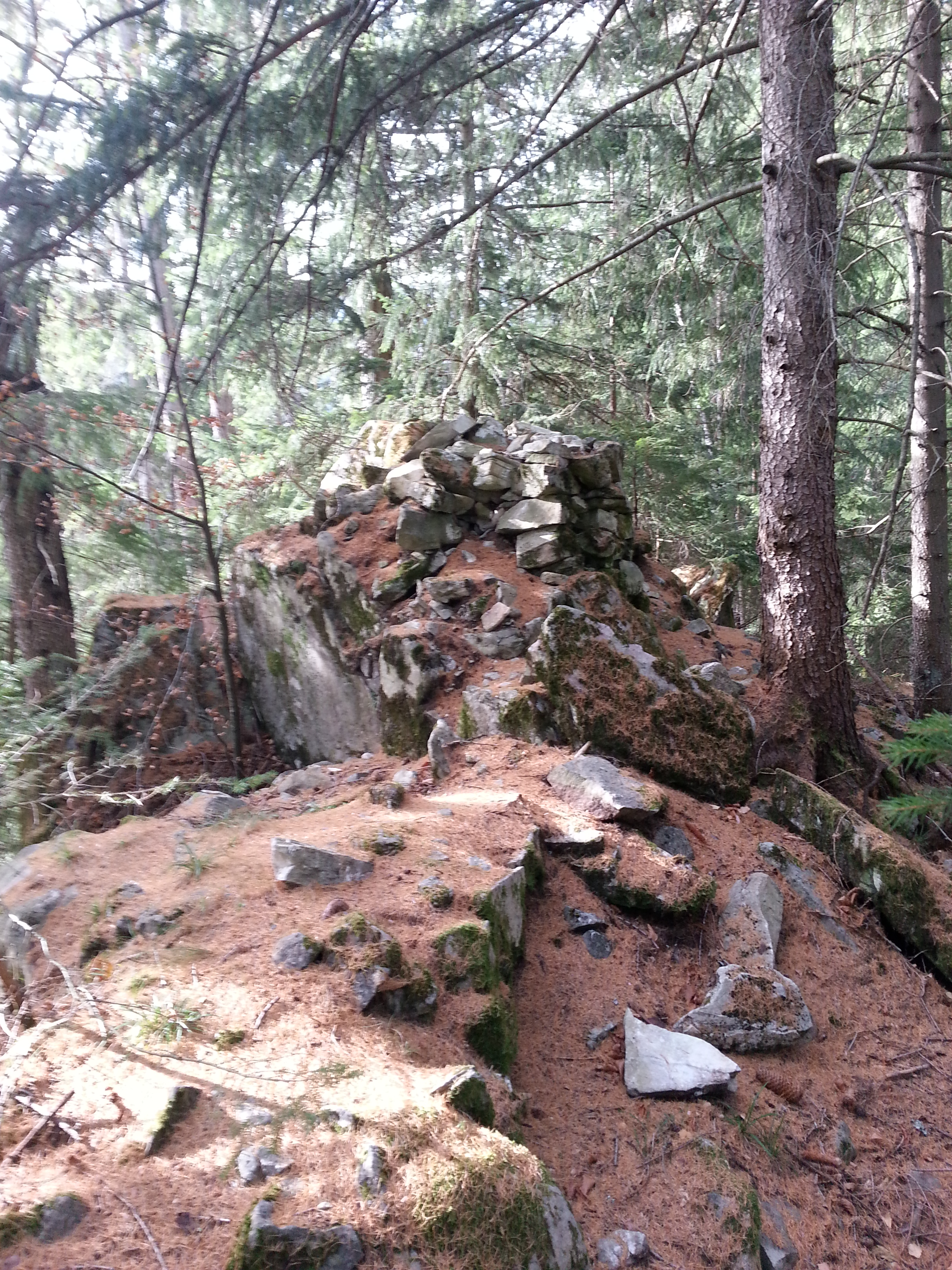
Along the ridge to the west of the core castle are the remains of walls which once probably connected the buildings of the outworks.

=== Outwork ===
On the ridge to the west of the actual core castle, north of the modern access road, there are the remains of the walls of a Vorwerk with at least three buildings or towers, presumably originally connected by walls. These were considered by some historians, such as Robert Baravalle and Herwig Ebner, to be the remains of an older castle construction, but archaeological excavations showed that the oldest part of these walls dates from the time when the core castle was built and thus from the 15th century. The buildings are only preserved in their foundation walls and were only partially uncovered and examined by archaeological excavations. Their exact form and the functions they fulfilled cannot be determined from the findings to date. All parts of the outwork have an irregular and in some cases bedded quarry stone masonry made of locally occurring marble, whereby the size of these quarry stones varies greatly in some cases. Minor differences in the composition of this masonry could indicate that the outwork was built in several phases.

==== Western section with a possible turret or roundel ====
The western end of this outwork, and therefore the part furthest away from the core castle, was a southwest-facing building with a fan-shaped ground plan dating from around the 15th century. It is sometimes interpreted in the literature as a defensive tower or bastion and of which only the foundation walls remain. This building was uncovered in 1993 as part of an excavation, during which the masonry was also partially restored and secured. The wall of this building rises around 1.7 meters above the recent ground level and is rounded and slightly curved inwards at the widest part of the building in the southwest, which is around 4 meters wide. This wall is the only known rounded wall in the entire castle complex. The two other building walls branch off from this arched wall and converge at a boulder in the north-east, where they form the narrowest part of the building at a width of around 1 meter. The length of the interior is around 6.5 meters. The thickness of the building wall varies between 1 meter and just over 1.5 meters. The entire east wall and parts of the north wall were collapsed and were rebuilt in the 20th century. The interior of the building is divided into two irregularly shaped areas or chambers by a tongue protruding from the curved wall in the west. Both of these chambers are smaller than 2 meters. The southern chamber has a 0.53-metre-wide entrance, while the northern chamber, which is about 20 centimetres lower, has a width of 1.5 meters. During excavation work, stone slabs were found at both entrances, which were interpreted as thresholds. In the southern part of the building there is another smaller and slightly higher niche, but its masonry has been destroyed by tree roots to such an extent that it is difficult to reconstruct its original shape. As only the foundation walls of the building have survived, it is not possible to determine the original use and function of the chambers. However, they probably served as storage rooms and the building itself probably had a lookout and defensive function. Its use as a small turret or as a roundel seems possible due to the rounded shape of the building, but must be seen as pure speculation without reliable evidence due to the state of preservation of the building alone.

Around 40 to 60 meters north of this building, on the slope below the modern access road to the castle, there is a wall corner opening to the northeast with no recognizable structural connection to the rest of the outer bailey. The masonry of this corner consists of more irregularly shaped quarrystones than that of the outer bailey and could therefore indicate a different construction period.

==== Middle section ====
Starting from the westernmost building to the east, there is an approximately 85 centimeter wide wall remnant that follows the ridge. Along this ridge there are further piles of rubble, presumably from former walls that connected the individual buildings of the outwork. The exact course of these walls can no longer be identified, which is partly due to the fact that the surviving piles of rubble are partially overgrown and not recognizable as such. The piles of rubble lead to the middle of the three buildings of the outwork, which only consists of a corner of a wall about 4.5 meters long in the northwest and about 1.75 meters long in the northeast, which is about 0.8 meters thick. The function and form of this building are unknown due to the lack of excavation work. However, the corner of the wall formed the northern part of this building or tower. The terrain slopes slightly to the south of the wall, is relatively flat and suggests the floor plan of the former building. If the former building occupied this entire area, it would have been around 6 meters long in the north-west and around 3 meters wide in the south-east.

No clearly recognizable remains of the wall can be found to the east of this wall corner, although this could also be due to the steeper terrain here. To the south-east of the corner of the wall is a slightly lower section of wall with no recognizable connection to the rest of the outbuilding, which makes it difficult to interpret it as a possible building or wall remnant. To the north of this section of wall, on the other side of the ridge, there is another corner of the wall opening up to the north on a small ledge in the terrain. A section of this wall still runs in a northerly direction and extends beyond the ledge. The function of this wall is also unknown. The excavation diary from 1993 sees a plinth or the questionable remains of a bridge in this corner of the wall.

==== Eastern section ====
In the eastern section of the outer bailey, which is closest to the core castle, there are the incompletely preserved foundation walls of another building. This had an almost square ground plan with irregular corners. The north wall is 7.65 meters long on the outside and is preserved except for one gap. The east wall, which also has gaps, is around 7.5 meters long, the west wall around 7.6 meters long and the south wall around 7.25 meters long. The south wall is located directly on steeply sloping terrain and therefore probably has the greatest thickness of the preserved wall sections at around 1.4 meters, as it served as a possible support wall. On the other sides of the building, the wall is around 1 meter thick. The straight end on one of the two sides of the gap in the eastern wall could indicate the former entrance located here. This also seems likely due to the core castle located around 50 meters to the east and the quick access to the building that was possible as a result. The excavation diary from 1993 suspects another entrance in the gap in the north wall.

A wall running to the east adjoins the eastern part of the building and bends in a north-easterly direction after about 2.25 meters. The wall continues in this direction for another 2.4 meters before it ends. The lack of further wall remains and debris cones suggests a defensive wall and not the remains of an attached building.

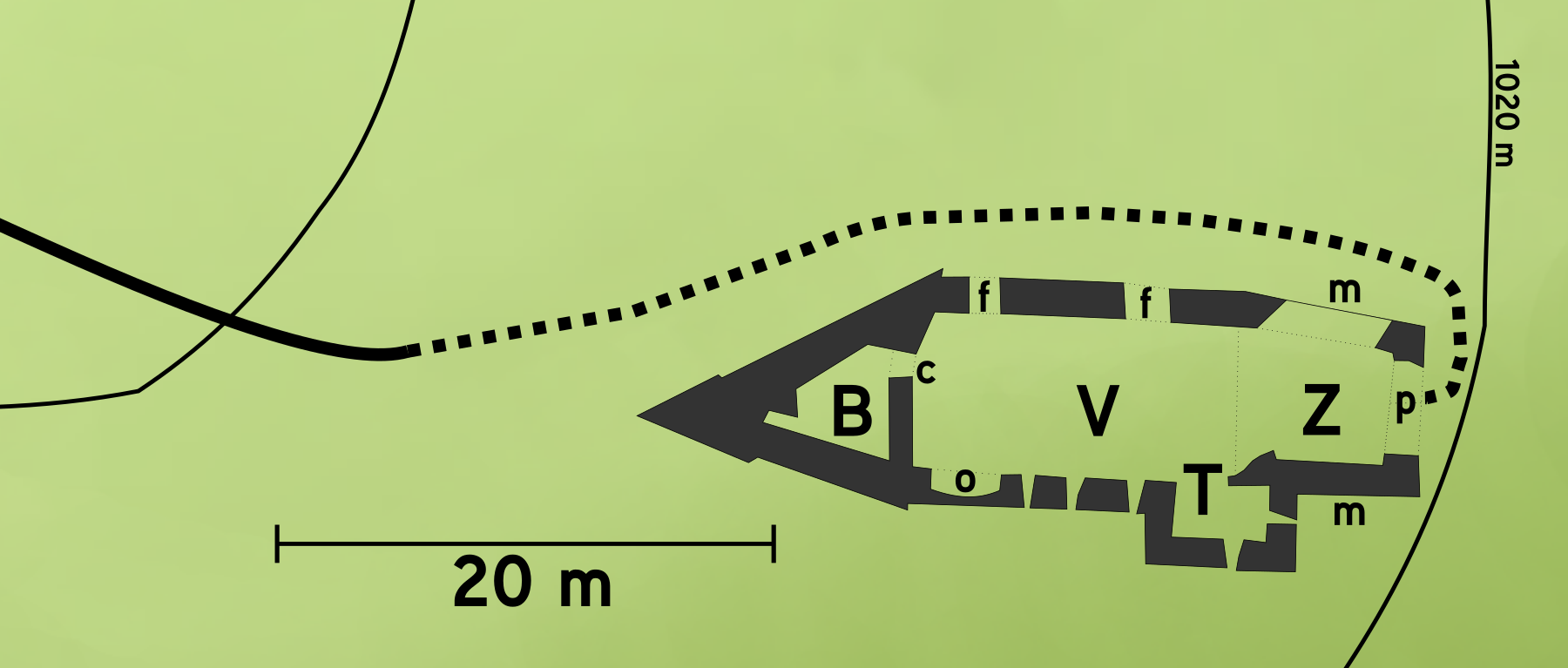
Grundriss der Kernburg von Klingenstein nach Anton Mell in Blätter für Heimatkunde, 1925. The map is northing. Legend: B = keep, c = high entrance of the keep, V = residential building (palas), Z = kennel assumed by Mell, but probably the castle courtyard or part of the palas, T = flanking tower, m = circular wall (Bering), f = window openings, p = castle entrance assumed by Mell, but probably continuous wall, o = round arch portal (original and modern entrance)

=== Core castle and immediate surroundings ===
From the outworks to the west, a neck ditch, largely filled in when the modern access road was built, leads to the core castle at the end of the ridge and thus to the actual castle complex. The ditch can still be seen on the north and south sides of the access road. Originally, a simple bridge probably led over the moat. To the north of the core castle are the remains of walls, some up to 2 meters high, which run along the edge of a cliff and form an almost trapezoidal ground plan, with the part of the wall to the west completely missing. It is unclear whether these are the remains of a building or a curtain wall, and a structural connection to the core castle is also not recognizable.

As far as can be seen, the core castle was built in a single construction phase between the Late Middle Ages and the second half of the 15th century and consists of the keep and a building complex attached to it in the east. The majority of the walls of the core castle preserved above ground were rebuilt as part of renovation and securing work since 1982/1983 and are therefore of more recent origin. The masonry of the core castle, which dates from the late 14th or early 15th century, consists of irregular, unevenly sized and partly loose marble quarry stones and in the lower area of the outer walls also of larger stone blocks. In some places, however, there are also somewhat rectangular Haussteine in the masonry.

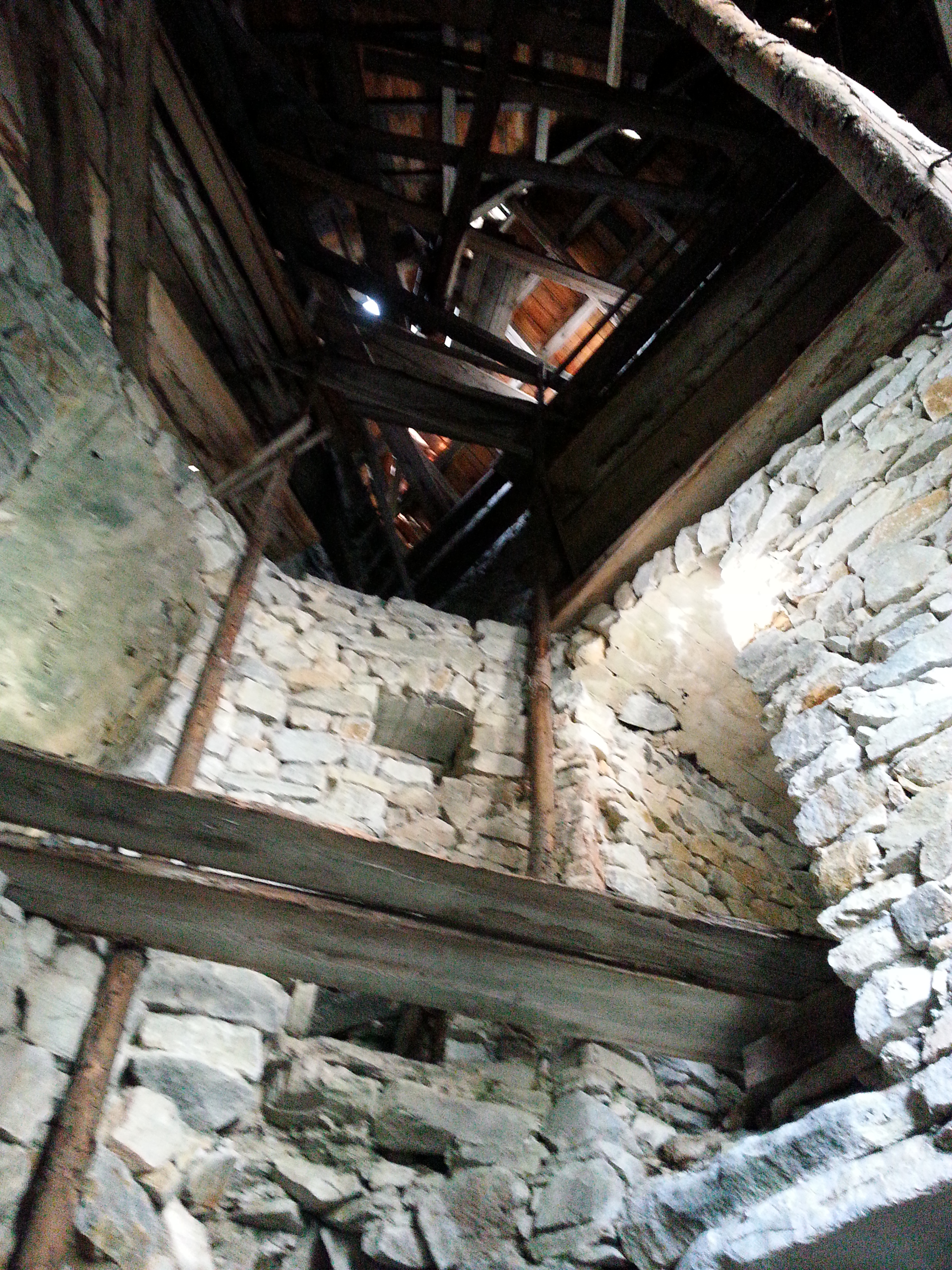
Blick ins Innere des Bergfriedes

==== Keep ====
The mighty keep, built of irregularly arranged marble quarry stones, has an irregular triangular ground plan and faces west with a sharp edge. From there, the path leads to the castle, and the building therefore did not offer a possible attacker a flat attack surface. The outer sides of the keep have a length of 9.84 meters in the southwest, 11.85 meters in the east and 12.68 meters in the northwest. The walls of irregular quarry stone masonry are unevenly thick, with the western sections being thicker. For example, the south-west wall is between 2.2 and 2.3 meters thick and the north-west wall between 1.7 and 2.1 meters thick, while the east wall is only around 1.5 meters wide in the reinforced lower section and tapers towards the top. The east wall was also reinforced on the inside with a 1.8-metre-high wall screen (architecture). Above this blind wall, the east wall is only around 87 centimetres thick. The northwest wall is also around 10 to 20 centimetres thicker up to a height of around half a meter above the recent ground level than in the narrower area above. In the western corner of the keep, where the north-west and north-east walls meet, the masonry reaches a thickness of around 4.2 meters. The original height of the keep before it was rebuilt in the 1980s is not known. The three original window openings in the north wall and a preserved recess in the masonry, which could indicate a possible fourth window, suggest that there were at least three, but probably also four upper storeys. The original entrance to the keep was probably on the second floor of the building attached to it to the east. This high entrance was only added in the upper part during reconstruction. The existing entrance at ground level does not date from the construction period, but already existed before the rebuilding work in the 20th century.

The interior of the keep only has a triangular floor plan in the lower section. A section of wall in the western corner at a height of 1.8 to 2 meters above the ground creates an irregular pentagonal shape. The walls have a length of around 5.1 meters in the east, 0.9 meters in the north-east, around 3.8 meters in the north-west, around 1.2 meters in the west and around 3.9 meters in the south-west at a height of around 2 meters on the inside. Light enters the interior of the keep through two vertical light slits in the lower part of the north-west and south-west walls. The light slit in the south-west wall was added during the renovation work carried out in the 1980s, as the wall in this area was in a poor state of repair. The light slits are around 50 centimetres wide on the inside and taper to a width of 10 to 20 centimetres on the outside. Remains of plaster have been preserved in the lower part of the east wall. In the original masonry there are several square holes measuring around 10 to 20 centimetres, which presumably supported the beams of the false ceilings. In the northern and western corners of the keep, there are several niches around 50 centimetres high, 60 centimetres wide and between 60 and 85 centimetres deep, which are also lined with stone slabs in the western corner. On the second floor, there are two steps on the north-west wall that lead to the north-west, i.e. towards the outer wall. As this wall is not thick enough for a complete staircase that could lead to the next upper floor, they probably originally led to a niche with a ladder, a bay window or a raised window opening.

The tiles and stove clay found during an excavation, probably made in the late 15th century by a workshop in the Hungarian Buda and reliefed, suggest that there was at least a small tiled stove in the keep.

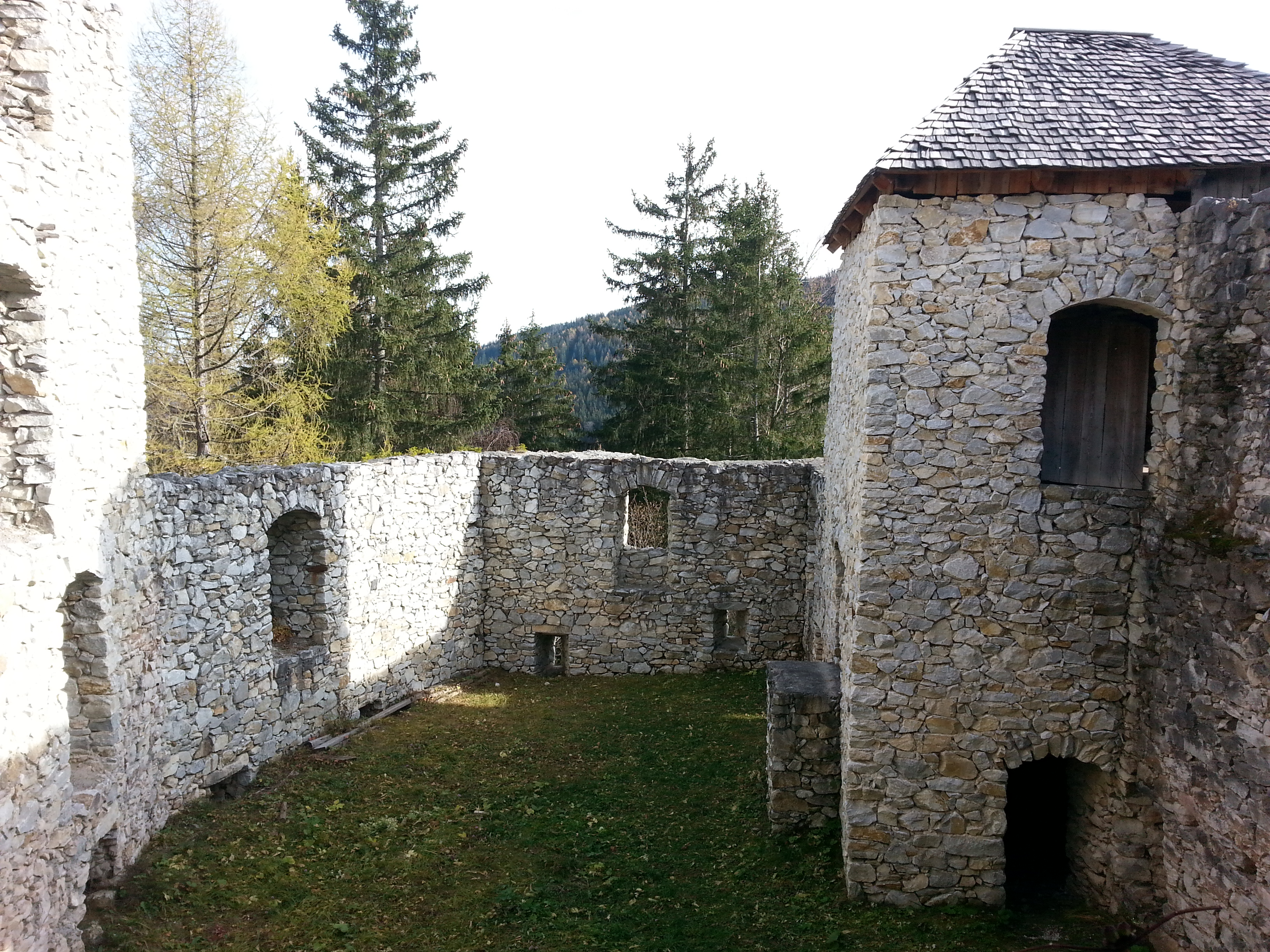
View from the keep to the north wall (left) and the east wall of the building complex as well as the flanking tower (right)

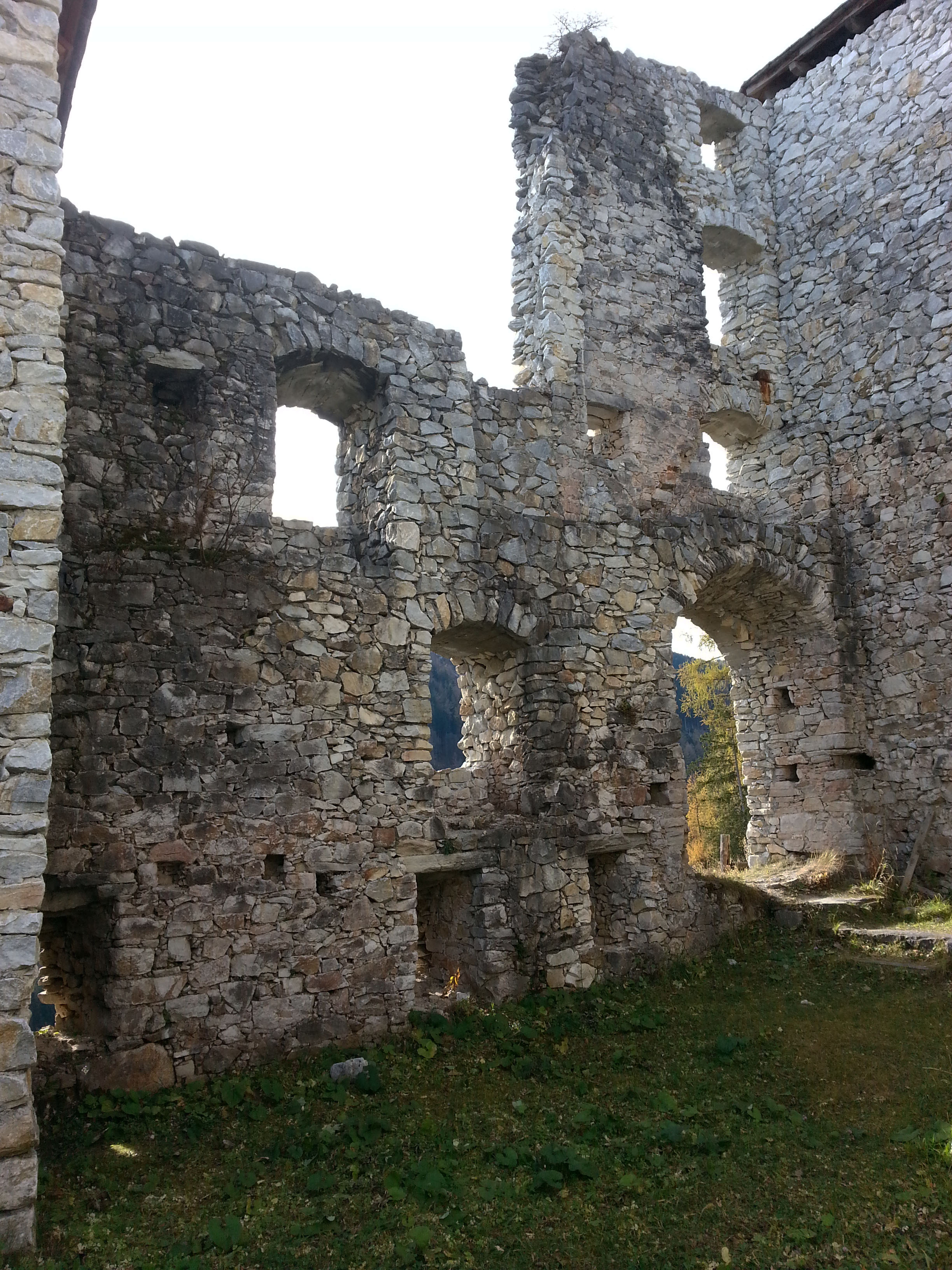
The south-western wall of the building complex with the round arch portal

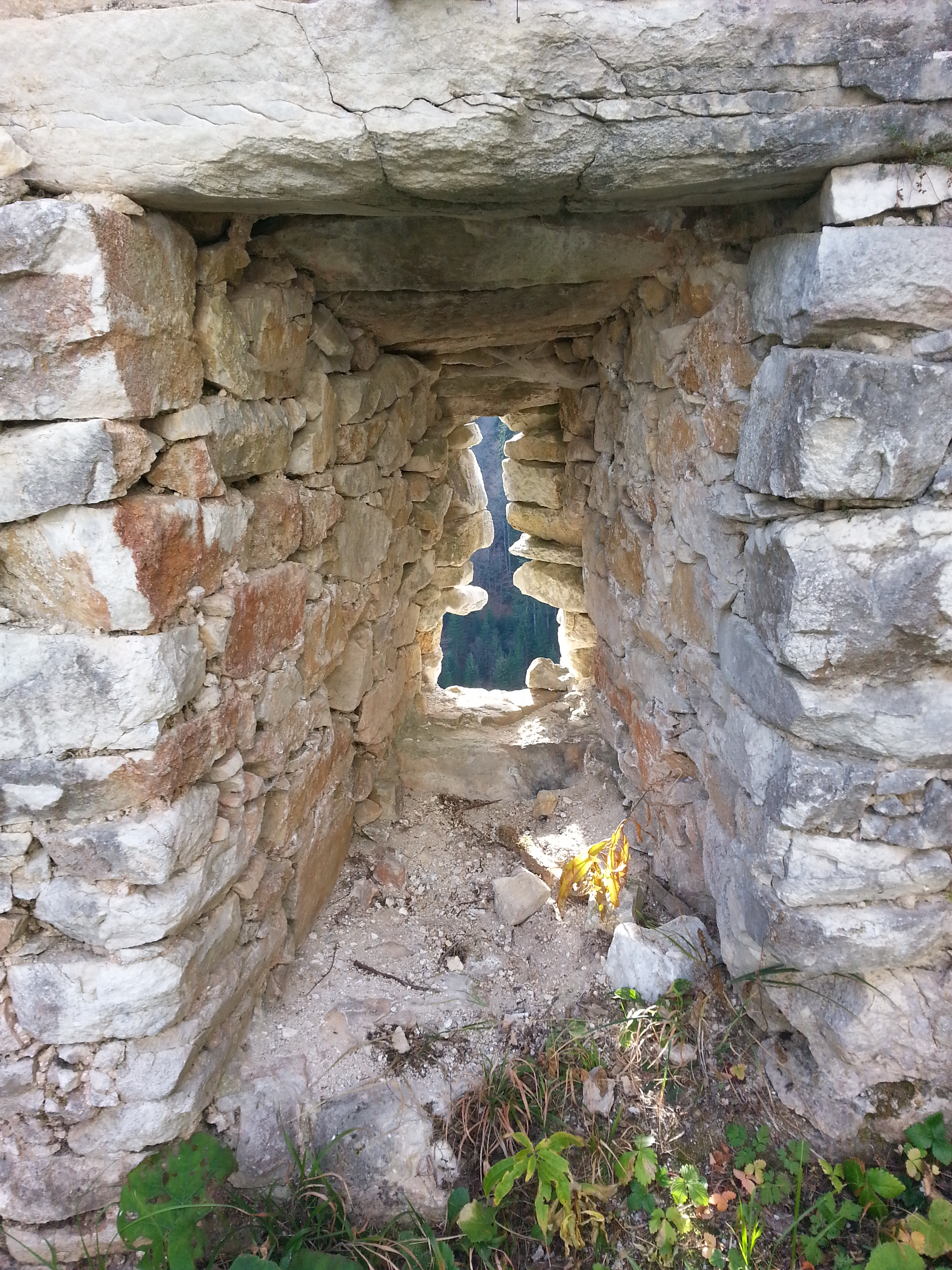
One of the castle's embrasures laid out as spade embrasures

==== Building complex to the east of the keep and flanking tower ====
To the east of the keep is a building complex with an irregular, roughly rectangular ground plan and a tower attached to the south-east, which has only been preserved in outline. The exact appearance and function of this complex can only be guessed at from the existing finds and walls, and it is possible to deduce the attached buildings based on the original window openings in the wall that have been preserved. The reconstruction work carried out since the 1980s also makes it difficult to interpret this building. Anton Mell saw the complex as a Bering, which surrounded a residential building or the Palas. The question of whether the entire area was covered by a single building or whether there was a courtyard is also disputed.

The walled area of this complex has a clear length of around 18 meters and is around 8.2 meters wide directly east of the keep. It widens to around 10 meters up to the tower and finally narrows to around 6 meters towards the eastern end. The thickness of the walls, most of which have been rebuilt since the 1980s, varies between 1.3 and 1.4 meters. The original south-eastern corner of the wall is only around 0.9 meters thick. On the northern wall, directly to the east of the keep, there are three fully preserved windows, more or less directly above one another, as well as a fourth window that has been partially preserved. A window further to the east in this wall probably also dates from the construction period, at least the eastern reveal appears to be original. All other window openings on the north wall date from the modern reconstruction work. Several square holes can be found slightly below the window openings on the original preserved parts of the wall, which presumably supported the beams for the intermediate ceilings of the buildings. With the exception of the outer wall, no other walls or partition walls can be seen above ground. Another exception is a wall stump on the north wall, which is probably the base of a partition wall. The building on the north wall was probably the palas, i.e. the residential building of the castle, through which the keep could also be entered. The windows suggest that there were at least four upper storeys. It is possible that the palas filled the entire area between the north and south walls of the building complex. There are five embrasures on the north wall, each about 2.5 meters apart.

Most of the castle's embrasures are so-called Spatenscharten and were probably already designed for the use of firearms. On the outside, they consist of a vertical slit 0.5 to 0.6 meters long and around 0.1 meters wide, which ends in a widened, roughly rectangular base 0.2 to 0.3 meters wide and slightly lowered towards the outside. On the inside, the embrasures consist of a wide rectangle that tapers towards the slit and has a flat stone slab at the top. Some of these embrasures still have holes in which a Prellholz (a horizontal wooden brace for the hook of an arquebus) was probably originally fastened. Only two embrasures in the eastern part of the north wall are not spade embrasures, but simple slit embrasures.

The modern and probably also original access to the castle is via a 2.7-metre-wide round arch portal in the southern wall, directly east of the keep. On the side walls of this portal there are two holes, one above the other, between 0.6 and 0.9 meters deep with a side length of around 20 centimetres. They may have originally provided space for the sliding beams or the brackets of a castle gate. On the western inside of this portal there is another roughly square-shaped opening with a side length of around 25 centimetres, which is around 2.1 meters deep and extends into the masonry of the keep. To the east of the portal are three embrasures which, at least in more recent times, are deeper than the entrance to the castle. It is possible that the building complex originally had a different ground level or that a staircase or ramp led up to the portal. The terrain on the outside of the portal was originally steep and rocky and was leveled in the 20th century to make access easier. Some castle researchers therefore assume that a wooden bridge led to the portal during its original period of use. The absence of the original east wall, which was only rebuilt in the 20th century, also suggests an entrance on this side. In his description of the castle from 1925, Anton Mell mentioned a 35-centimetre-wide plastered channel that has not survived. canal. This led from the embrasure to the east of the portal up to the wall, but also branched off to the portal itself, and Mell assumed that it was a kind of mouthpiece for the castle garrison. The three windows in the wall above the entrance portal are probably not original, even if the wall here is otherwise quite well preserved in its original state.

Slightly east of the portal, in the south-east of the building complex, an almost square flanking tower protrudes from the southern wall. The north-western corner and the tower's raised walls were rebuilt and roofed over from the 1980s onwards. Originally, there was a window in the upper storey of the tower, at least on the south side. It is between 5 and 6 meters long on each of the outer sides. Its walls also vary in thickness, being between 1.3 and 1.4 meters thick on the south and west sides and 1.2 meters thick on the east side, while the north side facing the interior of the castle is only around 0.9 meters thick. There are four embrasures on the ground floor, two of which face east and one each to the south and west. The more northerly of the two eastern embrasures is higher than the rest of the tower's embrasures.

Nothing remains of the former castle chapel dedicated to St. Catherine.

== Legends and tales ==
There are several legends and tales surrounding Klingenstein Castle. According to the local population, Klingenstein is connected to Burg Hauenstein near Gallmannsegg by a secret underground passage, as Josef von Scheiger remarked in 1868. However, this seems to be impossible due to the distance of more than 12 kilometers between the two facilities. Another secret passage full of great treasures, which is said to lead from the castle down into the valley to the Gregorbauer or Gregerbauer farm, is known to J. Leitner reports in his parish chronicle of Salla published in 1995. According to a legend recorded by Ernst Reinhold Lasnik, a white woman from the castle is also said to have visited the Gregerbäurin through this secret passage to inform her of recent deaths in Salla. Leitner also wrote down the legend that the child who first lies in a cradle made from the wood of the trees growing on the castle hill is said to come into a treasure or great wealth. The historian Josef A. Janisch reported stories from the local inhabitants that robber barons once lived in this castle.

In 1834, Georg Göth noted in his statistical survey for Archduke Johann that a knight who owned the castle is said to have fallen from his horse at the so-called Ofnerkreuz in Salla and died when he saw that his castle was on fire. This story could have a kernel of truth, as evidence of a possible fire at the castle was found during archaeological excavations.

== Literature ==
- Levente Horváth: Die Burg Salla/Klingenstein. Eine späte Höhenburg der Weststeiermark. Graz 2013.
- Werner Murgg (2009), Bundesdenkmalamt (ed.), Burgruinen der Steiermark, Fundberichte aus Österreich. Materialhefte. Reihe B, 2, Wien: Ferdinand Berger & Söhne, pp. 156–157, ISSN 1993-1263
