= Lavant (river) =

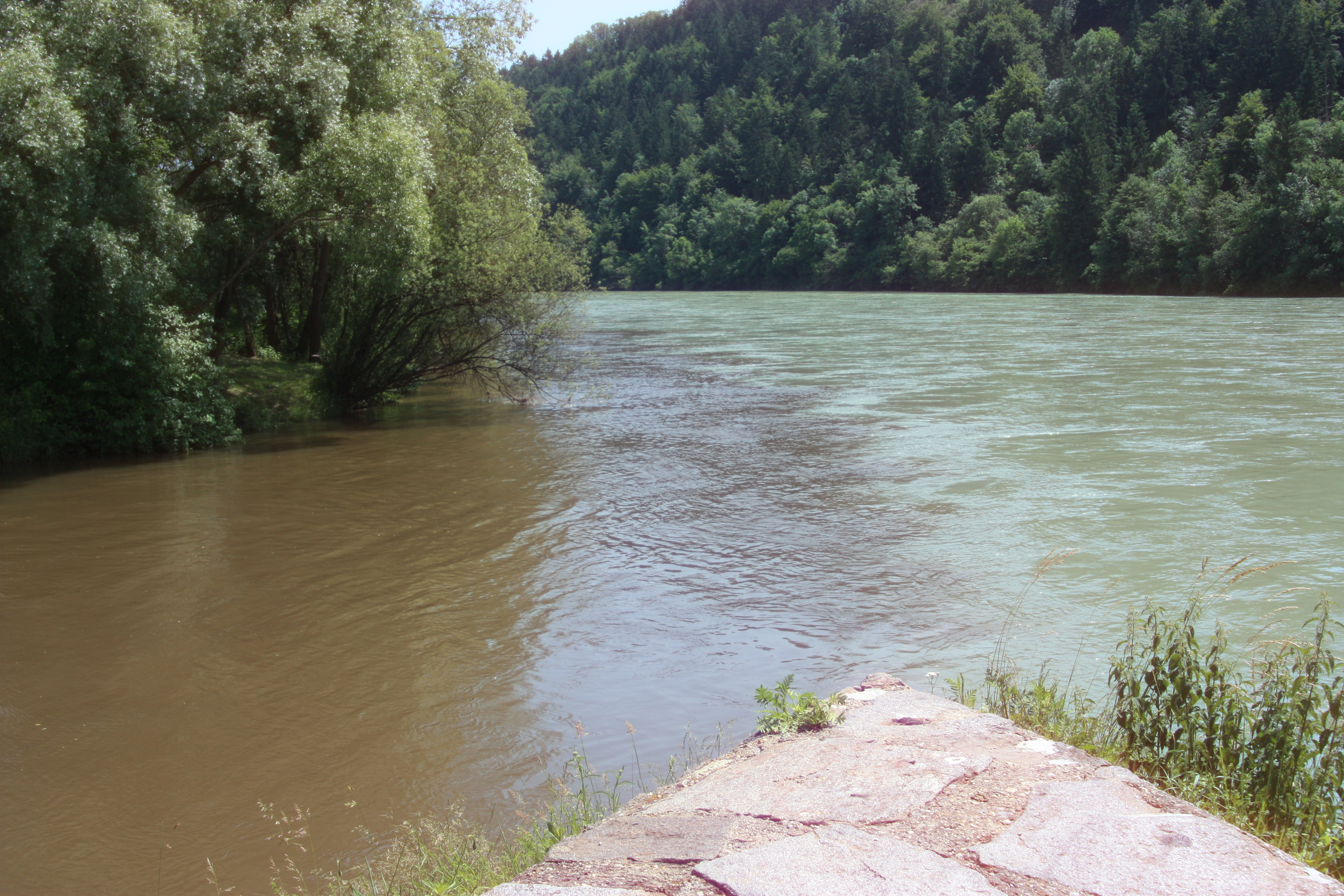
- Confluence of the Lavant (left) with the Drava

Location
- Country: Austria

Physical characteristics
- Source
  - location: Zirbitzkogel, Seetal Alps near Sankt Anna am Lavantegg, Styria
  - coordinates: 47°3′34″N 14°34′39″E
  - elevation: 2,053 m (6,736 ft)
- Mouth
  - location: Drava at Lavamünd, Carinthia
  - coordinates: 46°38′22″N 14°56′39″E
  - elevation: 340 m (1,120 ft)
- Length: 72.0 km (44.7 mi)
- Basin size: 968.7 km^{2} (374.0 sq mi)
- Discharge
  - average: 12.5 m^{3}/s (440 cu ft/s)

Basin features
- Progression: Drava→ Danube→ Black Sea

The Lavant (Slovene: Labotnica) is a river in the Austrian state of Carinthia, a left tributary of the Drava. It lends its name to the Lavanttal valley as well as to the Lavanttal Alps.

The river originates in the small Lake Lavant (Lavantsee) at the southern slope of the Zirbitzkogel mountain in Styria, at a height of 2,053 m (6,736 ft). It then runs southeastwards and after 11.2 kilometres (7.0 mi) reaches the border with Carinthia. The river flows down the Lavanttal valley with the towns of Bad Sankt Leonhard, Wolfsberg and Sankt Andrä, until it reaches the Drava shortly before the border to Slovenia. Its drainage basin is 968.7 km^{2} (374.0 sq mi).

The water quality has been affected by large-scale river regulations between the 1930s and 1980s. Most parts of the Lavant belong to the trout zone, while the lowest sections are characterised by barbels.

The name Lavant stems from the Pre-Celtic period, meaning "shining river" in Indo-European.
