= Christine Lavant =

Austrian poet and novelist

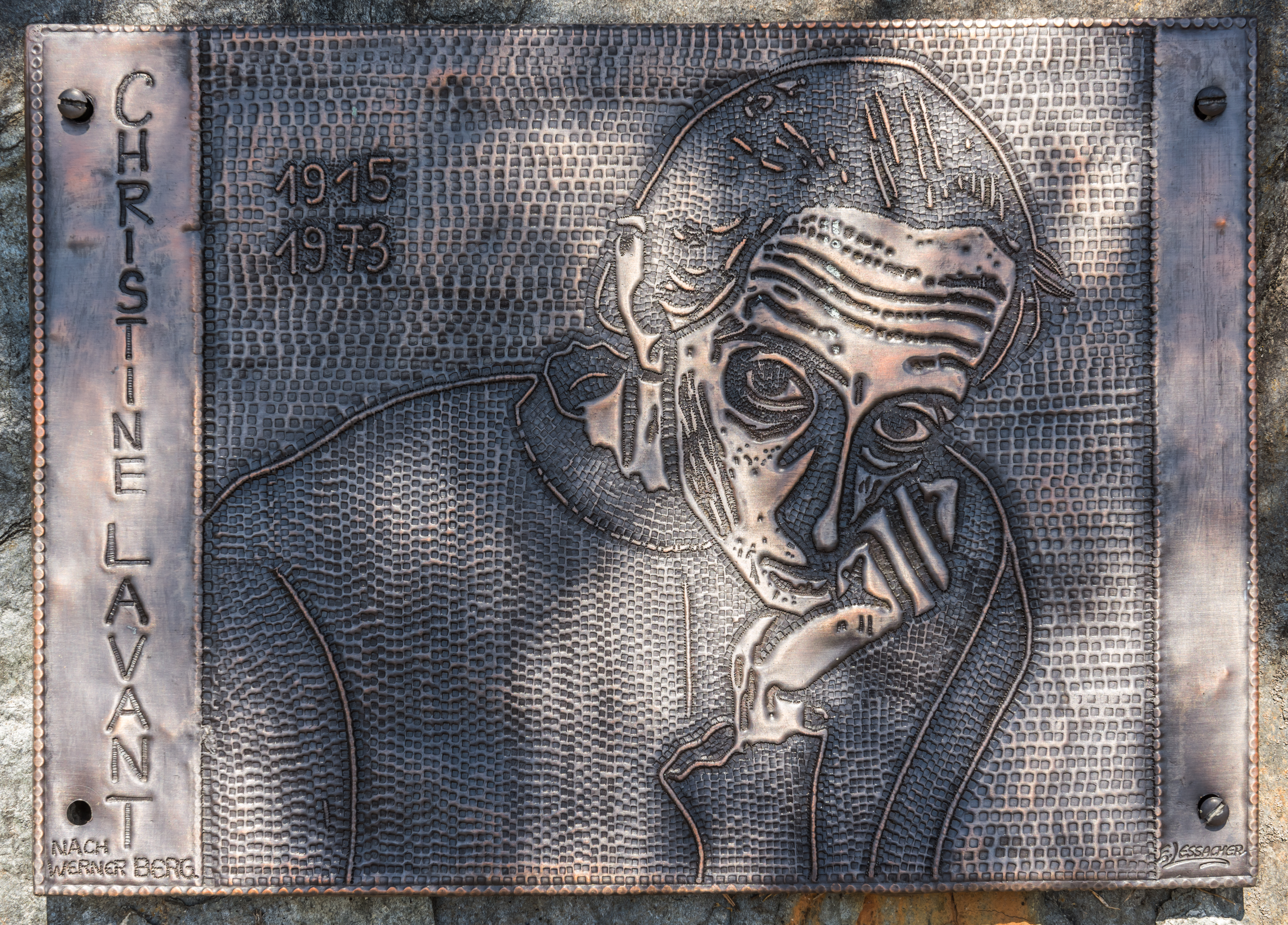
Memorial plaque at the poets stones grove in Zammelsberg, Weitensfeld, Carinthia

Christine Lavant (born Christine Thonhauser, mar. Christine Habernig; 4 July 1915 – 7 June 1973) was an Austrian poet and novelist.

== Life ==
Lavant was born in the hamlet of Großedling (today part of Wolfsberg) in the Lavant Valley, Carinthia, the ninth child of a poor miner's family. Later she adopted the name of the valley as her pseudonym.

The newborn had scrofula of the breast, neck and face, and nearly went blind. From the age of three, the child at regular intervals contracted pneumonia and physicians treated her as nonviable; nevertheless she was enrolled in primary school (Volksschule) in 1921. During a hospitalisation in Klagenfurt, the chief physician noted Lavant's literary interest and presented her an edition of Rainer Maria Rilke's works, which she carried on her 60 kilometres (37 mi) walk home. In 1927 her health again declined and she was only able to finish primary school with continual interruptions two years later, after being exposed to a risky X-ray treatment. She had to abandon the subsequent attendance at the lower secondary school (Hauptschule) as the way was too long for the feeble child.

Lavant had to stay at her parents' home and occupied herself with painting, writing, reading, and needleworks. A protracted middle ear infection left a single-sided hearing impairment. In the early 1930s, she came down with a major depression, but also focused on painting and writing and offered a first novel to a Graz publishing house. The manuscript was finally rejected in 1932, whereafter Lavant completely destroyed her writing and in 1935 attended the Klagenfurt sanatorium. Her financial condition worsened after her parents had died in quick succession in 1937 and 1938. Supported by her knitting and subsidised by her siblings, she married the painter and former landowner Josef Habernig, about 35 years her senior.

After World War II, Lavant again began to compose lyric poetry, which eventually gained some attention by the Austrian literary scene. A first volume was released by a Stuttgart publisher who recommended her to prose, whereafter she came out with the novella Das Kind (The Child) in the same year. She became publicly known after an appearance at a 1950 reading in Sankt Veit. Lavant relocated to her hometown Wolfsberg, where she lived in reclusion for the rest of her life. When in 1964 her husband died after a stroke, she had a breakdown in health and again had to undergo hospital treatment. Lavant died, aged 57, in Wolfsberg.

Her poems have been described as "almost mystically religious" and "archaic". Rilke and Christianity are seen as influences on her work.

== Awards ==
- 1954 Georg Trakl Prize
- 1964 Anton Wildgans Prize
- 1964 Georg Trakl Prize
- 1970 Grand Austrian State Prize for literature
