= Amering =

- Former municipality
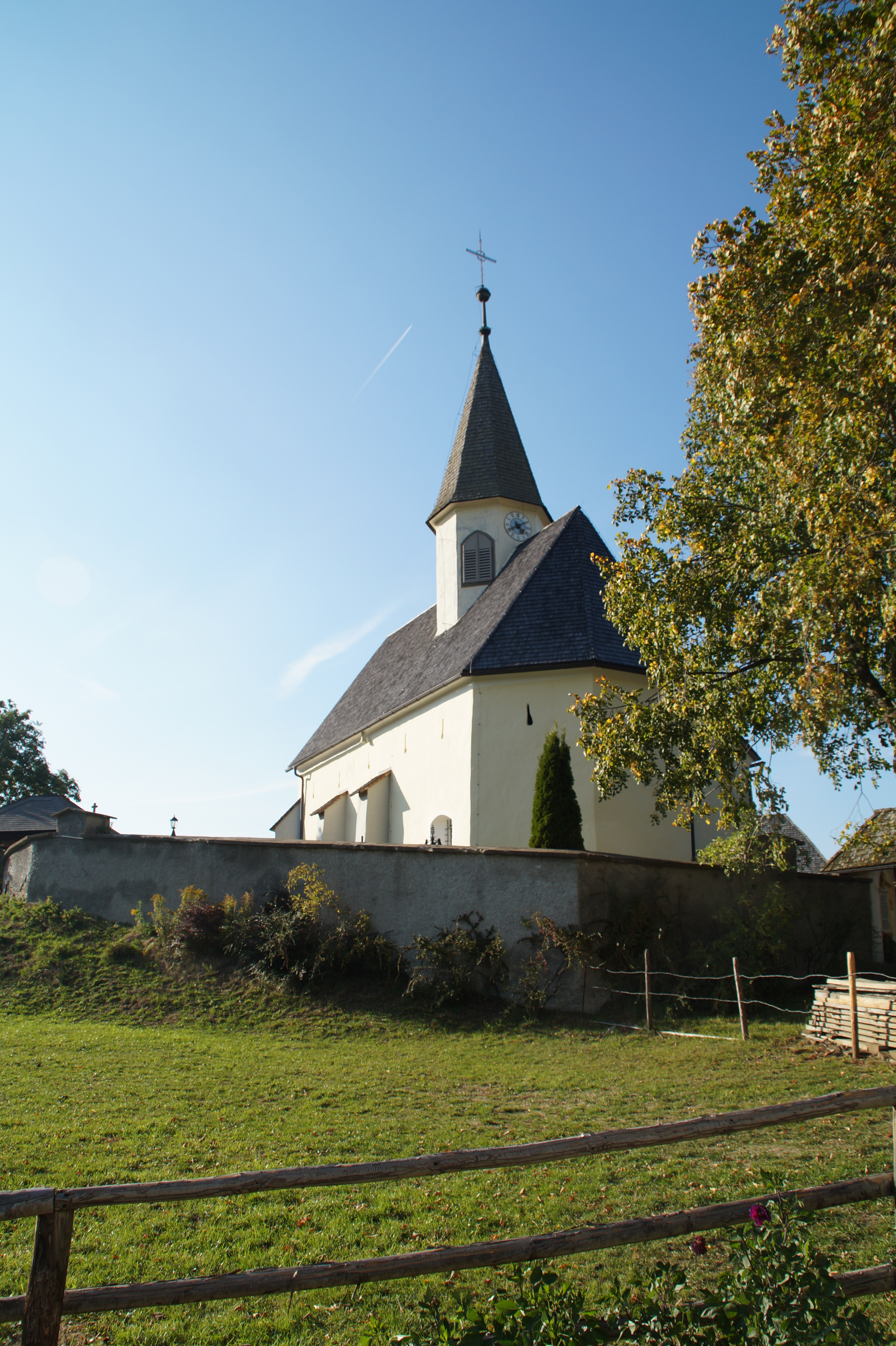
- Amering parish church

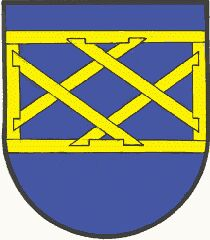
- Coat of arms

- Location within Austria
- Coordinates: 47°03′00″N 14°44′00″E
- Country: Austria
- State: Styria
- District: Murtal

Area
  - Total: 48 km^{2} (19 sq mi)
- Elevation: 407 m (1,335 ft)

Population (1 January 2016)
  - Total: 1,080
  - Density: 22/km^{2} (58/sq mi)
- Time zone: UTC+1 (CET)
  - Summer (DST): UTC+2 (CEST)
- Postal code: 8742
- Area code: 03578
- Vehicle registration: JU
- Website: www.amering. steiermark.at

Amering is a former municipality in the district of Murtal in Styria, Austria. Since the 2015 Styria municipal structural reform, it is part of the municipality Obdach.
