= Noric Alps =

Various mountain ranges of the Eastern Alps

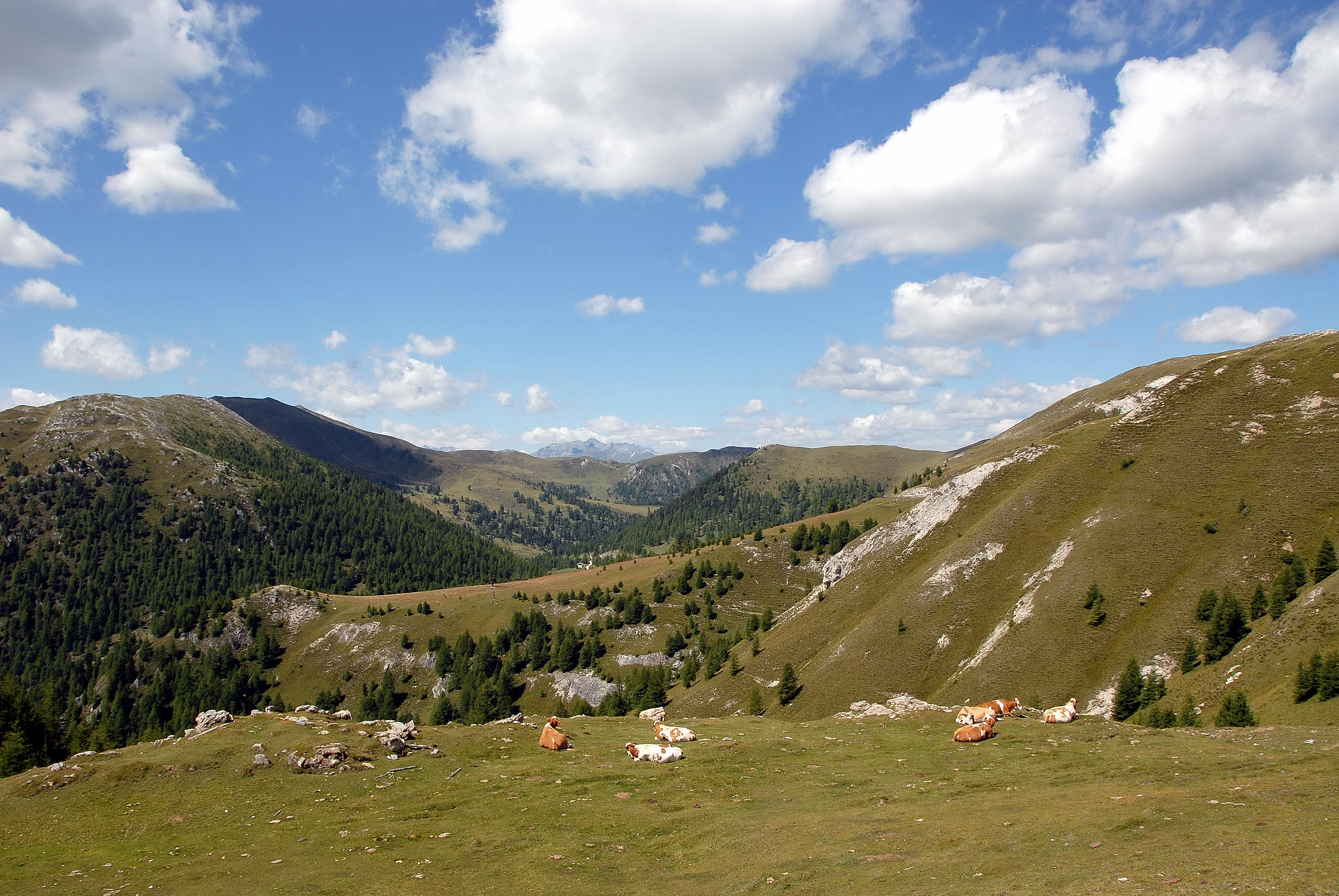
- Nock Mountains

Highest point
- Peak: Eisenhut
- Elevation: 2,441 m (8,009 ft)
- Coordinates: 46°57′11″N 13°55′45″E

Geography
- Countries: Austria; Slovenia
- States: Carinthia; Styria; Lower Styria
- Parent range: Central Eastern Alps

The Noric Alps (German: Norische Alpen) is a collective term denoting various mountain ranges of the Eastern Alps. The name derives from the ancient Noricum province of the Roman Empire on the territory of present-day Austria and the adjacent Bavarian and Slovenian area.

== Concept history ==
Referring to extinct Noricum, the designation originally comprised the Alpine mountain ranges in the medieval Bavarian stem duchy of East Francia, including the later Tyrol, Salzburg and Upper Austrian regions.

In the 19th century, the German term Norische Alpen covered the whole group of ranges of the Central Eastern and Northern Limestone Alps east of the Dreiherrnspitze peak. The Noric Alps were considered the major northern range of the Eastern Alps, alongside the Carnic Alps (i.e. the Carnic Alps proper, Gailtal Alps, Karawanks, Kamnik–Savinja Alps, and Pohorje) in the south and the Julian Alps in the southeast. Later the meaning was confined to the ranges south of the Alpine divide between the Mur and Drava rivers

== Geography ==
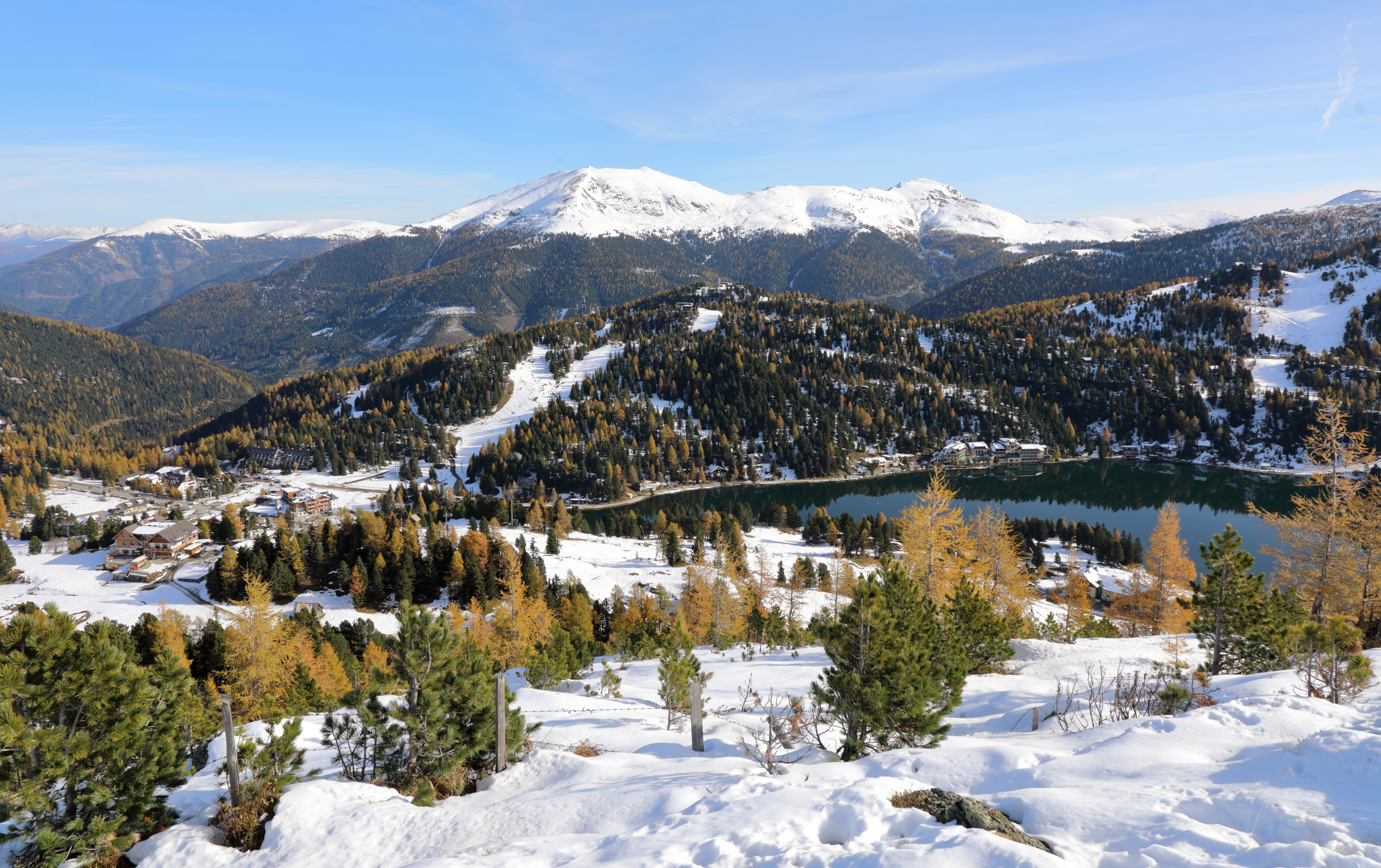
Mt. Eisenhut and Wintertalernock

In the traditional context, the Noric Alps are located mostly in Austria — 98% of the region is Austrian, mainly in the southern states of Carinthia and Styria—, with a small area in the adjacent Lower Styria region of Slovenia.

The area covers 9,811 km^{2} (3,788 sq mi) and stretches 97 km (60 mi) from the upper Mur River in the North to the Drava in the South and 176 km (109 mi) from the Katschberg Pass in the West to the Mur River in the East. The Noric Alps are surrounded by the Hohe Tauern range in the West and the Low Tauern in the North, in the South they border on the Gailtal Alps, the Karavanke and Pohorje ranges of the Southern Limestone Alps.

The highest point is Mt. Eisenhut in Styria, which, at 2,441 m (8,009 ft), is only modest in the context of the Eastern Alps, where many mountains rise above 3,000 m (10,000 ft). Other notable peaks in the range are Rosennock (2,440 m (8,010 ft)), Zirbitzkogel (2,396 m (7,861 ft)) and Großer Speikkogel (2,140 m (7,020 ft)).

In the south the Noric Alps comprise the Klagenfurt Basin with the historic centres of Zollfeld and Magdalensberg. The mountainside is characterised by transhumance (Alm) agriculture and was also a mining area, still for magnesite in the area of Radenthein. Today the region largely depends on tourism, in winter around the ski aras of Bad Kleinkirchheim, Krems, at Katschberg, Turracher Höhe and Klippitztörl, in summer around several picturesque Carinthian lakes like Wörthersee, Lake Millstatt or Lake Ossiach. The Nock Mountain National Park, accessible via the Nockalmstraße scenic road, is a protected landscape according to IUCN V category.

The Norian Age in the Triassic Period of geological time is named for the Noric Alps

== Classification ==
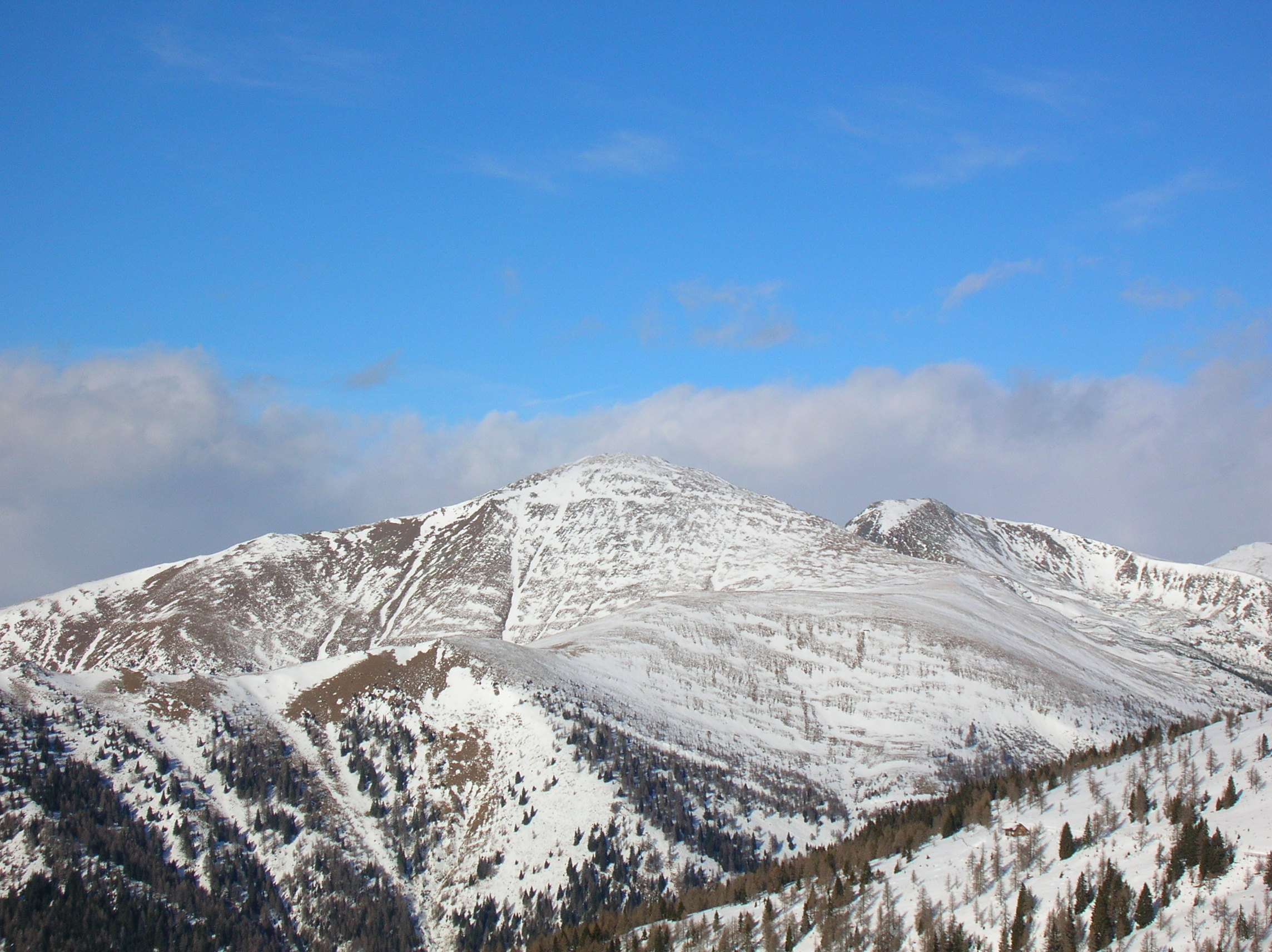
Rosennock summit

The Italian Partizione delle Alpi classification of 1926 referred to the Alpi Noriche as the mountain chain from the Mur in the East up to the Brenner Pass in the West, including High and Low Tauern as well as Tux and Zillertal Alps.

According to the Alpine Club classification, the Noric Alps are divided into

- the Gurktal Alps in the west, with the highest peaks in the Nock Mountains (Nockberge) region, and
- the Lavanttal Alps up to the Mur River in the east, including the Poßruck/Kozjak range and Radl Pass at the Austrian-Slovene border in the south

separated by the Neumarkt Pass.

The Noric Alps roughly correspond to the Carinthian-Styrian Alps according to the recent unofficial SOIUSA classification.
