= Zirbitzkogel =

Highest point in Seetal Alps, Austria

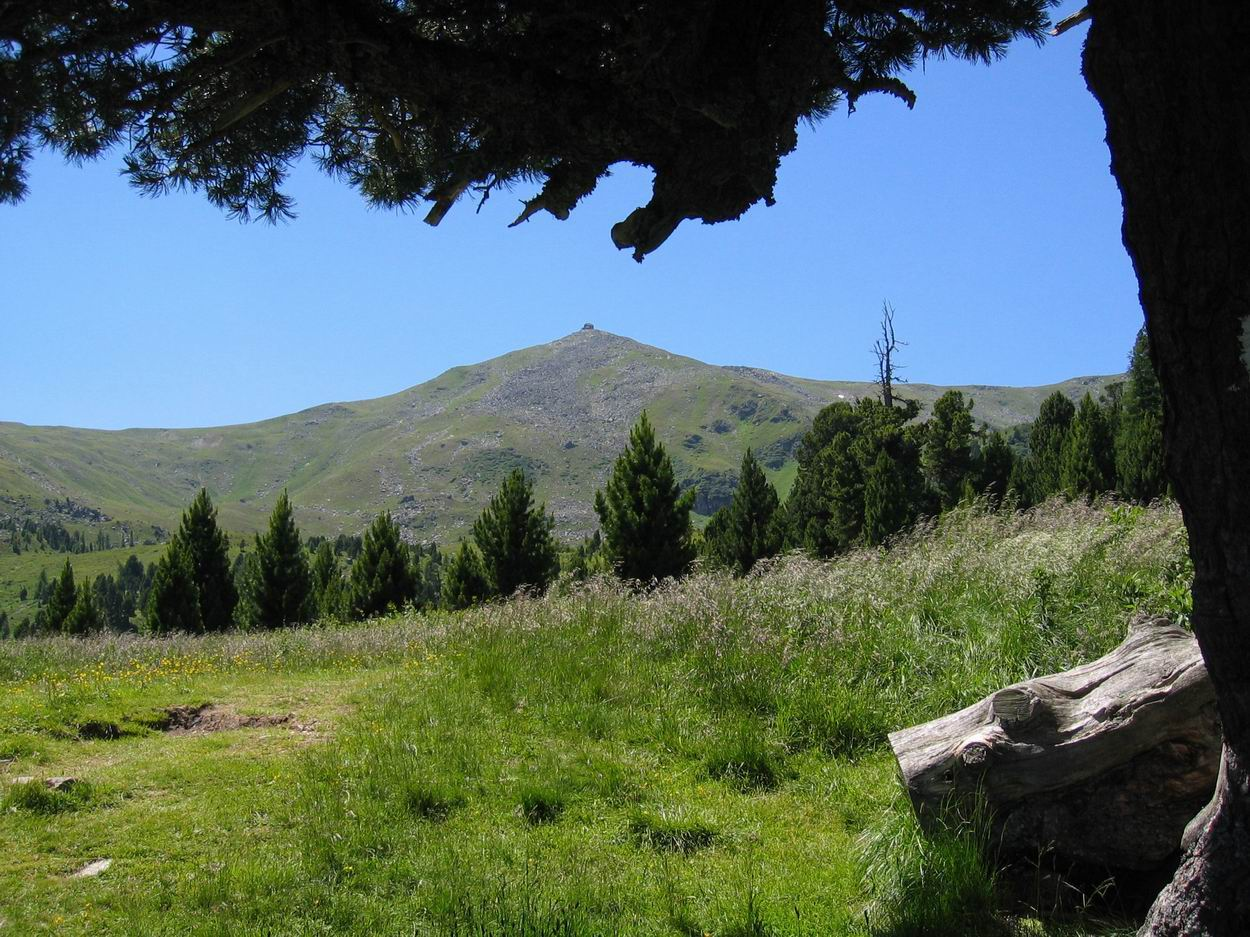
- The Zirbitzkogel with the Zirbitzkogelhaus

Highest point
- Elevation: 2,396 m (AA) (7,861 ft)
- Prominence: 1,502 m ↓ Neumarkt Saddle
- Isolation: 33.2 km → Seckauer Zinken (Seckauer Tauern)
- Listing: Ultra
- Coordinates: 47°03′00″N 14°34′00″E

Geography
- Location within Alps
- Location: Styria, Austria
- Parent range: Seetal Alps

Climbing
- Normal route: walk

The Zirbitzkogel (German: [ˈt͡siɐ̯bit͡sˌkoːgl̩, ˈt͡siʁbit͡sˌkoːgl̩]), at 2,396 m (AA), is the highest point of the Seetal Alps in Austria. It lies south of the Upper Mur valley in Styria near its border with Carinthia. The Lavant, a left tributary of the Drau, has its source on the southern slopes of the mountain.

== Mountain ==
Its name is not derived, as popularly supposed, from the Swiss pine trees (known in German as Zirben) that dominate the woods in places, but from the Slovenian word zirbiza, that can be translated as "red mountain pasture", which is a reference to the red-petalled alpenrose (Rhododendron ferrugineum) that is common hereabouts. In the local region this rhododendron plant is also known as Almrausch ("alp delirium"), perhaps an indication of the toxicity of the plants.

The summit block of the Zirbitzkogel is formed of crystalline rock; slate, gneisses and granites predominating. In spite of its comparatively low height it exhibits a definite high mountain character. Its relief was formed by ice age glaciers and subsequent slope movements. In the very spring-rich region are several tarns, such as the two Winterleitenseen.

Dense spruce forests cover the slopes up to the subalpine zone before being succeeded by scattered stands of spruce, larch and Swiss pine (Swiss pine-larch forest). In the summit area a ragged sedge grassland dominates, interspersed with almost level plateaus. The summit became well known to ornithologists as a breeding habitat for the dotterel, a few pairs of which bred almost all year round until 1995. Thereafter no more broods were sighted, although individual migrants and roosting birds were observed. Wind-exposed spots are dominated by Alpine Azalea and various lichens.

The area is also known to butterfly researchers for several very rare species, including the endemite, Elophos zirbitzensis.

The touristically well developed Zirbitzkogel is a popular hiking and touring region. At its summit is the Zirbitzkogelhaus, other huts lie along the routes of ascent. Suitable starting points for climbing the Zirbitzkogel are St. Anna and St. Wolfgang bei Obdach on the northern side and Neumarkt on the southern side.

The Zirbitzkogel region was incorporated into the Natura 2000 regions and has been designated a European protected area since May 2006.

== Huts ==
- Winterleiten Hut (1,782 m) northeast of the Zirbitzkogel, in the middle of the Schmelz Training Area.
- Sabathy Hut (1,620 m), at the eastern foot of the Zirbitzkogel
- Zirbitzkogelhaus (2,376 m), just below the summit of the Zirbitzkogel
- Waldheim Hut (1,614 m), halfway up between Obdach and the Zirbitzkogel
- Tonner Hut (1,600 m), halfway up between Mühlen (village) and the Zirbitzkogel

== Gallery ==
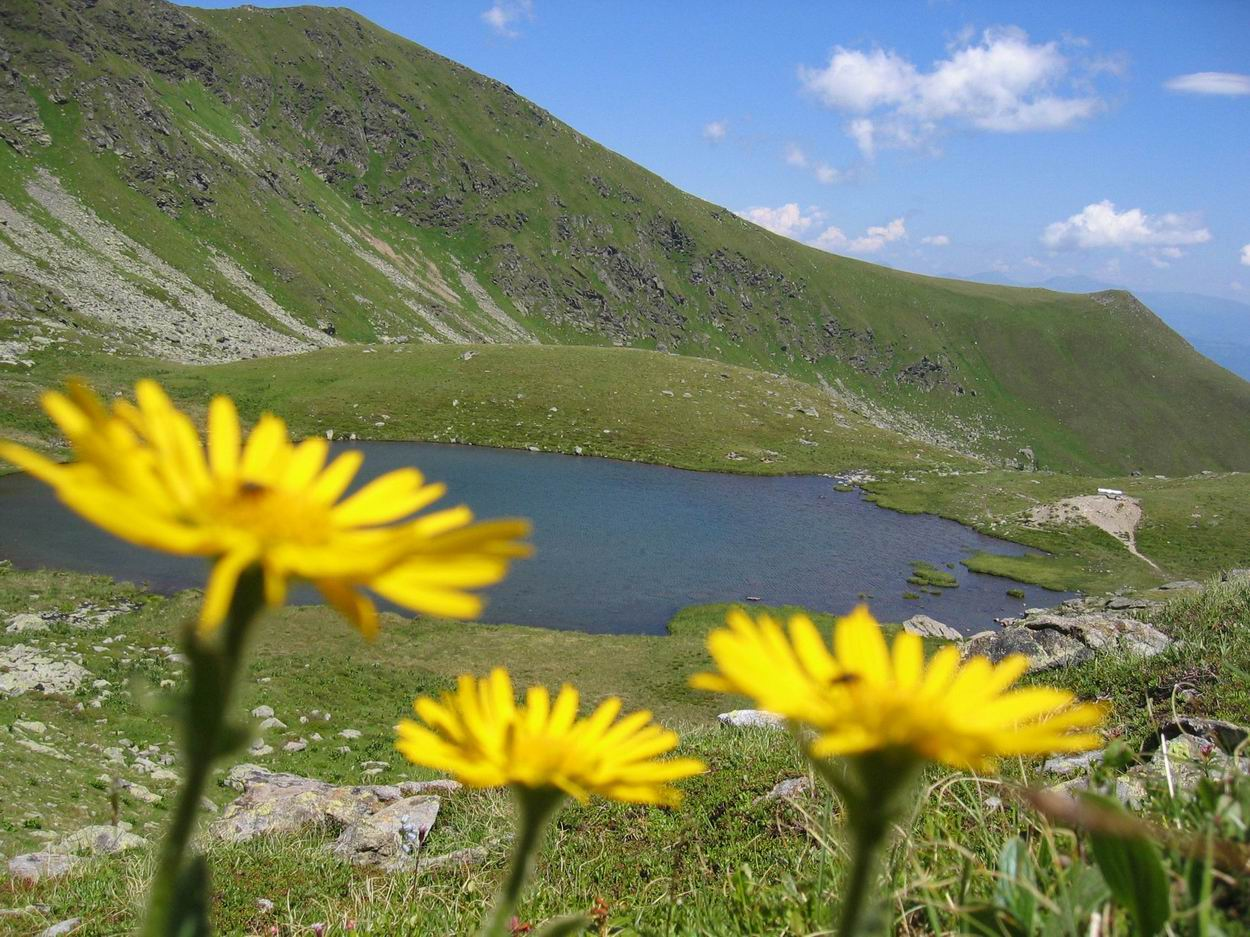
Upper Lindersee lake

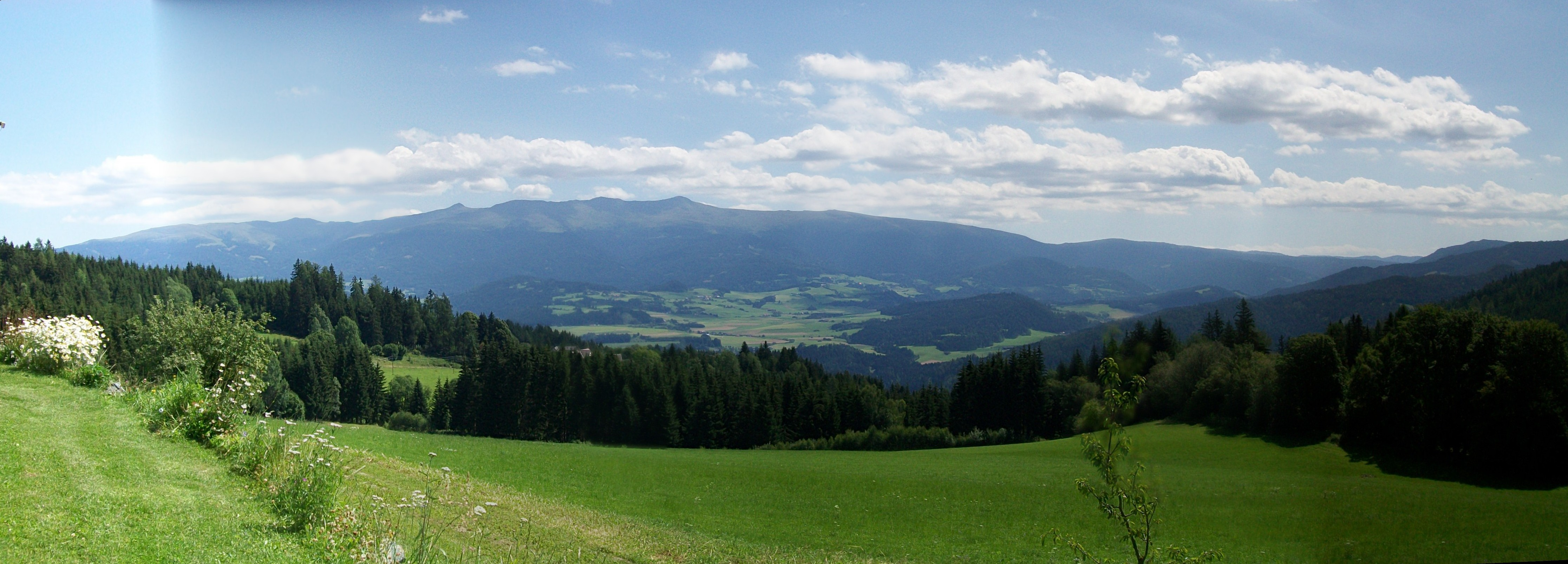
The Zirbitzkogel from the west

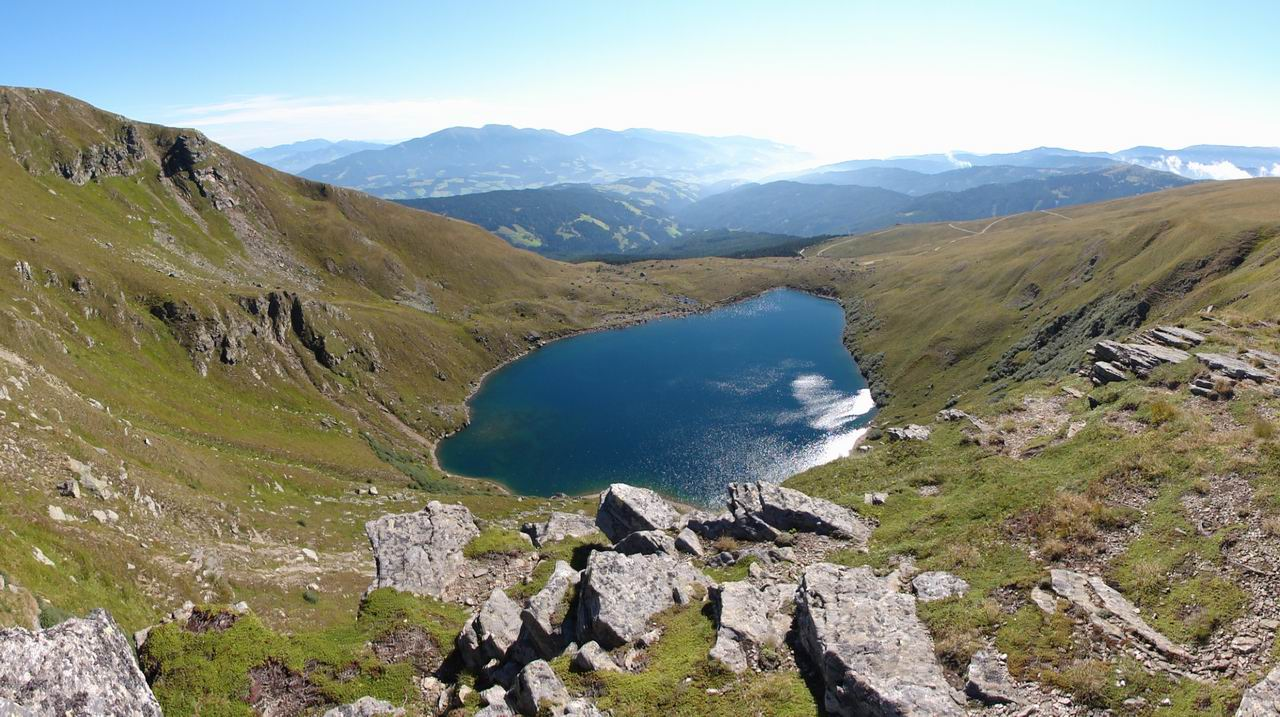
The Wildsee lake

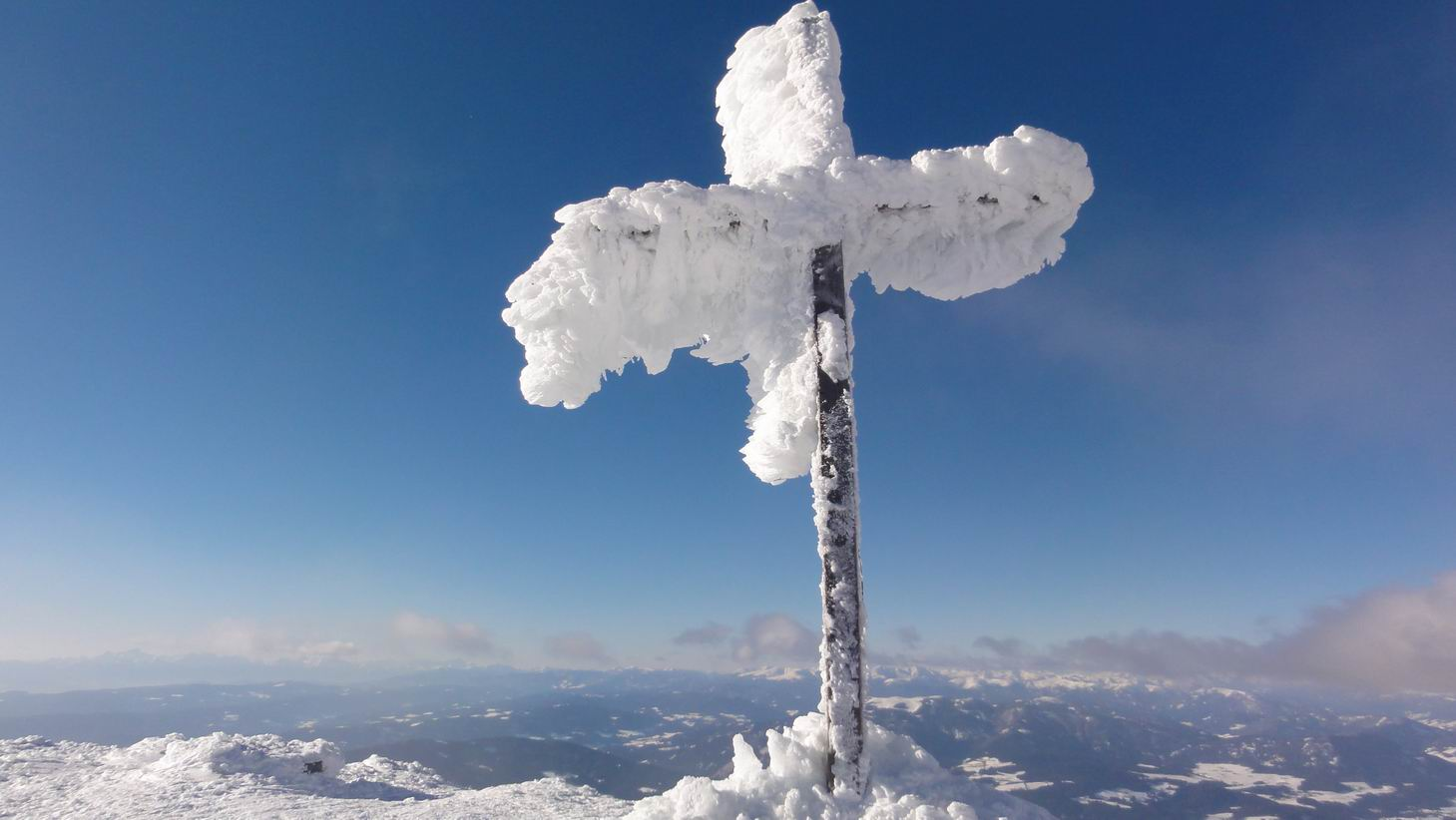
Summit cross in winter

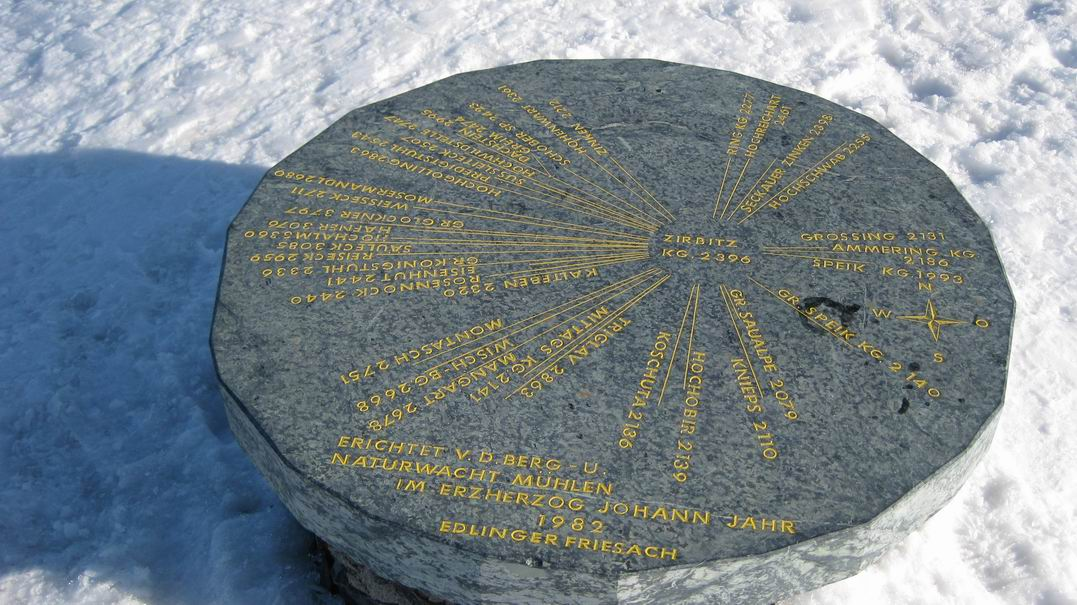
Orientation table at the summit of the Zirbitzkogel
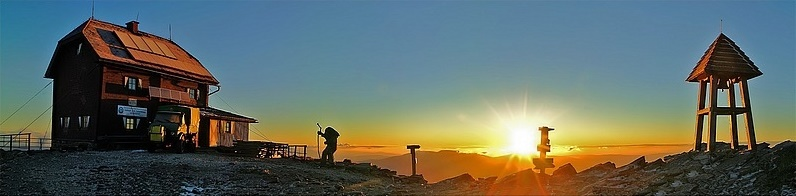
Sunrise at the Zirbitzkogel

== See also ==
- List of Alpine peaks by prominence
