= Sankt Anna am Lavantegg =

- Former municipality
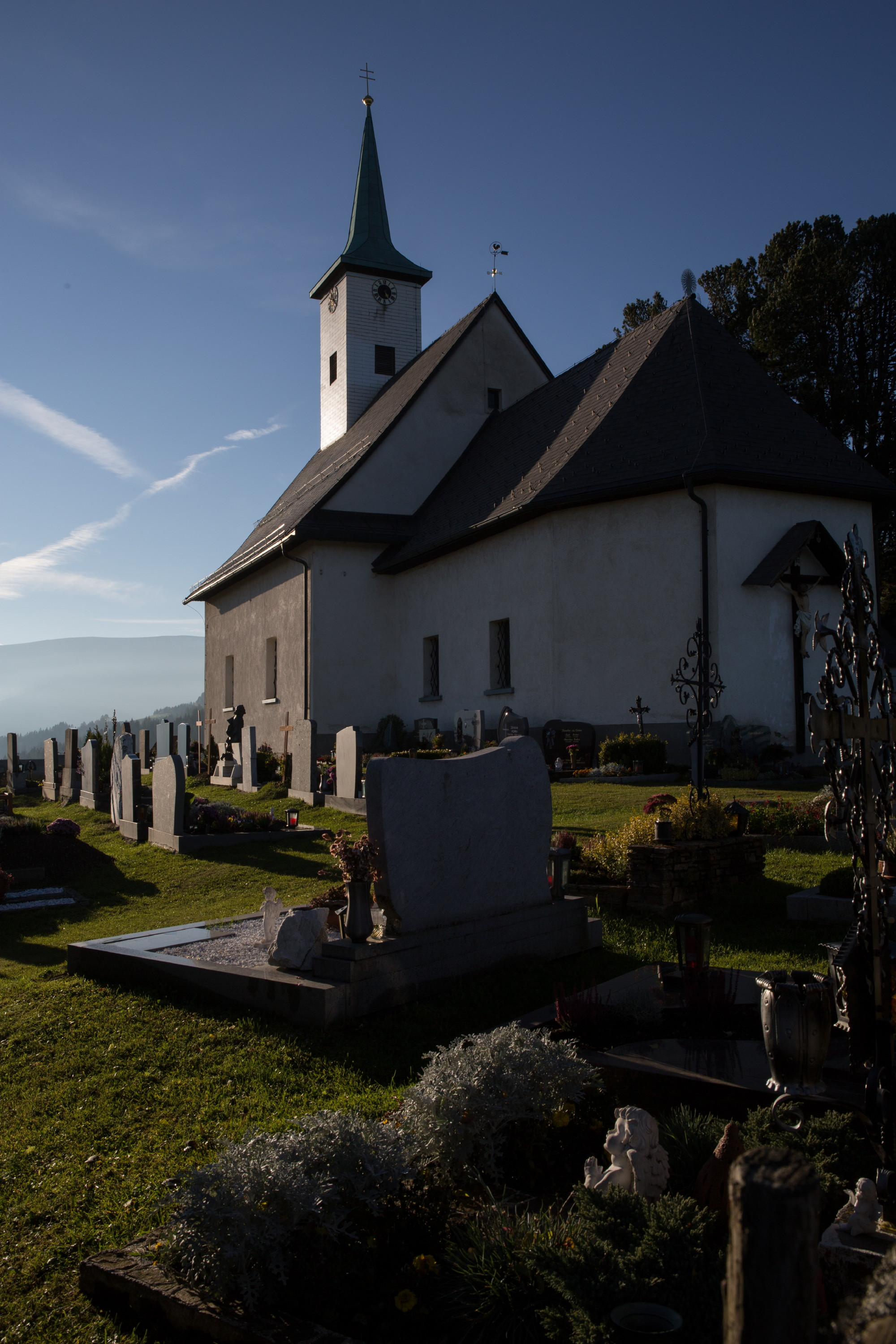
- Sankt Anna am Lavantegg parish church

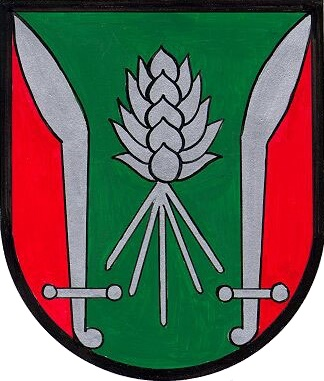
- Coat of arms

- Location within Austria
- Coordinates: 47°02′19″N 14°41′19″E
- Country: Austria
- State: Styria
- District: Murtal

Area
  - Total: 47.16 km^{2} (18.21 sq mi)
- Elevation: 1,291 m (4,236 ft)

Population (1 January 2016)
  - Total: 388
  - Density: 8.23/km^{2} (21.3/sq mi)
- Time zone: UTC+1 (CET)
  - Summer (DST): UTC+2 (CEST)
- Postal code: 8742
- Area code: 03578
- Vehicle registration: JU
- Website: www.st-anna-lavantegg. steiermark.at

Sankt Anna am Lavantegg is a former municipality in the district of Murtal in Styria, Austria. Since the 2015 Styria municipal structural reform, it is part of the municipality Obdach.
