= Gaberl Pass =

Mountain pass in the Austrian Alps

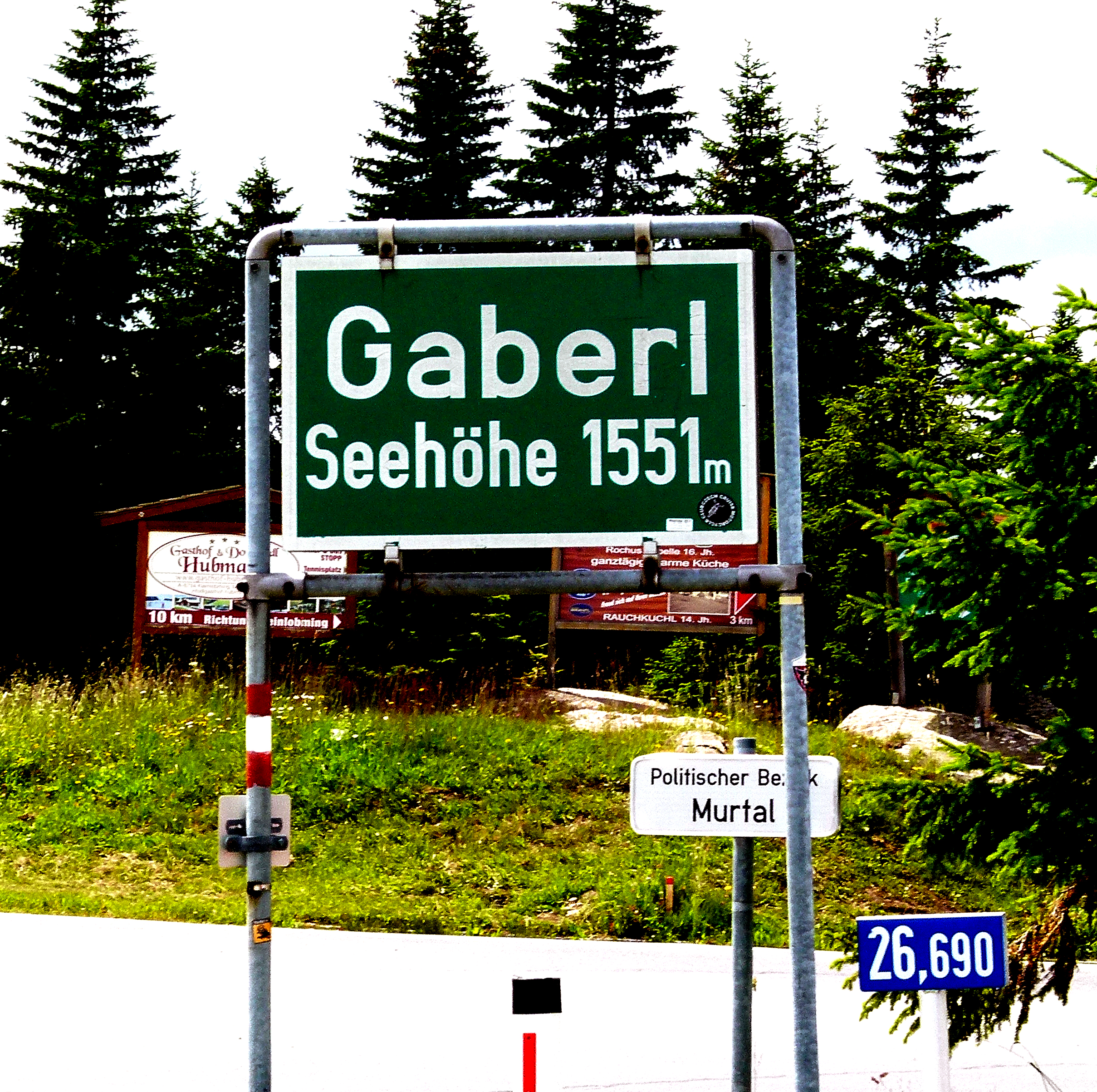
- Summit of the pass

- Location within Alps
- Elevation: 1,551 m (5,089 ft)
- Traversed by: B77

Location
- Location: Austria
- Range: Alps
- Coordinates: 47°06′29″N 14°54′55″E

Gaberl Pass (el. 1,551 m [5,089 ft]) is a high mountain pass in the Austrian Alps in the Bundesland of Styria.

A steep road connects Köflach with the upper Mur River valley, running next to the Stubalpe. This road dates from Roman times.

It is a popular destination for both summer and winter sports.

On a clear day, the views are wide to the Dachstein in the northwest, the Riegersburg in the south and east, and into Hungary and Slovenia.

== See also ==
- List of highest paved roads in Europe
- List of mountain passes
