= Klippitztörl Pass =

Mountain pass in the Austrian Alps

Klippitztörl
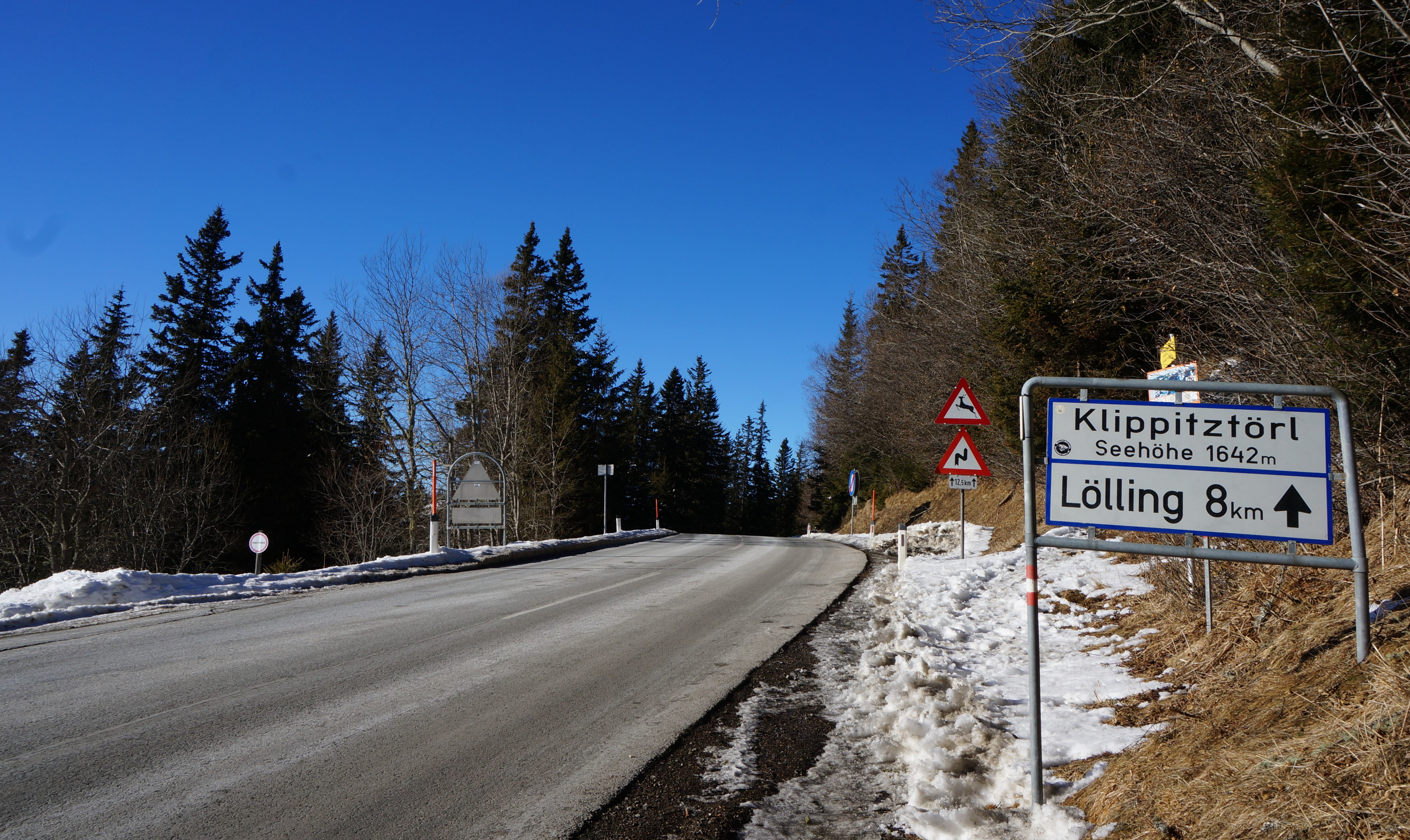
- Summit

- Location within Alps
- Elevation: 1,642 metres (5,387 ft)
- Traversed by: Federal Highway B78

Third Approach
- Location: Austria
- Range: Alps
- Coordinates: 46°56′N 14°40′E

Klippitztörl (el. 1,642 m [5,387 ft]) is a mountain pass in the Austrian Alps in the Bundesland of Kärnten (or Carinthia).

It connects Wolfsberg with St. Veit. The pass road is 28 kilometres (17 mi) and goes south at Bad St. Leonhard from Federal Highway B78 over the pass to Lölling-Graben, where it joins Federal Highway B92 south of Hüttenberg.

There is a ski resort at the Hohenwart, with a number of lifts. Along the road, there are many hotels and rental chalets.

== See also ==
- List of highest paved roads in Europe
- List of mountain passes
