= Obdach Saddle =

Mountain pass in the Austrian Alps

- Obdacher Sattel
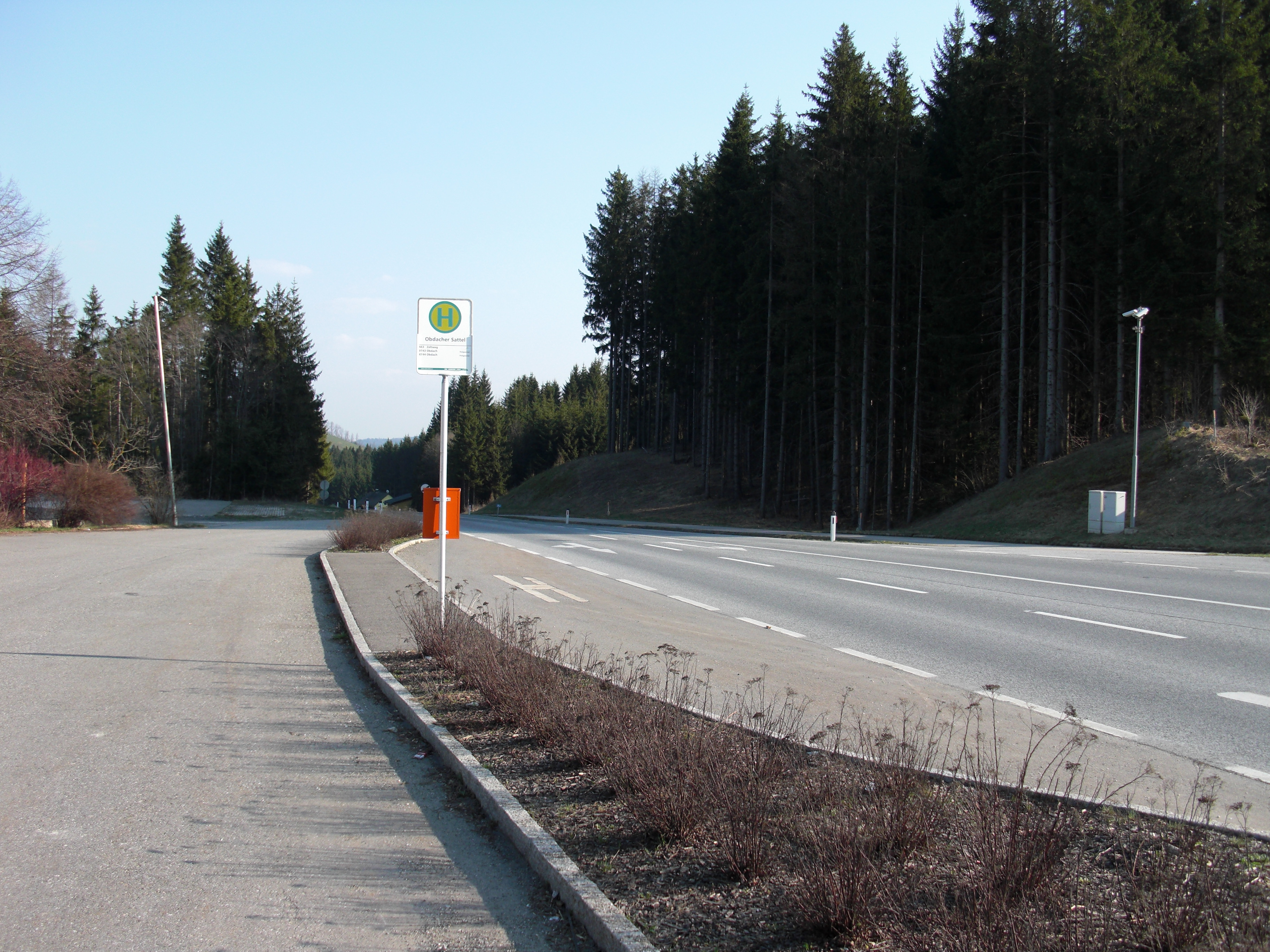
- Bus stop at summit

- Location within Alps
- Elevation: 955 m (3,133 ft)

Location
- Location: Austria
- Range: Alps
- Coordinates: 47°02′42″N 14°43′07″E

The Obdach Saddle (German: Obdacher Sattel) (el. 955 m [3,133 ft]) is a high mountain pass in the Austrian Alps between the Bundesländer of Carinthia and Styria.

== See also ==
- List of highest paved roads in Europe
- List of mountain passes
