= Judenburg District =

Coordinates: 47.191°N 14.650°E

Judenburg District Bezirk Judenburg
- District
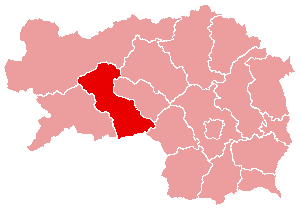
- Judenburg District in Styria
- Country: Austria
- State: Styria
- Number of municipalities: 23

Area
  - Total: 1,097.4 km^{2} (423.7 sq mi)

Population (2001)
  - Total: 48,218
  - Density: 43.938/km^{2} (113.80/sq mi)
- Time zone: UTC+1 (CET)
  - Summer (DST): UTC+2 (CEST)

Bezirk Judenburg was a district of the state of Styria in Austria. On January 1, 2012, Judenburg District and Knittelfeld District were merged to Murtal District.

== Municipalities ==
Suburbs, hamlets and other subdivisions of a municipality are indicated in small characters.

- Amering
  - Großprethal, Kathal in Obdachegg, Kleinprethal, Obdachegg, Sankt Georgen in Obdachegg
- Bretstein
- Eppenstein
  - Mühldorf, Schoberegg, Schwarzenbach am Größing
- Fohnsdorf
  - Aichdorf, Dietersdorf, Hetzendorf, Kumpitz, Rattenberg, Sillweg, Wasendorf
- Hohentauern
  - Triebental
- Judenburg
  - Tiefenbach, Waltersdorf
- Maria Buch-Feistritz
  - Allersdorf, Feistritz, Maria Buch
- Obdach
  - Granitzen, Rötsch, Warbach
- Oberkurzheim
  - Götzendorf, Katzling, Mauterndorf, Mosing, Thaling, Unterzeiring, Winden
- Oberweg
  - Ossach
- Oberzeiring
  - Gföllgraben, Zeiringgraben, Zugtal
- Pöls
  - Allerheiligen, Allerheiligengraben, Enzersdorf, Greith, Gusterheim, Mühltal, Offenburg, Paig, Paßhammer, Pölshof, Sauerbrunn, Thalheim, Thaling
- Pusterwald
- Reifling
  - Auerling, Feeberg
- Reisstraße
  - Kothgraben
- Sankt Anna am Lavantegg
  - Bärnthal, Lavantegg, Sankt Anna-Feriensiedlung, Winterleiten, Zanitzen
- Sankt Georgen ob Judenburg
  - Pichlhofen, Scheiben, Wöll
- Sankt Johann am Tauern
  - Sankt Johann am Tauern Schattseite, Sankt Johann am Tauern Sonnseite
- Sankt Oswald-Möderbrugg
  - Möderbrugg, Sankt Oswald
- Sankt Peter ob Judenburg
  - Feistritzgraben, Furth, Mitterdorf, Möschitzgraben, Pichl, Rach, Rothenthurm
- Sankt Wolfgang-Kienberg
  - Katschwald, Kienberg, Mönchegg
- Unzmarkt-Frauenburg
  - Frauenburg, Unzmarkt
- Weißkirchen in Steiermark
- Zeltweg
  - Farrach
