= Knittelfeld District =

Coordinates: 47.227°N 14.846°E

Knittelfeld District Bezirk Knittelfeld
- District
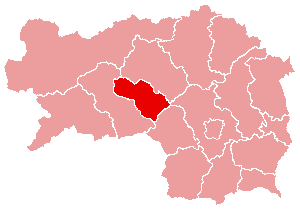
- Knittelfeld District in Styria
- Country: Austria
- State: Styria
- Number of municipalities: 14

Area
  - Total: 578.0 km^{2} (223.2 sq mi)

Population (2001)
  - Total: 29,661
  - Density: 51.32/km^{2} (132.9/sq mi)
- Time zone: UTC+1 (CET)
  - Summer (DST): UTC+2 (CEST)

Knittelfeld District (German: Bezirk Knittelfeld) was a political district of the Austrian state of Styria. Its administrative seat was Knittelfeld, a town on the Mur in Upper Styria. The district covered the eastern part of the present-day Murtal District, including parts of the Aichfeld basin and the surrounding mountain and valley areas.

Before its dissolution, the district comprised 14 municipalities, including the towns of Knittelfeld and Spielberg and the market towns of Kobenz and Seckau. In 2011, it had an area of 578.11 km^{2} (223.21 sq mi) and a population of 29,215.

On 1 January 2012, Knittelfeld District was merged with Judenburg District to form the new Murtal District. The new district was assigned the district code 620 by Statistics Austria. The merger was part of a wider administrative reform in Styria, which also included later district mergers and municipal amalgamations.

The former district lay in an Alpine region shaped by the Mur valley and the broader Aichfeld–Murboden settlement area. The surrounding landscape includes mountain ranges such as the Seckau Tauern to the north and the Gleinalpe and Seetal Alps to the south and west.

== Municipalities ==
Towns (Städte) are indicated in boldface; market towns (Marktgemeinden) in italics; suburbs, hamlets and other subdivisions of a municipality are indicated in small characters.

- Apfelberg
  - Landschach
- Feistritz bei Knittelfeld
  - Altendorf, Moos
- Flatschach
- Gaal
  - Bischoffeld, Gaalgraben, Graden, Ingering II, Puchschachen, Schattenberg
- Großlobming
- Kleinlobming
  - Mitterlobming
- **Knittelfeld**
- Kobenz
  - Hautzenbichl, Neuhautzenbichl, Oberfarrach, Raßnitz, Reifersdorf, Unterfarrach
- Rachau
  - Glein, Mitterbach
- Sankt Lorenzen bei Knittelfeld
  - Fötschach, Gottsbach, Leistach, Pichl, Preg, Preggraben, Ritzendorf, Sankt Benedikten, Schütt, Untermur
- Sankt Marein bei Knittelfeld
  - Feistritzgraben, Fentsch, Fressenberg, Greith, Hof, Laas, Mitterfeld, Prankh, Sankt Martha, Wasserleith, Kniepaß
- Sankt Margarethen bei Knittelfeld
  - Gobernitz, Kroisbach, Obermur, Ugendorf
- Seckau
  - Dürnberg, Seckau, Neuhofen, Sonnwenddorf
- **Spielberg**
  - Einhörn, Ingering I, Laing, Lind, Maßweg, Pausendorf, Sachendorf, Schönberg, Spielberg, Weyern
