= Maria Cäsar =

Austrian political activist (1920–2017)

Maria Cäsar (born Maria Kreith: 13 September 1920 – 1 September 2017) was an Austrian political activist (KPÖ) who after the Anschluss in 1938 became a resistance activist. She was among the survivors: during and beyond the occupation years. After the second World War Maria Cäsar played her part in testifying about her experiences of Austria under National Socialism to younger generations.

== Life ==
Maria Kreith was born in Liescha (Prävali) in the Mieß valley district of what was still, at the time of her birth, part of the German speaking province of Carinthia. She was, however, born at the height of the post-war ethnic conflict in the area. Under the terms of the Treaty of Saint-Germain which the wartime victors imposed on the former Austrian empire a referendum was held in the southern borderlands of Carinthia, including the Kreiths' home village, as a result of which when Maria Kreith was approximately four weeks old the area became part of the Kingdom of Yugoslavia. Recent events had inflamed inter-ethnic tensions. In order to remain in German speaking Austria the family relocated to Judenburg in Upper Styria. Her father found work with the local crucible steel plant, although sources recall that during the economically parlous 1920s and 1930s he also experienced frequent periods of unemployment. During the Great Depression's unemployment crisis that followed the Wall Street crash her mother kept the family afloat by working as a farm labourer.

The Kreiths backed the Social Democratic Party. As the country transferred to one-party dictatorship, the party was suppressed in the aftermath of the brief but savage uprising of February 1934. As a younger teenager Maria Kreith was a member of the left-wing Rote Falken sports and social youth association. After 1934 she joined the Young Communists and undertook what now constituted "underground illegal political work", which included distributing banned political leaflets on behalf of the party. Four years later she was still only 18 when she joined an anti-government resistance group. In 1939 the group was discovered by the authorities. On 23 May of that year she was arrested on suspicion of "preparing high treason" and detained in investigatory detention at the Graz regional court for the next fourteen months.

Directly following her release she married Franz Greilberger, her first husband who, like her, was a member of a resistance group. Their son Heinz was born in 1941. In 1943, Greilberger was killed on the Russian front. As the Second World War continued she now established contacts with the Yugoslav Partisans across the pre-1941 border to the south, and with resistance groups in Judenburg. Sources recall that she repeatedly risked her life in the fight against fascism. During 1944 many resistance activists in Judenburg were arrested. One fellow combatant to whom she was close was executed. In order to avoid a similar fate, shortly before the war ended she went into hiding with Slovene relatives.

Maria Cäsar's speech to the newly elected Graz Gemeinderat (city council) was well received and, in some quarters, well remembered:

- "We also have to bear in mind that Austria had been wiped out. Austria was no longer recognized as Austria, but had been redefined as the 'Ostmark', part of Germany. .... But I also recall that there was [always] another Austria, that said 'no' to all that, 'no to National Socialism', another Austria that encouraged resistance".
- "Wir erinnern uns auch daran, dass Österreich ausgelöscht worden ist, Österreich wurde nicht mehr als Österreich anerkannt, sondern Österreich wurde zur Ostmark erklärt, ein Teil Deutschlands. […] Ich erinnere aber auch daran, dass es ein anderes Österreich gegeben hat, ein anderes Österreich, das nein dazu gesagt hat, nein zum Nationalsozialismus, ein anderes Österreich, das die Menschen aufgemuntert hat, auch Widerstand zu leisten."
  Maria Cäsar, 17 March 2008

Ernst, her second son, was born in 1949. In 1950 Maria Kreith relocated with her sons from Judenburg to the regional capital Graz where as an unmarried mother she now lived with her sons in basic accommodation in the city's quarter Lendviertel. The entire southern portion of what before 1938 had been Austria, had been administered, more recently, as the British occupation zone since 1945. In the 1945 general election the Communist Party had secured more than 5% of the national vote, and it was as a communist than Maria Kreith now re-engaged politically. It was also through the party that she met the man who subsequently became her second husband. She worked with the Austrian Red Aid (a [communist backed] welfare organisation) and was actively engaged with the KZ-Verband, an Austrian Concentration Camp Survivors' Association, and, later, in the emerging women's movement. Even while Soviet-style Communism became increasingly identified, in central Europe, as a proxy for old-fashioned Russian expansionism, she remained an unapologetic backer of communist politics.

Later, as a contemporary eyewitness of the Nazi nightmare, Maria Cäsar did what she could to pass on her experiences, especially to younger generations, delivering lectures and presentations at schools and other education institutions, in order "to counsel and to warn in ways that could prevent [such repeat of that] deathly development". (Note: "... zu warnen und zu mahnen, um eine verhängnisvolle Entwicklung zu verhindern".) As memories of National Socialism receded and her own family responsibilities made fewer calls on her time, the extent of her public mission grew. Over time she received a number of public honours for these activities. For many years she was chair of the KZ-Verband for Styria. In 2008, a couple of years short of her ninetieth birthday, she accepted an invitation to address the newly elected Graz Gemeinderat. Her thought-provoking speech, delivered on 17 March 2008, was well received: the incident was recalled nine years later when, shortly after her death, the council renamed a children's play park Maria-Cäsar-Park in the city's Liebenau quarter.

Maria Cäsar died in Graz on 1 September 2017 shortly before what would have been her 97th birthday.
