= Zeltweg =

- Municipality
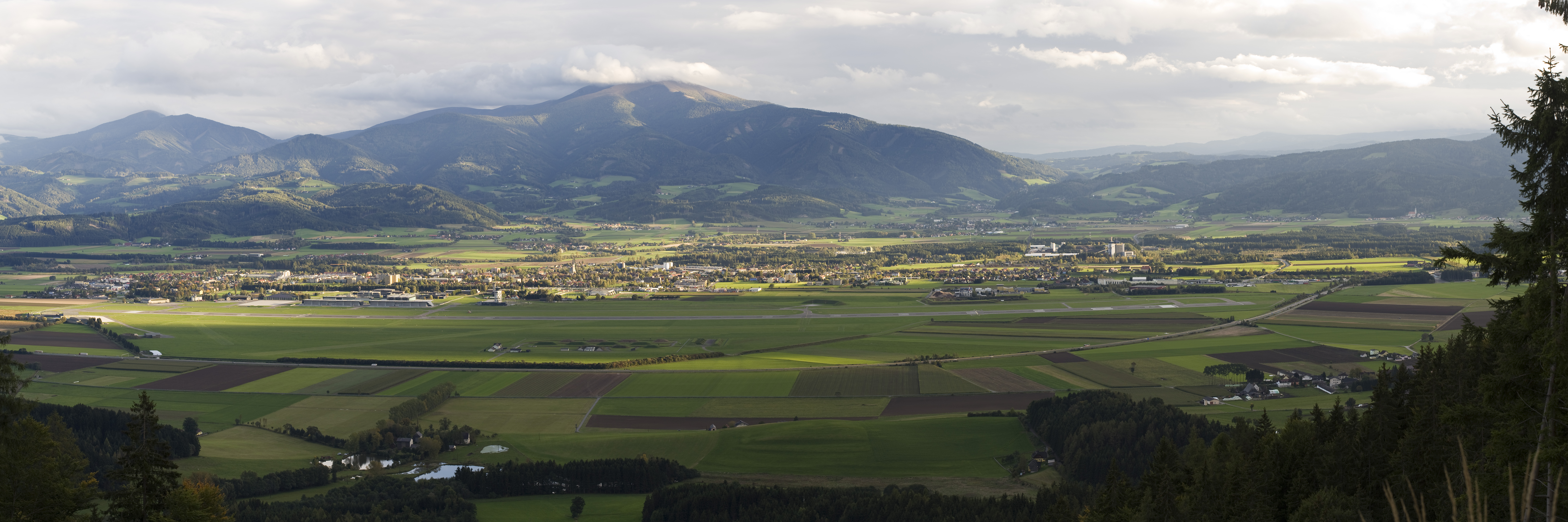
- View from the north

- Coat of arms

- Location within Austria
- Coordinates: 47°11′26″N 14°45′04″E
- Country: Austria
- State: Styria
- District: Murtal

Government
  - Mayor: Günter Reichhold (SPÖ)

Area
  - Total: 8.67 km^{2} (3.35 sq mi)
- Elevation: 659 m (2,162 ft)

Population (2018-01-01)
  - Total: 7,212
  - Density: 832/km^{2} (2,150/sq mi)
- Time zone: UTC+1 (CET)
  - Summer (DST): UTC+2 (CEST)
- Postal code: 8740
- Area code: 03577
- Vehicle registration: JU
- Website: www.zeltweg.at

Zeltweg (German: [ˈt͡sɛltˌveːk]) is a town in Styria, Austria. It is located in the Aichfeld basin of the Mur River in Upper Styria. Larger municipalities in the vicinity are Judenburg, Knittelfeld and Fohnsdorf.

== History ==
Some farms were recorded at Zeltweg in the Duchy of Styria already during the 13th century. The village then was called Celtwich, its name is recorded in 1430 for the first time. During the 15th century, there were considerable difficulties resulting from famines, failed harvests, and epidemics, From 1569 onwards, the Habsburg archduke Charles II of Austria initiated the rafting of timber down the Mur, which gained considerable importance for Zeltweg's history. During the following decades, Zeltweg grew and was a target of migration.

During the 18th century, the population shrank considerably because of the expansion of roads. In 1848, Count Hugo Henckel von Donnersmarck, who came from Upper Silesia, decided to relocate his family's smeltery from Carinthian Frantschach-Sankt Gertraud to the site. This Industrial Revolution brought a boom for Zeltweg. A railway station was built in 1868. Zeltweg was detached from neighboring Fohnsdorf as a municipality in its own right and the first mayor, Heinrich Dillinger, was elected in 1875.

After the Austrian Anschluss in 1938, the Zeltweg ironworks were incorporated into the Reichswerke Hermann Göring conglomerate, employing numerous unfree labourers during World War II. At the end of the war, Zeltweg was first occupied by Soviet and then British troops. Still, there was an upswing both in education and in the industry after the war. Zeltweg received town privileges on 1 January 1966.

== Main sights ==
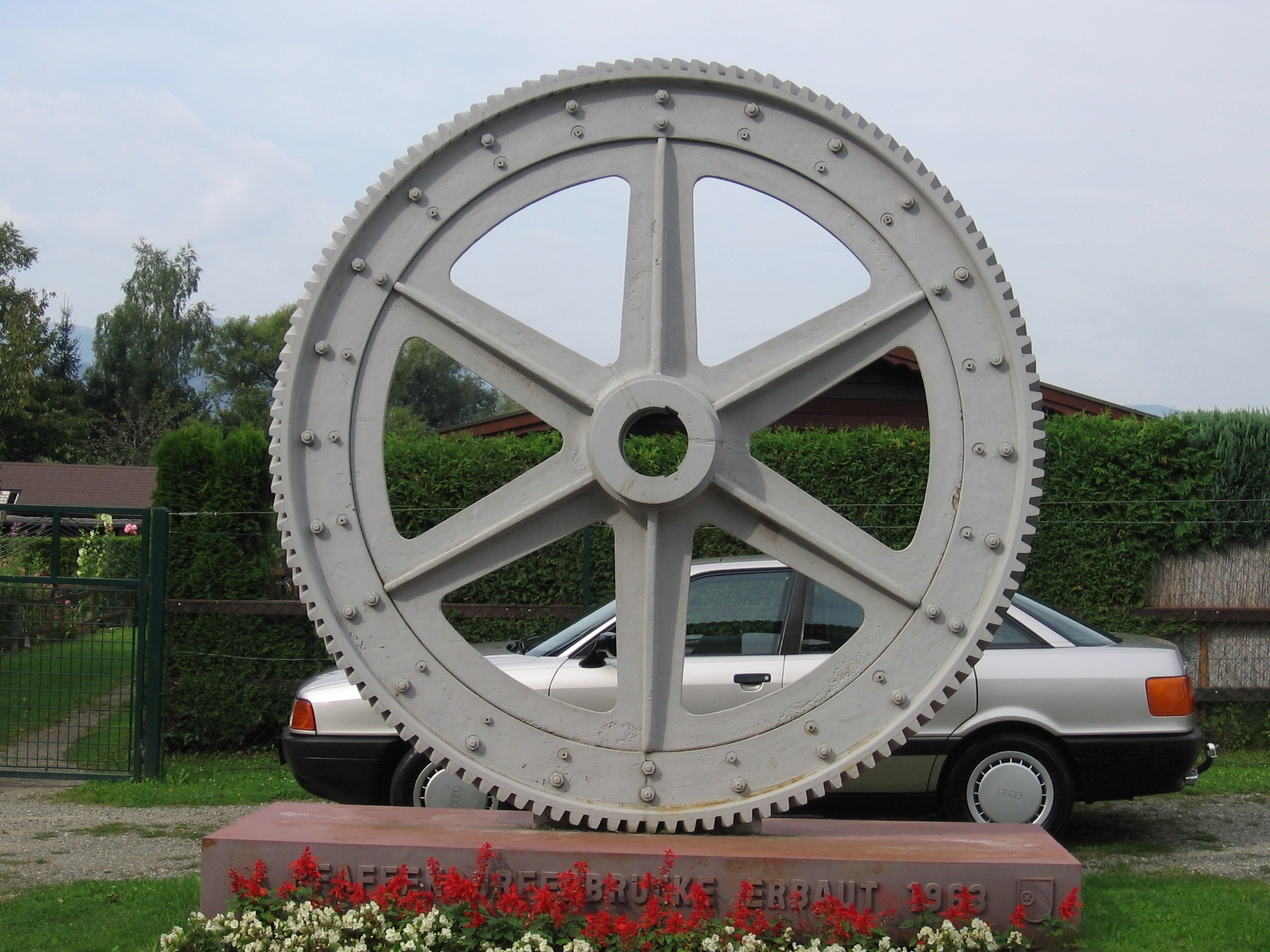
Zeltweg gearwheel

Zeltweg's main attraction is the Farrach Palace, built by Carl Friedrich von Teufenbach between 1670 and 1680 in the style of an Italian Renaissance palace. Stucco works were installed inside.

Since 1986, the palace has been owned by Anton and Ingrid Hartleb, who refurbished it and transformed it into a site for cultural and artistic events.

Zeltweg's coat of arms is a cog and a human-sized one was erected at the railway bridge to show that Zeltweg was an industrial town.

== Notable people ==
- Franz Böhme (1885–1947), an Army officer who served in succession with the Austro-Hungarian Army, the Austrian Army and the German Wehrmacht.
- Friedrich Stadler (born 1951), an Austrian historian and philosopher at the University of Vienna
- Deni Alar (born 1990), an Austrian footballer of Croatian descent who has played over 360 games

== Climate ==
Climate data for Zeltweg (1971–2000)
Month	Jan	Feb	Mar	Apr	May	Jun	Jul	Aug	Sep	Oct	Nov	Dec	Year
Record high °C (°F)	12.2 (54.0)	17.8 (64.0)	22.7 (72.9)	25.5 (77.9)	29.1 (84.4)	32.6 (90.7)	36.2 (97.2)	33.6 (92.5)	30.6 (87.1)	24.8 (76.6)	20.3 (68.5)	17.2 (63.0)	36.2 (97.2)
Mean daily maximum °C (°F)	0.8 (33.4)	4.2 (39.6)	9.3 (48.7)	13.4 (56.1)	18.6 (65.5)	21.7 (71.1)	23.9 (75.0)	23.6 (74.5)	19.8 (67.6)	14.1 (57.4)	6.5 (43.7)	1.4 (34.5)	13.1 (55.6)
Daily mean °C (°F)	−4.8 (23.4)	−2.1 (28.2)	2.5 (36.5)	6.7 (44.1)	11.9 (53.4)	15.0 (59.0)	16.9 (62.4)	16.4 (61.5)	12.5 (54.5)	7.1 (44.8)	1.0 (33.8)	−3.4 (25.9)	6.6 (43.9)
Mean daily minimum °C (°F)	−9.2 (15.4)	−6.7 (19.9)	−2.4 (27.7)	1.1 (34.0)	5.7 (42.3)	9.1 (48.4)	10.9 (51.6)	10.7 (51.3)	7.1 (44.8)	2.5 (36.5)	−2.8 (27.0)	−7.0 (19.4)	1.6 (34.9)
Record low °C (°F)	−29.8 (−21.6)	−28.5 (−19.3)	−25.3 (−13.5)	−7.8 (18.0)	−13.6 (7.5)	−0.4 (31.3)	2.3 (36.1)	0.4 (32.7)	−4.4 (24.1)	−11.1 (12.0)	−19.8 (−3.6)	−26.4 (−15.5)	−29.8 (−21.6)
Average precipitation mm (inches)	26.5 (1.04)	26.9 (1.06)	39.5 (1.56)	51.6 (2.03)	78.8 (3.10)	116.2 (4.57)	124.4 (4.90)	109.1 (4.30)	82.0 (3.23)	63.4 (2.50)	48.0 (1.89)	33.1 (1.30)	799.5 (31.48)
Average snowfall cm (inches)	14.3 (5.6)	16.8 (6.6)	12.7 (5.0)	8.5 (3.3)	0.8 (0.3)	0.0 (0.0)	0.0 (0.0)	0.0 (0.0)	0.0 (0.0)	0.4 (0.2)	7.5 (3.0)	14.0 (5.5)	75.0 (29.5)
Average precipitation days (≥ 1.0 mm)	5.1	4.5	6.1	7.8	10.0	11.9	11.2	11.2	8.0	6.5	6.6	5.6	94.5
Average snowy days (≥ 1.0 cm)	24.1	16.7	9.1	1.9	0.2	0.0	0.0	0.0	0.0	0.2	6.3	17.9	76.4
Mean monthly sunshine hours	103.0	127.5	144.3	157.9	189.3	191.0	213.5	205.3	160.5	130.4	91.9	74.0	1,788.6
Source: Central Institute for Meteorology and Geodynamics

== Economy ==
The most important industries are mechanical engineering, the packaging industry, and timber. Furthermore, Austria's largest military airport, Zeltweg Airfield (Fliegerhorst Hinterstoisser) operated by the Austrian Air Force is located here, which was built in 1937.

== Motorsport ==
The Zeltweg Airfield was used as a racing circuit in the 1960s and hosted the Formula One Grand Prix in 1964. The track was abandoned in 1969 with the construction of the Österreichring, a purpose-built motorsport track in the neighbouring Spielberg.

== Transportation ==
The center of Zeltweg was strongly polluted by truck traffic, as a large proportion of the traffic coming from Wolfsberg and Obdach (including logwood, hacked wood, and packaged goods) had to be brought through the town. For that reason, a by-pass was built and opened on 3 November 2004. The expressway is 4.5 km long, costs €11 million, and also saves Judenburg and Fisching from traffic.

== Education ==
In Zeltweg, there are, among others, two elementary schools, one Hauptschule (junior high school) (the two Hauptschulen were merged in 2002), and a vocational high school machine construction and building.

== AC/DC-Rock or Bust World Tour ==
On 14 May 2015, Zeltweg hosted one of the biggest rock bands in the world, AC/DC, on their Rock or Bust World Tour. It was the largest concert ever in Austria, with an audience of 105,042 people.
