= Maria Buch-Feistritz =

- Former municipality
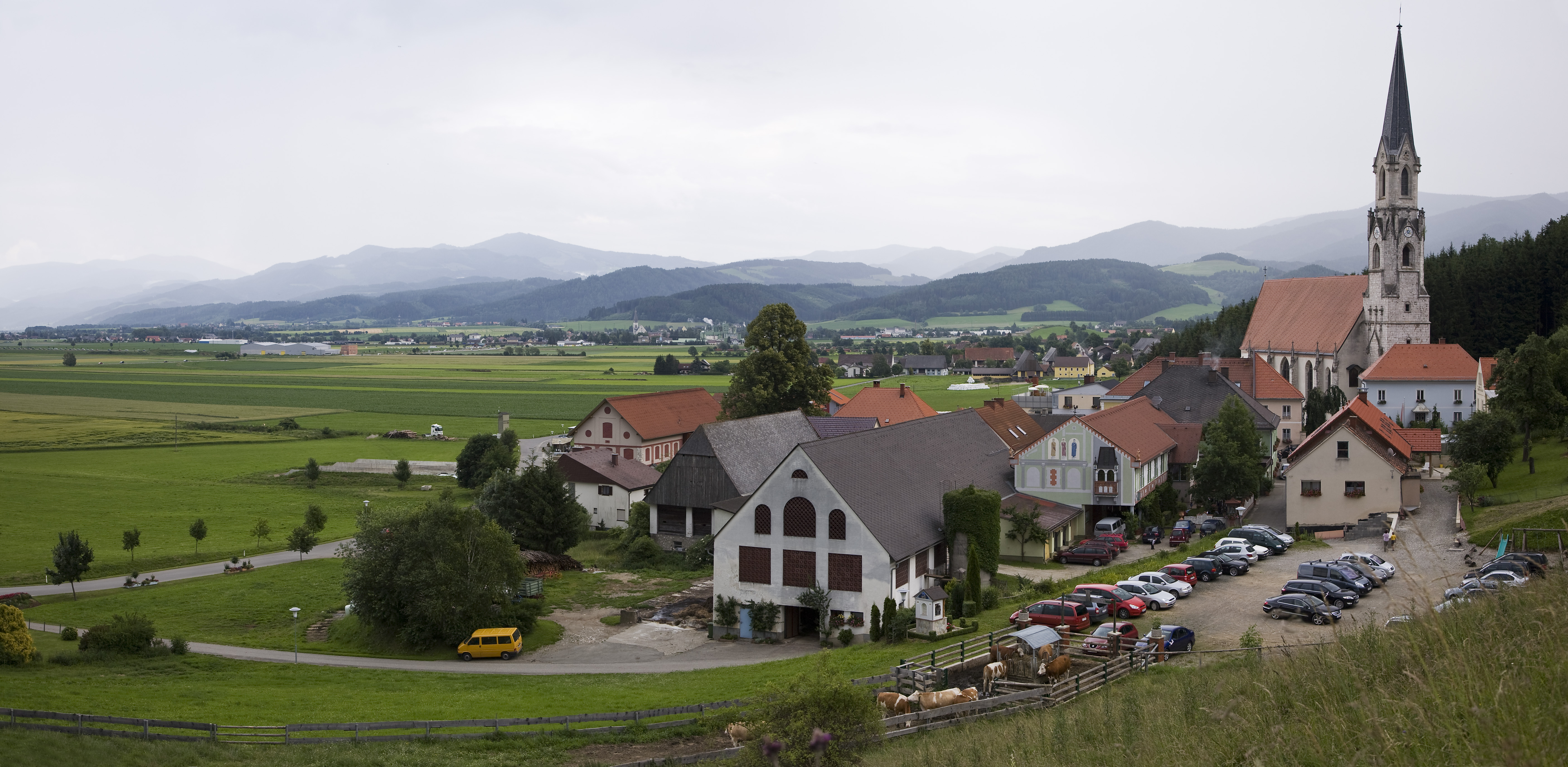
- View of Maria Buch

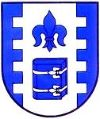
- Coat of arms

- Location within Austria
- Coordinates: 47°09′15″N 14°42′26″E
- Country: Austria
- State: Styria
- District: Murtal

Area
  - Total: 28.47 km^{2} (10.99 sq mi)
- Elevation: 660 m (2,170 ft)

Population (1 January 2016)
  - Total: 2,244
  - Density: 78.82/km^{2} (204.1/sq mi)
- Time zone: UTC+1 (CET)
  - Summer (DST): UTC+2 (CEST)
- Postal code: 8740, 8741, 8750
- Area code: 03577
- Vehicle registration: JU
- Website: www.maria-buch-feistritz.at

Maria Buch-Feistritz is a former municipality in the district of Murtal in Styria, Austria. Since the 2015 Styria municipal structural reform, it is part of the municipality Weißkirchen in Steiermark.
