= Reisstraße =

- Former municipality
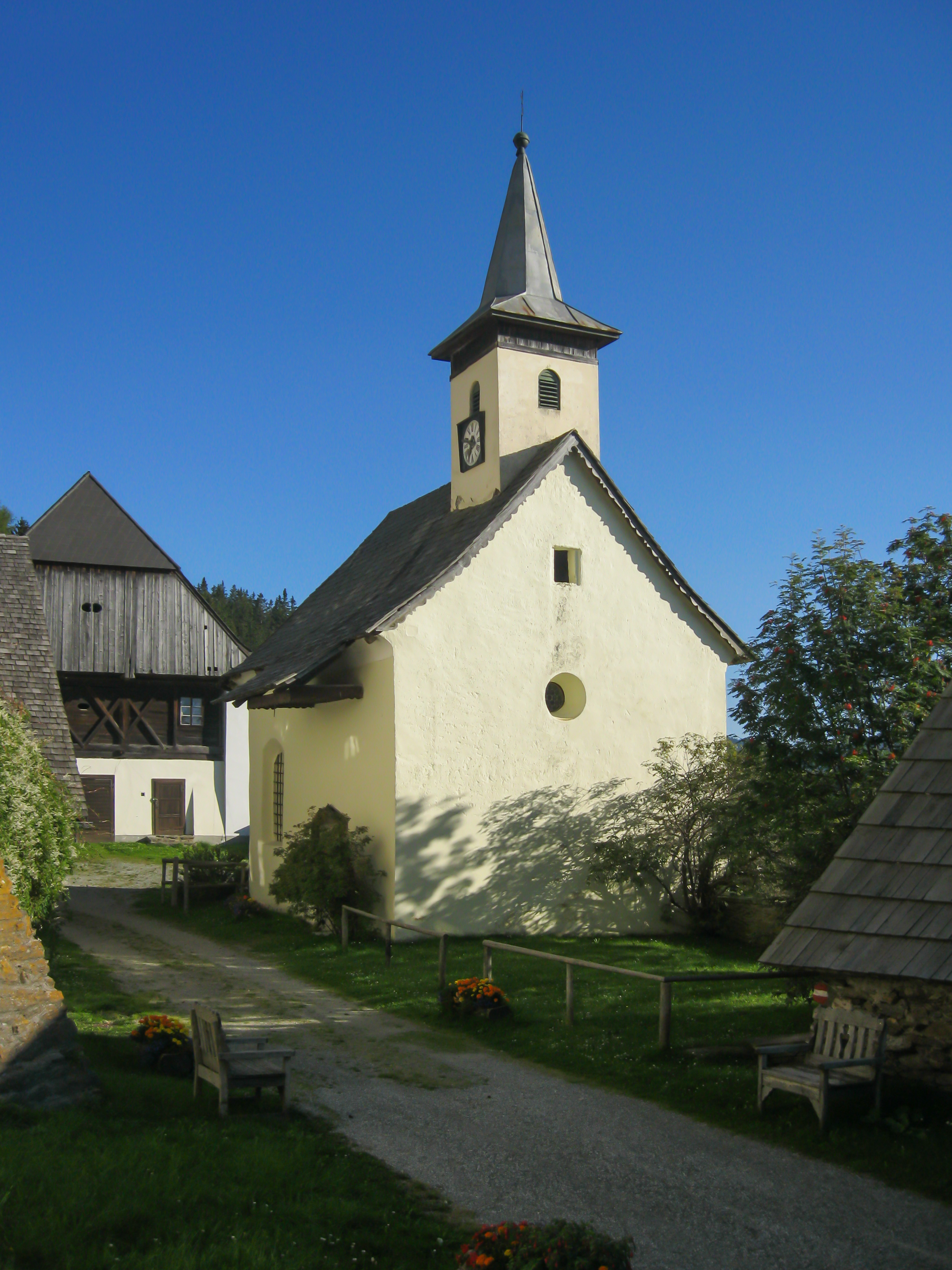
- Chapel in Reisstraße

- Location within Austria
- Coordinates: 47°08′05″N 14°49′47″E
- Country: Austria
- State: Styria
- District: Murtal

Area
  - Total: 62.28 km^{2} (24.05 sq mi)
- Elevation: 842 m (2,762 ft)

Population (1 January 2016)
  - Total: 167
  - Density: 2.68/km^{2} (6.94/sq mi)
- Time zone: UTC+1 (CET)
  - Summer (DST): UTC+2 (CEST)
- Postal code: 8741
- Area code: 03516
- Vehicle registration: JU
- Website: www.reisstraße. steiermark.at

Reisstraße is a former municipality in the district of Murtal in Styria, Austria. Since the 2015 Styria municipal structural reform, it is part of the municipality Weißkirchen in Steiermark.
