= 2012 Graz local election =

Election in Styria, Austria

Local elections were held in Graz on 25 November 2012. In addition to the People's Party, the Communists, the Social democrats, the Freedom Party and the Greens also the Pirates got seats in the municipal council. The Alliance for the Future of Austria lost its 2 seats from 2008.

Party	Votes in %	Seats
Austrian People's Party (ÖVP)	33.74%	17
Communist Party of Austria (KPÖ)	19.86%	10
Social Democratic Party of Austria (SPÖ)	15.31%	7
Freedom Party of Austria (FPÖ)	13.75%	7
The Greens – The Green Alternative (GRÜNE)	12.14%	6
Pirate Party of Austria (PPÖ)	2.70%	1
Alliance for the Future of Austria (BZÖ)	1.34%	0
Others	1.17%	0

Source: http://www.graz.at/cms/ziel/4787925/DE/

Popular Vote
ÖVP	33.74%
KPÖ	19.86%
SPÖ	15.31%
FPÖ	13.75%
GRÜNE	12.14%
PPÖ	2.70%
BZÖ	1.34%
Other	1.17%
