= Reifling =

- Former municipality
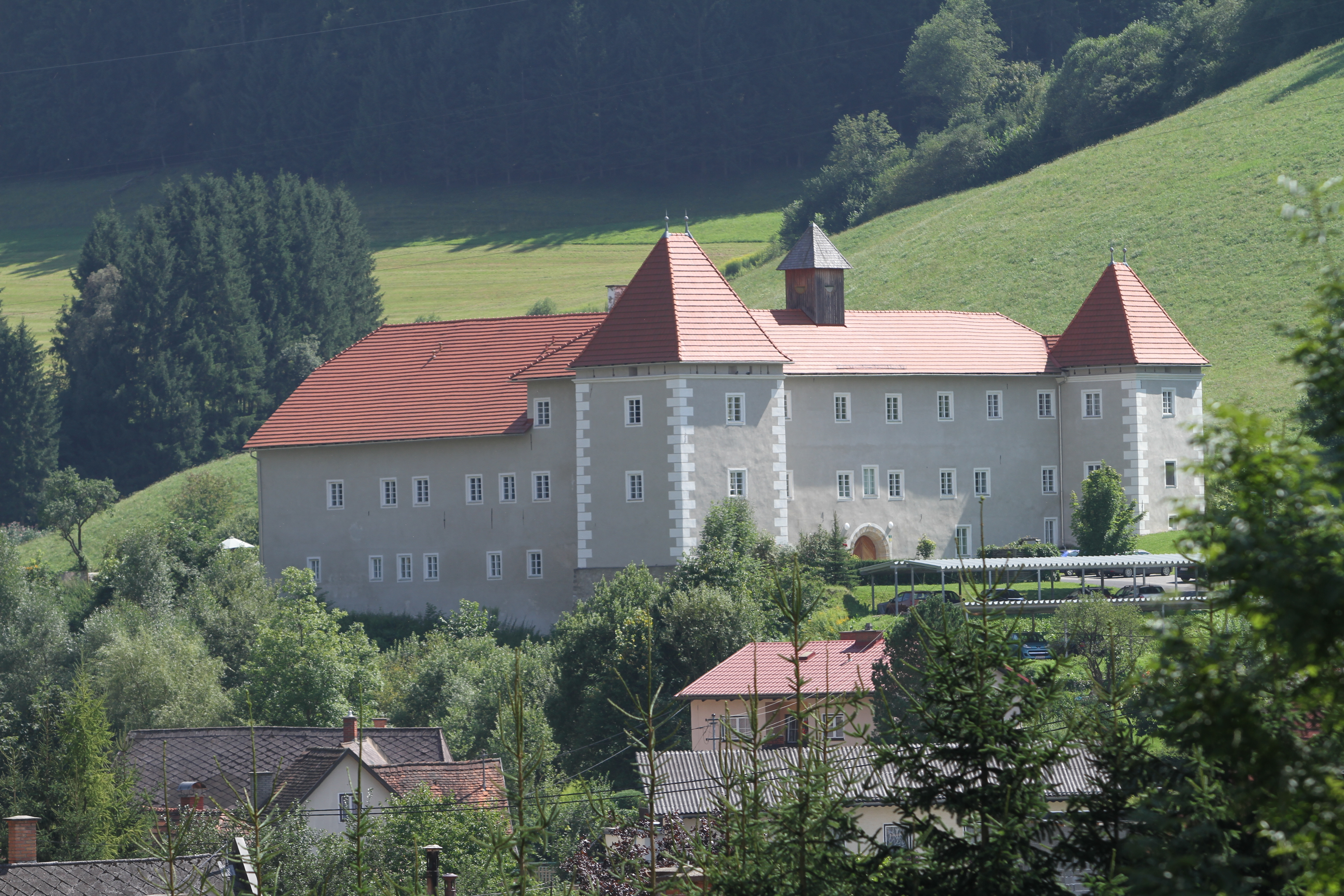
- Weyer Castle in Reifling

- Location within Austria
- Coordinates: 47°09′00″N 14°41′00″E
- Country: Austria
- State: Styria
- District: Murtal

Area
  - Total: 16.22 km^{2} (6.26 sq mi)
- Elevation: 815 m (2,674 ft)

Population (1 January 2016)
  - Total: 376
  - Density: 23.2/km^{2} (60.0/sq mi)
- Time zone: UTC+1 (CET)
  - Summer (DST): UTC+2 (CEST)
- Postal code: 8750
- Area code: 03572
- Vehicle registration: JU
- Website: www.reifling.steiermark.at

Reifling is a former municipality in the district of Murtal in Styria, Austria. Since the 2015 Styria municipal structural reform, it is part of the municipality Judenburg.
