= Apfelberg =

- Former municipality
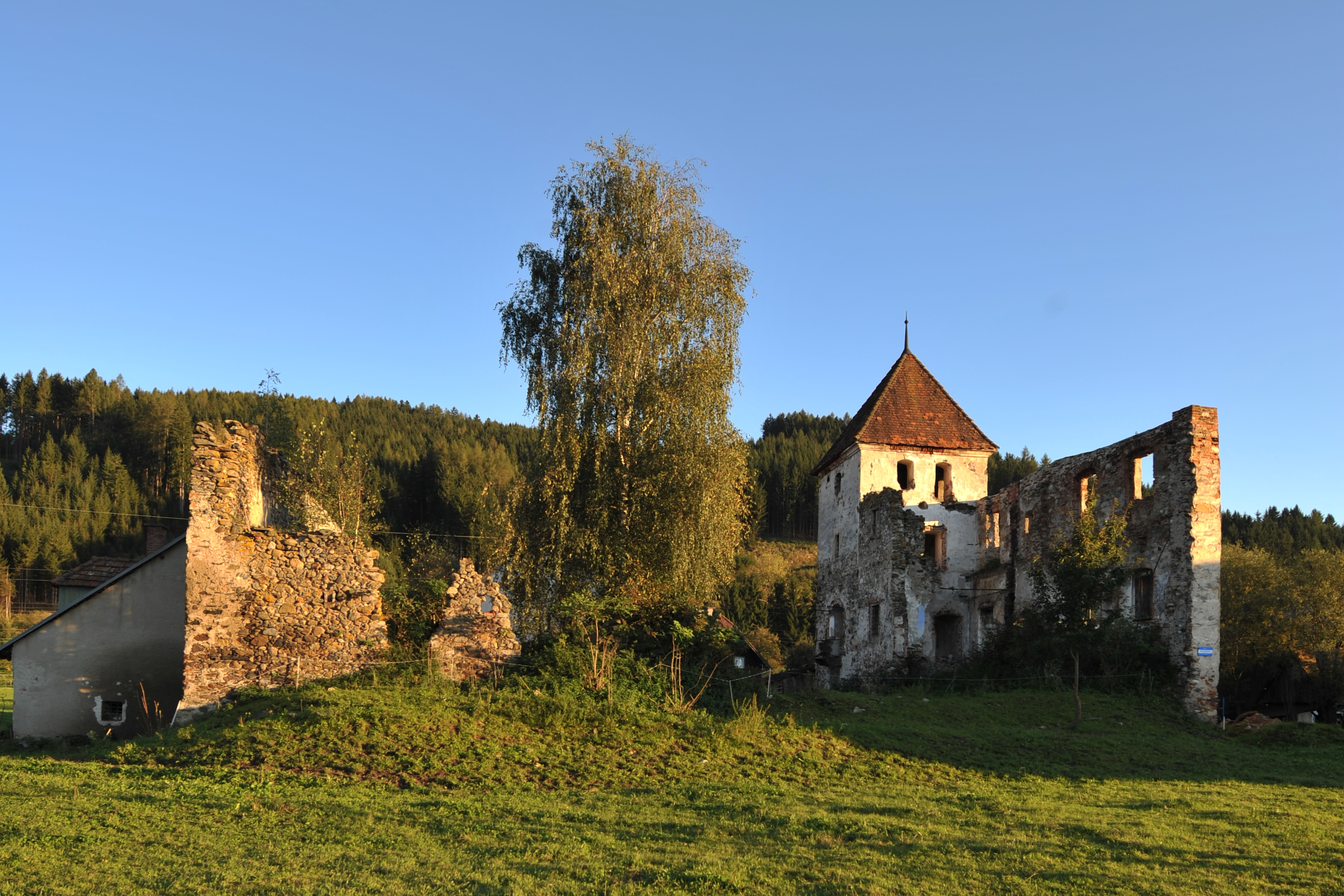
- Apfelberg ruins

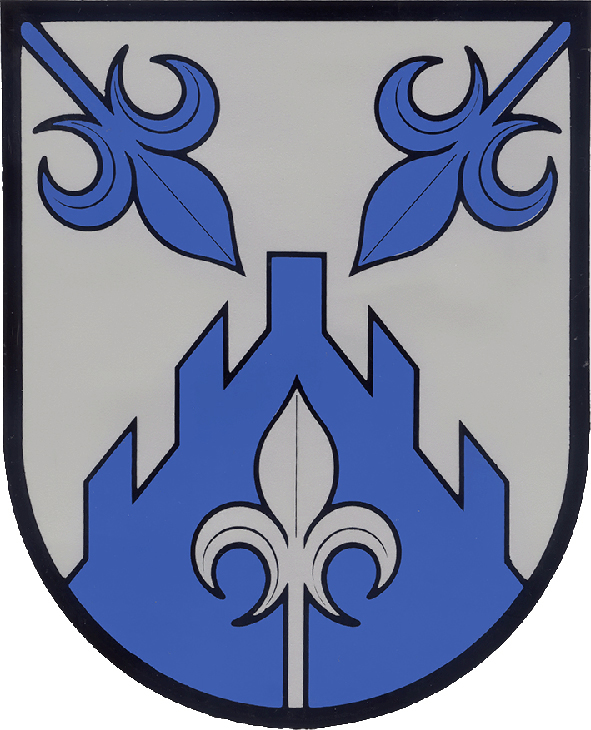
- Coat of arms

- Location within Austria
- Coordinates: 47°12′10″N 14°50′05″E
- Country: Austria
- State: Styria
- District: Murtal

Area
  - Total: 9.29 km^{2} (3.59 sq mi)
- Elevation: 625 m (2,051 ft)

Population (1 January 2016)
  - Total: 1,145
  - Density: 123/km^{2} (319/sq mi)
- Time zone: UTC+1 (CET)
  - Summer (DST): UTC+2 (CEST)
- Postal code: 8720
- Area code: 03512
- Vehicle registration: KF
- Website: www.apfelberg.at

Apfelberg (meaning "Apple Mountain" in German) is a former municipality in the district of Murtal in the Austrian state of Styria. Since the 2015 Styria municipal structural reform, it is part of the municipality Knittelfeld.

== Geography ==
Apfelberg lies at the northern foot of the Gmeinberg (el. 818 m). It stretches from the southern edge of Knittelfeld to the foothills of the Gleinalp.
