= Flatschach =

- Former municipality
- Location within Austria
- Coordinates: 47°13′00″N 14°45′17″E
- Country: Austria
- State: Styria
- District: Murtal

Area
  - Total: 7.43 km^{2} (2.87 sq mi)
- Elevation: 682 m (2,238 ft)

Population (1 January 2016)
  - Total: 192
  - Density: 25.8/km^{2} (66.9/sq mi)
- Time zone: UTC+1 (CET)
  - Summer (DST): UTC+2 (CEST)
- Postal code: 8720
- Area code: 03577
- Vehicle registration: KF
- Website: www.flatschach.at

Flatschach is a former municipality in the district of Murtal in Styria, Austria. Since the 2015 Styria municipal structural reform, it became a part of the municipality Spielberg.
