= Judenburg =

Place in Styria, Austria

Judenburg Judnbuag
- Municipality
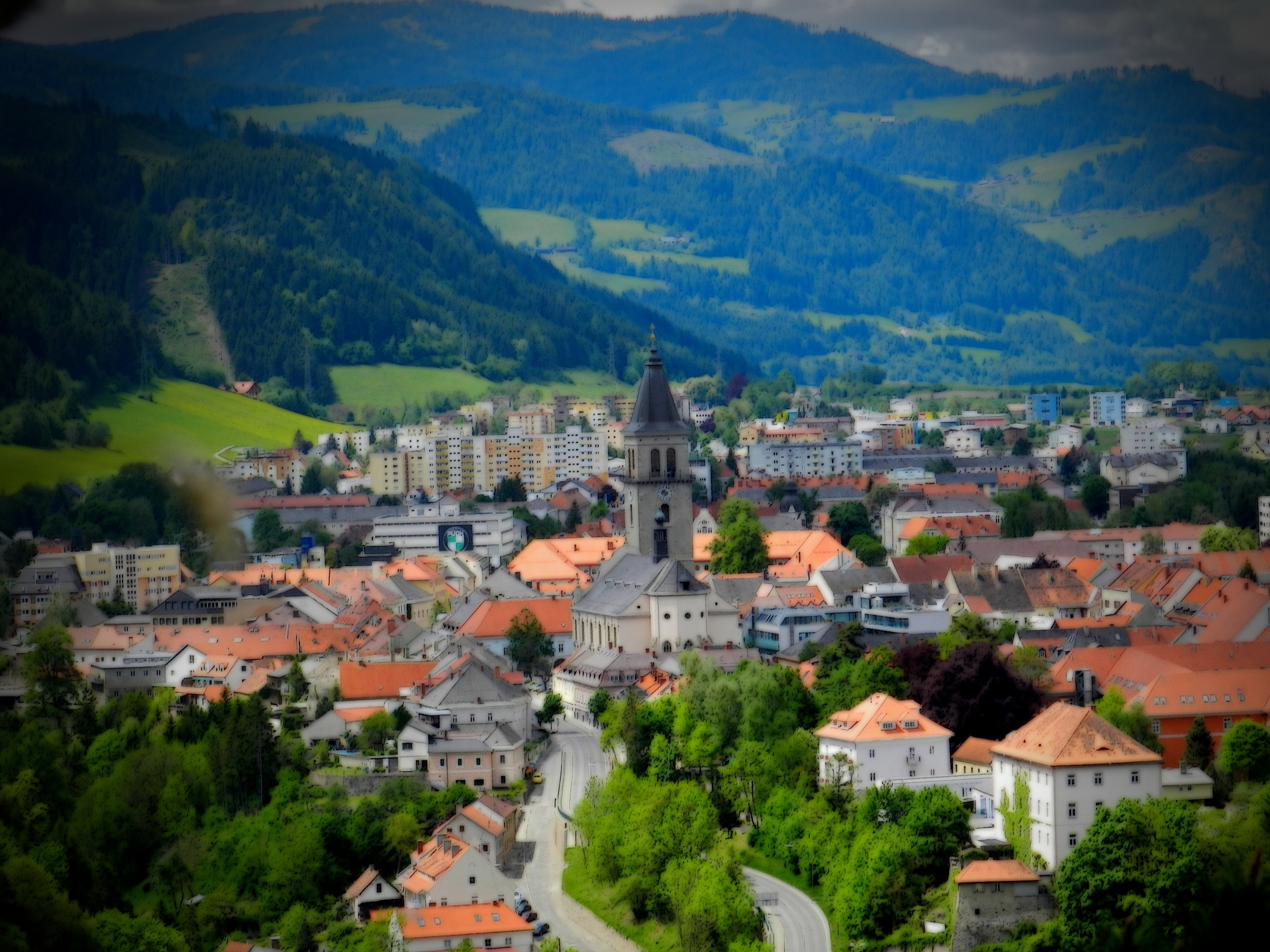
- View from southwest

- Coat of arms

- Location within Austria
- Coordinates: 47°10′21″N 14°39′37″E
- Country: Austria
- State: Styria
- District: Murtal

Government
  - Mayor: Hannes Dolleschall (SPÖ)

Area
  - Total: 63.69 km^{2} (24.59 sq mi)
- Elevation: 737 m (2,418 ft)

Population (2018-01-01)
  - Total: 9,960
  - Density: 156/km^{2} (405/sq mi)
- Time zone: UTC+1 (CET)
  - Summer (DST): UTC+2 (CEST)
- Postal code: 8750
- Area code: 03572
- Vehicle registration: MT
- Website: www.judenburg.at

Judenburg (German: [juːdn̩.buɐ̯k, juːdn̩.buʁk]; Bavarian: Judnbuag) is a historic town and municipality in Styria, Austria. It is located in Upper Styria in the Murtal region, on the Mur river and near the Aichfeld basin. The town is the administrative centre of the Murtal District, which was formed on 1 January 2012 through the merger of the former Judenburg District and Knittelfeld District. Until 31 December 2011, Judenburg was the capital of Judenburg District.

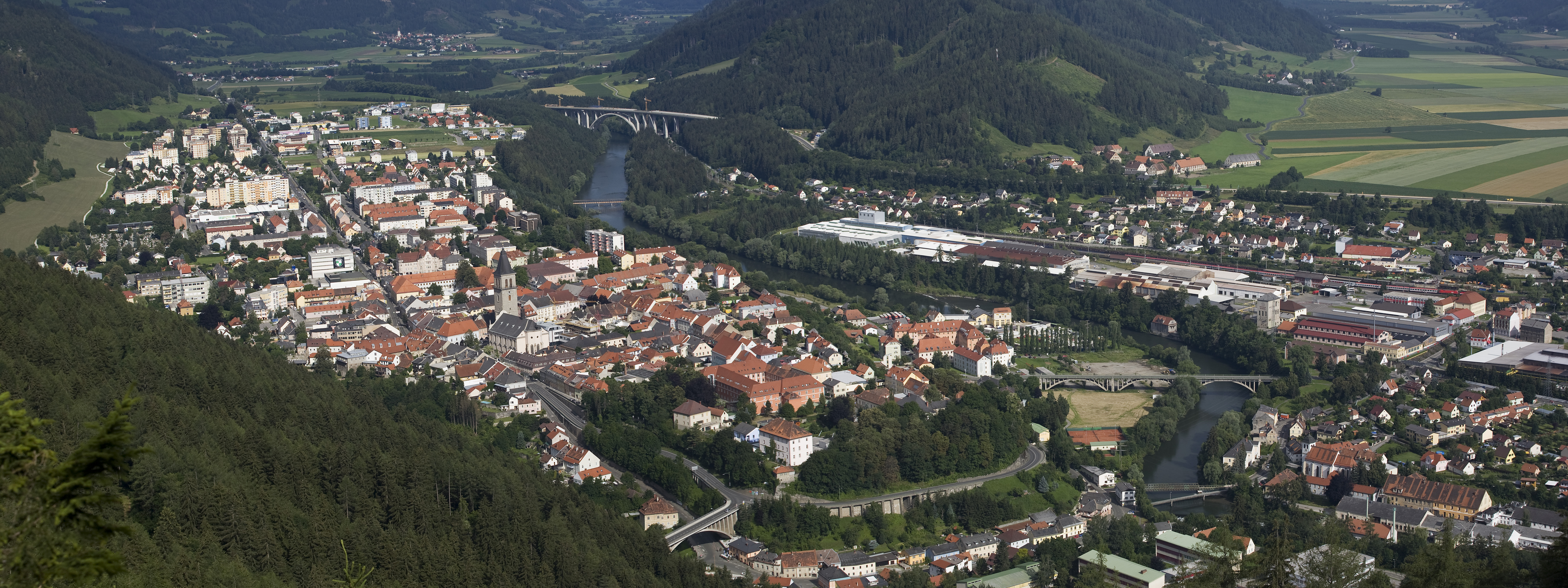
View of Judenburg from Liechtensteinberg

As of 1 January 2025, Judenburg had 9,623 residents with a main residence in the municipality, or 9,908 including secondary residences. The municipality covers 63.77 km^{2} (24.62 sq mi) and lies at an elevation of 737 m (2,418 ft). Its localities include Murdorf, Strettweg, Oberweg and Reifling. On 1 January 2015, the adjoining municipalities of Oberweg and Reifling were merged into Judenburg as part of the Styrian municipal structural reform.

The area around Judenburg was settled long before the medieval town developed. Archaeological evidence from the nearby Falkenberg shows iron mining and smelting activity during the early Iron Age, and the wider area is associated with important Hallstatt-period finds. In the Middle Ages, Judenburg grew into a significant trading and administrative centre in the southeastern Alpine region. Its name reflects the historical presence of Jewish merchants and residents; the earliest documentary reference to Jews in Judenburg dates from 1290. Judenburg does not have any Jewish residents currently, with the last Jews of the town ousted by the Nazis in 1938.

Judenburg reached its greatest economic importance in the late Middle Ages, when it held commercial privileges and served as a centre of trade and administration for large parts of Upper Styria. The Stadtturm, built around 1500, is the town’s best-known landmark and a symbol of its former prosperity. Since 2006, the tower has housed a planetarium.

Today, Judenburg functions as a regional administrative, educational, commercial and service centre for the western part of the Murtal. Its old town preserves several historic buildings, including burgher houses around the main square, churches and remnants of the town’s medieval urban structure.

== Geography ==
It is located in the Upper Styrian region, on the western end of the Aichfeld basin, stretching along the Mur River from Judenburg down to Knittelfeld in the east. The broad valley is bound by the Niedere Tauern range in the north and the Noric Alps (Lavanttal Alps) in the south.

The municipal area also comprises the cadastral communities of Tiefenbach and Waltersdorf, a former municipality incorporated in 1963.

The municipal area includes the following ten villages (populations as of January 1, 2020):

- Auerling (129)
- Feeberg (176)
- Gasselsdorf (28)
- Judenburg (8,386)
- Oberweg (517)
- Ossach (45)
- Reifling (57)
- Ritzersdorf (15)
- Strettweg (367)
- Waltersdorf (133)

== History ==
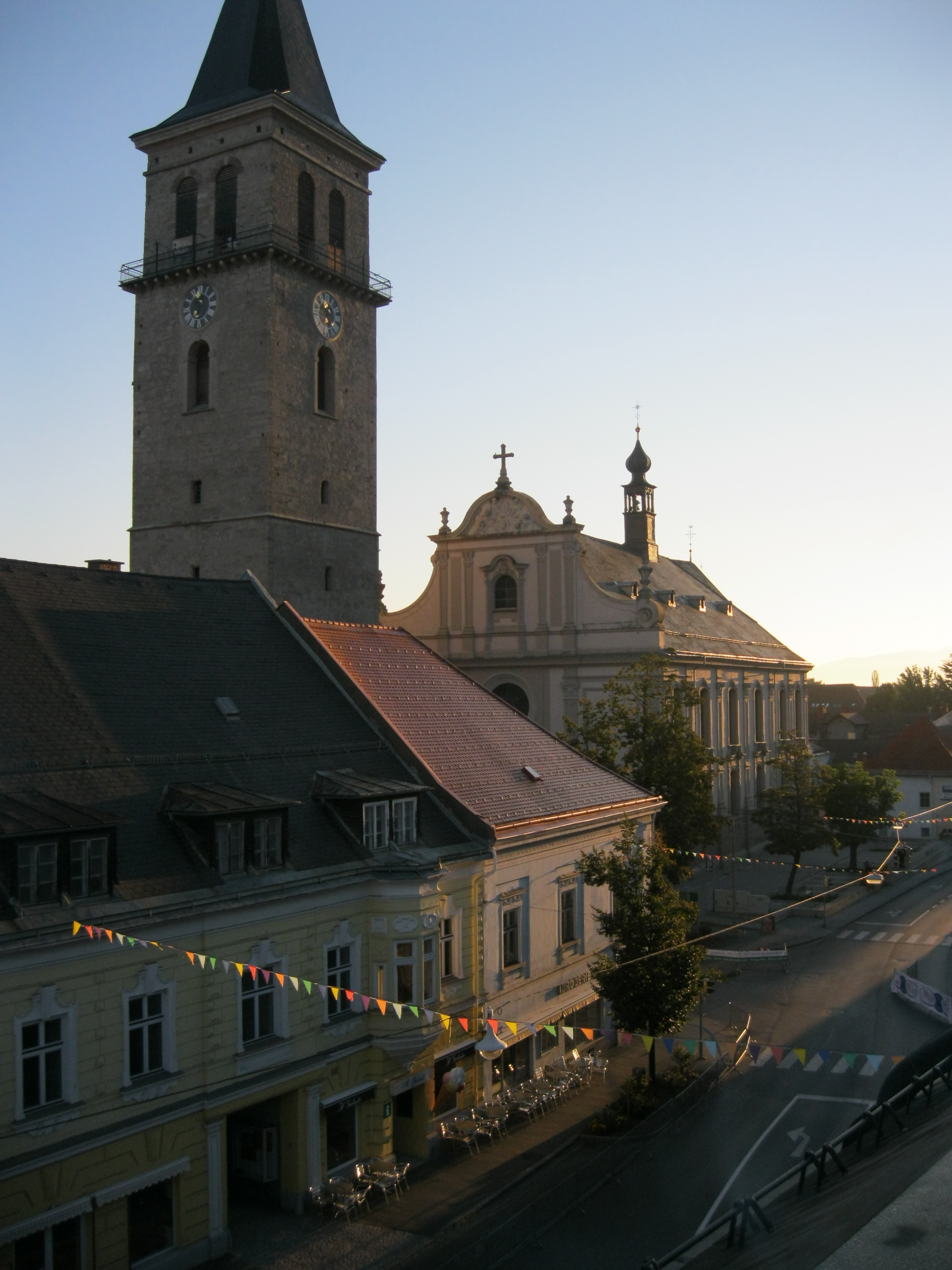
City Tower

Archaeological findings indicate that the area was settled at least since the days of the Celtic kingdom of Noricum. Judenburg itself was first mentioned in a 1074 staple right deed as mercatum Judinburch, a market town within the estates of Eppenstein Castle, the ancestral seat of the Bavarian Eppensteiner noble family, who ruled as Styrian margraves in the 11th century. The name literally means "Jews' Borough", referring to the town's origin as a trading outpost on the route from the Mur Valley across the Obdach Saddle mountain pass to Carinthia, in which Jews played an important role, being represented in the city's coat of arms.

Upon the extinction of the Eppensteiner dynasty in 1122, the estates passed to the Styrian Otakars and in 1192 to the House of Babenberg, Dukes of Austria since 1156. Judenburg received town privileges in 1224 and the right to collect tolls in 1277. The town grew to an important commercial centre for iron ore mined at nearby Eisenerz, but also for valeriana celtica used in perfumes during the 13th and 14th centuries. Judenburg was even granted a valeriana trade monopoly by the Habsburg emperor Frederick III in 1460. After several pogroms, all Jews were expelled from the Duchy of Styria by order of Emperor Maximilian I in 1496. Following his breakthrough in Italy, General Napoléon Bonaparte made his headquarters at Judenburg and it was there, on the night of 7–8 April 1796, that he signed the Truce of Judenburg with the Austrians.

In the beginning of the 20th century, the town was one of the centres of Austria-Hungary's steel industry and also a garrison city of the Austro-Hungarian Army. From 1910 to 1914, one of the first trolleybusses in Austria connected Judenburg station with the town's centre. Little remains of the former industry today, but Judenburg remains an industrial and trade centre. In May 1918, the city was the site of a failed military mutiny.

In 1938, with the annexation of Austria by Nazi Germany, Judenburg became part of the Third Reich. Due to the presence of the word Jude ("Jew") in the town's name, many possible new names were suggested, including Zirbenstadt (after Zirbe, the German name for the Swiss pine tree) and Adolfsburg (in honor of Adolf Hitler). However, the planned renaming was indefinitely postponed after the outbreak of war and ultimately never happened.

During the Second World War, a subcamp of Mauthausen concentration camp was located nearby, where a displaced persons' reception centre was established after the war. Judenburg was also one of several towns that saw the handover of Cossacks to the Red Army.

== Politics ==
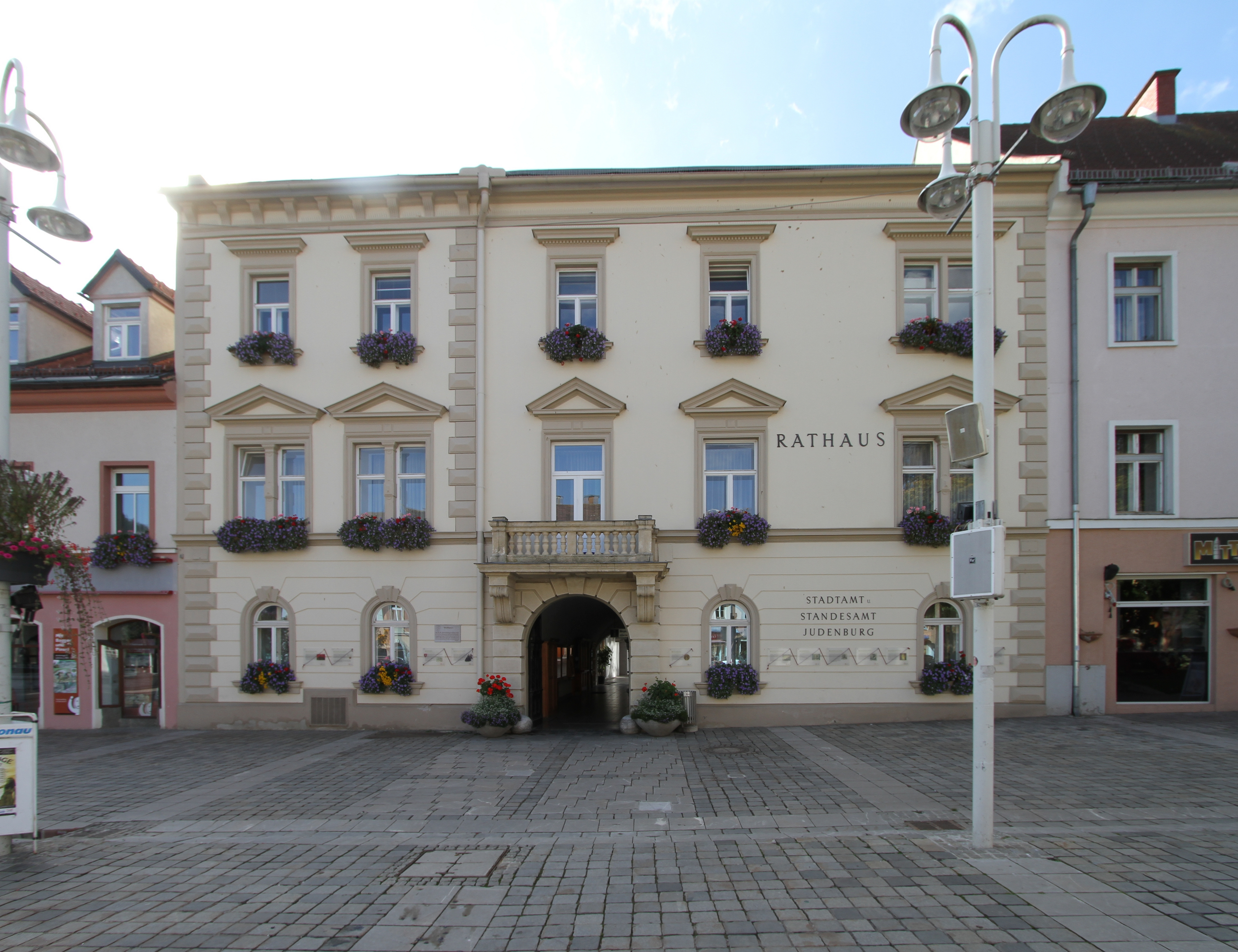
Town hall

Seats in the municipal assembly (Gemeinderat) as of the 2020 elections:

- Social Democratic Party of Austria (SPÖ): 13
- Austrian People's Party (ÖVP): 7
- Communist Party of Austria (KPÖ): 2
- The Greens - The Green Alternative (die Grüne): 2
- Freedom Party of Austria (FPÖ): 1

== International relations ==
=== Twin towns – Sister cities ===
Judenburg is a member of the Douzelage, a unique town twinning association of 24 towns across the European Union. This active town twinning began in 1991 and there are regular events, such as a produce market from each of the other countries and festivals. Discussions regarding membership are also in hand with three further towns (Agros in Cyprus, Škofja Loka in Slovenia, and Tryavna in Bulgaria).

Altea, Spain - 1991
Bad Kötzting, Germany - 1991
Bellagio, Italy - 1991
(Republic of Ireland) Bundoran, Ireland - 1991
Granville, France - 1991
Holstebro, Denmark - 1991
Houffalize, Belgium - 1991
Meerssen, the Netherlands - 1991
Niederanven, Luxembourg - 1991
Preveza, Greece - 1991
Sesimbra, Portugal - 1991
Sherborne, United Kingdom - 1991
Karkkila, Finland - 1997
Oxelösund, Sweden - 1998
Judenburg, Austria - 1999
Chojna, Poland - 2004
Kőszeg, Hungary - 2004
Sigulda, Latvia - 2004
Sušice, Czech Republic - 2004
Türi, Estonia - 2004
Érd, Hungary – 2005
Zvolen, Slovakia - 2007
Rokiškis, Lithuania - 2018
Marsaskala, Malta - 2009
Siret, Romania - 2010

== Notable people ==
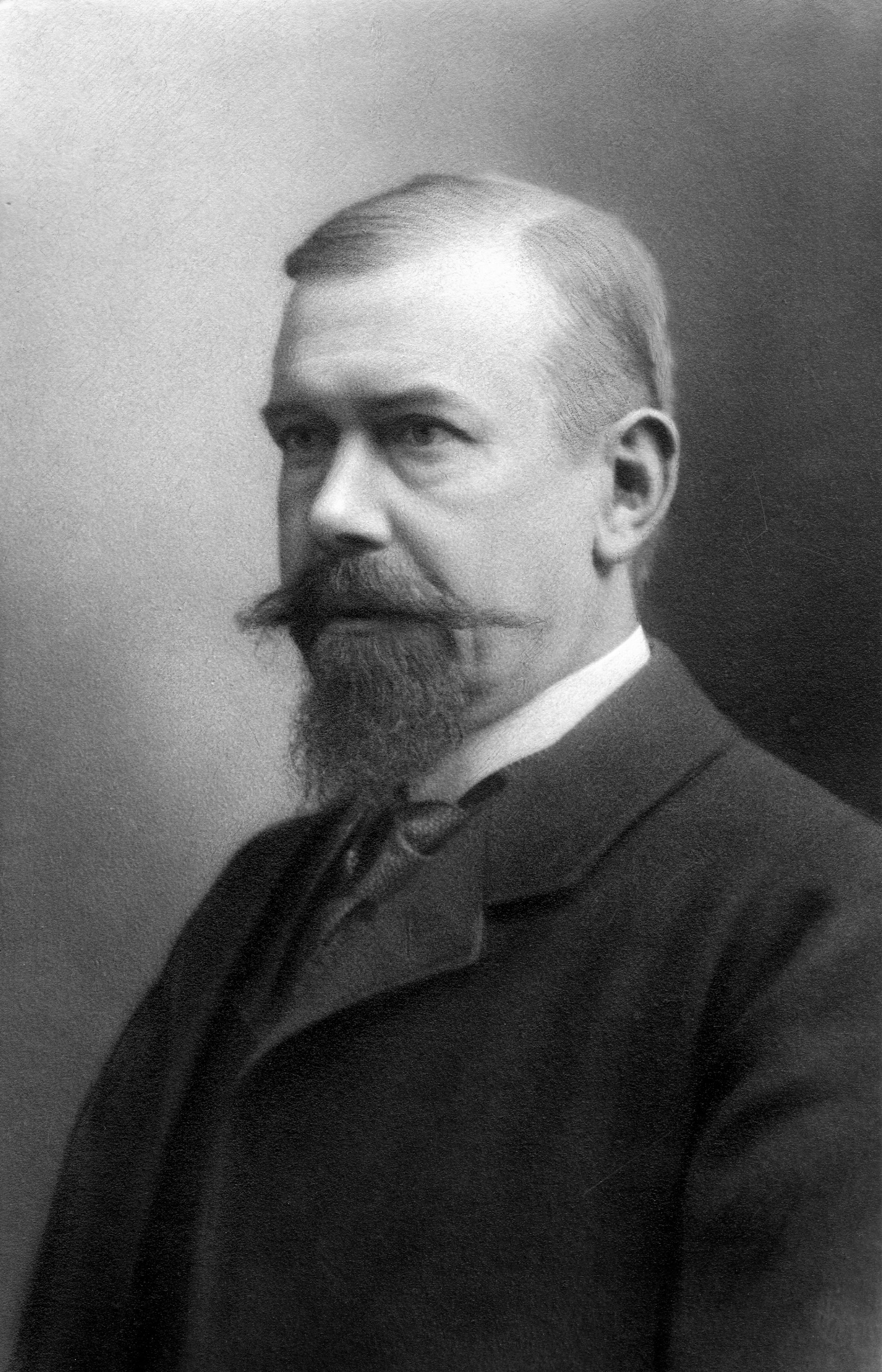
Richard Paltauf

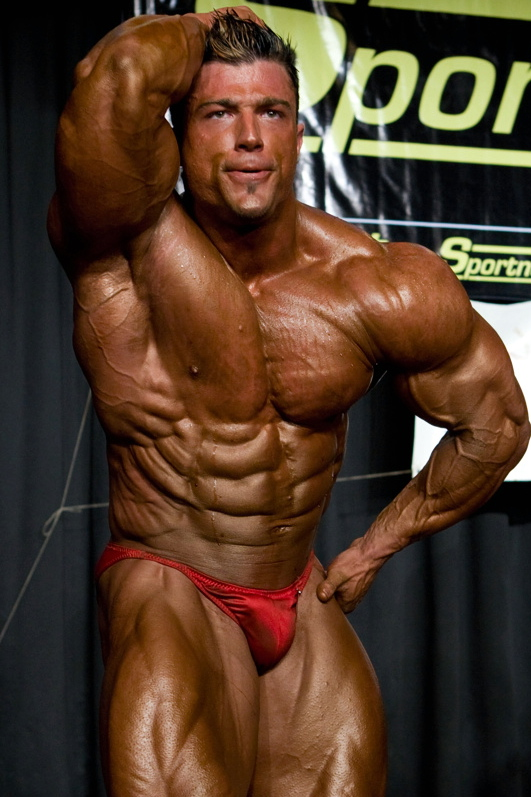
Tony Breznik, 2008

- Richard Paltauf (1858–1924), an Austrian pathologist and bacteriologist
- Michael Powolny (1871–1954), sculptor, medallist, ceramist, designer and teacher
- Walter Pfrimer (1881–1968), politician and Nazi, known for the 1931 Pfrimer Putsch, died locally.
- Maria Cäsar (1920-2017), an Austrian political activist (KPÖ) and resistance activist, lived locally.
- Jack Unterweger (1950–1994), author and serial killer
- Christian Muthspiel (born 1962), jazz musician, composer and trombonist
- Wolfgang Muthspiel (born 1965), jazz guitarist and record label owner
- Alf Poier (born 1967), singer-songwriter and stand-up comedian

=== Sport ===
- Harald Bosio (1906–1980), skier
- Gernot Jurtin (1955–2006), football player, played 373 games and 12 for Austria.
- Herfried Sabitzer (born 1969), football player, played 333 games and 6 for Austria
- Renate Götschl (born 1975), skier, won silver and bronze medals at the 2002 Winter Olympics.
- Christoph Sumann (born 1976), biathlete, two silver medals at the 2010 Winter Olympics
- Christian Pfannberger (born 1979), racing cyclist
- Andreas Zuber (born 1983), racing driver
- Thomas Krammer (born 1983), football player, played over 380 games
- Tony Breznik (born 1984), an Austrian bodybuilder
- Michael Madl (born 1988), football player, played 322 games
- Manfred Gollner (born 1990), an Austrian footballer who has played over 290 games
- Stefan Nutz (born 1992), an Austrian professional footballer who has played over 340 games
- Stefan Posch (born 1997), football player, played 220 games and 30 for Austria.
