= Tony Breznik =

Austrian bodybuilder

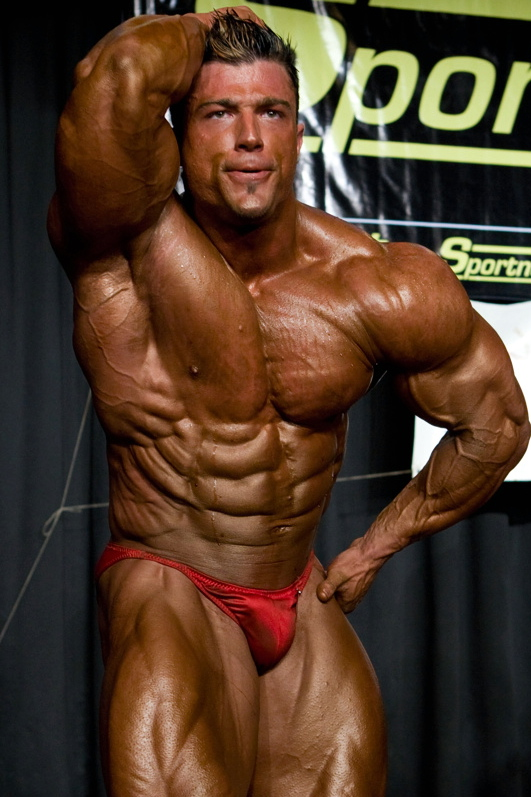
Tony Breznik fighting for the championship title in 2008

Tony (aka Anton) Breznik (born September 22, 1984) is an Austrian bodybuilder.

== Life ==
Breznik was born in Judenburg, Styria. Through his father he got to know and love the sport of ice hockey. He began to play ice hockey already at the age of 5. He was active in the teams of Zeltweg and Villach.

After a foot injury Breznik began to train with weights. The rehabilitation, however, became real bodybuilding. In 2005 he entered a bench press competition, in which he won the class up to 100 kg.

He was then invited to compete on the bodybuilding stage. At the age of 21, he entered his first physique contest, the 2005 IFBB Austrian Cup in Wels. He was winner of the junior class over 75 kg and overall juniors' winner. At this event Breznik was discovered by Ultimate Nutrition, a sports nutritional supplements company that offered him a sponsorship contract. Once a year he went to the U.S. for training and photo shoots and spent some time at fairs and exhibitions. At the FIBO in Essen, he was always invited to performances of his physique.

In 2008 he entered the IFBB Austrian championship, this time in the men's class up to 100 kg. He took first place in this contested category and won by performing a ferocious and convincing posedown. That performance also earned him the title "Mr. Austria".

Off-season Breznik weighs around 110 kg at a height of 175 cm. Like his role model, Arnold Schwarzenegger, he has become popular in the U.S. Like Schwarzenegger, Breznik is seeking a career as a professional bodybuilder.
