= Kobenz =

- Municipality
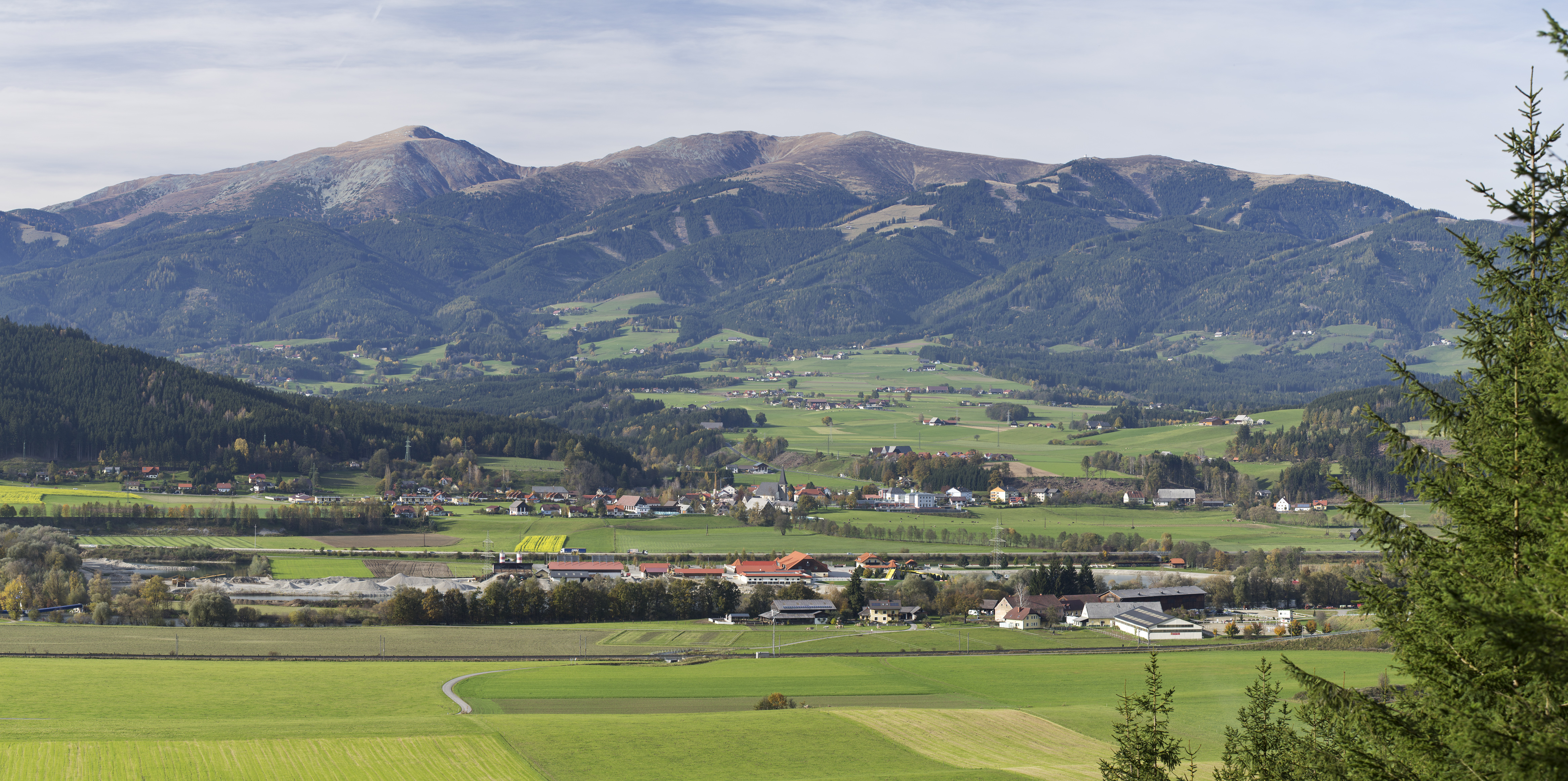
- View of Kobenz

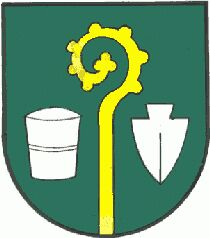
- Coat of arms

- Location within Austria
- Coordinates: 47°15′00″N 14°51′00″E
- Country: Austria
- State: Styria
- District: Murtal

Government
  - Mayor: Eva Leitold (ÖVP)

Area
  - Total: 17.65 km^{2} (6.81 sq mi)
- Elevation: 627 m (2,057 ft)

Population (2018-01-01)
  - Total: 1,864
  - Density: 105.6/km^{2} (273.5/sq mi)
- Time zone: UTC+1 (CET)
  - Summer (DST): UTC+2 (CEST)
- Postal code: 8723
- Area code: 03512, 03514 (Unter- and Oberfarrach)
- Vehicle registration: MT
- Website: www.kobenz.at

Kobenz is a market municipality in the Murtal District of Styria, Austria. It lies north of the Mur in the Murtal region, on the eastern edge of the Aichfeld and in the southern part of the Seckau Basin, near the foothills of the Seckau Tauern. The municipality is located near Knittelfeld and borders the municipalities of Seckau, Sankt Marein-Feistritz, Sankt Margarethen bei Knittelfeld, Knittelfeld and Spielberg.

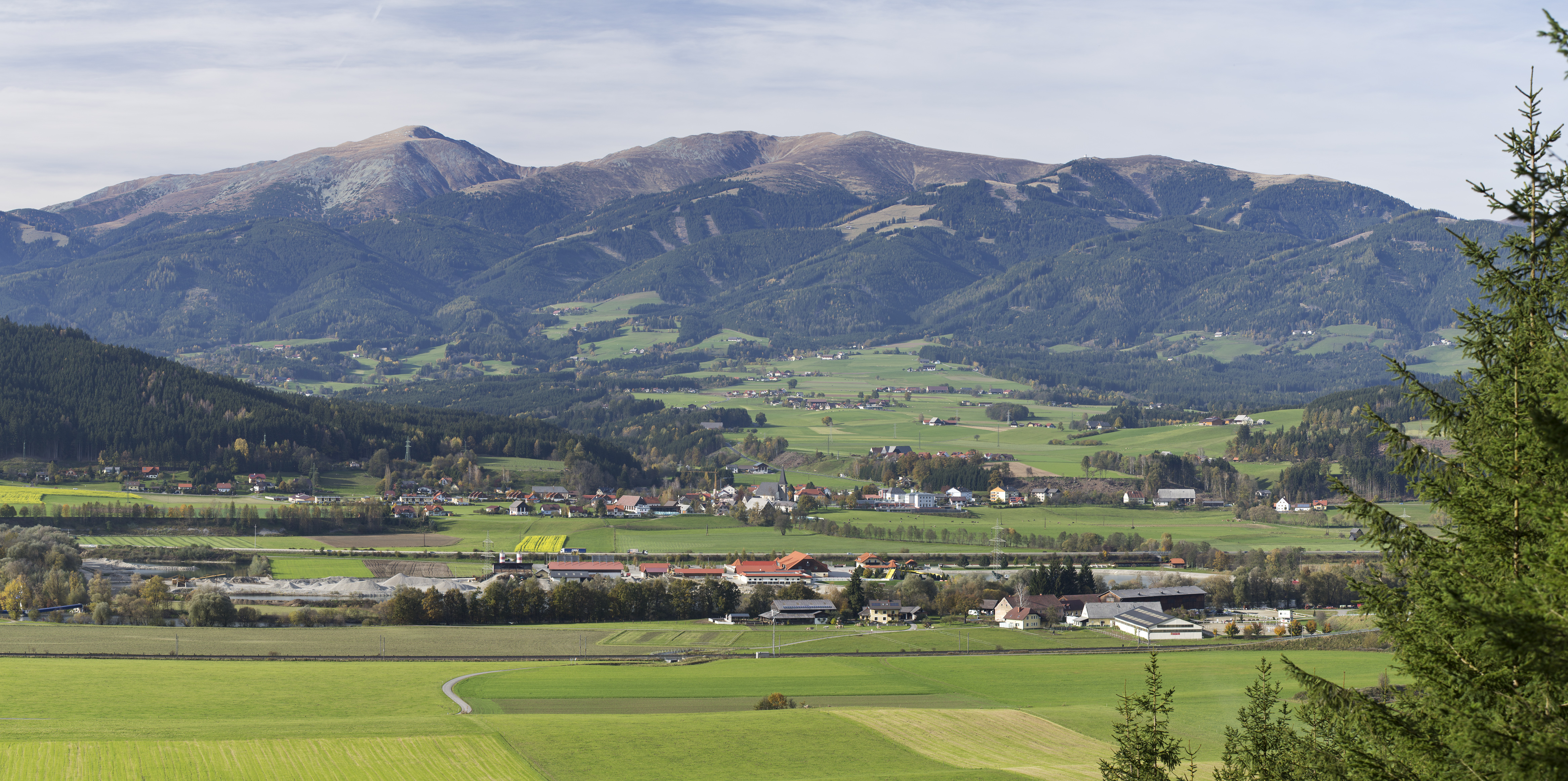
View of Kobenz from the southeast, with the Seckauer Zinken in the background

As of 1 January 2026, Kobenz had 2,077 inhabitants. The municipality covers 17.6329 km^{2} (6.8081 sq mi) and lies at an elevation of 627 m (2,057 ft). It has the municipal code 62014 and the postal code 8723. The municipality consists of the cadastral communities of Farrach, Kobenz and Raßnitz, and includes the localities of Hautzenbichl, Kobenz, Neuhautzenbichl, Oberfarrach, Raßnitz, Reifersdorf and Unterfarrach.

Kobenz is among the older documented settlements in the region. It was first mentioned in 860 as ad Chumbenzam in a charter of Louis the German. The parish was granted to the provostry of Seckau by Archbishop Eberhard I of Salzburg in 1151.

On 8 July 2007, Kobenz was elevated to the status of a market municipality, becoming the 125th market municipality in Styria. In 2010, the municipality celebrated its 1,150th anniversary with a local cultural year.

Kobenz is a rural residential and agricultural municipality with local services, small businesses and recreational areas in the surrounding countryside. Its landscape is shaped by the Mur valley, the Seckau Basin and views toward the Seckauer Zinken and nearby alpine foothills.
