= Upper Styria =

Region in Austria

Coordinates: 47.34°N 15.02°E

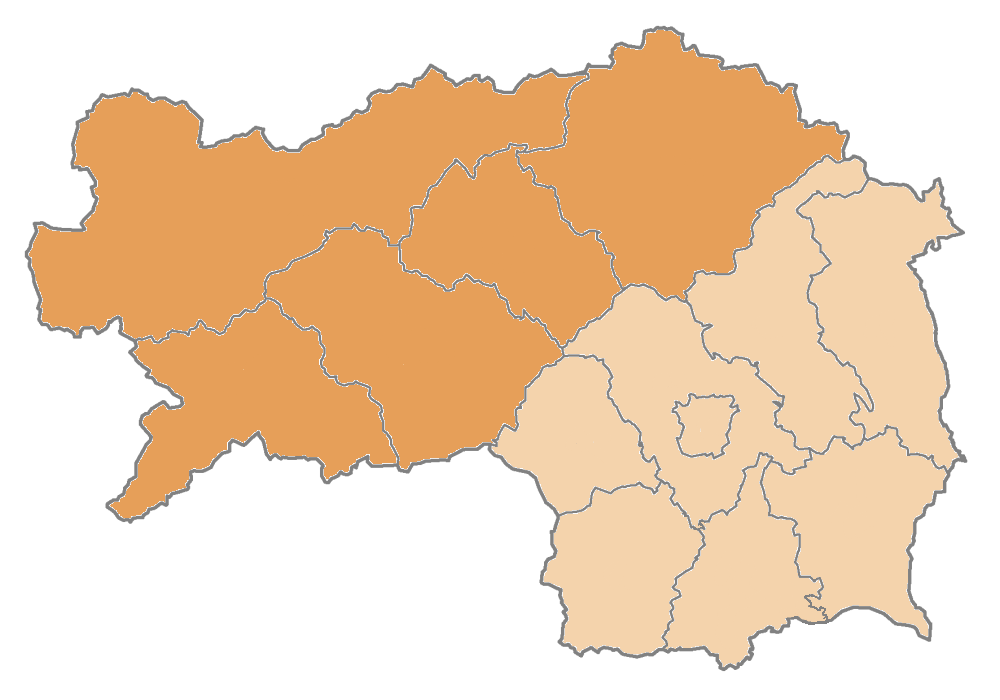
Obersteiermark districts within the state of Styria

Upper Styria (Austrian German: Obersteiermark), in the Austrian usage of the term, refers exclusively to the northwestern, generally mountainous and well-wooded half of the federal state of Styria. The southeastern half of the state around the capital of Graz is known as Central Styria (Mittelsteiermark), which is further divided into Eastern and Western Styria (east and west of Graz).

== Geography ==
Upper Styria is separated from Central Styria by the Stubalpe and Gleinalpe ranges of the Lavanttal Alps, and the Prealps East of the Mur. It is a generally rural region characterized by agriculture and tourism, except for the area between the towns of Judenburg and Mürzzuschlag, in the valley formed by the rivers Mur and Mürz, with extensive industrial sites. The area around Altaussee in the far northwest is part of the Austrian Salzkammergut cultural landscape.

The Obersteiermark region consists of five districts:

- Murau
- Liezen
- Murtal (former Judenburg and Knittelfeld)
- Leoben
- Bruck-Mürzzuschlag.

== Usage in Slovenia ==
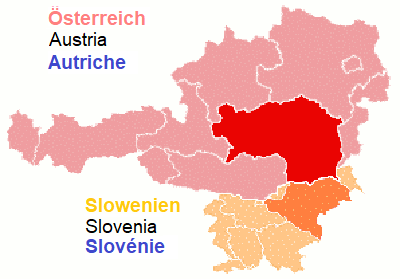
Former Styrian duchy in modern Austria and Slovenia

In Slovenian usage, the term Upper Styria (Zgornja Štajerska) refers to the whole Austrian state of Styria—as opposed to the traditional region called Lower Styria (Spodnja Štajerska), Slovenian Styria (Slovenska Štajerska) or just Styria (Štajerska), the southern third of the former Duchy of Styria which after World War I was allotted to the Kingdom of Yugoslavia according to the 1919 Treaty of Saint Germain and is today part of Slovenia.

== See also ==
- History of Styria
