= Sankt Wolfgang-Kienberg =

- Former municipality
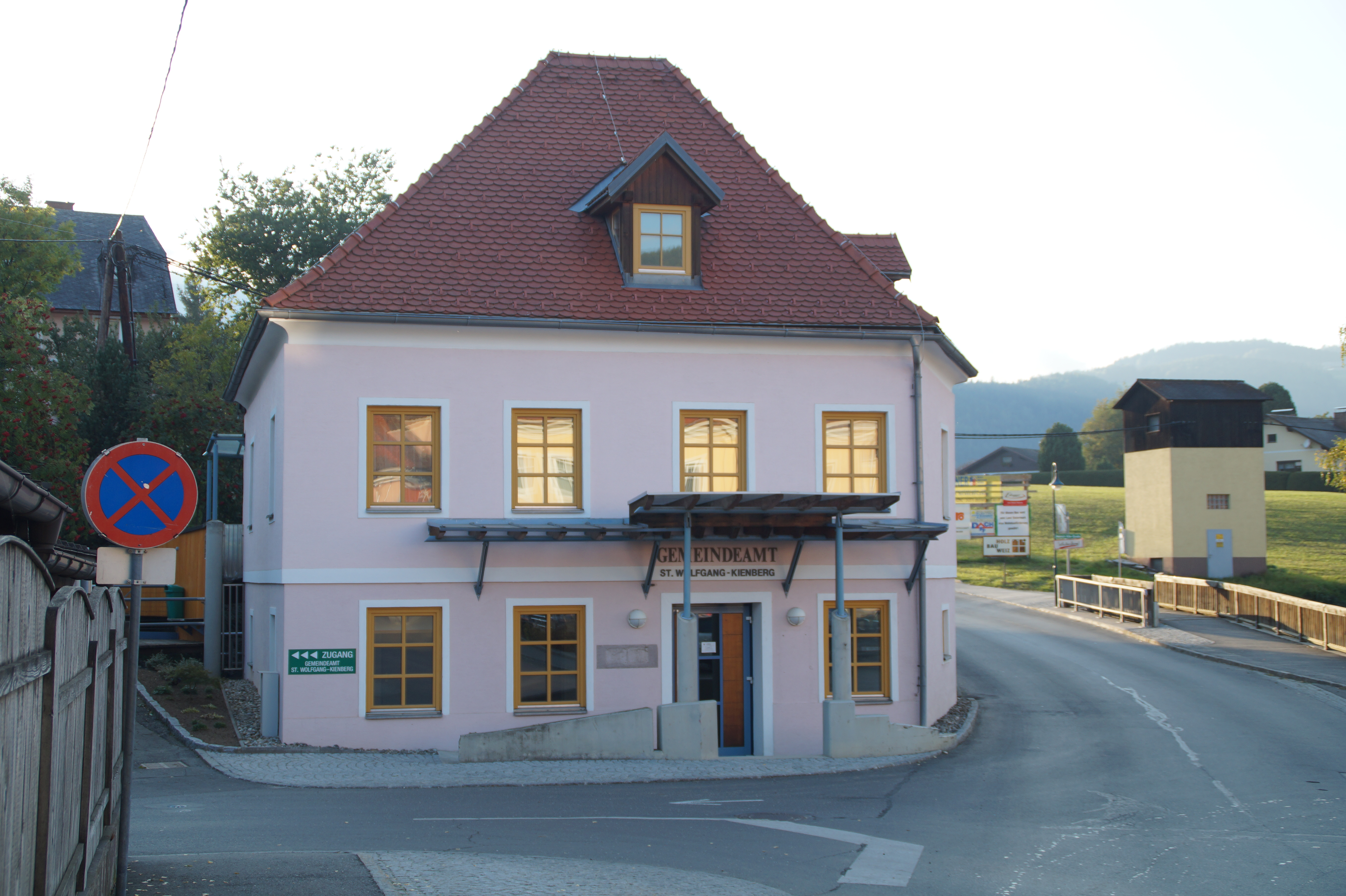
- Town hall

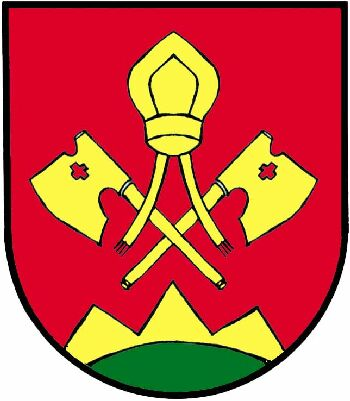
- Coat of arms

- Location within Austria
- Coordinates: 47°06′01″N 14°38′53″E
- Country: Austria
- State: Styria
- District: Murtal

Area
  - Total: 20.39 km^{2} (7.87 sq mi)
- Elevation: 1,277 m (4,190 ft)

Population (1 January 2016)
  - Total: 375
  - Density: 18.4/km^{2} (47.6/sq mi)
- Time zone: UTC+1 (CET)
  - Summer (DST): UTC+2 (CEST)
- Postal code: 8742
- Area code: 03578
- Vehicle registration: JU
- Website: www.st-wolfgang-kienberg.steiermark.at

Sankt Wolfgang-Kienberg is a former municipality in the district of Murtal in Styria, Austria. Since the 2015 Styria municipal structural reform, it is part of the municipality Obdach.
