= Oberweg =

- Former municipality
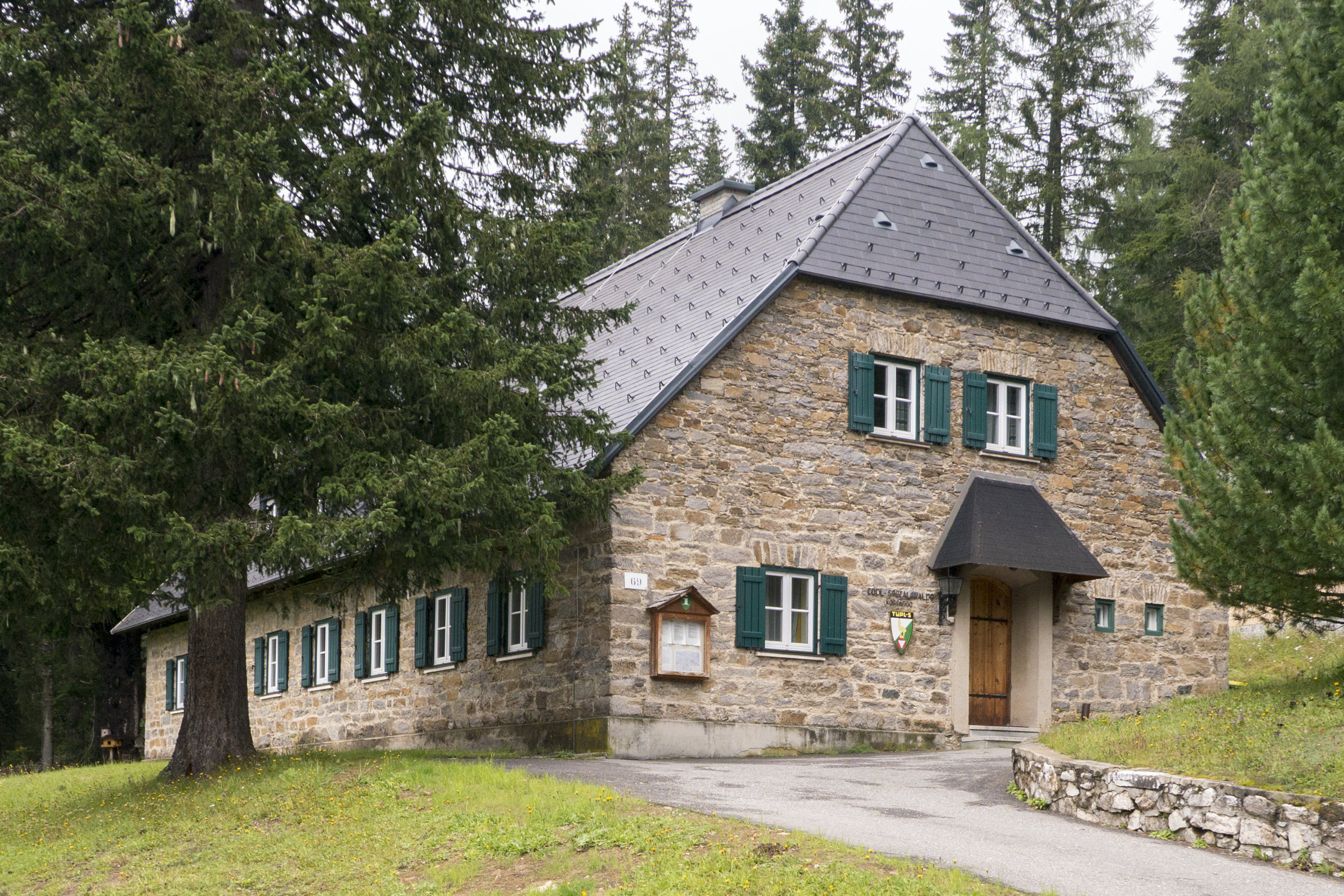
- Building in Oberweg

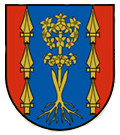
- Coat of arms

- Location within Austria
- Coordinates: 47°09′00″N 14°39′00″E
- Country: Austria
- State: Styria
- District: Murtal

Area
  - Total: 34.25 km^{2} (13.22 sq mi)
- Elevation: 760 m (2,490 ft)

Population (1 January 2016)
  - Total: 574
  - Density: 16.8/km^{2} (43.4/sq mi)
- Time zone: UTC+1 (CET)
  - Summer (DST): UTC+2 (CEST)
- Postal code: 8750
- Area code: 03572
- Vehicle registration: JU
- Website: www.oberweg. steiermark.at

Oberweg is a former municipality in the district of Murtal in Styria, Austria. Since the 2015 Styria municipal structural reform, it is part of the municipality Judenburg.
