= Pusterwald =

- Municipality
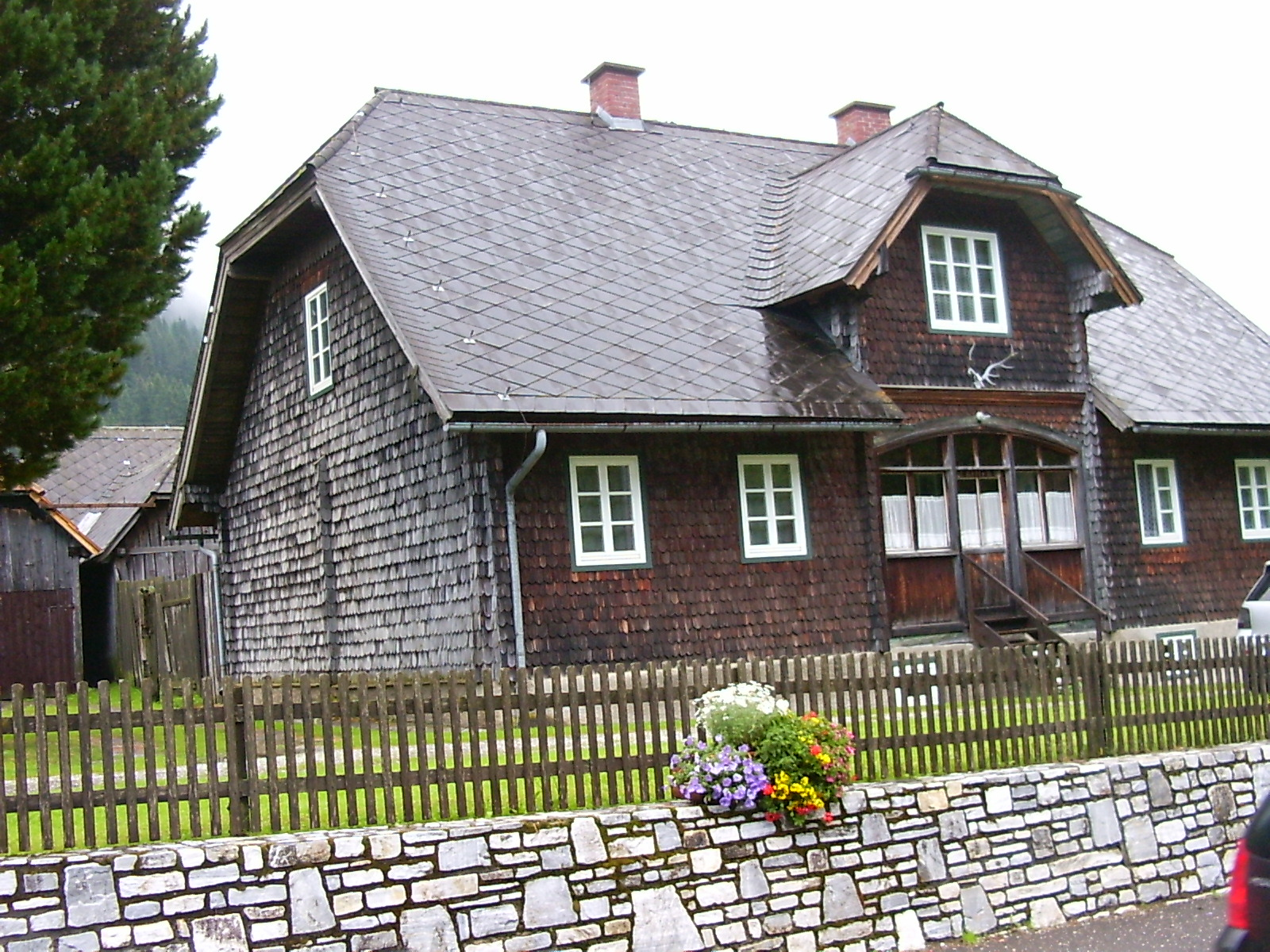
- Former house of Günther Schwab in Pusterwald

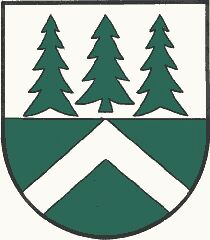
- Coat of arms

- Location within Styria Location within Austria
- Coordinates: 47°18′31″N 14°22′30″E
- Country: Austria
- State: Styria
- District: Murtal

Government
  - Mayor: Friedrich Strahlhofer (ÖVP)

Area
  - Total: 105.23 km^{2} (40.63 sq mi)
- Elevation: 1,072 m (3,517 ft)

Population (2018-01-01)
  - Total: 450
  - Density: 4.3/km^{2} (11/sq mi)
- Time zone: UTC+1 (CET)
  - Summer (DST): UTC+2 (CEST)
- Postal code: 8764
- Area code: 03574
- Vehicle registration: MT
- Website: www.pusterwald. steiermark.at

Pusterwald is a municipality in the district of Murtal in Styria, Austria.

== Climate ==
Climate data for Pusterwald: 1070m (3510ft) (1981−2010 normals, extremes 1971−2010)
| Month | Jan | Feb | Mar | Apr | May | Jun | Jul | Aug | Sep | Oct | Nov | Dec | Year |
|---|---|---|---|---|---|---|---|---|---|---|---|---|---|
| Record high °C (°F) | 14.2 (57.6) | 16.2 (61.2) | 19.4 (66.9) | 22.1 (71.8) | 27.2 (81.0) | 29.5 (85.1) | 33.6 (92.5) | 29.6 (85.3) | 27.6 (81.7) | 23.4 (74.1) | 19.5 (67.1) | 13.6 (56.5) | 33.6 (92.5) |
| Mean daily maximum °C (°F) | 1.0 (33.8) | 2.5 (36.5) | 6.1 (43.0) | 10.5 (50.9) | 15.7 (60.3) | 18.8 (65.8) | 21.1 (70.0) | 20.5 (68.9) | 16.7 (62.1) | 12.4 (54.3) | 5.5 (41.9) | 1.0 (33.8) | 11.0 (51.8) |
| Daily mean °C (°F) | −4.6 (23.7) | −3.6 (25.5) | 0.1 (32.2) | 4.1 (39.4) | 9.0 (48.2) | 12.2 (54.0) | 14.1 (57.4) | 13.3 (55.9) | 9.6 (49.3) | 5.4 (41.7) | 0.2 (32.4) | −3.6 (25.5) | 4.7 (40.4) |
| Mean daily minimum °C (°F) | −8.6 (16.5) | −8.0 (17.6) | −4.0 (24.8) | −0.4 (31.3) | 3.6 (38.5) | 6.7 (44.1) | 8.6 (47.5) | 8.2 (46.8) | 4.9 (40.8) | 1.1 (34.0) | −3.3 (26.1) | −7.1 (19.2) | 0.1 (32.3) |
| Record low °C (°F) | −26.2 (−15.2) | −26.6 (−15.9) | −25.1 (−13.2) | −11.5 (11.3) | −15.0 (5.0) | −3.4 (25.9) | 0.0 (32.0) | −0.4 (31.3) | −5.7 (21.7) | −14.5 (5.9) | −19.9 (−3.8) | −22.4 (−8.3) | −26.6 (−15.9) |
| Average precipitation mm (inches) | 45 (1.8) | 38 (1.5) | 55 (2.2) | 52 (2.0) | 95 (3.7) | 124 (4.9) | 144 (5.7) | 134 (5.3) | 95 (3.7) | 76 (3.0) | 65 (2.6) | 47 (1.9) | 970 (38.3) |
| Average snowfall cm (inches) | 35.6 (14.0) | 36.9 (14.5) | 45.7 (18.0) | 12.8 (5.0) | 0.7 (0.3) | 0.0 (0.0) | 0.0 (0.0) | 0.0 (0.0) | 0.1 (0.0) | 2.3 (0.9) | 17.2 (6.8) | 38.3 (15.1) | 189.6 (74.6) |
| Average precipitation days (≥ 1.0 mm) | 7.7 | 6.8 | 8.9 | 10.1 | 12.8 | 15.1 | 14.1 | 12.8 | 10.3 | 9.0 | 9.0 | 7.8 | 124.4 |
| Average snowy days (≥ 1 cm) | 28.0 | 25.7 | 21.3 | 5.2 | 0.3 | 0.0 | 0.0 | 0.0 | 0.0 | 0.8 | 10.7 | 24.8 | 116.8 |
Source: Central Institute for Meteorology and Geodynamics
