= Hohentauern =

- Municipality
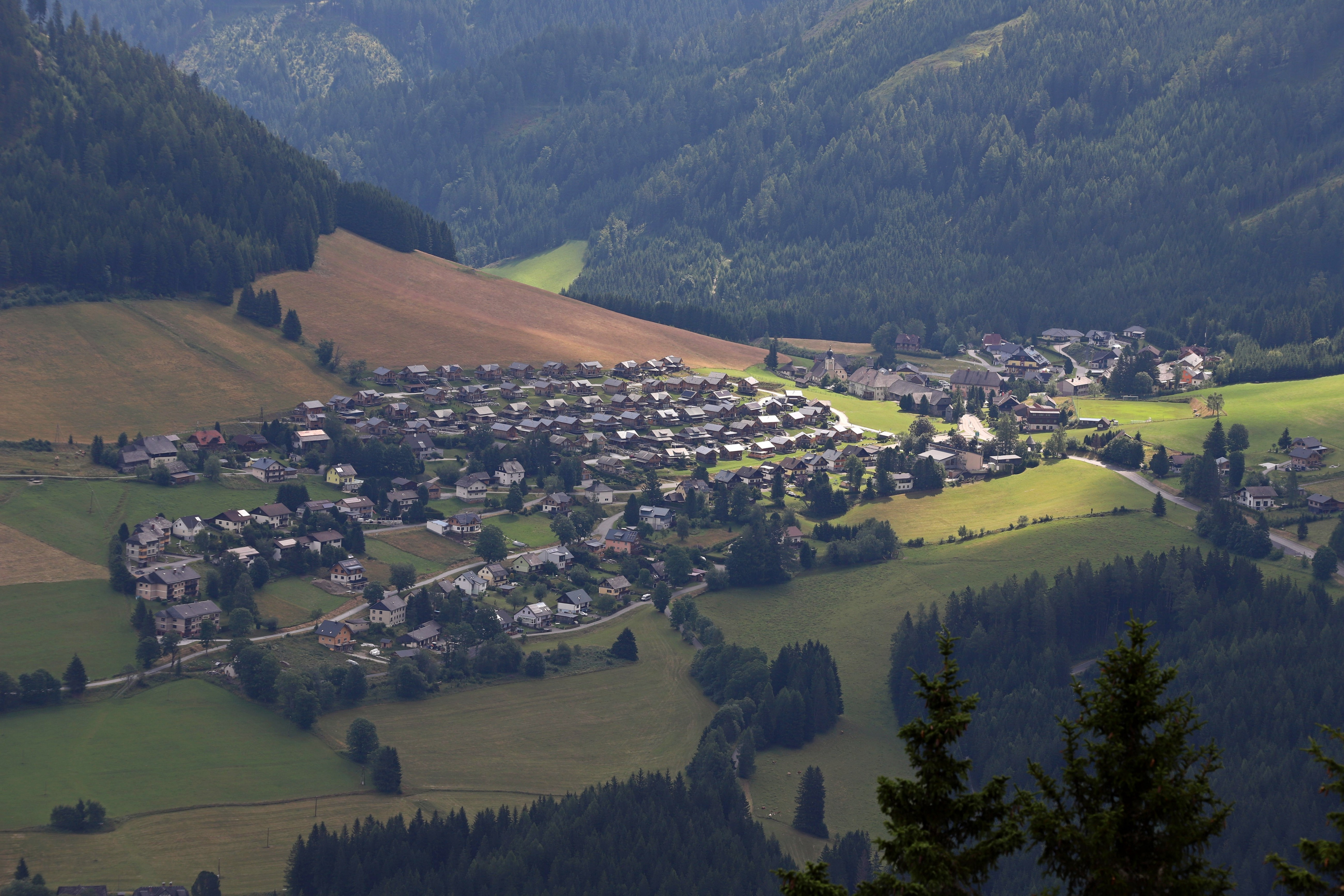
- View of Hohentauern

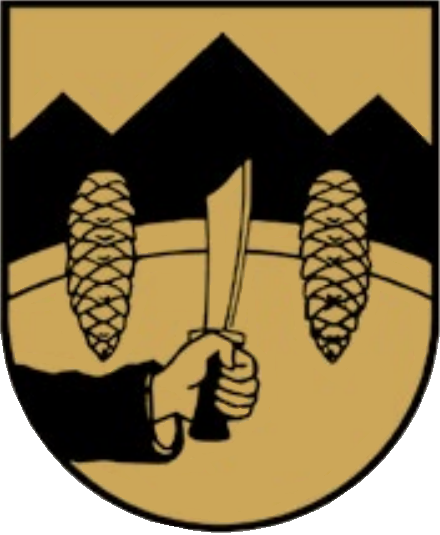
- Coat of arms

- Location within Austria
- Coordinates: 47°26′03″N 14°29′01″E
- Country: Austria
- State: Styria
- District: Murtal

Government
  - Mayor: Gernot Jetz (SPÖ)

Area
  - Total: 91.95 km^{2} (35.50 sq mi)
- Elevation: 1,274 m (4,180 ft)

Population (2018-01-01)
  - Total: 408
  - Density: 4.44/km^{2} (11.5/sq mi)
- Time zone: UTC+1 (CET)
  - Summer (DST): UTC+2 (CEST)
- Postal code: 8785
- Area code: +43 3618
- Vehicle registration: MT
- Website: www.hohentauern.at

Hohentauern is a municipality in the district of Murtal in Styria, Austria.
