= Sankt Peter ob Judenburg =

- Municipality
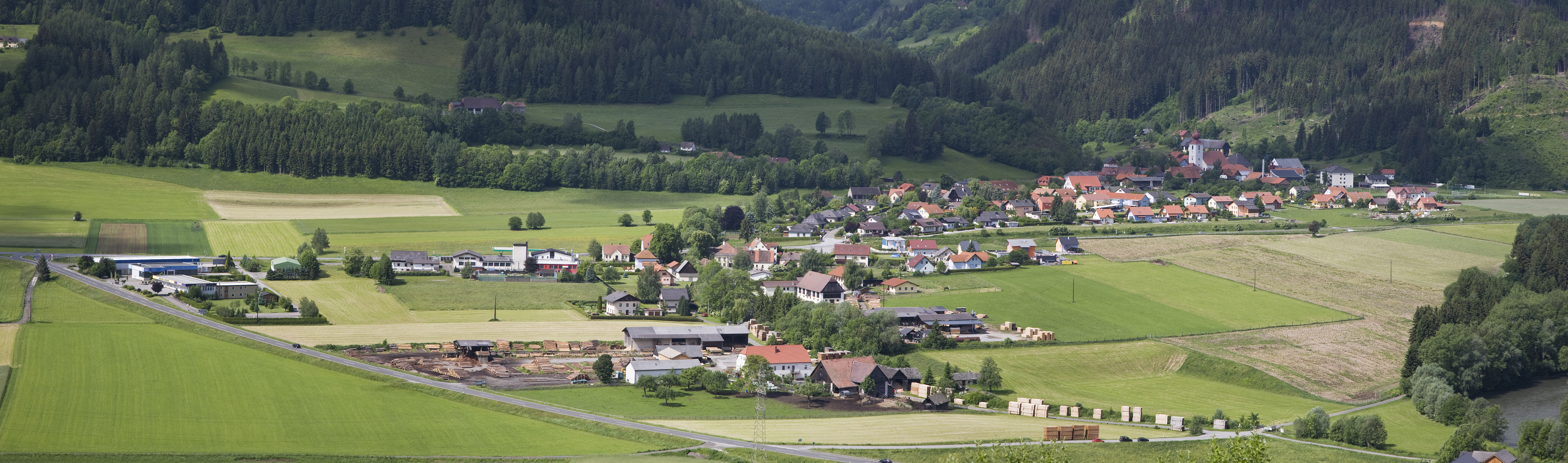
- View of Sankt Peter ob Judenburg

- Location within Austria
- Coordinates: 47°11′00″N 14°35′00″E
- Country: Austria
- State: Styria
- District: Murtal

Government
  - Mayor: Franz Sattler (ÖVP)

Area
  - Total: 50.42 km^{2} (19.47 sq mi)
- Elevation: 750 m (2,460 ft)

Population (2018-01-01)
  - Total: 1,108
  - Density: 21.98/km^{2} (56.92/sq mi)
- Time zone: UTC+1 (CET)
  - Summer (DST): UTC+2 (CEST)
- Postal code: 8755
- Area code: 03579, 03572
- Vehicle registration: MT

Sankt Peter ob Judenburg is a municipality in the district of Murtal in Styria, Austria.
