= Gaal, Styria =

Gaal
- Municipality
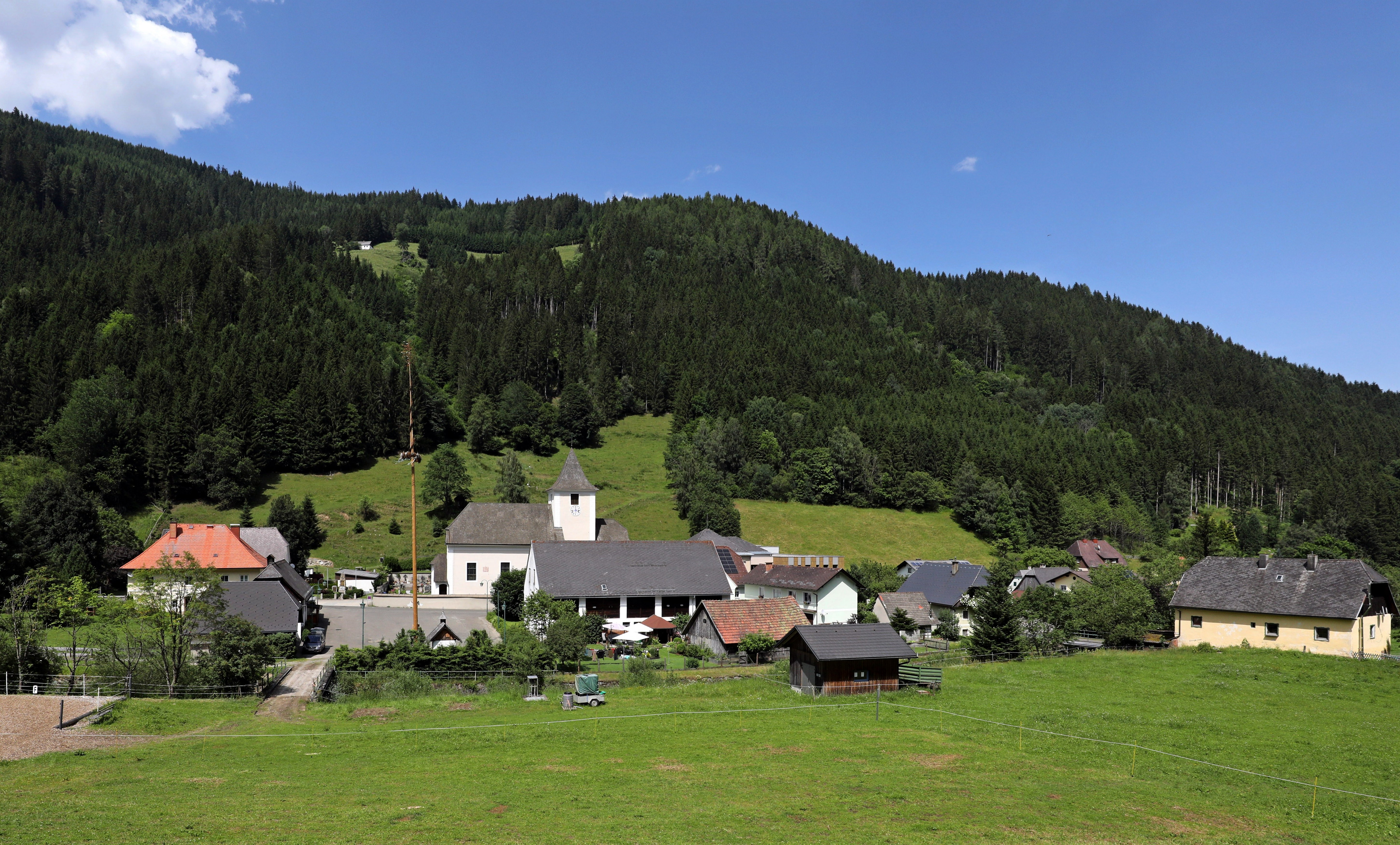

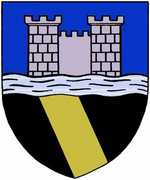
- Coat of arms

- Location within Austria
- Coordinates: 47°16′23″N 14°40′12″E
- Country: Austria
- State: Styria
- District: Murtal

Government
  - Mayor: Friedrich Fledl (ÖVP)

Area
  - Total: 197.3 km^{2} (76.2 sq mi)
- Elevation: 900 m (3,000 ft)

Population (2018-01-01)
  - Total: 1,376
  - Density: 6.974/km^{2} (18.06/sq mi)
- Time zone: UTC+1 (CET)
  - Summer (DST): UTC+2 (CEST)
- Postal code: 8731
- Area code: 03513
- Vehicle registration: MT
- Website: www.gaal.at

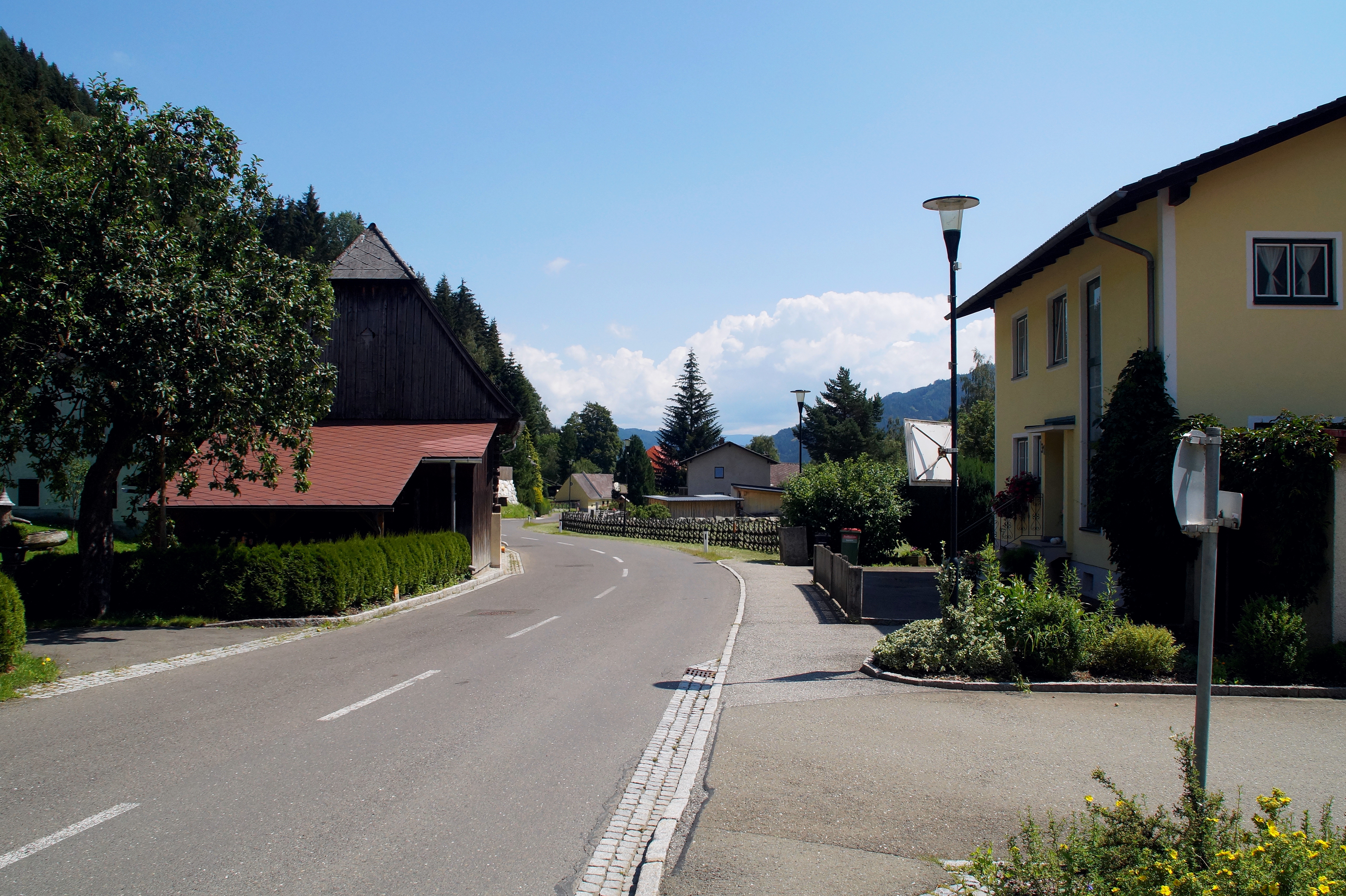
Gaal

Gaal is a municipality in the district of Murtal in Styria, Austria.
