= Sankt Georgen ob Judenburg =

- Municipality
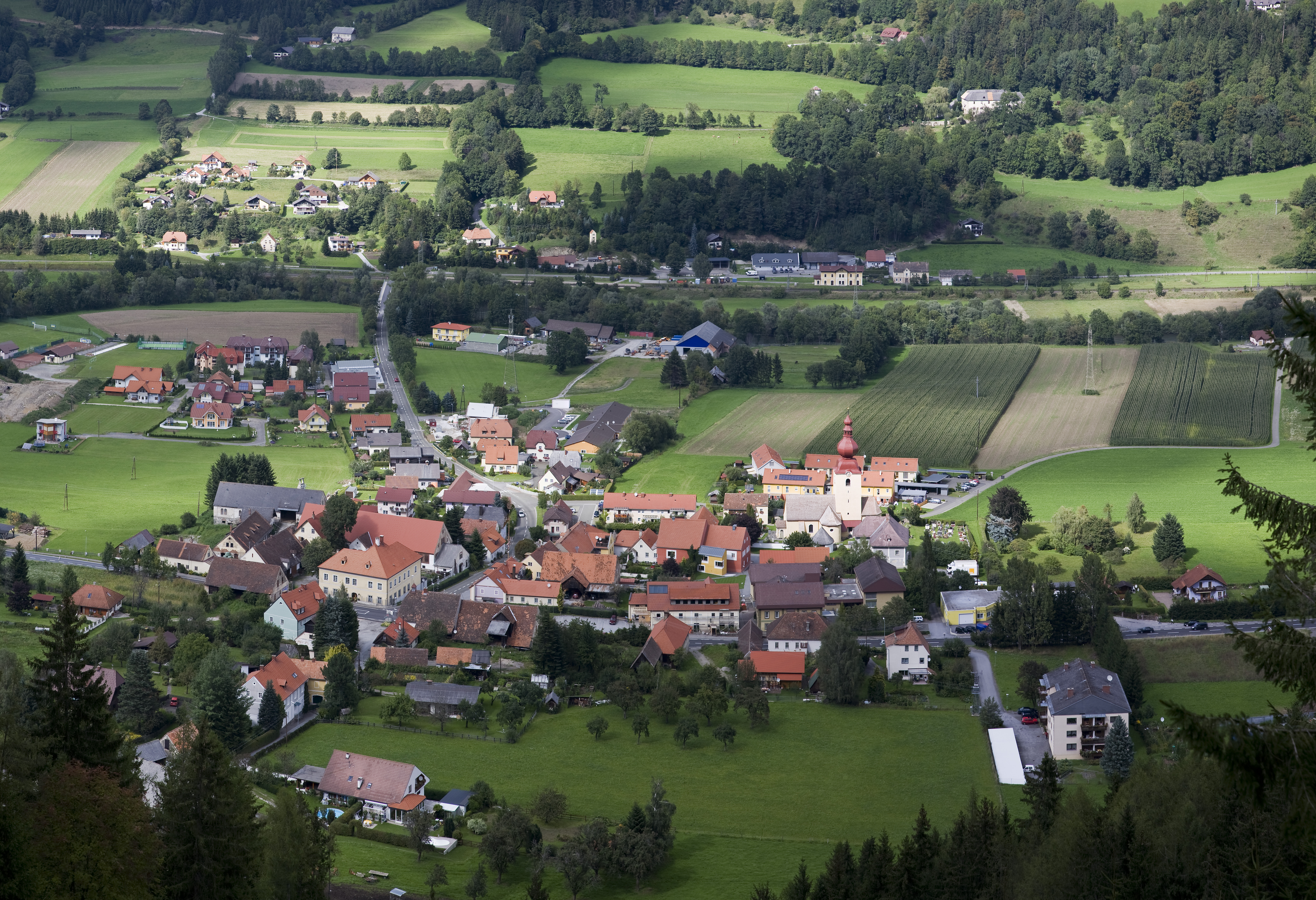
- Remote view of Sankt Georgen ob Judenburg

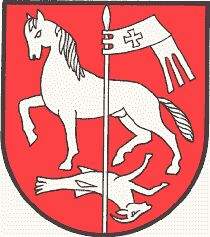
- Coat of arms

- Location within Austria
- Coordinates: 47°12′23″N 14°29′53″E
- Country: Austria
- State: Styria
- District: Murtal

Government
  - Mayor: Hermann Hartleb (ÖVP)

Area
  - Total: 44.32 km^{2} (17.11 sq mi)
- Elevation: 734 m (2,408 ft)

Population (2018-01-01)
  - Total: 850
  - Density: 19/km^{2} (50/sq mi)
- Time zone: UTC+1 (CET)
  - Summer (DST): UTC+2 (CEST)
- Postal code: 8756
- Area code: 03583
- Vehicle registration: JU
- Website: www.st-georgen-judenburg. steiermark.at

Sankt Georgen ob Judenburg is a municipality in the district of Murtal in Styria, Austria.
