= 2008 Graz local election =

Local election in Austria

Local elections were held in Graz on 20 January 2008. Apart from the five parties present in the municipal council – the Austrian People's Party, the Social Democratic Party of Austria, the Communist Party of Austria, the Freedom Party of Austria and the Greens – The Green Alternative – the Alliance for the Future of Austria also contested the election.

A poll from early December 2007 saw the lead of incumbent mayor Siegfried Nagl (ÖVP) diminish:

- ÖVP: 32% (2003: 36.1%)
- SPÖ: 28% (2003: 25.9%)
- KPÖ: 15% (2003: 20.8%)
- Grüne: 14% (2003: 8.3%)
- FPÖ: 8% (2003: 8%)
- BZÖ: 2% (2003: n/a)

Summary of the 20 January 2008 Graz local election results
Party	Votes	%	Seats	+/–	Councillors	+/–
Austrian People's Party (ÖVP)	43,274	38.37	23	+2	4	±0
Social Democratic Party of Austria (SPÖ)	22,266	19.74	11	–4	2	–1
The Greens – The Green Alternative (Grüne)	16,416	14.56	8	+4	1	+1
Communist Party of Austria (KPÖ)	12,611	11.18	6	–6	1	–1
Freedom Party of Austria (FPÖ)	12,235	10.85	6	+2	1	+1
Alliance for the Future of Austria (BZÖ)	4,857	4.31	2	+2	—	—
Austrian Drivers' and Citizens' Party (ÖABP)	556	0.49	—	—	—	—
Wegscheidler's List (WEG)	231	0.20	—	—	—	—
Peter Pailer's List (SALZ)	218	0.19	—	—	—	—
Centre Party Austria (ZPA)	111	0.10	—	—	—	—
Total (turnout 57.90%)	114,654	100.00	56	—	9	—
Source: Archived 2008-01-23 at the Wayback Machine

Popular Vote
ÖVP	38.37%
SPÖ	19.74%
GRÜNE	14.56%
KPÖ	11.18%
FPÖ	10.85%
BZÖ	4.31%
Other	0.99%
