= Seckau =

- Municipality
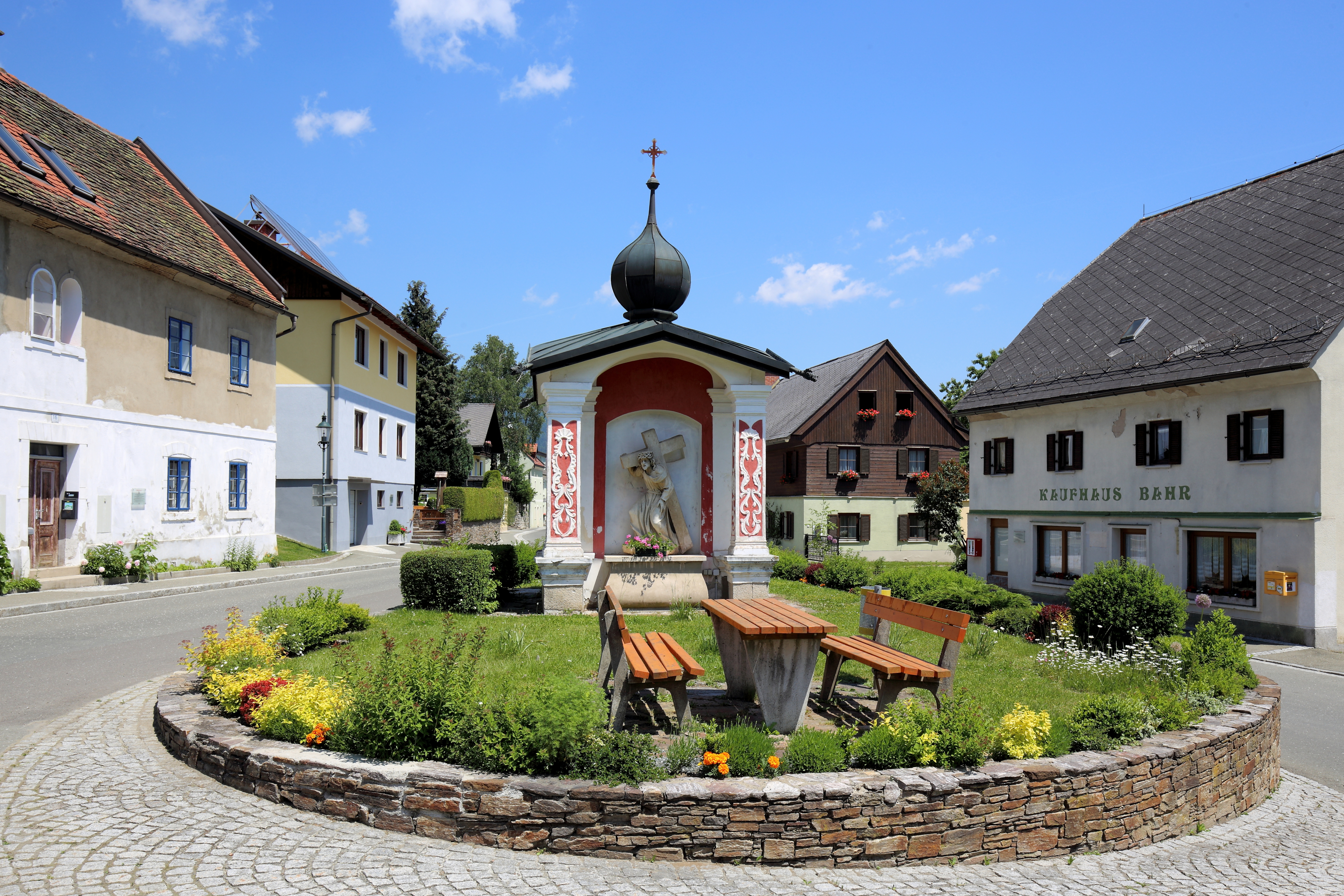
- Centre of Seckau

- Coat of arms

- Location within Austria
- Coordinates: 47°16′30″N 14°47′6″E
- Country: Austria
- State: Styria
- District: Murtal

Government
  - Mayor: Simon Pletz (ÖVP)

Area
  - Total: 46.26 km^{2} (17.86 sq mi)
- Elevation: 843 m (2,766 ft)

Population (2018-01-01)
  - Total: 1,281
  - Density: 27.69/km^{2} (71.72/sq mi)
- Time zone: UTC+1 (CET)
  - Summer (DST): UTC+2 (CEST)
- Postal code: 8732
- Area code: 03514
- Vehicle registration: KF
- Website: www.seckau.at

Seckau (Slovene: Sekava) is a Marktgemeinde in the state of Styria, Austria. It is situated near Knittelfeld. It is known for the Benedictine Seckau Abbey, once the seat of the diocese of Graz-Seckau.
