= Fohnsdorf =

- Municipality
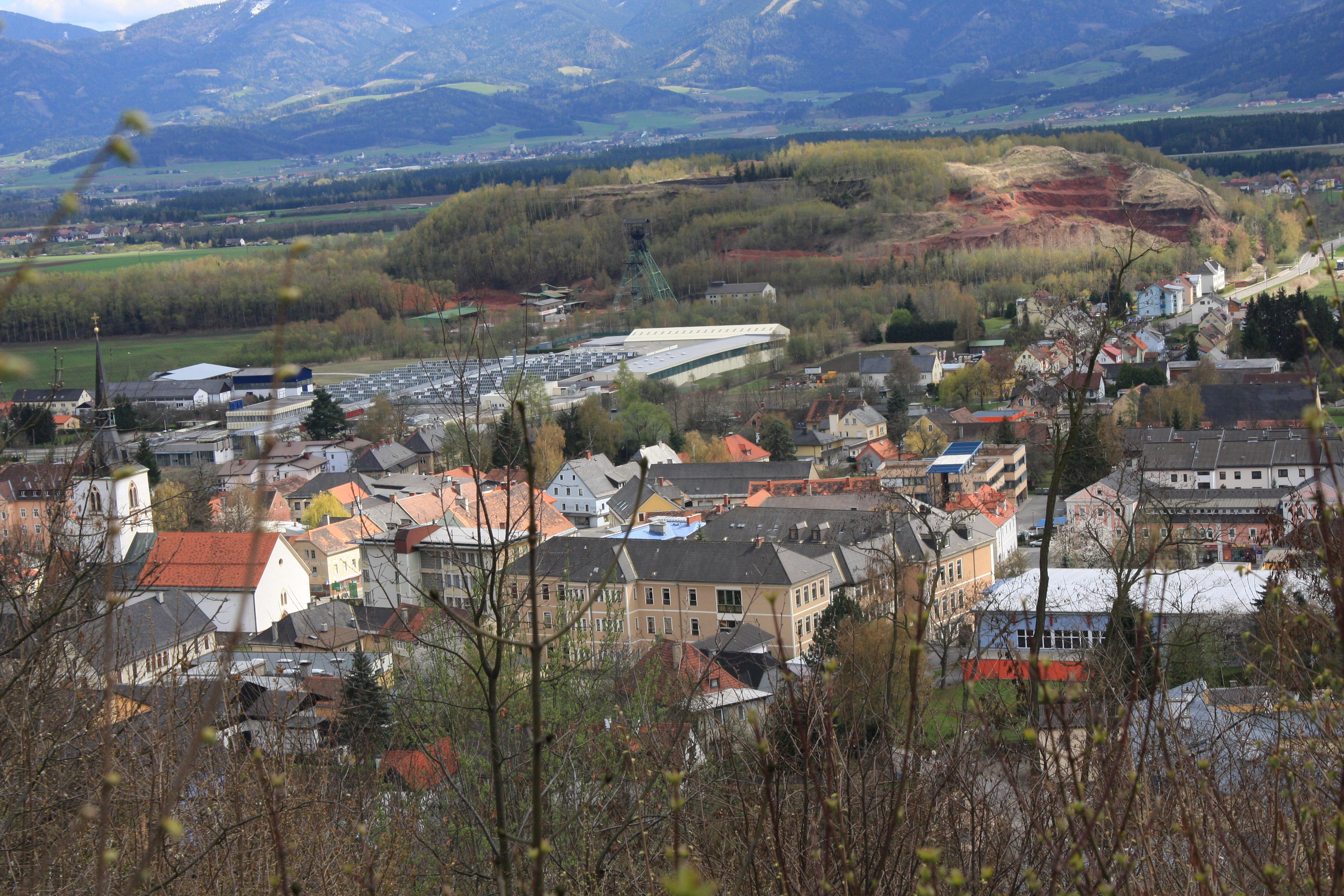
- View of Fohnsdorf

- Coat of arms

- Location within Austria
- Coordinates: 47°12′30″N 14°40′46″E
- Country: Austria
- State: Styria
- District: Murtal

Government
  - Mayor: Gernot Lobnig (SPÖ)

Area
  - Total: 54.69 km^{2} (21.12 sq mi)
- Elevation: 736 m (2,415 ft)

Population (2018-01-01)
  - Total: 7,693
  - Density: 140.7/km^{2} (364.3/sq mi)
- Time zone: UTC+1 (CET)
  - Summer (DST): UTC+2 (CEST)
- Postal code: 8753
- Area code: 0 35 73
- Vehicle registration: MT
- Website: www.fohnsdorf.at

Fohnsdorf (German pronunciation: [ˈfoːnsˌdɔʁf]) is a municipality in the district of Murtal in Styria, Austria.
