= Weißkirchen in Steiermark =

- Municipality
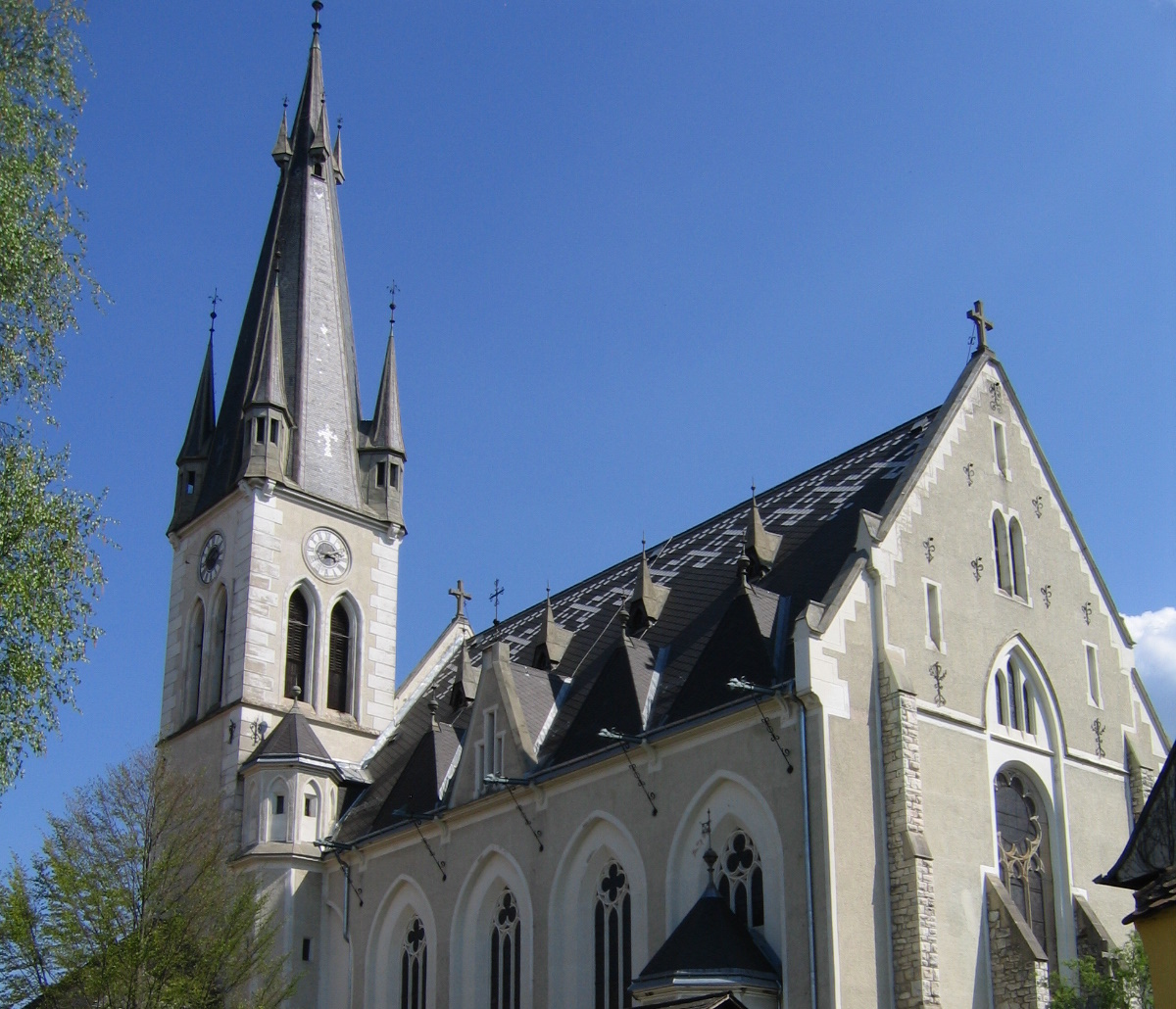
- Weißkirchen parish church

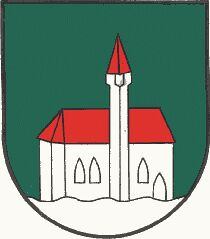
- Coat of arms

- Location within Austria
- Coordinates: 47°09′14″N 14°44′19″E
- Country: Austria
- State: Styria
- District: Murtal

Government
  - Mayor: Markus Tafeit (ÖVP)

Area
  - Total: 149.63 km^{2} (57.77 sq mi)
- Elevation: 689 m (2,260 ft)

Population (2018-01-01)
  - Total: 4,853
  - Density: 32.43/km^{2} (84.00/sq mi)
- Time zone: UTC+1 (CET)
  - Summer (DST): UTC+2 (CEST)
- Postal code: 8741
- Area code: 03577
- Vehicle registration: MT
- Website: www.weisskirchen. steiermark.at

Weißkirchen in Steiermark is a municipality in the district of Murtal in Styria, Austria.
