= Murtal District =

Coordinates: 47°10′21″N 14°39′37″E

Murtal District Bezirk Murtal
- District
- Country: Austria
- State: Styria
- Number of municipalities: 20
- Administrative seat: Judenburg

Government
  - District Governor: Nina Pölzl

Area
  - Total: 1,675.81 km^{2} (647.03 sq mi)

Population (2024)
  - Total: 71,580
  - Density: 42.71/km^{2} (110.6/sq mi)
- Time zone: UTC+01:00 (CET)
  - Summer (DST): UTC+02:00 (CEST)
- Vehicle registration: MT
- NUTS code: AT226

Bezirk Murtal (German: [ˈmuːʁˌtaːl, ˈmuɐ̯ˌtaːl]) is a district of the state of Styria in Austria. It was formed on January 1, 2012, through a merger of the former Judenburg District and Knittelfeld District.

== Municipalities ==
Since the 2015 Styria municipal structural reform, it consists of the following municipalities:

- Fohnsdorf
- Gaal
- Hohentauern
- Judenburg
- Knittelfeld
- Kobenz
- Lobmingtal
- Obdach
- Pöls-Oberkurzheim
- Pölstal
- Pusterwald
- Sankt Georgen ob Judenburg
- Sankt Marein-Feistritz
- St Margarethen
- Sankt Peter ob Judenburg
- Seckau
- Spielberg bei Knittelfeld
- Unzmarkt-Frauenburg
- Weißkirchen in Steiermark
- Zeltweg
