= Oberzeiring =

- Former municipality
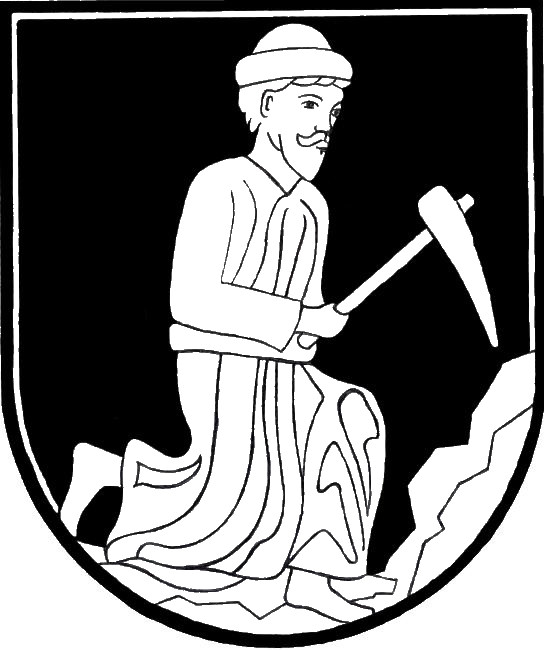
- Coat of arms

- Location within Austria
- Coordinates: 47°15′00″N 14°29′00″E
- Country: Austria
- State: Styria
- District: Murtal

Area
  - Total: 38.23 km^{2} (14.76 sq mi)
- Elevation: 932 m (3,058 ft)

Population (1 January 2016)
  - Total: 834
  - Density: 21.8/km^{2} (56.5/sq mi)
- Time zone: UTC+1 (CET)
  - Summer (DST): UTC+2 (CEST)
- Postal code: 8762
- Area code: 0 35 71
- Vehicle registration: JU
- Website: www.oberzeiring.at

Oberzeiring is a former municipality in the district of Murtal in Styria, Austria. Since the 2015 Styria municipal structural reform, it is part of the municipality Pölstal.

== Tauern Wind Park ==
The Tauern Wind Park near Oberzeiring was the highest wind farm in the world at 1900m elevation when it began operating in 2002. The Wind Park consists of 13 Vestas V66-1.75MW wind turbines, to be repowered by nine V112-3.45 MW turbines. The operator provides guided tours.

== Gallery ==
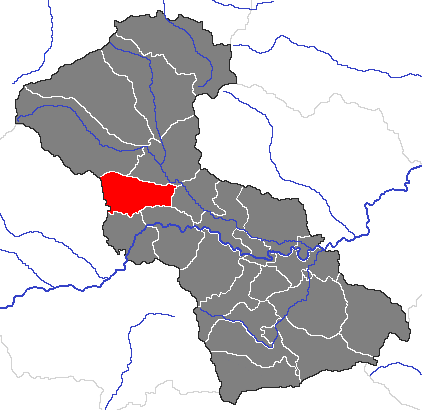
Map showing area of the Municipality Oberzeiring in the District Judenburg in Styria, Austria

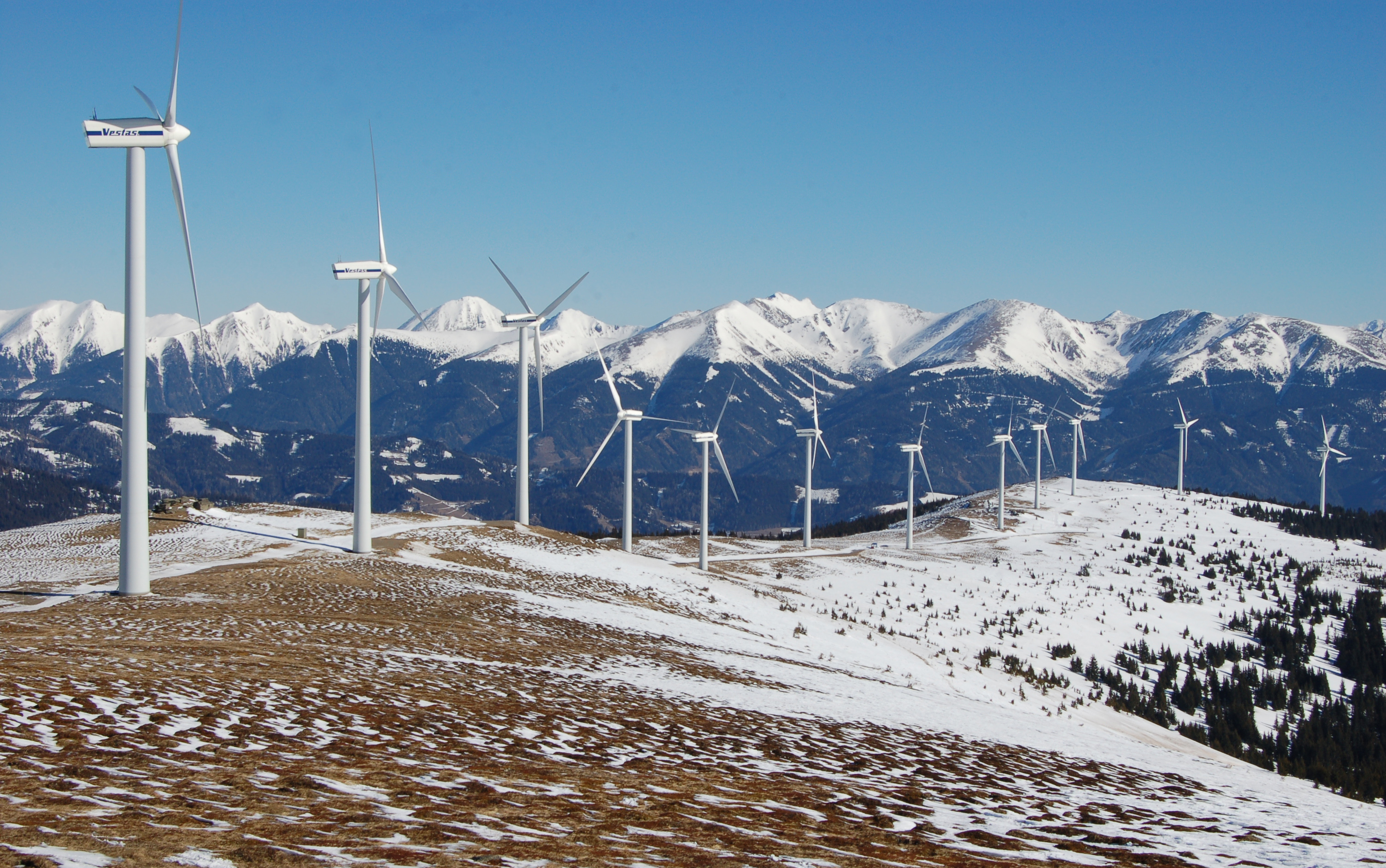
Vestas V66-1.75MW wind turbines of the Tauern Wind Park near Oberzeiring

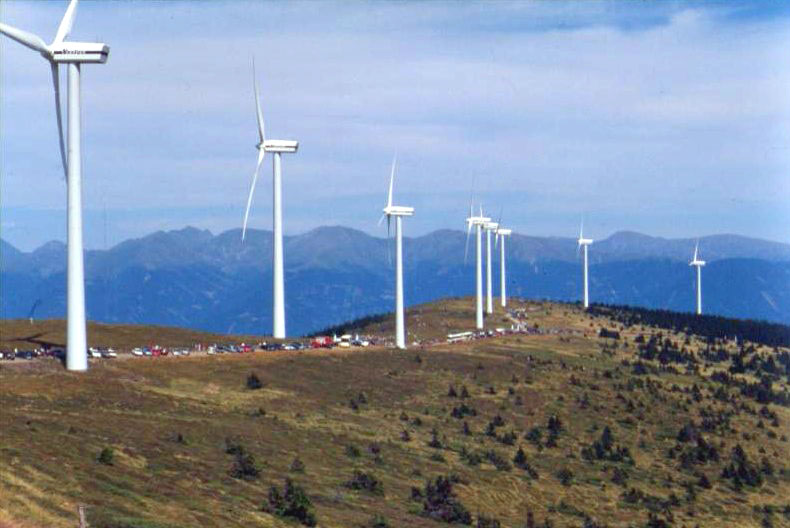
Tauern Wind Park

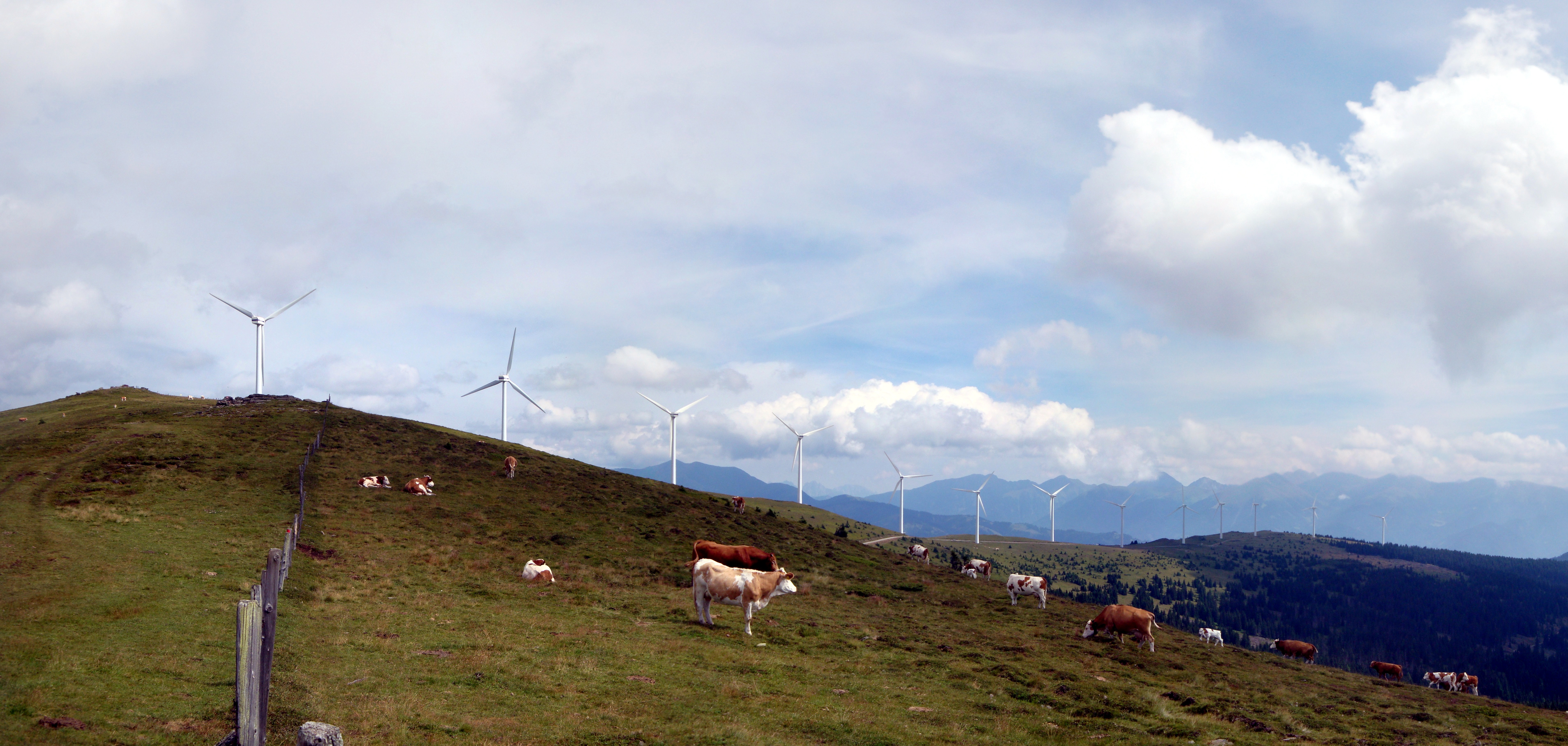
Cattle grazing in front of the Tauern Wind Park

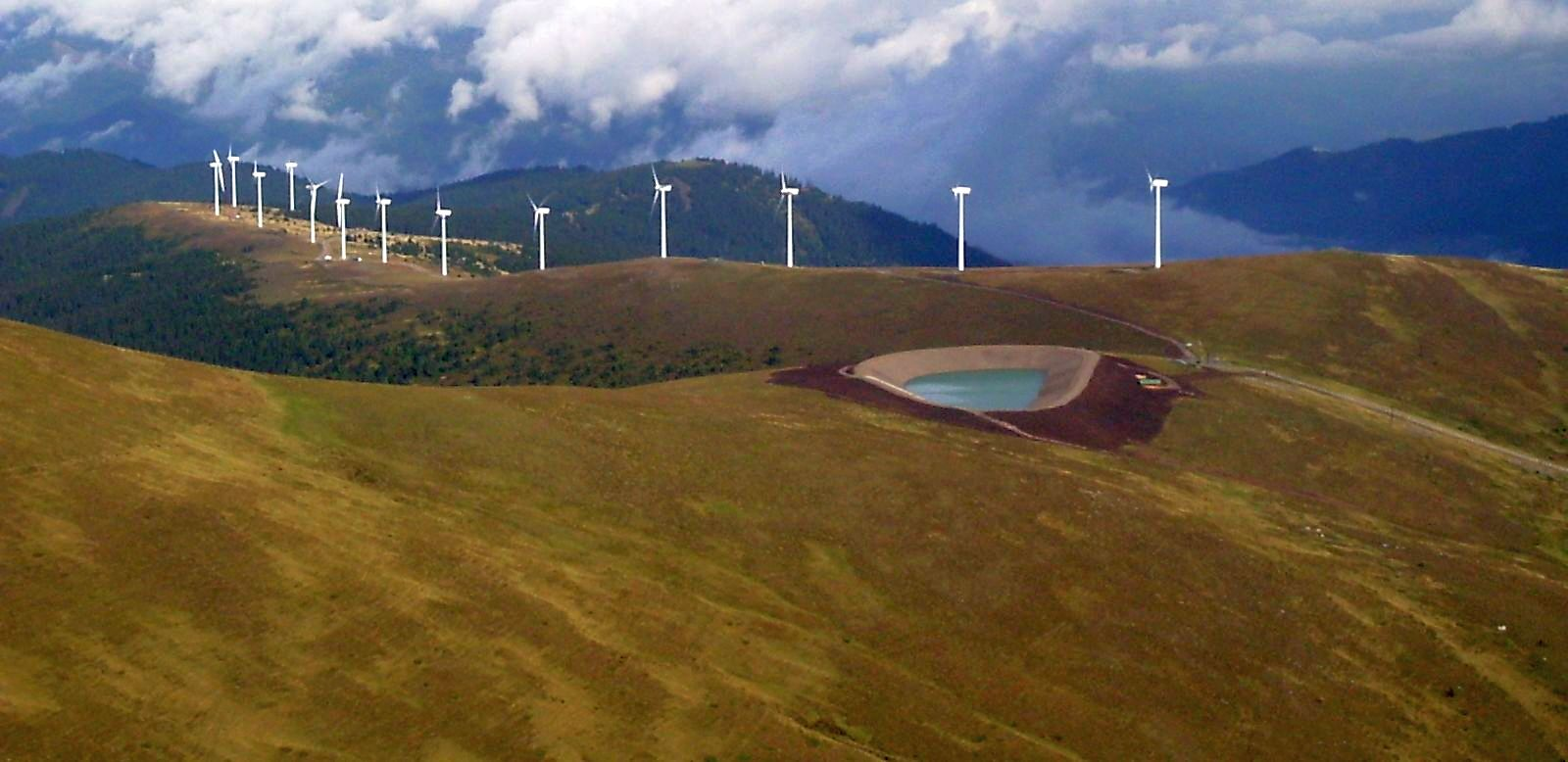
Pond for snow cannons near the Tauern Wind Park
