= Sankt Oswald-Möderbrugg =

- Former municipality
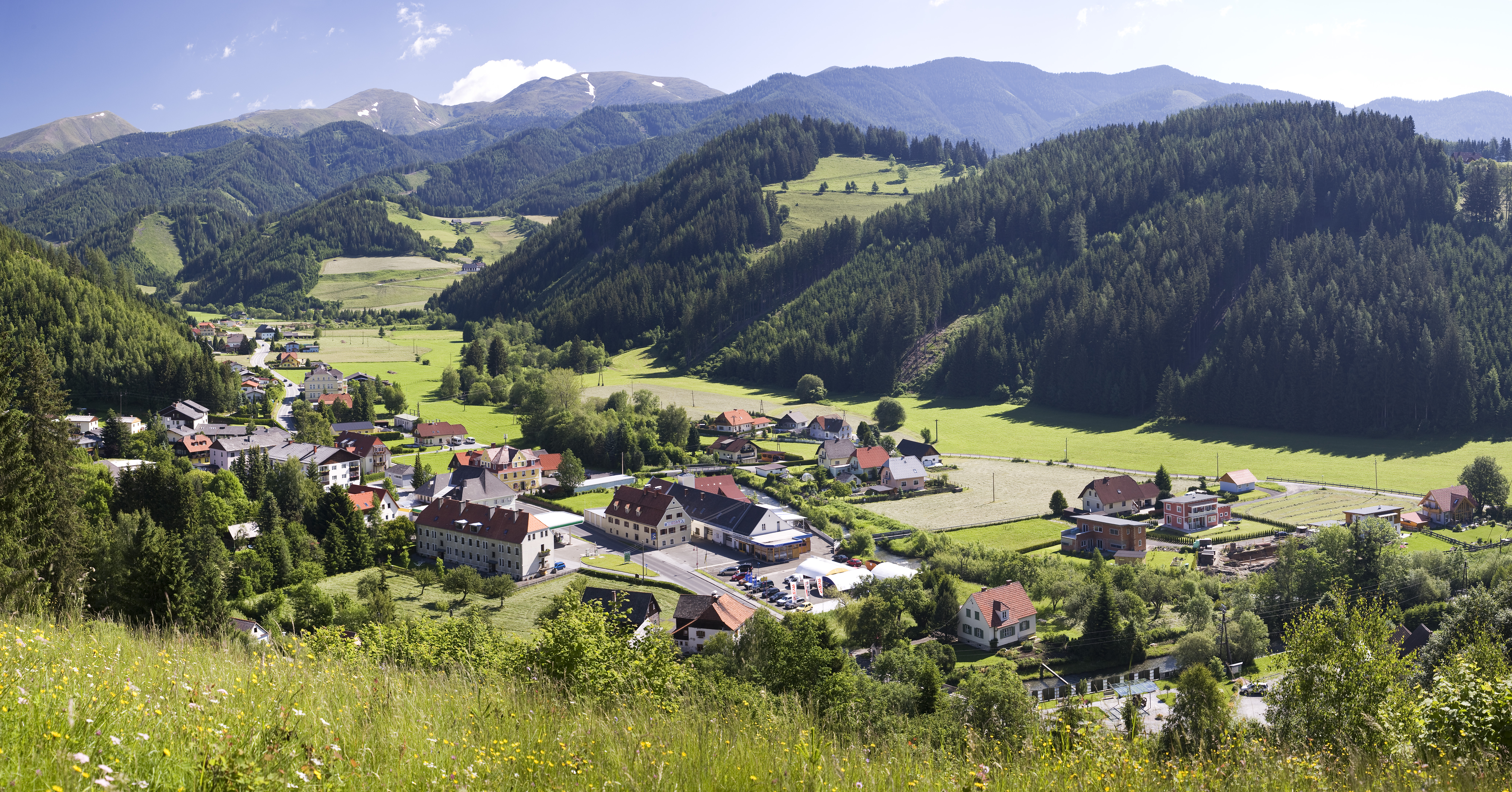
- View of Möderbrugg

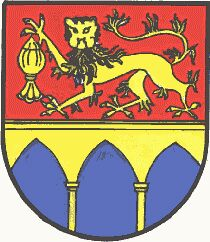
- Coat of arms

- Location within Austria
- Coordinates: 47°17′00″N 14°29′00″E
- Country: Austria
- State: Styria
- District: Murtal

Area
  - Total: 56.26 km^{2} (21.72 sq mi)
- Elevation: 915 m (3,002 ft)

Population (1 January 2016)
  - Total: 1,156
  - Density: 20.55/km^{2} (53.22/sq mi)
- Time zone: UTC+1 (CET)
  - Summer (DST): UTC+2 (CEST)
- Postal code: 8762, 8763
- Area code: +43 3571
- Vehicle registration: JU
- Website: www.stoswald-moederbrugg.at

Sankt Oswald-Möderbrugg is a former municipality in the district of Murtal in Styria, Austria. Since the 2015 Styria municipal structural reform, it is part of the municipality Pölstal.
