= Sankt Johann am Tauern =

- Former municipality
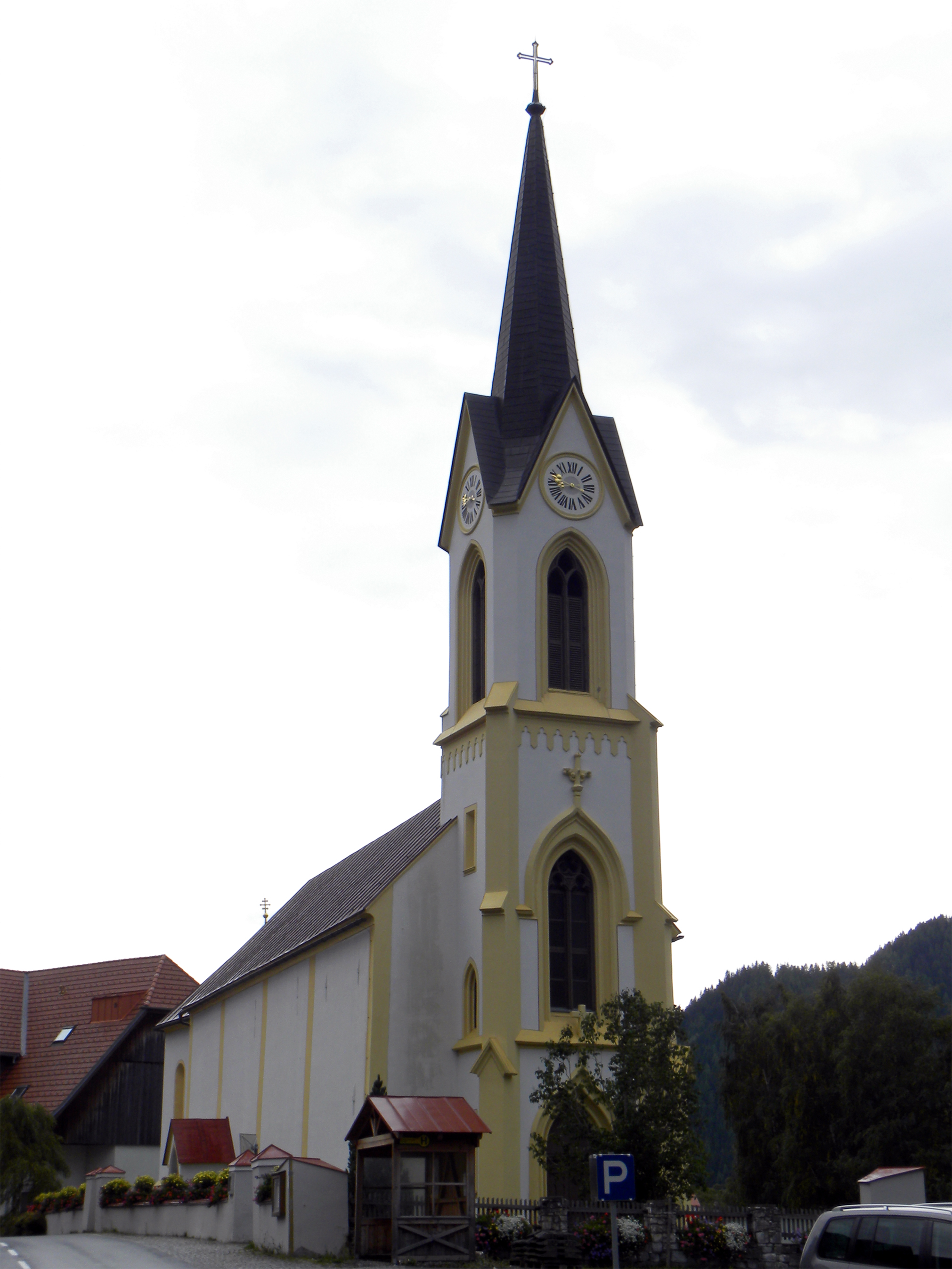
- Sankt Johann am Tauern parish church

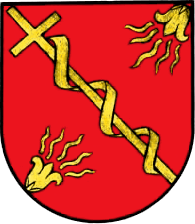
- Coat of arms

- Location within Austria
- Coordinates: 47°21′00″N 14°28′00″E
- Country: Austria
- State: Styria
- District: Murtal

Area
  - Total: 84.77 km^{2} (32.73 sq mi)
- Elevation: 1,056 m (3,465 ft)

Population (1 January 2016)
  - Total: 476
  - Density: 5.62/km^{2} (14.5/sq mi)
- Time zone: UTC+1 (CET)
  - Summer (DST): UTC+2 (CEST)
- Postal code: 8765
- Area code: 03575
- Vehicle registration: JU
- Website: www.st-johann-tauern. steiermark.at

Sankt Johann am Tauern is a former municipality in the district of Murtal in Styria, Austria. Since the 2015 Styria municipal structural reform, it is part of the municipality Pölstal.
