= Bretstein =

- Former municipality
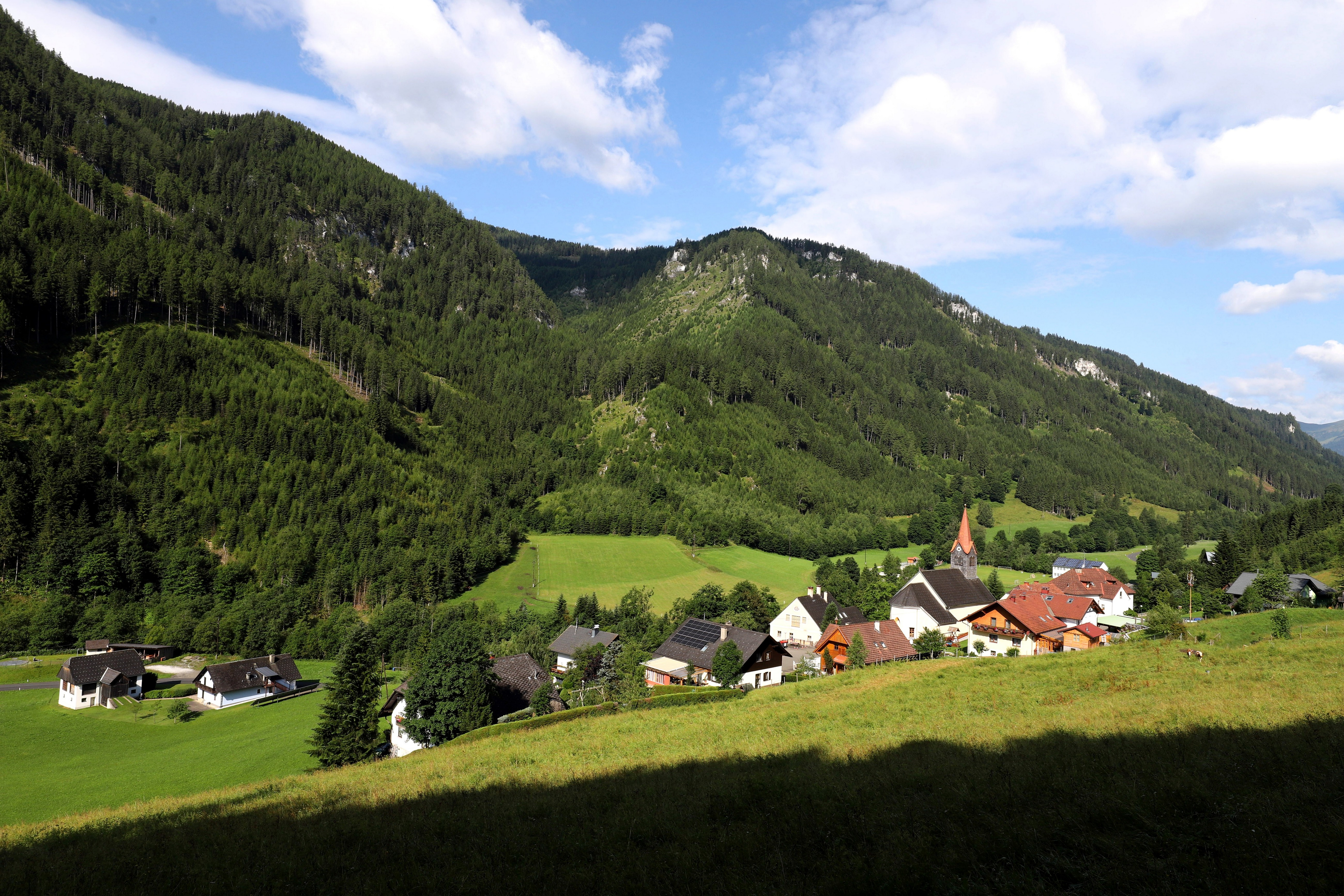

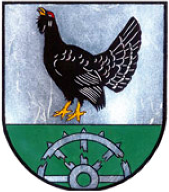
- Coat of arms

- Location within Austria
- Coordinates: 47°20′00″N 14°25′00″E
- Country: Austria
- State: Styria
- District: Murtal

Area
  - Total: 91.31 km^{2} (35.25 sq mi)
- Elevation: 1,036 m (3,399 ft)

Population (1 January 2016)
  - Total: 302
  - Density: 3.31/km^{2} (8.57/sq mi)
- Time zone: UTC+1 (CET)
  - Summer (DST): UTC+2 (CEST)
- Postal code: 8763
- Area code: 0 35 76
- Vehicle registration: JU
- Website: www.bretstein.at

Bretstein is a former municipality in the district of Murtal in the state of Styria in central Austria. Since the 2015 Styria municipal structural reform, it is part of the municipality Pölstal.

== History ==
During World War II, Nazi Germany operated the Bretstein concentration camp, a subcamp of the Mauthausen concentration camp, in Bretstein, whose prisoners were Spanish Republicans and German Jehovah's Witnesses. Five Spaniards were murdered after an unsuccessful escape attempt.

== Geography ==
Bretstein lies in the Niedere Tauern.
