= Pölstal =

- Municipality
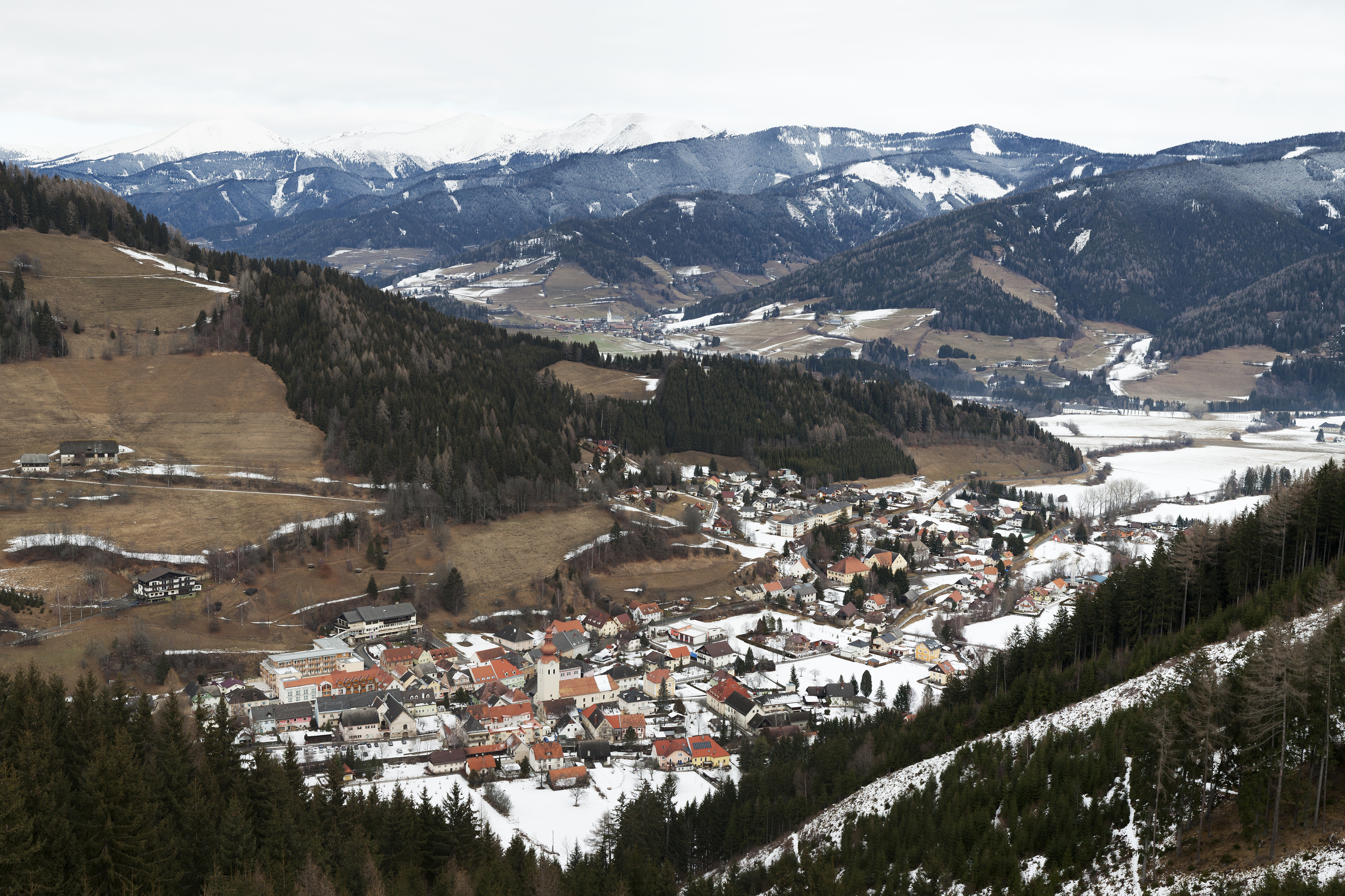
- View of Oberzeiring (part of Pölstal)

- Location within Austria
- Coordinates: 47°17′00″N 14°29′00″E
- Country: Austria
- State: Styria
- District: Murtal

Government
  - Mayor: Alois Mayer (ÖVP)

Area
  - Total: 270.65 km^{2} (104.50 sq mi)
- Elevation: 915 m (3,002 ft)

Population (2018-01-01)
  - Total: 2,670
  - Density: 9.87/km^{2} (25.6/sq mi)
- Time zone: UTC+1 (CET)
  - Summer (DST): UTC+2 (CEST)
- Postal code: 8762, 8763, 8765
- Website: www.poelstal.gv.at

Pölstal is a market town since 2015 in the Murtal District of Styria, Austria.

The municipality, Pölstal, was created as part of the Styria municipal structural reform, at the end of 2014, by merging the former towns Oberzeiring, Bretstein, Sankt Johann am Tauern and Sankt Oswald-Möderbrugg.

== Geography ==
=== Municipality arrangement ===
The municipality territory includes the following nine sections (populations as of January 2015):

- Bretstein (298)
- Gföllgraben (55)
- Möderbrugg (670)
- Oberzeiring (629)
- Sankt Johann am Tauern Schattseite (115)
- Sankt Johann am Tauern Sonnseite (352)
- Sankt Oswald (477)
- Zeiringgraben (43)
- Zugtal (105)

The municipality consists of the seven Katastralgemeinden Bretstein, Möderbrugg, Oberzeiring, St. Johann Schattseite, St. Johann Sonnseite and St. Oswald.

=== Tourism ===
The municipality formed, together with Pusterwald and Pöls-Oberkurzheim, the tourism agency "Region Pölstal". The base is in the town Pölstal.
