= Bretstein concentration camp =

Sub-camp of Mauthausen concentration camp (1941–1942)

Coordinates: 47°21′48″N 14°21′32″E

Bretstein was a subcamp of Mauthausen concentration camp located in Bretstein (near Judenburg, in the upper part of Styria) was associated with the SS-owned operation Deutsche Versuchsanstalt für Ernährung und Verpflegung GmbH, which administrated three working farms in Bretstein since 1939. Concerning this regard it was the basic aim to investigate different methods of operations for agriculture, which should have been used for the purpose of the so-called Germanisierung in Eastern Europe.

During June 1941 the camp was constructed by the first prisoners, who were sent from the concentration camp Mauthausen. The concentration camp in Bretstein was an external camp of the concentration camp in Mauthausen located in Upper Austria, which directed about more than 50 external camps. In Bretstein, at least 170 prisoners were locked up in four barracks, which were surrounded by huge fences and some watchtowers. The prisoners, who were Republic Spaniards, Spanish and German members of Jehovah's Witnesses, have been guarded by up to 50 members of the SS unit Totenkopfsturmbannes Mauthausen, who treated them barbarously. They were forced for road works and functioning in the range of agriculture. As a result of the situation within the camp, many attempts to escape were arranged. The remains of seven former caged inmates can be found at the local cemetery in Bretstein.

The concentration camp in Bretstein was closed on 25 June 1943.
